= Cube Entertainment discography =

South Korean entertainment company discography

Cube Entertainment Inc. is a South Korean entertainment company currently manages several artists, namely Jo Kwon, Pentagon, I-dle, Yoo Seon-ho, and Lightsum. It also manages several entertainers, including Lee Hwi-jae and Heo Kyung-hwan. It was formerly home to K-pop artists such as 4Minute, Beast, G.NA, Roh Ji-hoon, A Train To Autumn, Lai Kuan-lin, Jang Hyun-seung, CLC and BtoB.

As of 2017, most of the label's music is distributed by Kakao M (formerly LOEN Entertainment) through a partnership agreement.

On November 23, 2018, Cube established joint label 'U-CUBE' with Universal Music Japan as part of a global partnership.

In 2019, Cube Entertainment chose NetEase Music as its strategic partner as a platform to promote in China.

== 2000s ==
=== 2005 ===
2005
| Release date | Title | Artist | Format |
|---|---|---|---|
| May 27 | Just My Way | Eddie Shin | Studio Album, Digital download |

=== 2008 ===
2008
| Release date | Title | Artist | Format |
|---|---|---|---|
| June 18 | Good Bye (Cool Mix Ver.) | Mario ft. Crown J | Digital download |
| December 12 | Superman | Mario ft. Lee Chang-min of 2AM | Digital download |

=== 2009 ===
2009
| Release date | Title | Artist | Format |
|---|---|---|---|
| April 2 | First Episode: A New Hero | AJ | Mini Album, Digital download |
| June 15 | Hot Issue | 4Minute | Digital download |
| August 31 | For Muzik | 4Minute | Mini Album, Digital download |
| October 14 | Beast Is the B2ST | BEAST | Mini Album, Digital download |

== 2010s ==
=== 2010 ===
2010
| Release date | Title | Artist | Format | Language |
|---|---|---|---|---|
| January 4 | Change | Hyuna | Digital download | Korean |
| March 1 | Shock of the New Era | BEAST | Mini Album, Digital download | Korean |
| May 5 | For Muzik | 4Minute | CD Single, Digital download | Japanese |
| May 19 | Hit Your Heart | 4Minute | Mini Album, Digital download | Korean |
| July 14 | Draw G's First Breath | G.NA | Mini Album, Digital download | Korean |
| July 28 | I My Me Mine | 4Minute | CD Single, Digital download | Japanese |
| September 30 | Mastermind | BEAST | Mini Album, Digital download | Korean |
| October 21 | Time to Mario | Mario | Studio Album, Digital download | Korean |
| October 21 | First/Dreams Come True | 4Minute | CD Single, Digital download | Japanese |
| November 9 | Lights Go On Again | BEAST | Mini Album, Digital download | Korean |
| December 13 | Young Jee 1st Mini Album | Young Jee | Mini Album, Digital download | Korean |
| December 15 | Diamond | 4Minute | Studio Album, Digital download | Japanese |
| December 21 | My Story | BEAST | Digital download | Korean |

=== 2011 ===
2011
| Release date | Title | Artist | Format | Language |
|---|---|---|---|---|
| January 18 | Black & White | G.NA | Studio Album, Digital download | Korean |
| March 9 | WHY | 4Minute | CD Single, Digital download | Japanese |
| March 16 | Shock | BEAST | CD Single, Digital download | Japanese |
| March 29 | Heart to Heart | 4Minute | Digital download | Korean |
| April 5 | 4Minutes Left | 4Minute | Studio Album, Digital download | Korean |
| May 17 | Fiction and Fact | BEAST | Studio Album, Digital download | Korean |
| June 9 | Sorrowful Heart | Young Jee | Mini Album, Digital download | Korean |
| June 15 | Bad Girl | BEAST | CD Single, Digital download | Japanese |
| July 5 | Bubble Pop! | HyunA | Mini Album, Digital download | Korean |
| August 10 | So Beast | BEAST | Studio Album, Digital download | Japanese |
| August 23 | Top Girl | G.NA | Mini Album, Digital download | Korean |
| September 7 | Heart to Heart | 4Minute | CD Single, Digital download | Japanese |
| November 4 | United Cube | 4Minute, BEAST, G.NA | Studio Album, Digital download | Korean |
| December 1 | Trouble Maker | Trouble Maker | Mini Album, Digital download | Korean |
| December 7 | Ready Go | 4Minute | CD Single, Digital download | Japanese |

=== 2012 ===
2012
| Release date | Title | Artist | Format | Language |
|---|---|---|---|---|
| March 21 | Insane | BtoB | Digital download | Korean |
| April 3 | Born to Beat | BtoB | Mini Album, Digital download | Korean |
| April 9 | Volume Up | 4Minute | Mini Album, Digital download | Korean |
| May 3 | Father | BtoB | Digital download | Korean |
| May 22 | Bloom | G.NA | Mini Album, Digital download | Korean |
| May 23 | Born To Beat (Asia Special Edition) | BtoB | Mini Album, Digital download | Korean |
| July 22 | Midnight Sun | Beast | Mini Album, Digital download | Korean |
| August 22 | Love Tension | 4Minute | CD Single, Digital download | Japanese |
| September 12 | Press Play | BtoB | Mini Album, Digital download | Korean |
| September 21 | Oui | G.NA | Digital download | English |
| September 26 | Best of 4Minute | 4Minute | Compilation Album | Japanese |
| October 17 | Midnight | BEAST | CD Single, Digital download | Japanese |
| October 21 | Melting | HyunA | Mini Album, Digital download | Korean |
| November 7 | The Next Big Thing | Roh Ji Hoon | Mini Album, Digital download | Korean |
| November 26 | The First Collage | Yang Yoseob | Mini Album, Digital download | Korean |

=== 2013 ===
2013
| Release date | Title | Artist | Format | Language |
|---|---|---|---|---|
| January 3 | One Year Ago | Jang Hyun-seung, Jung Eun-ji, Kim Namjoo | Digital Download | Korean |
| January 17 | Harvest Moon | 2YOON | Mini Album, Digital download | Korean |
| March 14 | Beautiful Kisses | G.NA | Mini Album, Digital download | Korean |
| March 14 | Sadness | M4M | Digital download | Mandarin |
| March 15 | The First Collage | Yang Yoseob | Mini Album, Digital download | Japanese |
| March 17 | Mystical Formula | M4M | Mini Album, Digital download | Mandarin |
| April 10 | Second Confession | BtoB | Digital download | Korean |
| April 14 | Fashion City | Jun Guk Gu | Digital download | Korean |
| April 25 | Name Is 4Minute | 4Minute | Mini Album, Digital download | Korean |
| April 30 | Perfume | Yang Yoseob, Oh Seunghee, Jang Seungyeon | Digital download | Korean |
| May 29 | Will You Be Okay? | BEAST | Digital download | Korean |
| June 15 | I'm Sorry | BEAST | Digital download | Korean |
| June 28 | Is It Poppin'? | 4Minute | Digital download | Korean |
| July 19 | Hard to Love, How to Love | BEAST | Studio album, Digital download | Korean |
| September 9 | Thriller | BtoB | Mini Album, Digital download | Korean |
| October 16 | Right There | Shin Ji-hoon | Digital download | Korean |
| October 31 | Chemistry | Trouble Maker | Mini Album, Digital download | Korean |
| November 22 | Hurtful | Shin Ji-hoon | Digital download | Korean |
| December 3 | Christmas Song | Cube United | Digital download | Korean |
| December 13 | Flower | Yong Jun Hyung | Mini Album, Digital download | Korean |

=== 2014 ===
2014
| Release date | Title | Artist | Format | Language |
|---|---|---|---|---|
| January 6 | Rain Effect | Rain | Studio album, Digital download | Korean |
| January 20 | Only Gained Weight | 4Minute | Digital download | Korean |
| February 4 | A Song For You | Roh Ji Hoon | Digital download | Korean |
| February 17 | Beep Beep | BtoB | Mini Album, Digital download | Korean |
| March 17 | 4Minute World | 4Minute | Mini Album, Digital download | Korean |
| March 28 | Adrenaline | BEAST | Single Album | Japanese |
| May 12 | G.Na's Secret | G.NA | Digital download | Korean |
| June 3 | Like That Day | Seo Eun-kwang | Digital download | Korean |
| June 16 | Good Luck | BEAST | Mini Album, Digital Download | Korean |
| June 18 | 고마워:) | 4Minute | Digital download | Korean |
| July 28 | A Talk | HyunA | Mini Album, Digital download | Korean |
| September 2 | Cry Baby | Shin Ji-hoon | Digital download | Korean |
| September 29 | Move | BtoB | Mini Album, Digital Download | Korean |
| October 20 | Time | BEAST | Mini Album, Digital Download | Korean |
| December 3 | You Can Cry | BtoB | Digital Download | Korean |
| December 22 | The Winter's Tale | BtoB | Mini Album, Digital Download | Korean |

=== 2015 ===
2015
| Release date | Title | Artist | Format | Language |
|---|---|---|---|---|
| January 26 | Cold Rain | 4Minute | Digital Download | Korean |
| February 9 | Crazy | 4Minute | Mini Album, Digital Download | Korean |
| March 19 | First Love | CLC | Mini Album, Digital Download | Korean |
| April 16 | Eighteen | CLC | Digital Download | Korean |
| April 20 | Hands Up | BEAST | Single Album | Japanese |
| May 8 | MY | Jang Hyun Seung | Mini Album, Digital Download | Korean |
| May 28 | Question | CLC | Mini Album, Digital Download | Korean |
| June 2 | Photograph | Yook Sungjae, Kim Namjoo | Digital Download | Korean |
| June 29 | Complete | BtoB | Studio Album, Digital download | Korean |
| July 27 | Ordinary | BEAST | Mini Album, Digital download | Korean |
| August 21 | A+ | Hyuna | Mini Album, Digital download | Korean |
| September 16 | Feeling | Roh Ji Hoon | Mini Album, Digital download | Korean |
| October 12 | I Mean | BtoB | Mini Album, Digital download | Korean |

=== 2016 ===
2016
| Release date | Title | Artist | Format | Language |
|---|---|---|---|---|
| February 1 | Act. 7 | 4Minute | Mini Album, Digital Download | Korean |
| February 29 | Refresh | CLC | Mini Album, Digital Download | Korean |
| March 16 | Guess Who? | BEAST | Studio Album, Digital download | Japanese |
| March 28 | Remember That | BtoB | Mini Album, Digital Download | Korean |
| April 13 | High Heels | CLC | Mini Album, Digital Download | Japanese |
| April 16 | Young Love | Yook Sungjae, Joy | Digital Download | Korean |
| April 27 | After This Moment; Don't You Worry | Yong Jun-hyung, DAVII | Digital Download | Korean |
| May 30 | Nu.Clear | CLC | Mini Album, Digital Download | Korean |
| July 4 | Highlight | BEAST | Studio Album, Digital Download | Korean |
| July 9 | Young | Pentagon | Digital Download | Korean |
| July 27 | Chamisma | CLC | Mini Album, Digital download | Japanese |
| August 1 | A'wesome | Hyuna | Mini Album, Digital download | Korean |
| August 6 | I Want To Vacation | BtoB | Digital Download | Korean |
| September 19 | Stand By Me | BtoB Blue | Digital Download | Korean |
| October 10 | Pentagon | Pentagon | Mini Album, Digital Download | Korean |
| November 7 | New Men | BtoB | Mini Album, Digital Download | Korean |
| December 7 | Five Senses | Pentagon | Mini Album, Digital Download | Korean |
| December 16 | Special Christmas | Hyuna, Jang Hyun-seung, BtoB, Roh Ji-hoon, CLC, Pentagon | Digital Download | Korean |
| December 22 | Happy Winter Song | Jinho, Hui | Digital Download | Korean |

=== 2017 ===
2017
| Release date | Title | Artist | Format | Language |
|---|---|---|---|---|
| January 17 | Crystyle | CLC | Mini Album, Digital Download | Korean |
| March 6 | Feel'eM | BtoB | Mini Album, Digital Download | Korean |
| March 29 | Gorilla | Pentagon | Mini Album, Digital Download | Japanese |
| April 24 | At The End | Lee Chang-sub | Digital Download | Korean |
| May 1 | 199X | Triple H | Mini Album, Digital Download | Korean |
| May 18 | "Beautiful" (prod. by Jung Il-hoon) | Pentagon | Digital Download | Korean |
| May 30 | Fancy Shoes | Jung Il-hoon | Digital Download | Korean |
| June 7 | bpm 82.5 | Lee Chang-sub | Mini Album, Digital Download | Japanese |
| June 12 | Ceremony | Pentagon | Mini Album, Digital Download | Korean |
| June 27 | That Girl | Peniel Shin | Digital Download | English |
| July 24 | Swimming | Im Hyunsik | Digital Download | Korean |
| July 27 | Home | Jang Hyun-seung | Digital Download | Korean |
| August 3 | Free'sm | CLC | Mini Album, Digital Download | Korean |
| August 10 | Purple Rain | Lee Min-hyuk | Digital Download | Korean |
| August 29 | Following | HyunA | Mini Album, Digital Download | Korean |
| August 30 | Brand New Days | BtoB | Mini Album, Digital Download | Japanese |
| August 30 | Paradise; Tell Me | Yook Sungjae | Digital Download | Korean |
| September 6 | Demo_01 | Pentagon | Mini Album, Digital Download | Korean |
| September 19 | One Day; Back Then | Seo Eunkwang | Digital Download | Korean |
| October 16 | Brother Act. | BtoB | Studio Album, Digital Download | Korean |
| November 5 | Jelly | Jeon So-yeon | Digital Download | Korean |
| November 22 | Demo_02 | Pentagon | Mini Album, Digital Download | Korean |
| December 4 | Lip & Hip | HyunA | Single Album, Digital Download | Korean |

=== 2018 ===
2018
| Release date | Title | Artist | Format | Language |
|---|---|---|---|---|
| January 5 | OGZ (Prod. by GroovyRoom) | Jo Woo-chan (Jo Woo Chan x Park Hyun Jin x A Chillo) | Digital Download | Korean |
| January 10 | Lonely | Jo Kwon | Single Album, Digital Download | Korean |
| January 17 | Violet | Pentagon | Mini Album, Digital Download | Japanese |
| February 1 | To The Sky | CLC | Digital Download | Korean |
| February 22 | Black Dress | CLC | Mini Album, Digital Download | Korean |
| February 27 | So Do You | Seo Eun-kwang; NC.A(JJ Holic) | Digital Download | Korean |
| February 28 | Idle Song | Jeon So-yeon | Digital Download | Korean |
| February 28 | BTOB Japan Best Album 2014-2017 ～1096 Days～ | BtoB | Compilation album, Digital Download | Japanese |
| March 8 | Big Wave | Jung Il-hoon | Mini Album, Digital Download | Korean |
| April 2 | Positive | Pentagon | Mini Album, Digital Download | Korean |
| April 11 | Spring, Seonho | Yoo Seon-ho | Mini Album, Digital Download | Korean |
| May 2 | I Am | (G)I-DLE | Mini Album, Digital Download | Korean |
| June 11 | The Feeling | BtoB | Digital Download | Korean |
| June 17 | 한걸음 (Follow Your Dreams) | United Cube | Digital Download | Korean |
| June 17 | Upgrade | United Cube | Digital Download | Korean |
| June 17 | Young & One | United Cube | Digital Download | Korean |
| June 17 | Mermaid | Lee Min-hyuk, Peniel Shin, Jung Il-hoon Jang Yeeun, Wooseok, Jeon So-yeon | Digital Download | Korean |
| June 18 | This Is Us | BtoB | Mini Album, Digital Download | Korean |
| July 10 | Summer Diary | Lee Min-hyuk | Mini Album, Digital Download | Japanese |
| July 15 | A Watercolor of a Rainy Day | A Train To Autumn | Digital Download | Korean |
| July 18 | REtro Futurism | Triple H | Mini Album, Digital Download | Korean |
| August 2 | When The Rain Falls | BTOB Blue | Digital Download | Korean |
| August 14 | Hann (Alone) (한(一)) | (G)I-DLE | Digital Download | Korean |
| August 29 | Shine | Pentagon | Mini Album, Digital Download | Japanese |
| September 10 | Thumbs Up! | Pentagon | Mini Album, Digital Download | Korean |
| September 28 | Wow Thing (와우 맡은 일) | Jeon So-Yeon (Seulgi x SinB x Kim Chung-ha) | Digital Download | Korean |
| October 23 | Friends | BtoB | Digital Download | Korean |
| November 3 | Pop/Stars | Soyeon, Miyeon with Jaira Burns, Madison Beer as K/DA | Digital Download | English, Korean |
| November 5 | That Season You Were In | A Train to Autumn | Digital Download | Korean |
| November 12 | Hour Moment | BtoB | Special Mini Album, Digital Download | Korean |
| November 23 | "I Dream" | Elkie Chong | Digital Download | Korean |
| December 11 | Mark | Lee Chang-sub | Mini Album, Digital Download | Korean |

=== 2019 ===
2019
| Release date | Title | Artist | Type | Format | Language | Ref. |
|---|---|---|---|---|---|---|
| January 15 | Hutazone | Lee Min-hyuk | Studio album | CD, Digital download | Korean | |
| January 30 | No.1 | CLC | Extended play | CD, Digital download | Korean | |
| February 13 | Cosmo | Pentagon | Single album | CD, Digital download | Japanese | |
| February 21 | "Spoiler" | Jung Il-hoon ft Babylon | Digital single | Digital download | Korean | |
| February 25 | "Farewell Again" | A Train To Autumn | Digital single | Digital download | Korean | |
| February 26 | I Made | (G)I-dle | Extended play | CD, Digital download | Korean | |
| March 7 | Piece of BtoB | BtoB | Compilation album | CD, Digital download | Korean | |
| March 11 | 9801 | Wooseok x Kuanlin | Extended play | CD, Digital download | Korean | |
| March 27 | Genie:us | Pentagon | Extended play | CD, Digital download | Korean | |
| April 5 | "Sorry" | Seo Eunkwang, Lee Minhyuk, Lee Changsub | Special digital single | Digital download | Korean | |
| April 29 | "Spring Rain" | A Train To Autumn | Digital single | Digital download | Korean | |
| May 13 | "B.O.D" | Peniel Shin | Digital single | Digital download | English | |
| May 29 | "Me" | CLC | Digital single | Digital download | Korean | |
| June 26 | "Uh-Oh" | (G)I-dle | Digital single | Digital download | Korean | |
| June 28 | Latata (Japanese ver.) (Note: Pre-released song through iTunes and Spotify before LATATA (EP) release on July 31.) | (G)I-dle | Digital single | Digital download | Japanese | |
| July 17 | Sum(me:r) | Pentagon | Extended play | CD, Digital download | Korean | |
| July 31 | Latata | (G)I-dle | Extended play | CD, Digital download | Japanese | |
| July 31 | "Fly23" | Peniel Shin | Digital single | Digital download | English | |
| August 21 | Happiness / Sha La La | Pentagon | Single album | CD, Digital download | Japanese | |
| August 27 | "Flip" | Peniel Shin ft Beenzino | Digital single | Digital download | English, Korean | |
| September 6 | "Devil" | CLC | Digital single | Digital download | Korean | |
| October 14 | Rendez-vous | Im Hyunsik | Extended play | CD, Digital download | Korean | |
| December 26 | 3X2=6 Part 1 | Yook Sung-jae | Digital single | Digital download | Korean | |

== 2020s ==
=== 2020 ===
2020
| Release date | Title | Artist | Type | Format | Language | Ref. |
|---|---|---|---|---|---|---|
| January 16 | 3X2=6 Part 2 | Yook Sung-jae | Digital single | Digital download | Korean | |
| January 31 | Rendez-vous (Live) | Im Hyun-sik | Live album | CD, Digital download | Korean | |
| February 6 | 3X2=6 Part 3 | Yook Sung-jae | Digital single | Digital download | Korean | |
| February 12 | Universe: The Black Hall | Pentagon | Studio album | CD, Digital download | Korean | |
| March 2 | Yook O'Clock | Yook Sung-jae | Special album | CD, Digital download | Korean | |
| April 6 | I Trust | (G)I-dle | Extended play | CD, Digital download | Korean | |
| May 15 | "Latata" | (G)I-dle | Digital single | Digital download | English | |
| May 21 | "Dear My Dear" (Hangul: 서랍; lit. Drawer) | Seo Eun-kwang | Digital single | Digital download | Korean | |
| June 8 | FoRest: Entrance | Seo Eun-kwang | Extended play | CD, Digital download | Korean | |
| July 7 | "I'm the Trend" | (G)I-dle | Digital single | Digital download | Korean | |
| July 21 | "Remain (남아있어)" | Im Hyun-sik | Digital single | Digital download | Korean | |
| August 3 | Dumdi Dumdi | (G)I-dle | Single album | CD, Digital download | Korean, Chinese | |
| August 26 | Oh My God | (G)I-dle | Extended play | CD, Digital download | Japanese | |
| September 2 | Helicopter | CLC | Single album | CD, Digital download | Korean, English | |
| September 23 | Universe: The History | Pentagon | Studio album | CD, Digital download | Japanese | |
| October 12 | We:th | Pentagon | Extended play | CD, Digital download | Korean | |
| October 28 | "Daisy" | Pentagon | Digital single | Digital download | Japanese, Chinese | |
| November 16 | Inside | BtoB 4U | Extended play | CD, Digital download | Korean | |
| December 2 | "Show Your Love" | BtoB 4U | Digital single | Digital download | Japanese | |
| December 17 | "I Just Can't Stop Loving You" | Jang Hyun-seung | Digital single | Digital download | Korean | |
| December 18 | "Eternal Flame" | Pentagon | Digital single | Digital download | Korean | |

=== 2021 ===
2021
| Release date | Title | Artist | Type | Format | Language | Ref. |
|---|---|---|---|---|---|---|
| January 11 | I Burn | (G)I-dle | Extended play | CD, Digital download | Korean | |
| January 27 | "Hwaa" | (G)I-dle | Digital single | Digital download | English, Chinese | |
| February 5 | "Hwaa (Dimitri Vegas & Like Mike remix)" | (G)I-dle | Digital single | Digital download | Korean, English | |
| February 14 | "Valentine" | Peniel Shin | Digital single | Digital download | Korean | |
| March 15 | Love or Take | Pentagon | Extended play | CD, Digital download | Korean | |
| March 23 | "Run" | Sorn | Digital single | Digital download | Korean | |
| April 9 | "Do or Not" | Pentagon | Digital single | Digital download | English, Chinese | |
| May 13 | A Page | Song Yuqi | Digital single | Digital download | English, Chinese | |
| June 10 | Vanilla | Lightsum | Single album | CD, Digital download | Korean | |
| June 13 | "Blue Moon (Cinema Ver.)" | BtoB | Digital single | Digital download | Korean | |
| June 14 | Do or Not | Pentagon | Extended play | Digital download | Japanese | |
| June 23 | Do or Not | Pentagon | Extended play | CD | Japanese | |
| July 5 | Windy | Jeon So-yeon | Extended play | CD, Digital download | Korean | |
| August 18 | "Cerberus" | Yuto, Kino, Wooseok | Digital single | Digital download | Korean | |
| August 30 | 4U: Outside | BtoB | Special album | CD, Digital download | Korean | |
| October 13 | Light a Wish | Lightsum | Single album | CD, Digital download | Korean | |
| October 13 | Outsider | BtoB | Digital single | Digital download | Japanese | |
| October 27 | Outsider | BtoB | Extended play | CD, Digital download | Japanese | |
| November 5 | "Good Night" | Lee Min-hyuk | Digital single | Digital download | Korean | |

=== 2022 ===
2022
| Release date | Title | Artist | Type | Format | Language | Ref. |
|---|---|---|---|---|---|---|
| January 24 | In:vite U | Pentagon | Extended play | CD, Digital download | Korean | |
| February 21 | Be Together | BtoB | Studio album | CD, Digital download | Korean | |
| March 14 | I Never Die | (G)I-dle | Studio album | CD, Digital download | Korean | |
| April 27 | My | Cho Mi-yeon | Extended play | CD, Digital download | Korean | |
| May 24 | Into the Light | Lightsum | Extended play | CD, Digital download | Korean | |
| June 27 | Boom | Lee Min-hyuk | Studio album | CD, Digital download | Korean | |
| August 9 | "Pose" | Kino | Digital single | Download | Korean | |
| September 6 | "Surrender" | Changsub | Digital single | Download | Korean | |
| September 14 | Feelin' Like | Pentagon | Extended play | CD, Digital download | Japanese | |
| October 17 | I Love | (G)I-dle | Extended play | CD, Digital download | Korean | |

=== 2023 ===
2023
| Release date | Title | Artist | Type | Format | Language | Ref. |
|---|---|---|---|---|---|---|
| May 2 | Wind and Wish | BtoB | Extended Play | CD, Digital download | Korean | |
| May 10 | “Shh” | Pentagon | Digital Single | Download | Japanese | |
| May 15 | I Feel | (G)I-dle | Extended Play | CD, Digital download | Korean | |
| July 14 | "I Do" | (G)I-dle | Digital Single | Download | English | |
| August 30 | Pado | Pentagon | Extended play | CD, Digital download | Japanese | |
| October 6 | Heat | (G)I-dle | Extended play | CD, Digital download | English | |
| October 10 | "With Universe" | Pentagon | Digital Single | Download | Korean | |
| October 11 | Honey or Spice | Lightsum | Extended Play | CD, Digital download | Korean | |

=== 2024 ===
2024
| Release date | Title | Artist | Type | Format | Language | Ref. |
|---|---|---|---|---|---|---|
| January 16 | Whu Is Me: Complex | Hui | Extended Play | CD, Digital download | Korean | |
| April 24 | NOWADAYS | NOWADAYS | Digital Single | | Korean | |
| August 7 | POSE! | LIGHTSUM | Digital Single | | Korean | |

== See also ==
- Cube Entertainment Projects
- BtoB discography
  - List of songs recorded by BtoB
- CLC discography
  - List of songs recorded by CLC
- Pentagon discography
  - List of songs recorded by Pentagon
- (G)I-dle discography
  - List of songs recorded by (G)I-dle
- 4Minute discography
  - List of songs recorded by 4Minute
  - Hyuna discography
- Highlight discography
