= 4Minute discography =

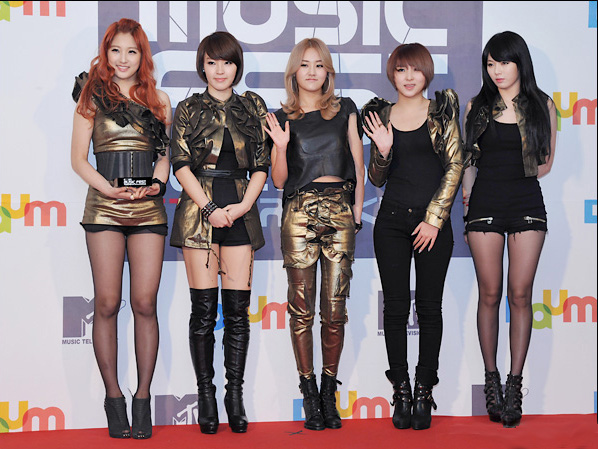
- 4Minute in 2011; From left to right: Jihyun, Jiyoon, Gayoon, Sohyun and Hyuna
- Studio albums: 2
- Extended plays: 7
- Soundtrack albums: 6
- Compilation albums: 1
- Singles: 20
- Video albums: 2
- Music videos: 28

South Korea-based girl group 4Minute have released two studio albums, one compilation album, seven extended plays (EPs), twenty singles and six soundtrack contributions. The group made their debuted with the song "Hot Issue" on June 15, 2009.

== Albums ==
=== Studio albums ===
List of studio albums, with selected details and chart positions
Title	Album details	Peak chart positions		Sales
Title	Album details	KOR	JPN	Sales
4Minutes Left	Released: April 5, 2011 (KOR); Label: Cube Entertainment, Universal; Format: CD, digital download, streaming	2	145	KOR: 38,678; JPN: 2,344
Diamond	Released: December 15, 2010 (JPN); Label: Far Eastern Tribe Records; Format: CD, digital download, streaming	10	27	JPN: 12,273

=== Compilation albums ===
List of compilation albums, with selected details, chart positions, sales, and certifications
Title	Album details	Peak chart positions		Sales
Title	Album details	KOR	JPN	Sales
Best of 4Minute	Released: September 26, 2012 (JPN); Label: Far Eastern Tribe Records; Format: CD, digital download, streaming	—	37	JPN: 6,110
"—" denotes releases that did not chart or were not released in that region.

== Extended plays ==
List of extended plays, with selected chart positions and sales
Title	Details	Peak chart positions			Sales
Title	Details	KOR	JPN	US World	Sales
For Muzik	Released: August 28, 2009 (KOR); Label: Cube Entertainment, Mnet Media; Formats: CD, digital download, streaming	2	—	—	—N/a
Hit Your Heart	Released: May 19, 2010 (KOR); Label: Cube Entertainment, Universal; Formats: CD, digital download, streaming	3	205	—	KOR: 28,064
Volume Up	Released: April 9, 2012 (KOR); Label: Cube Entertainment, Universal; Formats: CD, digital download, streaming	1	114	—	KOR: 57,786; JPN: 1,744
Name Is 4Minute	Released: April 26, 2013 (KOR); Label: Cube Entertainment, Universal; Formats: CD, digital download, streaming	2	83	13	KOR: 15,620; JPN: 1,998
4Minute World	Released: March 17, 2014 (KOR); Label: Cube Entertainment, Universal; Formats: CD, digital download, streaming	2	—	13	KOR: 11,779; JPN: 922
Crazy	Released: February 9, 2015 (KOR); Label: Cube Entertainment, Universal; Formats: CD, digital download, streaming	2	—	1	KOR: 22,102; JPN: 783; US: 1,000
Act. 7	Released: February 1, 2016 (KOR); Label: Cube Entertainment, Universal; Formats: CD, digital download, streaming	2	274	3	KOR: 12,810; JPN: 257
"—" denotes releases that did not chart or were not released in that region.

== Singles ==
List of singles, with selected chart positions, showing year released and album name
Title	Year	Peak chart positions					Sales (Note: Sales figures for tracks are based on digital downloads, except noted.)	Album
Title	Year	KOR	KOR Hot (Note: The Billboard K-pop Hot 100 chart launched in 2011 and was discontinued in July 16, 2014. On the issue dated May 29 – June 4, 2017, the chart was re-established.)	JPN	JPN Hot	US World	Sales	Album
Korean
"Hot Issue"	2009	—	—	—	—	—		For Muzik
"Muzik"	2009	—	—	—	—	—		For Muzik
"What a Girl Wants"	2009	—	—	—	—	—		For Muzik
"Jingle Jingle"	2009	—	—	—	—	—		Non-album single
"HuH"	2010	3	—	—	—	—	KOR: 2,357,440	Hit Your Heart
"I My Me Mine"	2010	9	—	—	—	—	KOR: 1,815,744	Hit Your Heart
"Superstar"	2010	22	—	—	—	—		Non-album single
"Heart to Heart"	2011	5	—	—	—	—	KOR: 1,842,291	4Minutes Left
"Mirror Mirror" (거울아 거울아)	2011	2	—	—	—	—	KOR: 2,057,010	4Minutes Left
"Freestyle"	2011	28	—	—	—	—	KOR: 409,527	Non-album single
"Volume Up"	2012	2	3	—	—	9	KOR: 1,816,296	Volume Up
"Over and Over (R.Tee Mix)"	2012	20	—	—	—	—	KOR: 419,967	Non-album single
"What's Your Name?" (이름이 뭐예요?)	2013	1	1	—	—	9	KOR: 1,477,832	Name Is 4Minute
"Is It Poppin'?" (물좋아?)	2013	9	6	—	—	18	KOR: 596,404	Non-album singles
"Gain Weight" (살만찌고) (feat. Brave Brothers)	2014	5	10	—	—	—	KOR: 296,826	Non-album singles
"Whatcha Doin' Today" (오늘 뭐해)	2014	1	4	—	—	12	KOR: 624,845	4Minute World
"Thank You :)" (고마워 :))	2014	—	—	—	—	—	KOR: 17,113	4Minute World
"Cold Rain" (추운 비)	2015	15	—	—	—	—	KOR: 432,381	Crazy
"Crazy" (미쳐)	2015	3	—	—	—	2	KOR: 664,249; US: 2,000	Crazy
"Hate" (싫어)	2016	13	—	—	—	2	KOR: 262,470	Act. 7
Japanese
"Muzik"	2010	—	—	21	—	—	JPN: 6,154 (phy.)	Diamond
"I My Me Mine"	2010	—	—	26	—	—	JPN: 10,945 (phy.)	Diamond
"First/Dreams Come True"	2010	—	—	28	—	—	JPN: 6,097 (phy.)	Diamond
"Why"	2011	—	—	17	40	—	JPN: 13,559 (phy.)	Best of 4Minute
"Heart to Heart"	2011	—	—	18	42	—	JPN: 9,930 (phy.)	Best of 4Minute
"Ready Go"	2011	—	70	23	—	—	JPN: 8,253 (phy.)	Best of 4Minute
"Love Tension"	2012	—	—	26	—	—	JPN: 4,820 (phy.)	Best of 4Minute
"—" denotes releases that did not chart or were not released in that region.

== Other appearances ==
Year	Title	Other artist(s)	Album
2010	"Heard 'Em All (Remix)"	Amerie, Jun Hyung	In Love & War (Asia Edition)
2010	"Once Again, Republic of Korea (다시 한 번 대한민국)" also known as World Cup Song	Brown Eyed Girls	Non-album singles
2011	"Without U"	Thelma Aoyama	Non-album singles
2011	"Fly So High"	Cube Artist	Non-album singles
2011	"Silly Boy"	015B, Jun Hyung	Non-album singles
2013	"Christmas Song"	Cube Artist	Non-album singles
2013	"You Are A Miracle"	SBS Gayo Daejeon Friendship Project	Non-album singles

== Soundtracks ==
Year	Title	Television series
2010	"Dreams Come True"	Master of Study
2010	"Making Love (사랑 만들기)"	Personal Taste
2010	"Chaos A.D."	The Fugitive: Plan B
2010	"Home Run (홈런)"	Rolling Stars
2010	"One Thing"	It's Okay, Daddy's Daughter
2011	"Why"	Akuto: Juhanzai Sosahan
2012	"Welcome to the School"	School 2013

== Video albums ==
=== DVDs ===
Title	Album details	Peak chart positions	Sales
Title	Album details	JPN	Sales
Emerald Of 4Minute	Released: September 7, 2011; Format: DVD	16	JPN: 2,812
Volume Up On/Off	Released: September 19, 2012; Format: DVD	176	—N/a

== Videography ==
=== As group artist ===
Title	Year	Directors(s)	Other version(s)
Korean
"Hot Issue"	2009	Hong Won-ki	N/A
"Muzik"	2009	Hong Won-ki	N/A
"What a Girl Wants"	2009	Hong Won-ki	N/A
"Jingle Jingle"	2009	Unknown	N/A
"Huh"	2010	Hong Won-ki	N/A
"I My Me Mine"	2010	Hong Won-ki	N/A
"Superstar"	2010	Unknown	N/A
"Heart to Heart"	2011	Hon Won-ki	N/A
"Mirror Mirror"	2011	Hon Won-ki	N/A
"Freestyle"	2011	Unknown	N/A
"Volume Up"	2012	Hong Won-ki	N/A
"Over and Over"	2012	Unknown	N/A
"What's Your Name?"	2013	Hong Won-ki	N/A
"Is It Poppin'?"	2013	Hong Won-ki	N/A
"Whatcha Doin' Today?"	2014	Hong Won-ki	N/A
"Thank You :)"	2014	Unknown	N/A
"Cold Rain"	2015	Hong Won-ki	N/A
"Crazy"	2015	Hong Won-ki	Choreography Version
"Hate"	2016	Hong Won-ki	N/A
"Canvas"	2016	Unknown	360° VR Camera
Japanese
"Muzik"	2010	Unknown	N/A
"I My Me Mine"	2010	Unknown	N/A
"First"	2010	Unknown	N/A
"Why"	2011	Hong Won-ki	N/A
"Heart to Heart"	2011	Unknown	N/A
"Ready Go"	2011	Unknown	Dance Version
"Love Tension"	2012	Unknown	N/A

=== As sub-unit 2YOON ===
Title	Year	Directors	Other version(s)
"24/7"	2013	Hong Won-ki	N/A
