= List of songs recorded by 4Minute =

Here is a complete list of songs by the Korean girl group 4Minute.

== 0–9 ==
Song	Writer	Album	Year
"4Minutes Left"	Shinsadong Tiger, Im Sang-hyuk, Choi Kyu-sung	4minutes Left	2011
"24/7"	Lee Sangho, Seo Jaewoo, Seo Yongbae	Harvest Moon	2013

== A ==
Song	Writer	Album	Year
"Already Gone"	Im Sang-hyuk, Da9297	Diamond	2010

== B ==
Song	Writer	Album	Year
"Bababa"	Kang Ji-won, Kim Kibum	Hit Your Heart	2010
"Badly"	Im Sang-hyuk, Lee Joo-hyung, Heo Ga-yoon, Jeon Ji-yoon	4minutes Left	2011
"Black Cat"	Chang Jun Ho, Min Yeon Jae, Gong Hyun Sik	Volume Up	2012
"Black Swan"	Yoon Hyejoo, Nassun, Lars Aass, Ole Henrik Antonsen, Claudia Mills	Harvest Moon	2013

== C ==
Song	Writer	Album	Year
"Cool and Natural"	Kim Kibum, Kang Ji-won	Hit Your Heart	2010
"Can't Make Up My Mind"	HOOKs, Jeff Miyahara, Hiromi	Diamond	2010

== D ==
Song	Writer	Album	Year
"Dreams Come True"	Kim Dong-hyon, Kanata Okajima	Best of 4Minute	2010
"December"	Nao	Diamond	2010
"Dream Racer"	The Koxx	Volume Up	2012
"Domino"	Min Yeonhae, Faces of Glory	Name Is 4Minute	2013

== F ==
Song	Writer	Album	Year
"For Muzik"	Jeon Ji Yoon, Lee Sang-ho	For Muzik	2009
"Funny"	Kim Do-hoon, Kim Jin-hwan, Choi Gab-won	For Muzik	2009
"First"	Shinsadong Tiger, Kanata Okajima	Best of 4Minute	2010
"Femme Fatale"	M (Lee Min Woo), David Kim (Day Day), Kim Do Hyun	Volume Up	2012

== G ==
Song	Writer	Album	Year
"Get On The Floor"	Kim Dong Yeol, Im Sang Hyuk	Volume Up	2012
"Goodbye"	Hidehiko Morino, Takashi Fukuda	Best of 4Minute	2012
"Gimme That"	Im Sanghyuk, Kim Taeho, Son Youngjin, Slrppy	Name Is 4Minute	2013

== H ==
Song	Writer	Album	Year
"Hate"		Act. 7	2016
"Hot Issue"	Shinsadong Tiger, Jeon Hye-won	For Muzik	2009
"Huh"	Shinsadong Tiger, Yong Jun Hyung	Hit Your Heart	2010
"Highlight"	Kang Ji-won, Kim Kibum	Hit Your Heart	2010
'"Hide & Seek"	Shinsadong Tiger, Choi Kyu-sung	Diamond	2010
"Heart to Heart"	Shinsadong Tiger, Choi Kyu-sung	4minutes Left	2011

== I ==
Song	Writer	Album	Year
"I My Me Mine"	Lee Sang-ho, Shinsadong Tiger	Hit Your Heart	2010
"Invitation"	Im Sang-hyuk, Shinsadong Tiger	Hit Your Heart	2010
"I'm Ok"	Rado	Volume Up	2012
"Is It Poppin'?"	Brave Brothers	TBA	2013

== L ==
Song	Writer	Album	Year
"Love Tension"	Kim Do-hoon, Lee Sang-ho, Rina Moon	Best of 4Minute	2012

== M ==
Song	Writer	Album	Year
"Muzik"	Lee Sangho, Shinsadong Tiger	For Muzik	2009
"Mirror Mirror"	Shinsadong Tiger, blue Magic	4minutes Left	2011

== N ==
Song	Writer	Album	Year
"Nightmare"	Lee Sangho, Mario, Seo Jaewoo, Seo Yongbae	Harvest Moon	2013

== P ==
Song	Writer	Album	Year
"Pretend"	Choi Kyu-sung	4minutes Left	2011

== R ==
Song	Writer	Album	Year
"Ready Go"	Jang Jun-Ho, Gong Hyun-Sik, Leemssang, Seo Jae-Woo, Kim Taeho	Best of 4Minute	2011

== S ==
Song	Writer	Album	Year
"Superstar"			2010
"Sweet Suga Honey!"	Jang Jun-ho, Gong Hyun-sik, Sugar Flow	4minutes Left	2011
"Say My Name"	Seo Yong Bae, Seo Jae Woo	Volume Up	2012
"Ssessesse"	Lim Sanghyuk, Ji Yoon, Park SooSeok, Kikaflo	Harvest Moon	2013

== V ==
Song	Writer	Album	Year
"Volume Up"	Shinsadong Tiger, Rado	Volume Up	2012

== W ==
Song	Writer	Album	Year
"What a Girl Wants"	Hwang Sung-jin, Lee Sang-ho, Shinsadong Tiger	For Muzik	2009
"Won't Give You"	Shinsadong Tiger, Choi Kyu-sung	For Muzik	2009
"Who's Next?"	Shinsadong Tiger	Hit Your Heart	2010
"Why"	Rhymer, MasterKey, Kanata Okajima	Best of 4Minute	2011
"Why Not"	Remee Sigvardt, Mich Hansen, Keeley Hawes, Robert S. Nevil, Thomas Troelsen, Yoon Hye Joo	Harvest Moon	2013
"What's My Name?"	Seo Jae Woo, Seo Young Bae	Name is 4Minute	2013
"What’s Your Name?"	Brave Brothers, Kokki, Lee Kingdom	Name is 4Minute	2013
"Whatever"	D3O, Aileen De La Cruz, Kim Taeho	Name is 4Minute	2013

== Y ==
Song	Writer	Album	Year
"You Know"	Im Sang-hyuk, Da9297	4minutes Left	2011

== Other songs ==
Song	Album	Year
"Jingle Jingle"	None	2009
"Freestyle"	None	2011
