= Best of 4Minute =

- Regular edition cover

Compilation album by 4Minute
- Released: September 26, 2012
- Recorded: 2009–2012
- Genre: J-pop; dance-pop; electropop
- Length: 50:51
- Language: Japanese
- Label: Far Eastern Tribe

4Minute chronology
| Volume Up (2012) | Best of 4Minute (2012) | Name Is 4Minute (2013) |

Singles from Best of 4Minute
- 1. "Dreams Come True" Released: October 27, 2010; 2. "Why" Released: March 9, 2011; 3. "Heart to Heart" Released: September 7, 2011; 4. "Ready Go" Released: December 7, 2011; 5. "Love Tension" Released: August 22, 2012

Best of 4Minute is the first Japanese compilation album by the South Korean girl group 4Minute. It is composed of all the Japanese tracks released by the group since their debut in Japan. It was released on September 26, 2012 in three different editions: 2 limited CD+DVD (Type A with a live event and Type B with all Japanese music videos) and a Regular edition.

== Background and composition ==
The album includes tracks released by the group since their debut in Japan in 2010, all singles, some b-sides and album tracks. The album was released in three different editions: 2 CD+DVD, Type A includes the live event "4Minute Live Energy Vol.2 "Diamond" 2010.12.04 Zepp Tokyo", Type B has all Japanese music videos released at the date and a regular edition, with only the CD itself. The album also includes the song "Goodbye", b-side of the single "I My Me Mine", two songs from the album Diamond, "Can't Make Up My Mind" and "December" and a Japanese version of their debut song "Hot Issue", previously unreleased. The art covers of the album features individual photos of the girls and jacket covers of the group's past releases.

== Singles ==
The album includes five singles that were not included in any album or compilation release:

The first single is the song "Dreams Come True", which was released as a double A-side single along with "First". "First" was included on the group's Japanese debut album Diamond. The single was released in October 24, 2010 and sold around 6,500 copies of the physical single at the date.

The second single is the song "Why", released on March 9, 2011. At the date, it is the most successfully selling single of the group with around 15,000 copies sold physically. It ranked #17 on Oricon's weekly chart. The song was chosen as theme song for the Japanese drama Akuto~Juuhanzai Sousa Han. Promotions ended quickly due to the 2011 Tōhoku earthquake and tsunami, and the group's only TV performance was on Happy Music.

The third single is a Japanese version of the song "Heart to Heart", released on September 7, 2011, alongside the group's first DVD Emerald of 4minute. The physical single sold around 10,000 copies at the date and reached number 18 on the Oricon weekly chart. The original version of the song is the first single of the group's first Korean studio album 4minutes Left. The song's music video was released on August 15, in the Universal Music Japan's official YouTube account. It differs from the Korean music video, omitting a storyline and showing more solo and choreographed dance shots.

The fourth single is the song "Ready Go", released on December 7, 2011. The full music video was released exclusively on the music channel MTV Japan on November 11. The physical single sold around 8,000 copies, peaking at No. 23 on Oricon's weekly singles chart. It also charted at No. 1 on Gaon's international singles chart and No. 100 on the RIAJ Digital Track Chart. The B-Side is a Japanese version of "Sweet Suga Honey!", previously released on 4Minute's first Korean album 4minutes Left. "Ready Go" was used as opening theme song for the Japanese drama Welcome to the El-Palacio.

The fifth and final single is the song "Love Tension", released on August 22, 2012. The music video premiered exclusively on MTV Japan on August 4. The physical single was the most unsuccessfully selling single of the group in Japan, with 3,701 copies sold in the first week. It ranked No. 26 on Oricon's weekly singles chart. The B-side, a Japanese version of "Volume Up", was also included on the album. The original version of the song is the lead single of the group's third mini album of same name.

== Track listing ==
All editions track listing
| No. | Title | Lyrics | Music | Length |
|---|---|---|---|---|
| 1. | "Hot Issue" (Japanese version) | Shinsadong Tiger, Hey J, Rina Moon (Japanese lyrics) | Shinsadong Tiger, Lee Chae-kyu | 3:28 |
| 2. | "Muzik" (Japanese version) | Lee Sang-ho, Shinsadong Tiger | Lee Sang-ho, Shinsadong Tiger | 3:44 |
| 3. | "I My Me Mine" (Japanese version) | Michiko Motohashi | Shinsadong Tiger | 3:25 |
| 4. | "Goodbye" (グッバイ; Gubbai) | Hidehiko Morino | Hidehiko Morino, Takashi Fukuda | 4:14 |
| 5. | "First" | Shinsadong Tiger, Kanata Okajima (Japanese lyrics) | Shinsadong Tiger | 3:31 |
| 6. | "Dreams Come True" (Japanese version) | Kim Dong-hyon, Kanata Okajima (Japanese lyrics) | Kim Dong-hyon | 3:21 |
| 7. | "Can't Make Up My Mind" | HOOKs | Jeff Miyahara, Hiromi | 3:41 |
| 8. | "December" | Nao | Nao | 3:58 |
| 9. | "Why" | Rhymer, MasterKey, Kanata Okajima | Rhymer, MasterKey | 3:09 |
| 10. | "Heart to Heart" (Japanese version) | Shinsadong Tiger, Choi Kyu-sung, Rina Moon (Japanese lyrics) | Shinsadong Tiger, Choi Kyu-sung | 3:51 |
| 11. | "Ready Go" | Jang Jun-ho, Gong Hyun-sik, Leessang, Seo Jae-woo, Kim Tae-ho, Rina Moon (Japanese lyrics) | Jang Jun-ho, Gong Hyun-sik | 3:32 |
| 12. | "Sweet Suga Honey!" (Japanese version) | Jang Jun-ho, Rina Moon (Japanese lyrics) | Jang Jun-ho, Gong Hyun-sik | 3:26 |
| 13. | "Love Tension" | Kim Do-hoon, Lee Sang-ho, Rina Moon (Japanese lyrics) | Kim Do-hoon, Lee Sang-ho | 3:46 |
| 14. | "Volume Up" (Japanese version) | Shinsadong Tiger, Rado, Hue-U, Rina Moon (Japanese lyrics) | Shinsadong Tiger, Rado | 3:50 |
| Total length: | | | | 50:51 |

DVD (CD+DVD Type A): 4Minute Live Energy Vol.2 "Diamond" 2010.12.04 Zepp Tokyo
| No. | Title | Length |
|---|---|---|
| 1. | "Muzik" (Japanese version) |
| 2. | "HUH" |
| 3. | "Invitation" |
| 4. | "I My Me Mine" (Japanese version) |
| 5. | "What a Girl Wants" |
| 6. | "Cool And Natural" (태연하게 당연하게; Taeyeonhage Dangyeonhage) |
| 7. | "Won't Give You" (안줄래; Anjullae) |
| 8. | "Dreams Come True" (Japanese version) |
| 9. | "Highlight" |
| 10. | "Hot Issue" |
| 11. | "First" |
| 12. | "Hot Issue / Muzik" (Encore) |
| 13. | "First" (Encore) |

DVD (CD+DVD Type B): Music videos
| No. | Title | Length |
|---|---|---|
| 1. | "Muzik" (Music video - Japanese version) |
| 2. | "I My Me Mine" (Music video - Japanese version) |
| 3. | "First" (Music video) |
| 4. | "Why" (Music video) |
| 5. | "Heart to Heart" (Music video - Japanese version) |
| 6. | "Ready Go" (Music video) |
| 7. | "Love Tension" (Music video) |

== Chart performance ==
=== Oricon ===
| Released | Oricon Chart | Peak | Debut sales | Sales total |
|---|---|---|---|---|
| September 26, 2012 | Daily Albums Chart | 24 | 3,759 (Weekly) | 6,110 |
| September 26, 2012 | Weekly Albums Chart | 37 | 3,759 (Weekly) | 6,110 |

== Release history ==
| Country | Date | Format | Label |
|---|---|---|---|
| Japan | September 26, 2012 | CD, Digital download | Far Eastern Tribe Records |
