= Volume Up =

Volume Up may refer to:

- Volume Up (radio show)
- Volume Up, album by Maine band Rustic Overtones 1999
- Volume Up (EP), by Korean band 4Minute
- "Volume Up", song by 4Minute from Volume Up (EP)
