= Hot Issue =

Hot Issue may refer to:

- Hot Issue (group), a South Korean girl group formed by S2 Entertainment in 2021
- Hot Issue (EP), a 2007 extended play by South Korean musical group Big Bang
- "Hot Issue" (song), a song by South Korean musical group 4minute
- Harisu (born 1975), South Korea's first transgender entertainer
