= 4Minute World =

EP by 4Minute
- Released: March 17, 2014
- Genre: K-pop; electropop; dance-pop
- Length: 17:00
- Label: Cube; Universal Music

4Minute chronology
Name Is 4Minute (2013)	4Minute World (2014)	Crazy (2015)

Singles from 4Minute World
- 1. "Whatcha Doin' Today" Released: March 17, 2014; 2. "Thank You :)" Released: June 18, 2014

4Minute World is the fifth extended play by South Korean girl group 4Minute, released on March 17, 2014. It features the lead single "Whatcha Doin' Today".

== Promotion and release ==
On March 8, the lead single was confirmed to be "Whatcha Doin' Today" The lead single video was released on March 16 under the title "오늘 뭐해 (Whatcha Doin' Today)" and the full EP was released on March 17. "Whatcha Doin' Today" reached number 1 on the weekly Gaon Digital Chart and number 4 on the Billboard K-pop Hot 100. On June 18, 2014, the group released the music video for the track "Thank You" to celebrate their fifth anniversary.

== Accolades ==
Music program awards for "Whatcha Doin' Today"
Program	Date	Ref.
Inkigayo	March 30, 2014	
M Countdown	April 3, 2014	

== Track listing ==
4Minute World track listing
No.	Title	Lyrics	Music	Arrangement	Length
1.	"Wait a Minute"	Lim Sang-hyuk, Astro Z, Ludwig Lindell	Lim Sang-hyuk Astro Z, Daniel Caesar	Lim Sang-hyuk, Astro Z, Daniel Caesar, Ludwig Lindell	3:10
2.	"Whatcha Doin' Today" (오늘 뭐해; Oneul Mwohae)	Brave Brothers	Brave Brothers, Elephant Kingdom	Brave Brothers, Elephant Kingdom, Lee Jeong-min	3:26
3.	"I'll Teach You" (알려 줄게; Allyeo Julgye) (Nam Jihyun, Jeon Ji-yoon, Kwon So-hyun)	Esna	Seo Jae-woo, Esna	Seo Jae-woo	3:08
4.	"Come In" (들어와; Deureowa) (Kim Hyuna, Heo Ga-yoon)	Park Soo-seok, Park Eun-ooh, Sleepy	Park Soo-seok, Park Eun-ooh	Park Soo-seok	3:34
5.	"Thank You :)" (고마워; Gomawo)	Kwon So-hyun, Kim Hyuna, Seo Jae-woo	Seo Jae-woo, Ferdy	Seo Jae-woo, Ferdy	3:54
Total length:					17:12

== Charts ==
=== Album ===
Chart	Peak position
Gaon Weekly album chart	2
Gaon Monthly album chart	15

=== Sales and certifications ===
Chart	Amount
Gaon physical sales	11,231
