= Kwon So-hyun =

South Korean actress (born 1994)

- 권소현
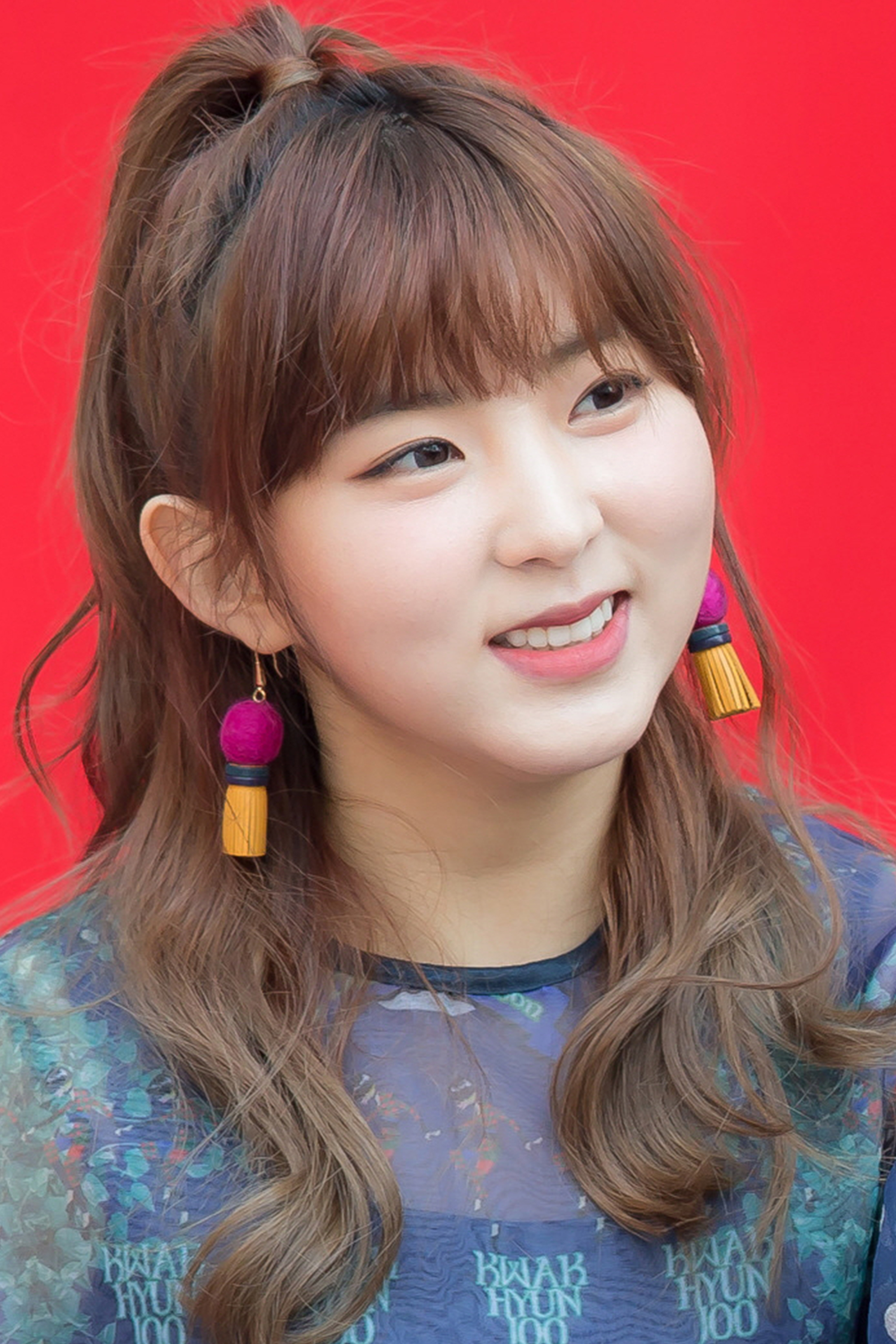
- Kwon in March 2016
- Born: August 30, 1994 (age 32); Incheon, South Korea
- Education: Dongguk University – Department of Theatre and Film
- Occupations: Actress; singer
- Years active: 2005–present
- Agent: Cube Entertainment
- Musical career
- Genre: K-pop
- Instrument: Vocals
- Years active: 2005–2016
- Labels: Cube; 935; The CNT
- Formerly of: Orange; 4Minute; United Cube

Korean name
- Hangul: 권소현
- Hanja: 權昭賢
- RR: Gwon Sohyeon
- MR: Kwŏn Sohyŏn

Kwon So-hyun (Korean: 권소현; born August 30, 1994), also known by the stage name Sohyun, is a South Korean actress and singer. She debuted as a member of the girl group Orange in 2005 and later became a member of 4Minute, which debuted under Cube Entertainment in 2009. In June 2016, 4Minute disbanded, and Kwon, along with fellow members Nam Ji-hyun, Heo Ga-yoon, and Jeon Ji-yoon, left Cube Entertainment after their contracts expired on June 14. She rejoined Cube Entertainment in September 2025 to pursue her acting career.

== Early life ==
Kwon was born in Incheon, South Korea, on August 30, 1994. She attended Kumho Girls' Middle School and Pungmoon Girls' High School, graduating from the latter in February 2013. She was reported to have ranked fourth in her class during an episode of Infinity Challenge. In November 2014, it was reported that Kwon had been accepted into Dongguk University's Department of Theatre and Film.

Kwon debuted as a member of the group Orange in 2005. The group released its debut single, We Are "Orange", on November 18, 2005, with "Our Star" as its title track. The group's activities were short-lived. Kwon later recalled that she had been hurt by malicious online comments and anti-fan communities during this period, and that she had experienced social isolation at school.

Kwon said that she began auditioning after an older student from her middle school debuted as a singer. She was later among the members scouted by CUBE Entertainment to join the planned lineup of 4Minute. The group was expanded around Heo Ga-yoon, while Soyou, who had initially been set to debut with Heo, was dropped after an image test.

== Career ==
=== 4Minute and solo activities ===
In June 2009, Kwon debuted as the youngest member of the girl group 4Minute under Cube Entertainment, with their debut single "Hot Issue".

Aside from her activities with 4Minute, Kwon appeared in television variety programmes and music videos. She appeared as L.Joe's love interest in Teen Top's music video for "Going Crazy".

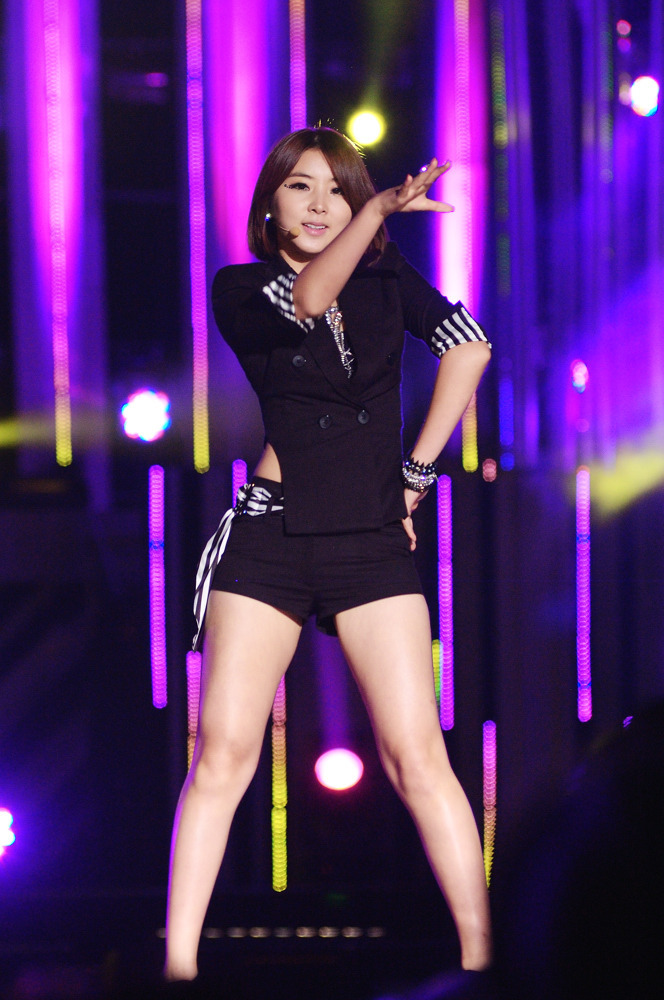
Kwon performing at the Hallyu Dream Concert in 2011

Kwon, along with 11 other female idols, took part in the KBS Lunar New Year special Princess Project – Resurrection of the Royal Family, which aired on January 23, 2012.

Kwon was selected as a special MC for the second Weekly Idol Awards in December 2012.

Kwon, along with teammates Heo Ga-yoon and Nam Ji-hyun, took part in the archery segment of the 2013 Idol Star Athletics-Archery Championships. The team later competed in another archery competition against Sistar on Dream Team in June.

On June 5, 2013, Kwon and Heo took part in the ceremonial first pitch event for the LG Twins against the Doosan Bears. Heo threw the first pitch while Kwon stood at home plate to bat.

On October 22, 2013, it was announced that Kwon would make her feature-film debut as the lead in Hwanggu, playing Mi-su, a college student who supports her boyfriend as he pursues a national taekwondo title.

At the 2014 Idol Star Athletics Championships, Kwon reached the final of the women's archery competition and won the gold medal by defeating Sistar's Bora.

In 2015, Kwon joined Chamsonyeo, a project girl group formed for Hitmaker, alongside G.NA, After School's Lizzy, and Kara's Youngji. The group released its song "Magic Words" and accompanying music video in February 2015.

=== Post-disbandment and acting career ===
After the disbandment of 4Minute, Kwon left Cube Entertainment and joined 935 Entertainment. She switched to TheCNT three years later. She made a cameo appearance as a victim in Criminal Minds and landed more substantial roles in the romantic comedy The Secret Life of My Secretary and the thriller Class of Lies.

On September 4, 2025, Kwon signed an exclusive contract with Cube Entertainment to pursue her acting career under the agency. In October 2026, she revealed that she was also working as a producer at Cube Entertainment, where she was responsible for planning and A&R work for the Japanese album of the girl group LIGHTSUM, while continuing her acting career.

== Discography ==
=== Extended plays ===
Title	Album details
We Are Orange	Released: 2005; Label: Unknown; Format: CD, digital download

=== Featured songs ===
Year	Album	Song	Duration	Artist
2014	Brave Brothers' Anniversary Album	"Only Gained Weight"	3:10	Duet with Hyuna and Gayoon
2015	Non-album single	"Magic Words"	3:34	With Lizzy, G.NA and Youngji as Chamsonyeo

=== List of songs written by Kwon ===
Year	Album	Song	Lyrics		Music	
Year	Album	Song	Credited	With	Credited	With
2016	Act. 7	"Blind"	Yes	Jenyer; Hyuna	No	Im Kwang-wook; Ryan Kim; Hunnykilla; Amanda Moseley

== Filmography ==
=== Film ===
Year	Title	Role	Notes	Ref.
2014	Hwanggu	Mi-su		
2017	My Last Love	Kim Dal-nim		
2019	Birthday	Eun-bin		
2019	Black Money	Park So-hyun		
2019	A Little Princess	Jin-joo		
2020	Run Boy Run	Ji-woo		
2022	That Winter, I	Hye-jin		
2024	Deliver	Mi-ja		
2025	Manhole	Sun-joo		
2026	Tango at Dawn	Joo-hee		

=== Television series ===
Year	Title	Role	Notes	Ref.
2003	Jewel in the Palace		Cameo	
2004	Jang Gil San		Cameo	
2004	Lovers in Paris		Cameo	
2010	High Kick Through the Roof	Member of SKINI	Special appearance	
2017	Criminal Minds	Kwon Yoo-jin		
2019	The Secret Life of My Secretary	Ha Ri-ra		
2019	Class of Lies	Seo Yoon-ah		
2022	Love All Play	Chun Yu-ri		
2022	The Killer's Shopping List	Lee Kyung-ah		
2023	My Perfect Stranger	Lee Eun-ha		
2026	Love in Sync	Han Yi-jin		

== Theater ==
Theater play performance
Year	Title		Role	Theater	Date	Ref.
Year	English	Korean	Role	Theater	Date	Ref.
2026	JeongHee	정희	JungHee	Yes24 Art One Hall 3	March 31, 2026, to June 14	
