= Hit Your Heart =

HuH (Hit Your Heart)

EP by 4Minute
- Released: May 19, 2010
- Recorded: Early 2010
- Genre: K-pop; electropop; dance-pop
- Length: 23:34
- Label: Cube; Universal Music
- Producer: Hong Seung-Sung

4Minute chronology
| For Muzik (2009) | HuH (Hit Your Heart) (2010) | Diamond (2010) |

Singles from HuH (Hit Your Heart)
- 1. "HuH" Released: May 19, 2010; 2. "I My Me Mine" Released: July 2, 2010

Hit Your Heart (HuH) is the second extended play by South Korean girl group 4Minute. The mini-album was released on May 19, 2010, and contains seven tracks. "HuH" was being used as the promotional song for the mini-album. The song debuted at number five on South Korea's Gaon Digital Chart and reached number three for two weeks. The mini-album debuted at number three on the Gaon Album Chart on May 30. Promotions for the mini-album in South Korea continued with "I My Me Mine", which later received a single release in Japan.

== Promotion ==
"HuH" was first used as a promotional track from the album. The music video premiered on May 19, 2010, along with Hit Your Heart's release. Within hours of album's release, the song debuted at number five on South Korea's Gaon Singles Chart and later peaked at number three for two weeks. 4minute had their debut performances of "HuH" on Mnet's M! Countdown, KBS's Music Bank, MBC's Show! Music Core and SBS's Inkigayo from May 20–23.

The music video for "HuH" starts with their song "Who's Next" which features label mates Beast introducing 4minute, while 4minute walks in a dark background. The members then sing in the desert, along the part the video transitions to each individual. Member Jeon Ji-yoon sings outside of an apartment, Heo Ga-yoon has a couch as her background, Nam Ji-hyun sits on a big chair, Kim Hyuna has a motorcycle on her background, and Kwon So-hyun is in a cap store. In the second verse the members transition to mechanics in a parking lot. By the end of the song the scene shifts between the desert, the parking lot, and their solo concepts.

After promotions with "HuH" ended, fourth track "I My Me Mine" was then used to promote the Hit Your Heart. 4minute had their debut performance with the song on July 1 on Mnet's M! Countdown. A teaser was released online for a music video, shortly after their live performance on M! Countdown. The full music video was released on July 5, 2010. The song placed at number 9 on Gaon's weekly chart and number 7 on the monthly chart. It finished 2010 at number 70 on the yearly chart.

== Track listing ==
| No. | Title | Lyrics | Music | Length |
|---|---|---|---|---|
| 1. | "Who's Next?" (featuring Beast) | Shinsadong Tiger | Shinsadong Tiger | 1:57 |
| 2. | "HuH" | Shinsadong Tiger, Yong Jun Hyung | Shinsadong Tiger | 3:48 |
| 3. | "Invitation" | Shinsadong Tiger | Im Sang-hyuk, Shinsadong Tiger | 3:20 |
| 4. | "I My Me Mine" | Lee Sang-ho, Shinsadong Tiger | Lee Sang-ho, Shinsadong Tiger | 3:24 |
| 5. | "Bababa" | Kang Ji-won, Kim Ki-bum | Kang Ji-won, Kim Ki-bum | 3:24 |
| 6. | "Highlight" | Kang Ji-won, Kim Ki-bum | Kang Ji-won, Kim Ki-bum | 3:28 |
| 7. | "Cool and Natural" (태연하게 당연하게; Taeyeonhage Dangyeonhage) | Kim Ki-bum, Kang Ji-won | Kim Ki-bum | 4:01 |

== Charts ==
=== Sales and certifications ===
| Chart (2010+2011) | Amount |
|---|---|
| Gaon physical sales | 26,109 |

== Release history ==
- South Korea: May 19, 2010
- Philippines: September 4, 2010
