= 2Yoon =

South Korean girl group

- Origin: Seoul, South Korea
- Genres: K-pop
- Years active: 2013
- Label: Cube
- Spinoff of: 4Minute
- Past members: Gayoon; Jiyoon
- Website: 4min.co.kr

2Yoon (Korean: 투윤, commonly stylized in all caps) was the first and only sub-group of South Korean girl group 4Minute, formed by Cube Entertainment in 2013. The sub-group consisted of Gayoon and Jiyoon.

== History ==
Gayoon and Jiyoon were the lead singers of 4Minute. Cube Entertainment CEO Hong Seung Sung wanted to pair them in a sub-group after watching the duo perform live at the 2011 United Cube in London.

The duo were known to fans collectively as Ssangyoon (쌍윤) (a portmanteau of the Hangul word for "twins" and the last characters of their given name "yoon"). However, as the pronunciation of "Ssangyoon" involves a tensed consonant, it was deemed to be ill-fitting for the group's cute image. As such, the sub-unit was renamed as 2Yoon. In addition, "ssangyoon" could be potentially misheard as a profanity, further supporting the basis for the name change.

2Yoon appeared on MBC's Weekly Idol as Ssangyoon, since the show was recorded before the official name change.

== Career ==
On January 7, 2013, Cube Entertainment announced that the 2Yoon debut album, Harvest Moon, was slated for a mid-January release, with "24/7" confirmed as the title track. On January 22, 2013, 2YOON released its album and accompanying music video for "24/7." 2Yoon made its television debut on M! Countdown on January 18, 2013.

2Yoon's members revealed through an interview that they felt motivated and encouraged by Girls' Generation members after a listening session. Gayoon, through another interview, also revealed she lost weight rehearsing to the song's choreography. Due to their innovative efforts, Time Magazine showed interest in 2Yoon's music and observed Korea's potential in the world's music scene. 2Yoon became the first Korean girl group to be interviewed by Time. In the interview with TIME, the members cited that they listened to artists like Carrie Underwood and Taylor Swift, and that they were used as inspiration to the recording sessions.

== 24/7 ==
Marc Hogan of Spin called 2Yoon's "24/7" music video "as giddily irresistible as you'd hope", commending the pair for incorporating elements of country music without losing the "characteristically hyper-melodic, electronica"-ness of K-pop. Lily Rothman of Time lauded 2Yoon for attempting the "unlikely union" of country music and K-pop, showing the symbiotic influence that both American-music and K-pop exert on each other. Park Hyun-min of Mnet praised the "light and joyous" execution of the lead single.

"24/7" received polarized reviews, some praising its innovative attempt into bringing country music to Korean pop, while others criticized such aspects as its melody, lyrics, rap style and technique, claiming the song as an experimental failure.

== Artistry ==
2Yoon has been praised by both foreign and domestic music magazines for being the first K-Pop act to release a country-inspired track.

2Yoon became the first sub-unit of a Korean music group to be promoted in Thailand, performing and giving interviews.

== Discography ==
=== Extended play ===
Title	Album details	Peak chart positions	Sales
Title	Album details	KOR	Sales
Harvest Moon	Released: January 22, 2013; Label: Cube Entertainment; Formats: CD, digital download	7	KOR: 5,372

=== Singles ===
Title	Year	Peak chart positions		Sales	Album
Title	Year	KOR	KOR Hot	Sales	Album
"24/7"	2013	8	13	KOR: 572,159	Harvest Moon
