= Crazy (4Minute EP) =

EP by 4Minute
- Released: February 9, 2015
- Genres: Hip hop; trap; dance; Europop; funk; disco
- Length: 20:06
- Labels: Cube; Universal Music

4Minute chronology
4Minute World (2014)	Crazy (2015)	Act. 7 (2016)

Singles from Crazy
- 1. "Cold Rain" Released: January 26, 2015; 2. "Crazy" Released: February 9, 2015

Crazy is the sixth extended play (EP) by South Korean girl group 4Minute. It was released on February 9, 2015, by Cube Entertainment and distributed by Universal Music Group. It was the group's first offering in 11 months since the release of 4Minute World (2014). The EP marked a shift towards a bolder concept and fresh direction for the group and contains six songs. Musically, the album is characterized by the group's signature hip hop sound, while also encompassing several other genres including, trap, dance, Europop, funk, disco and rock.

Upon release, Crazy received generally favourable reviews from music critics, who praised its production, musical direction and the group's vocal performance. Commercially, the album debuted and peaked at number two on South Korea's Gaon Album Chart, and became the fourth best-selling album of February 2015 in the country. It also peaked at number one on the Billboard World Albums chart. The album spawned two lead singles: "Cold Rain" and "Crazy". The former was the first time the group used a ballad as its lead single since their debut; it was released on January 26, 2015, for digital purchase. The title track was released in conjunction with the release of the album, and was subjected to major attention from Western media, with many critics regarding it as one of the best K-pop releases of 2015. It was commercially successful in South Korea and peaked at number three on the Gaon Digital Chart. The song also appeared at number two on the US World Digital Songs chart.

Two music videos were released to accompany to the release of the singles. To promote the album, 4Minutes appeared and performed on several South Korean music programs, including Music Bank, Show! Music Core, and Inkigayo. The group won a total of seven first-place music show awards. The group also held a solo concert in Myanmar, where they performed material from the album.

== Background and release ==
Following the release of their fifth extended play 4Minute World in 2014, South Korean girl group 4Minute went on a year-long hiatus. On January 23, the group announced their return to music with their sixth extended play, titled Crazy. It was announced that the album would be supported by two lead singles. "Cold Rain" was made available for digital download and streaming as the first lead single from the album on January 26, 2015, by Cube Entertainment. As opposed to 4Minutes' signature hip hop and electronic styles, "Cold Rain" was the group's first lead-single ballad since their debut. The album was released digitally worldwide on February 9, 2015, by Cube Entertainment and Kakao M. In South Korea, the album was distributed digitally and physically by Cube Entertainment and Universal Music Group. The title track was serviced as the second lead single of the album. The album showcases a bolder concept and "fresh" sonic direction for the group than their past releases.

"For the past two releases, we came out with songs that were easy to listen to, and focused on the general public with easy-to-follow concepts. Matter of fact, we actually went back to the "classic" 4Minute vibe with Crazy, but with a bolder spin on it."

— Gayoon on Crazy's sonic direction, Vice.

== Composition ==
Crazy keeps up with 4Minutes' signature hip hop and EDM sounds that the group cultivated through its previous albums while also encompassing several genres. The opening track "Crazy" has lyrics written by Seo Jae-woo, Big Ssancho, group member Hyuna and Son Young-jin, with the latter of the four also handling production. It has been described as a hip hop and trap-infused dance track that recalls the "urban-edginess" of the group's early tracks. The song uses low-pitched beats, twisted horn hooks and siren-like synths in its production. It makes use of a strong "throbbing" bassline and turbo-powered drum machines, while utilizing "trumpeting" synths and Middle Eastern-style flutes in its breakdown. Driven by heavy brass loops, the song changes direction in a "build-up-drop-down drop-off" pattern, deriving its style from EDM. The song features "sharp" rap verses from Jiyoon and HyunA complemented by "pulsing" vocals from Sohyun and Jihyun, and held together by melodic pre-chorus belts of Gayoon. During its lyrics, the group taunts the listener into its titular craziness and urges them to have fun.

"Cut It Out" is hybrid of trap and Europop genres and draws influences from '90s music. The song utilizes synth-based production and "demon-voiced" heavy vocals. It was written by Misfit, while produced by Seo Jae-woo, Im Kwang-wook, Ryan Kim and Mistazo. "Tickle Tickle Tickle" is a dance track with lyrics written by group member So-hyun. "Stand Out" featuring Manager is a funk and disco song, while "Show Me" incorporates elements of rock. A downtempo ballad, "Cold Rain" features guitar strums and "dreamy" piano chords in its production. The song is further instrumented by "quirky" synth sounds and powerful beats. It uses "breathy coos" and doleful raps over multiple hooks. The lyrics find them taking about being ignorant in love.

== Reception ==
Crazy received generally favourable reviews from music critics. Jakob Dorof from Spin magazine listed the album as one of the K-pop highlights of 2015. He praised the title track "Crazy" for its production and the group's performance, and also regarded the track "Cut It Out" as a "deft blend." He chose the single "Cold Rain" as the outlier of the album for its musical style and wrote, "that's the real surprise, like a classic No Doubt lament co-written by a Tin Pan Alley tunesmith on one of his jazz kicks." In his review for Vice, Dorof further wrote that the album "finds the troupe exploring fresh territory and kicking ass while doing so." He picked "Cut It Out" and "Tickle Tickle Tickle" as the album highlights, for the former's "trap versus Europop double-kill" and the latter's "cocksure funk strut." At the same, he deemed the singles for "strik[ing] a resonant chord." He labelled "Cold Rain" as a "morose masterstroke" and favoured "Crazy" for pushing "hot genres like trap and EDM harder and farther than pretty much anybody in global mainstream music." Writing for Billboard, Jeff Benjamin felt "Cold Rain" highlighted "4Minute's vocal chops, heartfelt rapping and sensitive sensibilities for a captivating K-pop comeback," and praised "Crazy" for its fierce production and the group's energetic vocal performance. In another review for Fuse, Benjamin included the latter as one of the 10 best dance songs of February 2015, and labelled it as "one of the biggest club bangers" of the year.

Scott Interrante from PopMatters described "Crazy" as "loud and aggressive" and felt that "everything about the song, from the rapid-fire rapping" to the production and the group's "sharp choreography" translated into "crazy." Hwang Sun-up of IZM called the song's production "outstanding" which he felt blended with the imagery and concept of the track and also praised the group's vocal performance. Music critic Tamar Herman labelled "Crazy" as "one of the fiercest K-pop song of the decade and the highlight of 4Minute's career", while praising the song's "off-kilter composition." "Crazy" was listed as the best K-pop girl group song (sixth overall) of 2015 by Billboard, with the publication lauding the group's return to hip hop sound and the track's "swaggering instrumental breakdown."

Commercially, the album debuted at number two on the Gaon Album Chart on the chart issue dated February 23, 2015, and was the fourth best-selling album of February 2015. The first single, "Cold Rain" debuted at number 15 on the Gaon Digital Chart on the issue dated January 31, 2015, which later became its peak. The title track debuted and peaked at number three on the Digital Chart on the chart issue dated February 8–14, 2015. "Crazy" was the sixth best-performing song of February 2015. In addition, the album peaked at number one on the Billboard World Albums Chart on March 23, 2015, while "Crazy" peaked at number two on Billboard World Digital Song Sales chart on the week of March 21, 2015. The EP has sold over 22,102 copies in South Korea.

== Promotion and music videos ==
In the lead-up to the release of the album, the group released teasers of all the tracks, serving as a promotional tool for their return. An accompanying music video for the album's pre-release single, "Cold Rain" was uploaded to the group's official YouTube channel on January 26, 2015. The music video for "Crazy" was released on February 9, 2015, to accompany the release of the album. For the visual, a choreography by Parris Goebel was commissioned, who had previously worked with Jennifer Lopez. Portrayed in black and white, the video features "moving camera-angle" shots of the group performing "non-stop" choreography while wearing sportswear and bucket hats. Scott Interrante from PopMatters wrote that "The hair styles and fashion, along with many of the girls’ postures and poses, specifically recall American hip-hop culture, and subsequently African-American culture." Jeff Benjamin from Billboard felt that the "multiple line changes" throughout the dance-routine made it "one of K-pop's top dances to watch for on the live stage." For music critic Dorof, the video contained "some of the year's fiercest choreo[graphy]." The song impacted Korean Broadcasting System's "K-Pop Connection" radio on February 10, 2015. On November 5, 2017, the music video for "Crazy" hit 100 million views on YouTube, making 4Minute the sixth K-pop girl group to achieve the milestone.

Following the release of the record, 4Minute appeared and performed on several South Korean music programs. Its first televised live performance was on Mnet's M Countdown! on February 12, 2015, where the group performed "Crazy" and "Cut It Out". The group subsequently appeared on KBS's Music Bank, MBC's Show! Music Core, and SBS' Inkigayo, on the three following days, respectively. In the second week of promotion, "Crazy" won first place on MBC Music's Show Champion on February 18. This was followed by wins on M Countdown!, Inkigayo and Show! Music Core. The group's win on the latter marked their first music show win on Show! Music Core after seven year since their debut. They concluded promotion for the album on March 15, with a performance on Inkigayo, winning a total of seven music show awards. On April 4, 2015, the group held a solo concert titled 4Minute Fan Bash In Myanmar in Yangon, Myanmar, where they performed material from the album.

== Track listing ==
No.	Title	Lyrics	Music	Arrangement	Length
1.	"Crazy" (미쳐; Michyeo)	Seo Jae-woo; Big Ssancho; Son Young-jin (MosPick); Kim Hyun-a	Seo Jae-woo; Big Ssancho; Son Young-jin (MosPick)	Seo Jae-woo; Big Ssancho; Son Young-jin (MosPick)	03:10
2.	"Cut It Out" (1절만 하시죠; Ilcheolman Hasijyo)	Misfit	Seo Jae-woo; Im Kwang-wook; Ryan Kim; Mistazo	Im Kwang-wook; Ryan Kim, Mistazo; Seo Jae-woo	03:21
3.	"Tickle Tickle Tickle"	Kwon So-hyun; Big Ssancho	Adam Kulling; Alice Gernandt	Adam Kulling; Alice Gernandt	03:05
4.	"Stand Out" (눈에 띄네; Nune Ttuine) (feat. Manager)	Big Ssancho; Jenyer	Big Ssancho; Jenyer	Big Ssancho; Jenyer	03:39
5.	"Show Me"	Big Ssancho; Kim Hyun-a; Kwon So-hyun	Seo Jae-woo; Son Young-jin (MosPick); Lee Brian D	Seo Jae-woo; Son Young-jin (MosPick); Lee Brian D	03:09
6.	"Cold Rain" (추운 비; Chuun Bi)	Son Young-jin (MosPick); Jo Sung-ho	Son Young-jin (MosPick); Jo Sung-ho	Son Young-jin (MosPick); Jo Sung-ho	03:39
Total length:					20:06

== Charts ==
Chart	Peak position
Gaon Weekly album chart	2
Gaon Monthly album chart	4
Billboard World Albums Chart	1
