= Name Is 4Minute =

EP by 4Minute
- Released: April 26, 2013
- Genre: K-pop; electropop; dance-pop
- Length: 14:13
- Label: Cube; Universal Music

4Minute chronology
Best of 4Minute (2012)	Name Is 4Minute (2013)	4Minute World (2014)

Singles from Name Is 4Minute
- 1. "What's Your Name?" Released: April 26, 2013

Name Is 4Minute is the fourth extended play by South Korean girl group 4Minute, released on April 26, 2013. It features the lead single "What's Your Name?", which became the group's most successful single after peaking at number one on the Gaon Singles Chart and being one of the best selling singles of the year.

== Background ==
On February 4, 2013, Cube Entertainment announced that 4Minute would release new material in the first half of the year. It was further explained that their new music would more closely resemble their debut sound, more "groovy and powerful" according to their record label Cube Entertainment.

The mini-album includes the single "What's Your Name?" which was produced by Brave Brothers. It features a "hip-hop style where it uses unique sounds and has a fast-paced and rhythm-packed melody". The single is preceded by "What's My Name?" which introduces the track. Three other songs follow: "Whatever" is described by the album's producers as "unique". "Gimme That" is an "ambitious" song that "asks a man to show his manly side for love". "Domino" is described as a "strong hip hop and blues genre, together with a powerful rocking melody."

== Promotion and release ==
On April 19, the lead single was confirmed to be “What’s Your Name?”. The EP was intended to be released April 25, however, because of additional music video filming for the title track "What's Your Name?", on April 19, Cube delayed the release to the 26th, “Although it’s just one day, to console the fans about the delay, we’ll prepare it to the best of our ability.” The music video premiered on April 26 on the same day of the album's release.

The group promoted the song "What's Your Name?" on music shows along with the track "Whatever". "What's Your Name?" reached number 1 on the weekly Gaon chart and the Billboard Korea K-Pop Hot 100. It was also number 6 on Gaon's year-end chart for 2013.

On May 6, Hyuna suddenly fainted due to high fever and dehydration, and was hospitalized on May 7. Cube announced that the other four members would continue with the promotions and performances. Hyuna rejoined the group for the May 16 performance on M! Countdown

== Accolades ==
Music program awards for "What's Your Name?"
Program	Date
Show Champion	May 8, 2013
Show Champion	May 15, 2013
Show Champion	May 22, 2013
M Countdown	May 9, 2013
M Countdown	May 16, 2013
Inkigayo	May 19, 2013
Inkigayo	May 26, 2013

== Track listing ==
No.	Title	Lyrics	Music	Length
1.	"What's My Name?"	Seo Jae-woo, Seo Young-bae	Seo Jae-woo, Seo Young-bae	1:19
2.	"What's Your Name?" (이름이 뭐예요?; Ireumi Mwoyeyo?)	Brave Brothers	Brave Brothers, Elephant Kingdom	3:06
3.	"Whatever"	Kim Tae-ho, D3O, Aileen De La Cruz	D3O, Aileen De La Cruz, Seo Jae-woo	2:58
4.	"Gimme That"	Im Sang-hyuk, Kim Tae-ho, Son Young-jin, Slrppy	Im Sang-hyuk, Son Young-jin	3:23
5.	"Domino"	Min Yeon-jae, Faces of Glory	Faces of Glory	3:27
Total length:				14:13

== Charts ==
=== Album ===
Chart	Peak position
Gaon Weekly album chart	2
Gaon Monthly album chart	8
Billboard World Albums Chart	13

=== Sales ===
Country	Sales amount
South Korea	15,620

== Release history ==
Country	Date	Format	Label
South Korea	April 26, 2013	CD, Digital download	Cube Entertainment
