= Act. 7 =

EP by 4Minute
- Released: February 1, 2016
- Genres: Pop; R&B
- Length: 17:59
- Labels: Cube; Universal Music

4Minute chronology
Crazy (2015)	Act. 7 (2016)

Singles from Act. 7
- 1. "Hate" Released: February 1, 2016; 2. "Canvas" Released: April 15, 2016

Act. 7 is the seventh and final extended play by South Korean girl group 4Minute. It was released on February 1, 2016, and consists of five songs. The lead track "Hate" was released in promotion. This is the last release from 4Minute prior to their disbandment announced in June 2016.

== Background ==
On January 25, Cube Entertainment released the track list and individual teaser images for the members. The first track, "Hate", was co-composed and arranged by EDM DJ Skrillex.

== Release and promotion ==
On January 29, the group released their first teaser video for "Hate" with a dramatic scene of each member. The music video for "Hate" was released on February 1, with the concept being a sexy take on a hip hop clip. The music video achieved 1 million views in under 24 hours of release, with some commentators attributing the high figure to anticipation for the group's comeback.

The group began promotion on MBC Music's Show Champion on February 3, then continued their first week of performances for the album on Mnet's M! Countdown, KBS's Music Bank, MBC's Music Core and SBS's Inkigayo on February 4, 5, 6 and 7 respectively.

On April 15, 2016, the group released a music video for the track "Canvas".

== Track listing ==
No.	Title	Lyrics	Music	Arrangement	Length
1.	"Hate" (싫어; Silheo)	Seo Jae-woo; Son Young-jin; Jenyer; Hyuna	Jae-woo; Young-jin; Skrillex	Jae-woo; Young-jin; Skrillex	3:35
2.	"No Love"	Ra-young, Gen Neo (of NoizeBank), Hyuna, Jenyer	Gen Neo (of NoizeBank)	Gen Neo (of NoizeBank)	3:14
3.	"Blind"	Kwon So-hyun; Jenyer; Hyuna	Im Kwang-wook; Ryan Kim; Hunnykilla; Amanda Moseley	Im Kwang-wook; Ryan Kim; Hunnykilla	3:59
4.	"Canvas"	Big Ssancho; Cho Seong-ho	Big Ssancho; Cho Seong-ho	Big Ssancho; Cho Seong-ho	3:35
5.	"Hate" (instrumental)		Jae-woo; Young-jin; Skrillex	Jae-woo; Young-jin; Skrillex	3:35
Total length:					17:59

== Charts ==
=== Weekly charts ===
Chart (2016)	Peak position
South Korean Albums (Gaon)	2
Japanese Albums (Oricon)	254
US World Albums (Billboard)	3

== Release history ==
Region	Date	Format	Label
Worldwide	February 1, 2016	Digital download	Cube Entertainment; Universal Music Group
