= Heo Ga-yoon =

South Korean actress and singer (born 1990)

- 허가윤
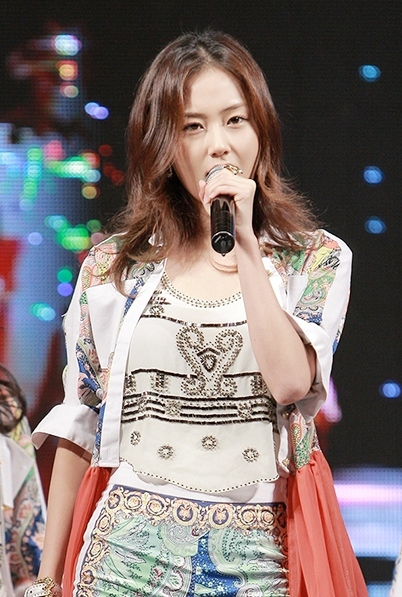
- Heo in September 2012
- Born: Heo Ga-yoon; May 18, 1990 (age 36); Goyang, South Korea
- Education: Dongguk University
- Occupations: Singer; actress
- Years active: 2011–present
- Agent: BS Company
- Musical career
- Genre: K-pop
- Instrument: Vocals
- Years active: 2009–2016
- Label: Cube
- Formerly of: 4Minute; 2Yoon; United Cube

Korean name
- Hangul: 허가윤
- Hanja: 許嘉允
- RR: Heo Gayun
- MR: Hŏ Kayun

Heo Ga-yoon (Korean: 허가윤; born May 18, 1990), better known by the mononym Gayoon, is a South Korean actress and singer. She is a former member of South Korean girl group 4Minute and its sub-group 2Yoon.

== Biography ==
=== Early life and education ===
Heo was born on May 18, 1990, in Goyang. She received second place at SM's 9th "Best Singer Contest" in 2005. She graduated from Dongduk Girl's High School. In 2008, Heo appeared in Mario's "I'm Yours" music video, with Seulong from 2AM.

In 2011, she enrolled into Dongguk University where she majored in film and theater. On September 17, 2014, Heo, along other stars, were appointed as ambassadors of Dongguk University. She graduated in 2016.

=== 2009–2012: 4Minute and solo activities ===
Heo was chosen as a member of 4Minute in 2009. The five-member girl group official debuted on June 18, 2009, performing their debut single, "Hot Issue", on Mnet's M! Countdown.

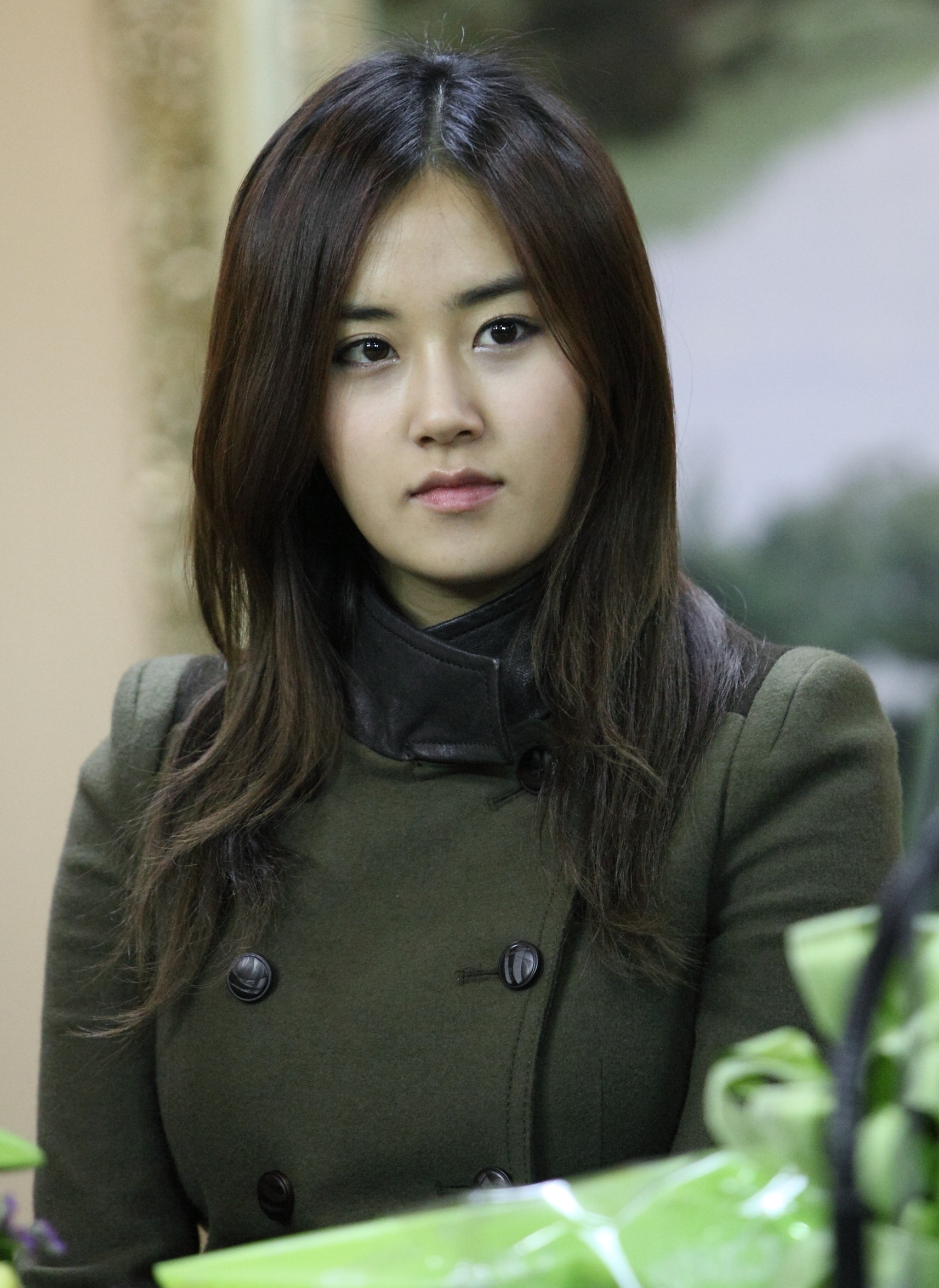
Heo in December 2010

On February 11, 2010, Heo was featured on the soundtrack for The Woman Who Still Wants to Marry, singing a duet with Han Ye-ji in the song "One Two Three". On September 3, 2010, Ga-yoon was a featured artist in Sunny Side's album, "Bad Guy Good Girl" with the song "Bad Guy Good Girl". In October 2010, Heo Ga-yoon was one of twenty idols from different South Korean groups that recorded the song, "Let's Go", for the purpose of increasing public participation in the 2010 G-20 Seoul summit. She provided vocals along with labelmates Yong Jun-hyung and G.NA.

Heo recorded "Wind Blow" for the soundtrack of MBC's My Princess; the song was released on January 5, 2011. She also recorded "Shameless Lie" for the soundtrack of SBS' Lie to Me, which was composed by Jadu and E-Tribe. The song was released on May 17, 2011. Heo made her acting debut on I'm a Flower Too with a cameo appearance as a high school student. On October 24, 2011 she released her OST song "I Think It Was a Dream" for KBS's Poseidon. Ga-yoon was also featured on Mario's song "Message" and promoted alongside him for that song.

In 2012, Ga-yoon played Hyun Kyung in MBC's drama Light and Shadow. In May 2012, Ga-yoon made an appearance along with group mate Hyuna on Top Gear Korea. Ga-yoon released a solo single on November 16, 2012. The song is called "My Love By My Side" and is a duet with BtoB's Ilhoon. On the October 21 episode of the live music show Inkigayo, Ga-yoon performed a new song for the SBS Gayo Daejeon music spectacular. As part of Mystic White, Ga-yoon released the charity song "Mermaid Princess" on December 26, 2012. The group would go on to perform the song in a one off performance during the year end SBS Gayo Daejeon show.

=== 2013–2016: Continuned solo activities and group disbandment ===
In 2014, HyunA, Ga-yoon, and Sohyun released the song "Only Gained Weight" for Brave Brothers' tenth anniversary album in January. In September, Gayoon became an MC for the third season of OnStyle's fashion program Style Log, together with Beast's Lee Gi-kwang and Do Sang Woo. The season premiered on September 12.

In 2015, Gayoon released an OST for SBS's Yong-pal called "Nightmare" together with Yong Jun-hyung on August 18. In November, it was revealed that Gayoon will make her big screen debut with the movie Father, Daughter. Gayoon, Jung So-min and Min Do-hee will be acting as daughters.

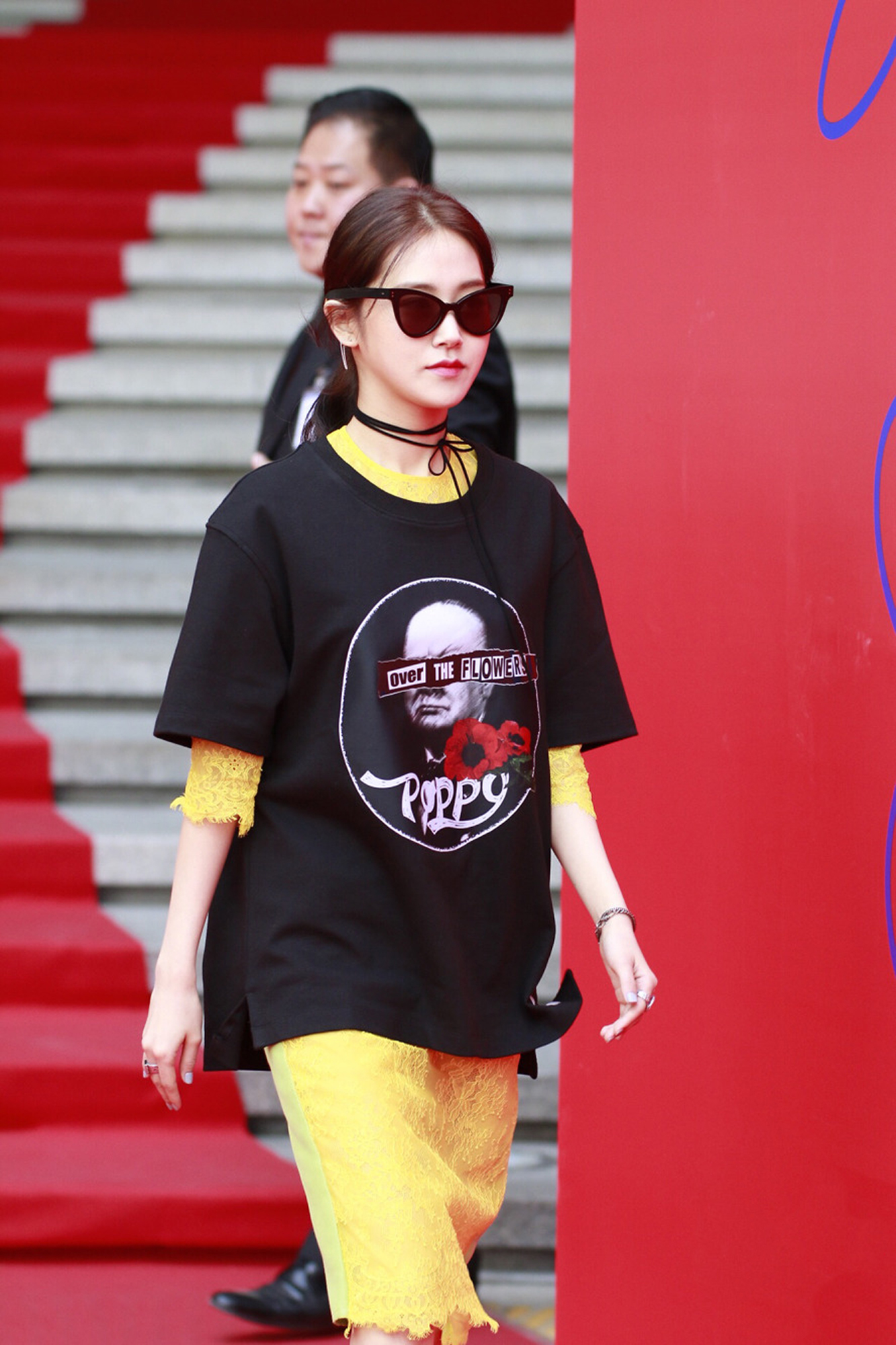
Heo at the Seoul Fashion Week in 2016

On June 13, 2016, Cube Entertainment announced that 4Minute decided to disband and the members were still in discussions on renewing their contracts. On June 15, Cube Entertainment officially announced that Jihyun, Gayoon, Jiyoon and Sohyun's contracts expired on June 14 and none of them had decided to renew with the company.

=== 2016–present: Acting career ===
On October 14, it was announced that Gayoon would be joining BS Company as an actress.

== Discography ==
=== Collaborative singles ===
List of collaborative singles, showing year released, selected chart positions, sales figures, and name of the album
Title	Year	Album
"What I Want to do Once I Have a Lover" (with Yoseob)	2009	Non-album single
"Heart Damage" (with Yong Jun-hyung)	2009	Non-album single
"Bad Guy Good Girl" (with Sunny Side)	2010	Non-album single
"Be Alright" (with Yoseob, G.NA and Lee Changseob)	2012	Road For Hope
"My Love By My Side" (with Jung Il-hoon)	2012	Non-album single
"Text Message" (with Mario)	2012	Non-album single
"Mermaid Princess" (with Mystic White)	2012	Non-album single
"Only Gained Weight" (with Hyuna and Sohyun)	2014	Brave Brothers' Anniversary Album
"Small Moon" (with Yoseob, Eunkwang, Shin Ji-hoon, and Ryu Hyunjin)	2014	Ryu-Cube Donation Project

=== Soundtrack appearances ===
List of soundtrack appearances, showing year released, selected chart positions, sales figures, and name of the album
Title	Year	Album
"One Two Three" (with Han Ye-ji)	2010	The Woman Who Still Wants to Marry OST
"Wind Blow"	2011	My Princess OST
"Shameless Lie"	2011	Lie To Me OST
"I Think It Was a Dream"	2011	Poseidon OST
"Wish" (with Yoseob)	2014	The Night Watchman's Journal OST
"Nightmare" (with Yong Jun-hyung)	2015	Yong-pal OST

== Filmography ==
=== Film ===
Year	Title	Role	Ref.
2016	Daddy You, Daughter Me	Kyung Mi	
2018	The Drug King	Jong-soon	
2020	Search Out	Noo-ri	
2022	Singer Song	Son Hye	

=== Television series ===
Year	Title	Role	Notes	Ref.
2011	Me Too, Flower!	High School Student	Cameo	
2012	Light and Shadow	Hyun Kyung		
2013	My Friend is Still Alive	Herself	Cameo	
2015	Let's Eat 2	Hong Min-a	Cameo	

=== Television show ===
Year	Title	Role	Ref.
2014	Off to School	Cast member	
2014	Style Log	Host	
