= 4Minute =

South Korean girl group

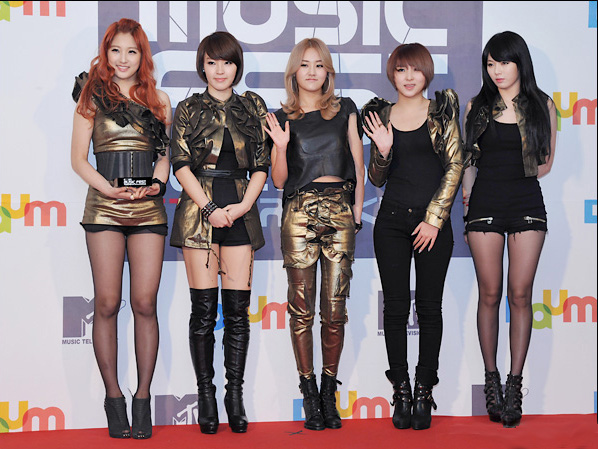
- 4Minute in 2011 (L–R: Jihyun, Jiyoon, Gayoon, Sohyun and Hyuna)

Background information
- Origin: Seoul, South Korea
- Genres: K-pop; dance-pop; R&B; hip hop
- Years active: 2009–2016
- Labels: Cube; Far Eastern Tribe; Universal Music
- Spinoffs: 2Yoon
- Past members: Jihyun; Gayoon; Jiyoon; Hyuna; Sohyun
- Website: 4min.co.kr

4Minute (Korean: 포미닛, often stylized in all caps) was a South Korean girl group formed by Cube Entertainment, consisting of members Jihyun, Gayoon, Jiyoon, Hyuna and Sohyun. The group was known for its edgy dance-pop style and "girl crush" image that attracted a large female fan base.

The group debuted in June 2009 with the single, "Hot Issue." They ultimately released one full-length Japanese album, Diamond (2010), one full-length Korean album, 4Minutes Left (2011), seven Korean extended plays, and multiple singles.

The group received several major awards, including the Rookie Award at the 2009 Golden Disc Awards, the K-pop New Artist Award at the 2010 Billboard Japan Music Awards, and the Bonsang Award at the 2011, 2012, and 2014 Seoul Music Awards. 4Minute disbanded in June 2016 after unsuccessful contract renewal negotiations between Cube Entertainment and the majority of the group members.

== History ==
=== 2009–2010: For Muzik, Hit Your Heart and Diamond ===
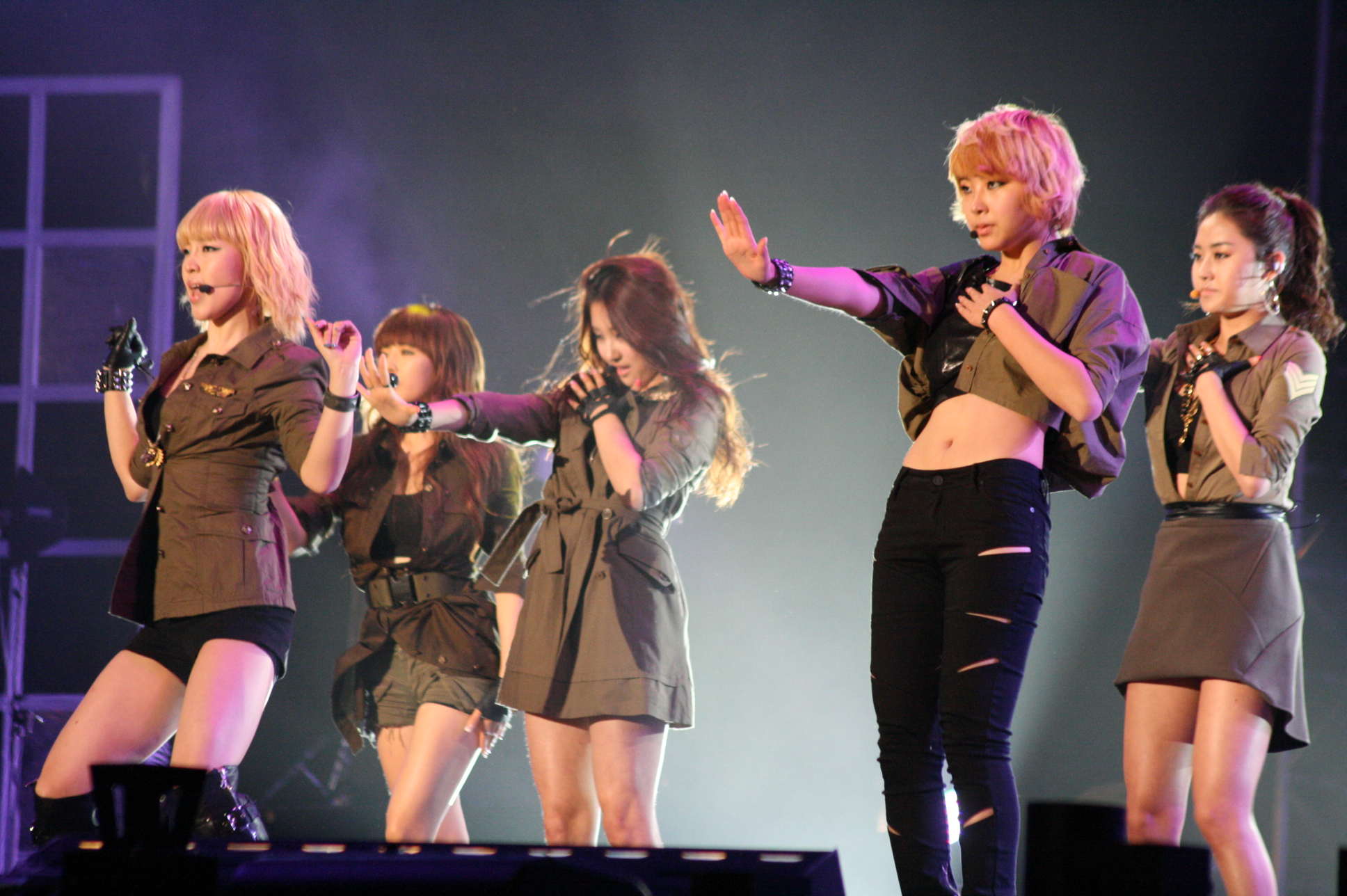
4Minute performing at the 2009 Asia Song Festival

On May 14, Cube Entertainment announced the formation of a five-member girl group, called 4Minute, and revealed that its first member would be former Wonder Girls member Kim Hyuna. Prior to the official announcement, the group was unofficially called the "Hyuna group". The next member, Nam Ji-hyun, was revealed on May 22. The remaining members were announced the following day. 4Minute released its first single, "Hot Issue", on June 15, and had their first television performance on MNet Countdown on June 18. On June 21, the group's van was raided by fans, who stole clothing and other items. Cube Entertainment said, "It was very unfortunate that such an ordeal occurred." On August 20, the group released its first mini-album called For Muzik along with its second single, "Muzik". The song won an Inkigayo Mutizen award. On August 27, South Korean radio and television network KBS banned the playing of "Won't Give You" (안줄래) for what they considered to be overly sexual lyrical content. The lyrics in question, in the style of a first-person narrative, express an unwillingness on the part of the subject to "give" herself or her heart to her partner. Cube Entertainment responded to the ban by stating that the song was intended to be "about the pure feelings of a girl to a guy" and that they were very disappointed by the decision. On October 15, the single "What a Girl Wants" was released. On December 2, 4Minute, with Korean singers Mario and Amen, released the Christmas song "Jingle Jingle". The group recorded a remix with American artist Amerie for her song "Heard 'em All" which was part of the Asian version of her fourth album. The song featured Korean rapper Yong Jun-hyung of label mate Beast.

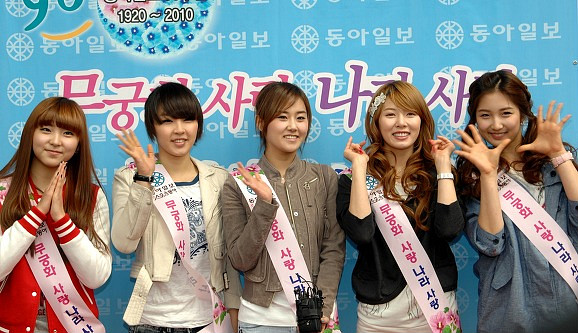
4Minute in April 2010

On January 5, 2010, it was announced that the Universal Music Group would be assisting 4Minute with an international launch of its album. The group toured Taiwan, Philippines, Thailand, and Hong Kong. On May 5, the group debuted "Muzik" as a Japanese single, and on May 8, held its first concert in Japan. The single reached number 21 on the Oricon weekly singles chart. On May 19, 4Minute released a mini-album entitled Hit Your Heart, and its title track "HuH". The single featured fellow label mates Beast, who rapped during song "Who's Next?." "HuH" peaked at number 3 on the Gaon Singles Chart. On May 24, South Korean FM station "Voice of Freedom" included the "Huh" song in its propaganda broadcasts to North Korea. On July 5, the group released the music video for "I My Me Mine", which was the second single from Hit Your Heart. On July 19, the song "Superstar" was digitally released for the Korean TV show Superstar K2. The group performed for Celebration at Marina, one of the line-up activities for the Singapore Youth Olympic Games 2010. On July 30, the Japanese version of "I My Me Mine" was released. On October 12, the third Japanese single. In December, 4Minute held Japanese concerts 4Minute Energy Live Volume 2: Diamond in Tokyo and Osaka. Its Japanese album Diamond was released on December 15 and debuted at the number 18 on the Oricon chart.

=== 2011–2012: 4Minutes Left, Volume Up and "Love Tension" ===
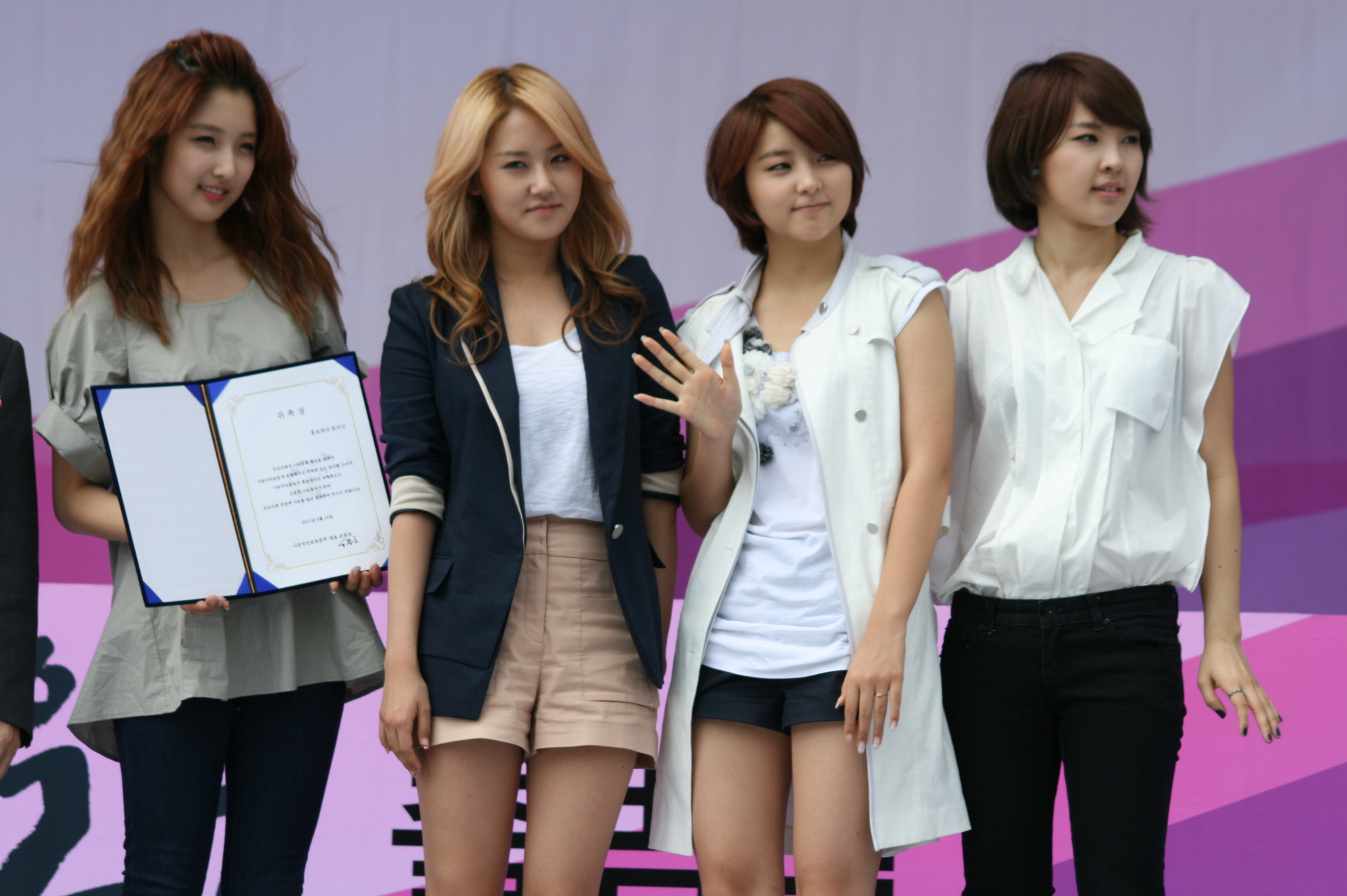
4Minute at the DiGi Live K-Pop Party on January 13, 2011.

On January 13, 2011, the group performed at the DiGi Live K-Pop Party 2011 in Malaysia at Stadium Negara with Beast and G.NA. On January 20, the group received a Bonsang Award at the 20th Seoul Music Awards. In February 2011, the group received the Kpop New Artist Award for 2010 at the Billboard Japan Music Awards. On February 23, the group modeled for bridal designer Yumi Katsura at her 2011 Paris Grand Collection Tokyo Fashion Show held in Tokyo's Ryōgoku Kokugikan, where the group performed songs "Muzik" and "Why". On March 12, the group performed at the 50th Anniversary Music Wave Concert in Thailand. Its fourth Japanese single, "Why" was released as the theme song to the TV Asahi drama, Akutō: Jūhanzai Sōsahan.The music video was released in February, followed by a single release on March 9. "Heart to Heart" was released as a music video on March 29, and starred CN Blue's Jungshin. On March 29, the digital-only mini-album Heart to Heart was released. On April 5, 4Minute released the Korean album, 4Minutes Left. The music video for "Mirror Mirror" was released on the same day. The album includes "Mirror Mirror", and songs from Heart to Heart and Diamond. (Note: Because the Heart to Heart tracks were put on the release of the full album 4minutes Left a week later, Heart to Heart is not counted as a mini-album, Cube Entertainment instead labeled Volume Up to be the group's third mini-album, and Name is 4Minute to be the fourth mini-album. Sources: Benjamin, Jeff (April 18, 2013). "4minute Announces 4th Mini-Album With Electric Concept Photos". Billboard. Archived from the original on August 30, 2014.) Because of the song's provocative spread leg choreography; music producers demanded that "Mirror Mirror" be changed or the group could not perform the song on their shows. As a response, 4Minute changed the song's choreography, starting with the performance on M! Countdown on April 14. The song reached number two on the Gaon Chart. 4Minute collaborated with Japanese singer Thelma Aoyama for her single, "Without U", which has both Japanese and English versions. Hyuna was featured in SS501's Heo Young-saeng's title track from his first solo mini album, Let It Go. On July 5, Hyuna released a solo mini album, Bubble Pop! and the music video for the title track, Bubble Pop. Although the performances for Bubble Pop the song was concluded prematurely due to Korea Communications Commission review committee, the music video was a viral hit, gaining 10 million views on YouTube as of August 2011. On August 3, the music video Freestyle was released as an endorsement track for the video game company JCE. On August 15, 4Minute posted the music video for the Japanese version "Heart to Heart". On September 7, the group released "Heart to Heart" as its fifth Japanese single, which ranked 15 on Oricon Daily Singles chart. The group also released its first DVD, Emerald of 4 Minute, which ranked second on the Oricon Daily DVD Chart. In October, the TV Tokyo drama "Welcome to the El-Palacio" featured 4Minute's newest song, "Ready Go", as its opener. On December 6, "Ready Go" was later released as the sixth Japanese single.

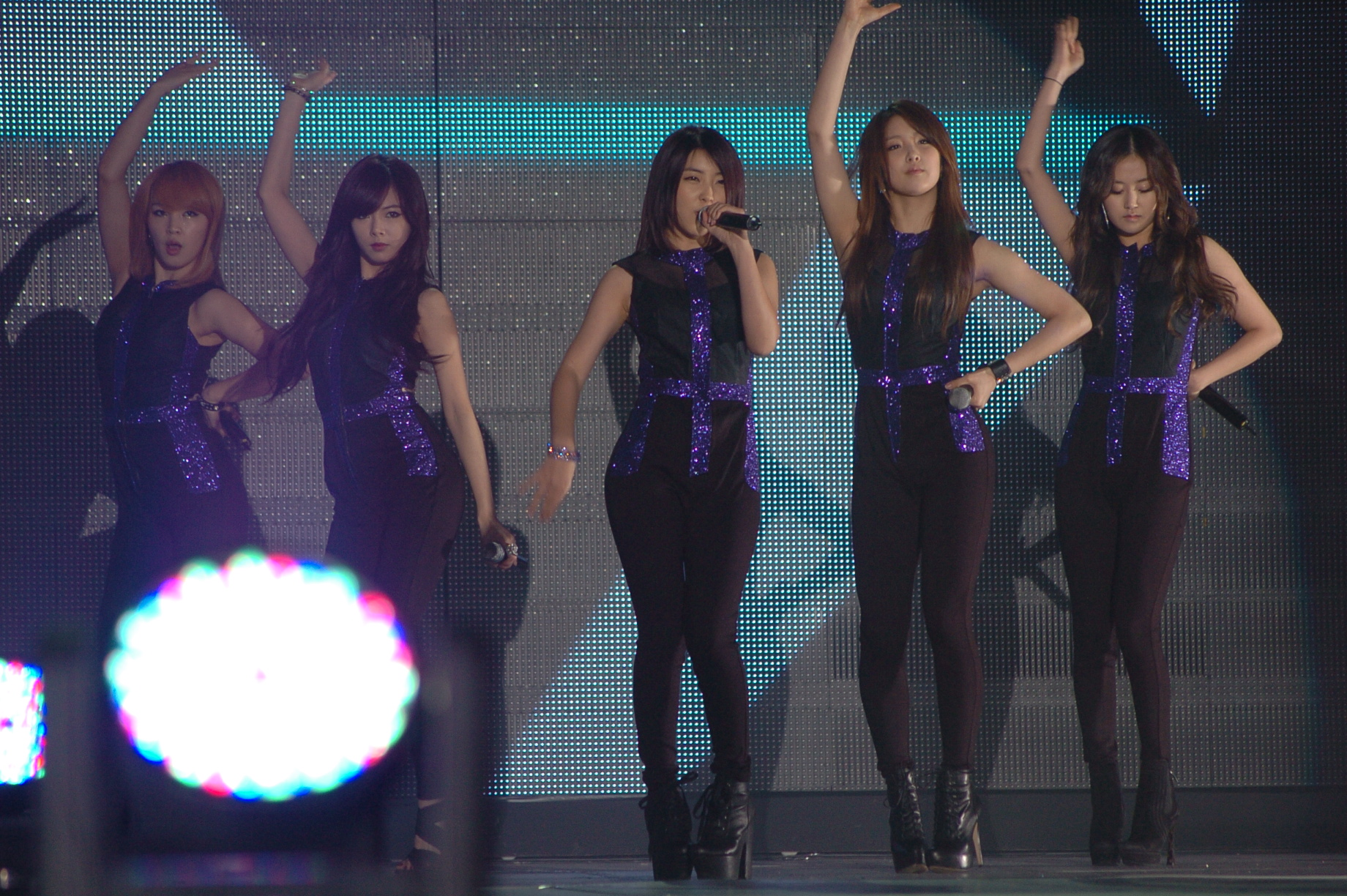
4Minute appearing on stage in March 2012

On April 9, 2012, 4Minute released the mini-album Volume Up along with the title track "Volume Up" and its music video. The single "Volume Up" reached number one on M! Countdown. On August 22, 4Minute released its seventh Japanese single "Love Tension", which featured a Japanese version of "Volume Up". On October 13, 4Minute performed at KCON 2012 at the Verizon Wireless Amphitheatre in Irvine, California. On December 4, 4Minute released the song "Welcome to The School" for the KBS TV series School 2013.

=== 2013–2014: Name Is 4Minute, Is It Poppin'? and 4Minute World ===
From January 26 to February 21, 4Minute participated in the 2013 United Cube Concert tour at venues in China, Korea and Japan. On April 26, 4Minute released the fourth mini-album Name Is 4Minute and the single "What's Your Name?", which was produced by Brave Brothers. Promotion for the single and album involved a set of teaser images where the members were decorated in fantasy-inspired sets and neon tones. In the fourth week of May, the song reached number one on the Gaon Single Chart, making it the group's first chart topper for Gaon. On the edition of June 1, the single reached number one on the Billboard K-pop Hot 100. On June 28, 4Minute released the summer single "Is It Poppin'?", also written and produced by Brave Brothers. In an interview with Newsen, a Cube Entertainment spokesperson said that the song was "neither a sexy or charismatic concept, but a cute concept – a hip hop dance song that goes well with the summer feel." Its Korean title "물 좋아?" (romanized: Mul Joha?, lit. "How's the Water?"), is a slang phrase that men use to ask if the girls in a club are hot. KBS announced that the lyrics for "Is It Poppin?" were unqualified for broadcast because they contained the English word "ass". 4Minute planned to remove the word from the video for re-evaluation. Billboard K-Town columnist Jeff Benjamin tweeted whether the Brave Brothers' new thing was to sample old-school-sounding R&B. Benjamin also noted that similarly to "What's Your Name," "Brave Brothers uses a similar formula for 4minute's new track, but it all feels smoother." He explains the track "uses subdued snares, a twinkling Ellie Goulding "Lights"-esque sample and a soft, recurring vocal sample. Despite sounding busy on paper, the song flows nicely together as a sweet little blend of R&B and electro-pop." The song peaked at number 9 on the Gaon Digital Chart and number 6 on the Billboard K-Pop Hot 100, selling 606,713 digital downloads. In September, 4Minute finished its contract with Universal Music Japan, and shut down the group's Japanese official website as well as its fanclub site, 4Nia Japan.

On January 20, 2014, Brave Brothers released the single "Only Gained Weight" which featured 4Minute members Hyuna, Gayoon and Sohyun; the song reached number five on the Melon chart and Gaon. The group's fifth mini-album, 4Minute World, along with its featured track "Whatcha Doin' Today?", was released on March 17. The group promoted the song on various Korean music shows along with the track "Wait A Minute". The shows included KBS's Music Bank, MBC's Show! Music Core, SBS's Inkigayo and Mnet's M! Countdown from March 20–23. The single became the group's first single to debut at number 1 in Korea. On March 30, 4Minute won against 2NE1 and Girls' Generation on Inkigayo. And on April 3, they also won on M! Countdown which took place at Japan. On June 7, 4Minute performed "Whatcha Doin' Today" on Dream Concert along with other Kpop idols including their labelmates Beast, Apink and BTOB. On October 17, during a performance at a local festival in Seongnam, south of Seoul in South Korea, at least 16 people were killed and 11 injured in an accident where a ventilation grate that people were standing on collapsed. On October 28, 4Minute was chosen as one of the 10 winners of "Style Icon Awards" for their trendy, stylish, and influential fashion, and also performed at the awards show.

=== 2015–2016: Crazy, Act. 7 and disbandment ===
On January 26, 2015, Cube Entertainment revealed that 4Minute would pre-release a track from their next mini-album titled "Cold Rain", marking the first time the group has released a ballad as a single. On February 9, 4Minute released their sixth EP Crazy, along with the title track's music video. Their EP debuted at number 1 on Billboard's World Albums Chart. On April 4, 4Minute held a solo concert 4Minute Fan Bash in Myanmar, with around 7,000 fans in attendance.

On January 20, 2016, it was announced that the group would release their seventh mini album Act. 7 on February 1. 4Minute collaborated with American producer Skrillex on the lead single, "Hate". On June 13, it was announced that the group would disband following their contract expiration, with only Hyuna renewing her contract with the management agency. A Cube Entertainment representative stated, "As the contract end date approaches, the members have been in discussions for renewal, but while the agency tried to persuade half of them to continue the group, it ended up accepting the decision by the four members that they will not continue as a group." The representative added, "Due to the different opinion of the members, for all intents and purposes, the group will disband."

== Subgroups ==
Plans for the sub-unit 2Yoon (composing of Gayoon and Jiyoon) were announced in late 2012. On January 17, 2013, 2YOON released the album, Harvest Moon, along with the music video for its lead single, "24/7". 2YOON held their debut stage on January 17 at M! Countdown.

== Discography ==
- Diamond (2010)
- 4Minutes Left (2011)

== Filmography ==
=== Shows and documentaries ===
A list of variety shows and documentaries that stars 4Minute.

Year	Show	Network	Notes	Ref
2009	MTV 4minute	MTV	Documentary series	
2010	4minute's Friend Day	MTV	The group makes friends with ordinary people.	
2010	4minute's All In	SBS		
2010	ASAP XV	ABS-CBN	First Guesting in Philippine variety show	
2010	Wowowee	ABS-CBN	Second Guesting in Philippine variety show	
2011	4Minute's Mr. Teacher	E-Channel	Celebrity guests teach the group how to become international pop stars.	
2011	4Minute @ Shikshin Road			
2011	Exciting Cube TV	Mnet	With Beast, G.NA and other members of Cube Entertainment	
2012	4Minute's Travel Maker	QTV Korea	Travel documentary series.	
2015	4Minute's Video	K-Star	Reality show	
2015	Cube TV	IHQ	With other members of Cube Entertainment	

== Concerts ==
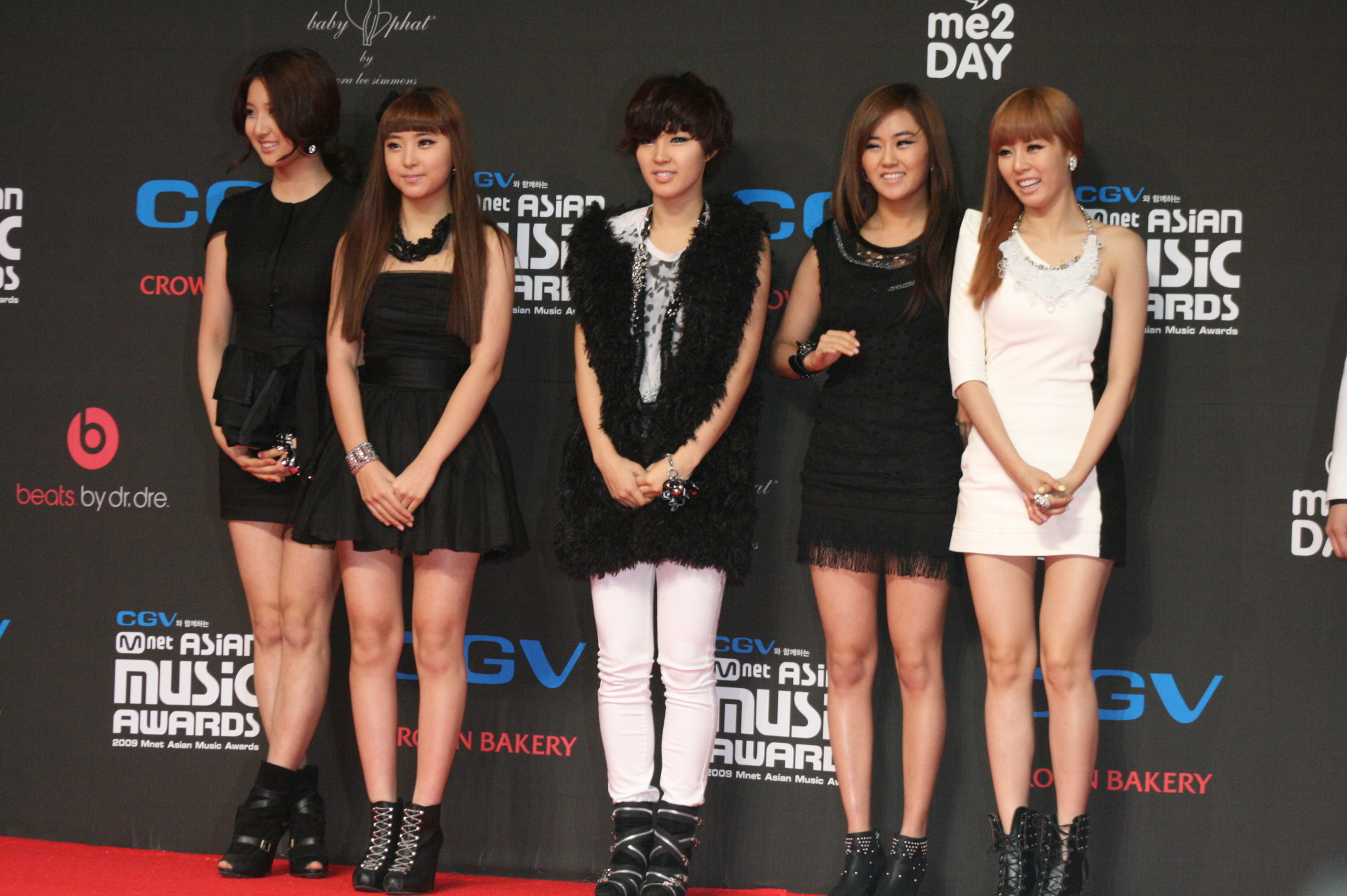
4Minute at the 2009 Mnet Asian Music Awards

- 4Minute Energy LIVE Volume 1: 1st Concert (Tokyo) (2010)
- 4Minute Live in Manila (2010)
- 4Minute Energy LIVE Volume 2: DIAMOND (Tokyo & Osaka) (2010)
- 4Minute Volume Up Party (2013)
- 4Minute Like Water Concert (Seoul) (2013)
- 4Minute LIVE PARTY ROCK Concert (Sydney) (2013)
- 4Minute solo Concert Fan Bash in Europe (Barcelona, Stockholm) (2014)
- 4Minute solo Concert Fan Bash (Myanmar) (2015)
- 4Minute Solo Concert Fan Bash Tour In Latin America (Argentina) (2015)

== Awards and nominations ==
Name of the award ceremony, year presented, category, nominee of the award, and the result of the nomination
Award ceremony	Year	Category	Nominee / Work	Result	Ref.
Asia Model Awards	2010	BBF Popular Singer Award — Female Group	4Minute	Won	
Asia Song Festival	2010	Asian Influencer Artist Award	4Minute	Won	
Billboard Japan Music Awards	2010	K-pop New Artist Award	4Minute	Won	
Cyworld Digital Music Awards	2009	Rookie of the Month – June	"Hot Issue"	Won	
Golden Disc Awards	2009	Rookie of the Year	4Minute	Won	
Golden Disc Awards	2009	Digital Song Bonsang	"Hot Issue"	Nominated	
Golden Disc Awards	2012	Digital Song Bonsang	"Mirror Mirror"	Won	
Golden Disc Awards	2012	Digital Daesang	"Mirror Mirror"	Nominated	
Golden Disc Awards	2012	Album Bonsang	4Minutes Left	Nominated	
Golden Disc Awards	2013	Album Bonsang	Volume Up	Won	
Golden Disc Awards	2013	Album Daesang	Volume Up	Nominated	
Golden Disc Awards	2014	Digital Song Bonsang	"What's Your Name"	Won	
Golden Disc Awards	2014	Digital Daesang	"What's Your Name"	Nominated	
Golden Disc Awards	2015	Best Dance Performance	"Whatcha Doin' Today"	Nominated	
Golden Disc Awards	2016	Album Bonsang	Crazy	Nominated	
Golden Disc Awards	2016	Popularity Award	4Minute	Nominated	
Golden Disc Awards	2016	Global Popularity Award	4Minute	Nominated	
Gaon Chart Music Awards	2013	Song of the Year – May	"What's Your Name"	Won	
Gaon Chart Music Awards	2016	Popular Singer of the Year	4Minute	Nominated	
KOCCA Rookie Music Awards	2009	Rookie of the Month	"Hot Issue"	Won	
Korean Culture and Entertainment Awards	2015	Top 10 Singer Award	4Minute	Won	
Korean Entertainment Arts Awards	2009	Best New Artist Award	4Minute	Won	
Korea Lifestyle Awards	2015	Best Performance of the Year Award	4Minute	Won	
Korea SNS Industry Awards	2016	Grand Prize	4Minute	Won	
Melon Music Awards	2009	Best New Artist	4Minute	Nominated	
Mnet 20's Choice Awards	2010	20's Most Influential Stars	4Minute	Won	
Mnet Asian Music Awards	2009	Best New Female Artist	"Hot Issue"	Nominated	
Mnet Asian Music Awards	2009	Best House & Electronic Song	"Muzik"	Nominated	
Mnet Asian Music Awards	2010	Best Dance Performance – Female Group	"HuH"	Nominated	
Mnet Asian Music Awards	2010	Best Female Group	4Minute	Nominated	
Mnet Asian Music Awards	2011	Best Dance Performance – Female Group	"Mirror Mirror"	Nominated	
Mnet Asian Music Awards	2012	Best Dance Performance – Female Group	"Volume Up"	Nominated	
Mnet Asian Music Awards	2013	Best Female Group	4Minute	Nominated	
Mnet Asian Music Awards	2014	Best Dance Performance – Female Group	"Whatcha Doin' Today"	Nominated	
Mnet Asian Music Awards	2015	Best Dance Performance – Female Group	"Crazy"	Nominated	
RTHK International Pop Poll Awards	2010	Top New Act	4Minute	Bronze	
Seoul Music Awards	2011	Bonsang (Main Prize)	4Minute	Won	
Seoul Music Awards	2012	Bonsang (Main Prize)	4Minute	Won	
Seoul Music Awards	2014	Bonsang (Main Prize)	4Minute	Won	
Style Icon Awards	2014	Top 10 Style Icons	4Minute	Won	
