= Volume Up (EP) =

- Physical edition cover

EP by 4Minute
- Released: April 9, 2012
- Genres: K-pop; electropop; dance-pop
- Length: 22:32
- Labels: Cube; Universal Music

4Minute chronology
4Minutes Left (2011)	Volume Up (2012)	Best of 4Minute (2012)

Singles from Volume Up
- 1. "Volume Up" Released: April 9, 2012

Volume Up is the third extended play by South Korean girl group 4Minute. It was released by Cube Entertainment and distributed by Universal Music on April 9, 2012.

== Release ==
4Minute originally scheduled their EP release for February 2012, but this date was subsequently delayed several times. Volume Up was finally released on April 9, 2012. The premiere of the music video for the title song took place on the same day.

== Promotion ==
The group promoted the title track "Volume Up" (as well as the track "Dream Racer") on several music shows. Between April 12 and 15, 2012, they appeared onstage at music shows, including Mnet's M! Countdown, KBS's Music Bank, MBC's Show! Music Core and SBS's Inkigayo.

== Music video ==
The video features a gothic set reminiscent of a Dark-Age castle. It consists of several tightly-edited shots of the group, sometimes with dancers and sometimes with animals in the background, combined with shots of the ominous-looking interior architecture. This music video was released on April 9, 2012.

== Commercial performance ==
Volume Up debuted at number 7 on the Gaon Album Chart for the week ending April 14, 2012. In its third week, the EP peaked at number 1. It was the fourth best-selling album in April 2012 with 42,060 copies sold. The album sold 56,174 copies in 2012.

== Accolades ==
Music program awards for "Volume Up"
Program	Date
Show Champion	April 17, 2012
Show Champion	April 24, 2012
M Countdown	May 3, 2012

== Track listing ==
No.	Title	Lyrics	Music	Length
1.	"Get on the Floor"	Kim Dong-yeol, Im Sang-hyuk	Kim Dong-yeol, Im Sang-hyuk	1:45
2.	"Volume Up"	Shinsadong Tiger, Rado	Shinsadong Tiger, Rado	3:50
3.	"I'm OK"	Rado	Rado	3:26
4.	"Say My Name"	Seo Yong-bae, Seo Jae-woo	Seo Yong-bae, Seo Jae-woo	3:16
5.	"Femme Fatale"	M (Lee Min-woo), David Kim (Day Day)	Kim Do-hyun	3:29
6.	"Dream Racer"	THE KOXX	THE KOXX	3:31
7.	"Black Cat"	Chang Jun-ho, Min Yeon-jae, Gong Hyun-sik	Chang Jun-ho, Gong Hyun-sik	3:15

== Charts ==
Chart (2012)	Peak position
South Korean Albums (Gaon)	1

== Release history ==
Country	Date	Format	Label
South Korea	April 9, 2012	CD, Digital download	Cube Entertainment
