= Diamond (4Minute album) =

- Digital artwork

Studio album by 4Minute
- Released: December 15, 2010
- Genres: J-pop; electropop; dance-pop
- Length: 42:57
- Label: Far Eastern Tribe
- Producer: Park Jin-young

4Minute chronology
Hit Your Heart (2010)	Diamond (2010)	4Minutes Left (2011)

Singles from Diamond
- 1. "Muzik" Released: May 5, 2010; 2. "I My Me Mine" Released: July 28, 2010; 3. "First/Dreams Come True" Released: October 27, 2010

Diamond is the debut Japanese studio album by South Korean girl group 4Minute. It was released in Japan on December 15, 2010 in two editions: CD only and limited edition CD+DVD. The limited edition includes a 52-page photo book that highlights some of the group's single releases and Japanese debuts. The album peaked at number 27 on Japan's weekly Oricon Albums Chart and sold over 12,000 copies.

== Singles ==
A Japanese version of the song "Muzik" was released on May 5, 2010 as the first single for Diamond. 4Minute previously released the song in Korean in 2009. The Japanese version reached number 21 on the Oricon Singles Chart, selling 8,234 copies. It also charted at number 36 on the international sub-chart of South Korea's Gaon Digital Chart.

On July 28, 2010, 4Minute released the album's second single, a Japanese version of the group's 2010 single "I My Me Mine". It reached number 26 on the Oricon Singles Chart. The single sold 4,742 copies the first week, selling over 10,945 copies in total. The single also charted in South Korea at number 47 on the international Gaon Digital Chart.

The third and last single from the album is "First", which was released on October 27, 2010 as a double A-side with the non-album track "Dreams Comes True." "First/Dreams Come True" reached number 28 on the Oricon Singles Chart, while "First" charted at number 9 on the international Gaon Digital Chart in South Korea.

== Track listing ==
Lyrics credits feature both the Japanese and the original version where appropriate. They also include "rap making". Music credits feature the composers and arrangers.

CD Tracklist
No.	Title	Lyrics	Music	Length
1.	"For Muzik"	Sung-in Hwang, Mario, Ji-yoon Jeon	Sang-ho Lee, Shinsadong Tiger	1:24
2.	"Muzik" (Japanese Version)	Shoko Fujibayashi, Sang-ho Lee, S. Tiger	Sang-ho Lee, S. Tiger, Jun-hyung Jong	3:43
3.	"Bababa"	Ji-won Kang, Ki-bum Kim	Ji-won Kang, Ki-bum Kim	3:24
4.	"Hot Issue"	S. Tiger, Hey.J	S. Tiger, Chae-kyu Lee	3:28
5.	"Hide & Seek"	S. Tiger, Kyu-sung Choi	S. Tiger, Kyu-sung Choi	3:26
6.	"Who's Next?" (feat. Beast)	S. Tiger	S. Tiger	1:57
7.	"Huh"	S. Tiger, Jun-hyung Yong	S. Tiger, Jun-hyung Yong	3:48
8.	"Can't Make Up My Mind" (sung in Japanese)	Hooks	Jeff Miyahara	3:42
9.	"What a Girl Wants"	Sung-jin Hwang	Sang-ho Lee, S. Tiger	3:25
10.	"First" (sung in Japanese)	Kanata Okajima, S. Tiger, Hey.J, Eddie	S. Tiger, Hey.J	3:31
11.	"I My Me Mine" (Japanese Version)	Michiko Motohashi, Sang-ho Lee, S. Tiger	Sang-ho Lee, S. Tiger	3:24
12.	"Already Gone"	Sang-hyuck Im, Da9297	Sang-hyuck Im, Da9297	3:33
13.	"December" (sung in Japanese)	Nao	Nao	3:58
Total length:				42:36

Korean edition
No.	Title	Length
1.	"Muzik" (Japanese Version)	3:43
2.	"Bababa"	3:24
3.	"Hide & Seek"	3:26
4.	"Who's Next? (featuring Beast)"	1:57
5.	"Huh"	3:48
6.	"Can't Make Up My Mind"	3:42
7.	"First"	3:31
8.	"I My Me Mine" (Japanese Version)	3:24
9.	"Already Gone"	3:33
10.	"December"	3:58
Total length:		34:21

DVD - Music Videos
No.	Title	Length
1.	"Muzik" (Japanese Version)
2.	"I My Me Mine" (Japanese Version)
3.	"HUH"
4.	"FIRST"

== Charts ==
Chart (2010–2011)	Peak position
Japanese Albums (Oricon)	27
South Korean Albums (Gaon)	10

== Release history ==
Country	Date	Format	Label
Japan	December 15, 2010	Digital download, CD	Far Eastern Tribe Records
South Korea	January 25, 2011	Digital download, CD	Cube Entertainment
