= 4Minutes Left =

Studio album by 4Minute
- Released: April 5, 2011
- Genres: K-pop; electropop; dance-pop
- Length: 33:52
- Labels: Cube; Universal Music

4Minute chronology
Diamond (2010)	4Minutes Left (2011)	Volume Up (2012)

Singles from 4Minutes Left
- 1. "Heart to Heart" Released: March 29, 2011; 2. "Mirror Mirror" Released: April 5, 2011

4Minutes Left is the debut Korean studio album (second and final overall) by South Korean girl group 4Minute. It was released in Korea on April 5, 2011. It contains songs from the maxi-single Heart to Heart and songs from the group's first Japanese album Diamond. It also has a Korean rendition of "First", a new edition of the song "Hide & Seek" and 2 new songs: "Mirror Mirror" and "Badly".

== Release ==
=== "Heart to Heart" maxi-single ===
A digital maxi-single was released with the title track "Heart to Heart" on March 29, 2011. Other tracks included were an intro ("4Minutes Left"), "Sweet Suga Honey!", "You Know", and "모르는 척" ("Pretend"; Moreuneun Cheog), all of which were later included on the full-length 4Minutes Left album.

The music video for "Heart to Heart" was released on March 28, 2011, and features CN Blue's member Lee Jung-shin. The video starts with member Hyuna and her boyfriend (Jung-shin) sitting on a couch and talking; she notices how much he has changed, but he stands up and walks off. Soon afterwards, she and the other 4Minute members are at a club when she notices her boyfriend is talking with another woman. She and 4Minute then plan all sorts of mischief for revenge including spraying his sandwich, replacing his toothpaste and shaving cream with other creams, delivering inappropriate items to his workplace, making his car not start, dropping a large fake spider while he is sitting on the couch, and getting him arrested using edited photos. At the end of the video, she is talking with him again.

"Heart to Heart" peaked at number 5 on the Gaon Digital Chart's weekly charts and finished 2011 at number 47 on the yearly chart.

=== 4Minutes Left and "Mirror Mirror" ===
The full-length album 4Minutes Left was released on April 5, 2011 in CD and digital formats. It included all songs from the "Heart to Heart" digital maxi-single as well as five new tracks. It reached number 2 on the Gaon Album Chart and sold 38,678 copies. The album was also released in the Philippines and Brazil.

A music video for the promotional single "Mirror Mirror" was released the same day. The video starts with a mirror breaking. The girls in the first part of the song, sings in a black and white background with geometrical shapes. By the second chorus the girls then are seen in a street with lights and an orange sky serving as backgrounds. By the final part of the song, they are seen in both of the previous concepts. Throughout the song the girls are also seen in a room with mirror serving as walls, however the girls are also seen alone in the rooms.

"Mirror Mirror" peaked at number 2 on the weekly Gaon Digital Chart and landed at number 29 for the year-end chart. There was controversy surrounding the dance used as part of the song's television stage performances. During the second chorus, 4minute performed a "spread leg dance". Many viewers found the move provocative and too overtly sexual for television. 4minute was not alone in the controversy, as another group, Rania, also received the same complaints because of a similar dance move. The "spread leg dance" was later banned by KBS from their show Music Bank, and by SBS from their show Inkigayo. Due to this problem, 4minute changed their choreography twice.

== Track listing ==
No.	Title	Lyrics	Music	Length
1.	"4Minutes Left" (Intro)	Shinsadong Tiger, Im Sang-hyuk, Choi Kyu-sung	Shinsadong Tiger, Im Sang-hyuk, Choi Kyu-sung	1:17
2.	"Mirror Mirror" (거울아 거울아; Geoura Geoura)	Shinsadong Tiger, blue Magic	Shinsadong Tiger, blue Magic	3:35
3.	"Heart to Heart"	Shinsadong Tiger, Choi Kyu-sung	Shinsadong Tiger, Choi Kyu-sung	3:49
4.	"Sweet Suga Honey!"	Jang Jun-ho	Jang Jun-ho, Gong Hyun-sik, Sugar Flow	3:25
5.	"Pretend" (모르는 척; Moreuneun Cheok)	Choi Kyu-sung	Choi Kyu-sung	3:52
6.	"You Know"	Im Sang-hyuk, Da9297	Im Sang-hyuk, Lee Sang-ho, Da9297	3:54
7.	"Already Gone"	Im Sang-hyuk, Da9297	Im Sang-hyuk, Da9297	3:32
8.	"First" (Korean version)	Shinsadong Tiger, Jeon He-won	Shinsadong Tiger, Jeon He-won	3:30
9.	"Hide & Seek"	Shinsadong Tiger, Choi Kyu-sung	Shinsadong Tiger, Choi Kyu-sung	3:26
10.	"Badly" (나쁘게; Nappeuge)	Im Sang-hyuk	Im Sang-hyuk, Da9297	3:32
Total length:				33:51

== Charts ==
=== Album ===
Chart	Peak position
Gaon Weekly album chart	2
Gaon Monthly album chart	5
Gaon Yearly album chart	41

=== Sales and certifications ===
Chart (2011)	Amount
Gaon physical sales	37,727

== Release history ==
Country	Date	Format	Label
South Korea	April 5, 2011	CD, digital download	Cube Entertainment
Philippines	July 16, 2011	CD	MCA Music
Brazil	January 18, 2012	CD	Universal Music Group
