= For Muzik =

EP by 4Minute
- Released: August 31, 2009
- Recorded: 2009
- Genres: K-pop; electropop; dance-pop
- Length: 22:11
- Labels: Cube; Mnet Media

4Minute chronology
For Muzik (2009)	Hit Your Heart (2010)

Singles from For Muzik
- 1. "Hot Issue" Released: June 15, 2009; 2. "Muzik" Released: August 31, 2009; 3. "What a Girl Wants" Released: October 28, 2009

For Muzik is the debut extended play by South Korean girl group 4Minute. It features their debut single "Hot Issue". The title track "Muzik" was used to promote the EP, as well as "What a Girl Wants" later that year.

== Release ==
After the release of their debut single, "Hot Issue", the group started recording their first album, including a remix of "Hot Issue" done by Shinsadong Tiger. The album was released digitally on August 28, 2009. "Hot Issue" charted at number 20 while "Muzik" charted at number 21 on the year-end Melon chart for 2009. Hot Issue was re-released in higher quality on 1thek on January 22, 2019.

== Promotion ==
The group promoted the album by performing "Hot Issue", "Muzik" and "What a Girl Wants" on various TV shows. These included Mnet's M! Countdown, KBS's Music Bank, MBC's Show! Music Core and SBS's Inkigayo. Promotions lasted from June until the end of December 2009. The album was also promoted in Japan, where a repackaged version of the album was released.

On September 1, 2009, the music video for "Muzik" was released. It with the intro track "For Muzik", followed by a scene showing the group dancing in a room with flashing lights. There are individual inter-scenes of single members wearing latex leggings and dancing to the song.

== Controversy ==
On August 31, 2009, Korean broadcaster KBS banned the playing of the song "Won't Give You" because of inappropriate lyrics, specifically the following line that roughly translates to "Starting from today, I won't give myself to you. Now, I will never give you my entire heart. Now, I won't ever give myself to you." In response, Cube Entertainment stated, "The lyrics for "Won't Give You" is about the pure feelings of a girl to a guy. We are very disappointed that the lyrics were deemed inappropriate."

== Track listing ==
No.	Title	Lyrics	Music	Length
1.	"For Muzik (Intro)"	Jeon Ji Yoon, Mario	Lee Sang-ho	1:24
2.	"Muzik"	Lee Sang-ho, Shinsadong Tiger	Lee Sang-ho, Shinsadong Tiger	3:43
3.	"Hot Issue"	Shinsadong Tiger, Jeon Hye-won	Shinsadong Tiger, Lee Chae-kyu	3:28
4.	"What a Girl Wants"	Hwang Sung-jin	Lee Sang-ho, Shinsadong Tiger	3:25
5.	"Funny" (웃겨; Utgyeo)	Kim Do-hoon, Kim Jin-hwan	Kim Do-hoon, Choi Gab-won	3:29
6.	"Won't Give You" (안줄래; Anjullae)	Shinsadong Tiger, Choi Kyu-sung	Shinsadong Tiger, Choi Kyu-sung	3:18
7.	"Hot Issue (Remix)"	Shinsadong Tiger, Jeon Hye-won	Shinsadong Tiger, Lee Chae-kyu	3:14
Total length:				22:11

For Muzik For Asia (Asia Commemorate Edition) – CD
No.	Title	Length
8.	"Change" (HyunA feat. Jun Hyung)	3:29
9.	"Heard 'Em All" (Ameriie feat. 4minute & Beast)	3:31
Total length:		28:50

For Muzik For Asia (Asia Commemorate Edition) – DVD
No.	Title	Length
1.	"Hot Issue" (Music Video)
2.	"Muzik" (Music Video)
3.	"What A Girl Wants" (Music Video)
4.	"Change" (Music Video)
5.	"For Muzik" (Live At Cube Star's Party)
6.	"Muzik" (Live At Cube Star's Party)
7.	"Hot Issue" (Live At Cube Star's Party)

== Release history ==
Format	Release date
Digital download	August 28, 2009
CD	August 31, 2009
