= Hyuna discography =

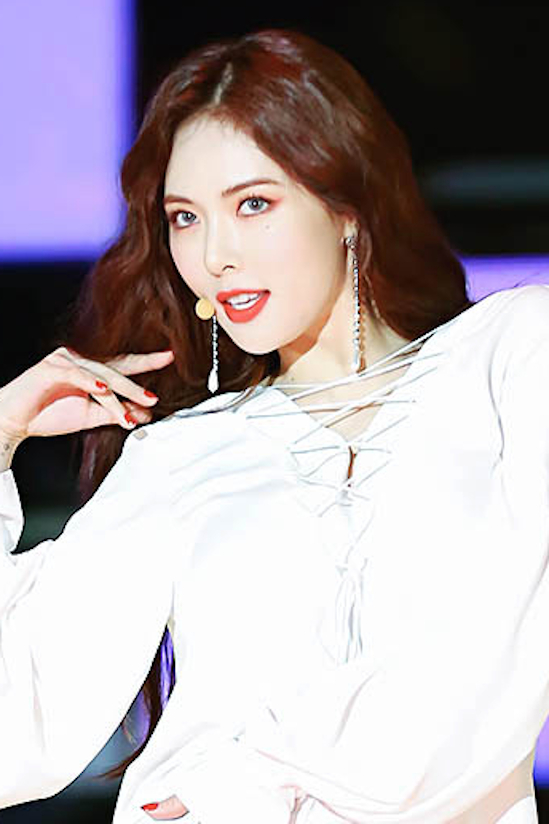
- Hyuna at Open Concert in September 2017
- Extended plays: 10
- Singles: 15
- Music videos: 14
- Single album: 1
- Collaborative EP: 1
- Collaborations: 7
- Promotional single: 2

South Korean singer-songwriter, rapper and model Hyuna has released ten extended plays (EPs), one collaboration extended play (EP), one single album, fifteen singles as a lead artist, and two promotional single. She debuted as a member of South Korean girl group Wonder Girls in February 2007, and later withdrawn from the group in July same year. She later debuted as member of South Korean girl group 4Minute In June 2009, and embarked on a solo career in 2010.

She debuted as a member of the girl group Wonder Girls in February 2007. After leaving the ensemble shortly after, Hyuna subsequently left JYP Entertainment and joined the girl group 4Minute, under Cube Entertainment. 4Minute debuted in June 2009 and went on to become one of the most popular girl groups in the country. In 2010, Hyuna began a solo career with a style she described as "performance-oriented music". Her debut single "Change" charted at number two on South Korea's Gaon Digital Chart.

In 2011, Hyuna gained wider public recognition with the release of her first extended play Bubble Pop!. The title track sold more than three million digital copies and she became the first female K-pop solo artist to reach 100 million views on a single music video on YouTube. Later the same year, she formed the duo Trouble Maker with former Beast member Hyunseung, releasing the hit single "Trouble Maker". In 2012, she appeared in a successful duet rendition of Psy's worldwide hit "Gangnam Style" and later released her second extended play Melting, which featured the number-one single "Ice Cream". Her next two extended plays A Talk and A+ yielded the successful singles "Red" and "Roll Deep", respectively. Following 4Minute's disbandment in mid-2016, she released her fifth extended play A'wesome, which was supported by her first concert tour The Queen's Back. In 2017, she was involved in the trio Triple H with Pentagon members Hui and E'Dawn before releasing her sixth extended play Following and her first single album Lip & Hip.

In 2018, Hyuna ended her contract with Cube Entertainment after several internal conflicts, and signed with Psy's P Nation the following year. Her first digital single under P Nation "Flower Shower" became her seventh top-ten entry on the US Billboard World Digital Song Sales. In 2021, Hyuna released her seventh extended play I'm Not Cool. In September, Hyuna and Dawn collaborated to release their duet extended play 1+1=1. In 2022, Hyuna released her eighth extended play Nabillera which is her last solo released under P Nation following her departure from the company in August 2022.

== Extended plays ==
List of extended plays, with selected chart positions and sales
| Title | Details | Peak chart positions | | | Sales |
| Title | Details | KOR | JPN | US World | Sales |
|---|---|---|---|---|---|
| Bubble Pop! | Released: July 5, 2011; Label: Cube Entertainment; Formats: CD, digital download | 7 | — | — | KOR: 9,851 |
| Melting | Released: October 22, 2012; Label: Cube Entertainment; Formats: CD, digital download | 5 | 158 | — | KOR: 12,297; JPN: 1,337 |
| A Talk | Released: July 28, 2014; Label: Cube Entertainment; Formats: CD, digital download | 3 | 175 | 13 | KOR: 8,637; JPN: 1,690 |
| A+ | Released: August 21, 2015; Label: Cube Entertainment; Formats: CD, digital download | 5 | — | 2 | KOR: 8,469 |
| A'wesome | Released: August 1, 2016; Label: Cube Entertainment; Formats: CD, digital download | 2 | — | 4 | KOR: 9,224 |
| Following | Released: August 29, 2017; Label: Cube Entertainment; Formats: CD, digital download | 9 | — | 5 | KOR: 8,097 |
| I'm Not Cool | Released: January 28, 2021; Label: P Nation; Formats: CD, digital download | 17 | — | — | KOR: 14,669 |
| 1+1=1 (with Dawn) | Released: September 9, 2021; Label: P Nation; Formats: CD, digital download | 13 | — | — | KOR: 14,824 |
| Nabillera | Released: July 20, 2022; Label: P Nation; Formats: CD, digital download | 14 | — | — | KOR: 15,177 |
| Attitude | Released: May 2, 2024; Label: At Area; Formats: CD, digital download | 23 | — | — | KOR: 16,000 |
"—" denotes releases that did not chart or were not released in that region.

== Single albums ==
List of single albums, with selected chart positions and sales
| Title | Details | Peak chart positions | Sales |
| Title | Details | KOR | Sales |
|---|---|---|---|
| Lip & Hip | Released: December 4, 2017; Labels: Cube Entertainment; Formats: CD, digital download | 14 | KOR: 3,000 |

== Singles ==
=== As lead artist ===
| Title | Year | Peak chart positions | | | | | | Sales (Note: Sales figures for tracks are based on digital downloads, except noted.) | Album |
| Title | Year | KOR | KOR Billb. (Note: Includes the Billboard K-pop Hot 100 (defunct as of 2022) and Billboard's South Korea Songs (active from May 2022 to January 2025).) | NZ Hot | SGP | US World | WW (Note: The Billboard Global 200 chart launched and was first issued on the date September 19, 2020.) | Sales | Album |
|---|---|---|---|---|---|---|---|---|---|
| "Change" (featuring Yong Jun-hyung) | 2010 | 2 | — | — | — | — | — | KOR: 2,469,354 | Non-album single |
| "A Bitter Day" (featuring Yong Jun-hyung and G.NA) | 2011 | 10 | 10 | — | — | — | — | KOR: 1,194,214 | Bubble Pop! |
| "Bubble Pop!" | 2011 | 4 | 9 | — | — | 10 | — | KOR: 2,694,310; US: 42,000 | Bubble Pop! |
| "Ice Cream" | 2012 | 1 | 10 | — | — | 5 | — | KOR: 1,285,770 | Melting |
| "Red" (빨개요) | 2014 | 3 | N/A | — | — | 5 | — | KOR: 685,761 | A Talk |
| "Roll Deep" (잘나가서 그래) (featuring Jung Il-hoon) | 2015 | 13 | N/A | — | — | 3 | — | KOR: 467,472; US: 1,000 | A+ |
| "How's This?" (어때?) | 2016 | 5 | N/A | — | — | 8 | — | KOR: 218,450 | A'wesome |
| "Babe" (베베) | 2017 | 13 | 13 | — | — | 10 | — | KOR: 450,770 | Following |
| "Lip & Hip" | 2017 | 16 | 36 | — | — | 5 | — | KOR: 136,855 | Lip & Hip (single) |
| "Flower Shower" | 2019 | 54 | 31 | — | — | 6 | — | US: 1,000 | I'm Not Cool |
| "I'm Not Cool" | 2021 | 9 | 11 | 25 | 14 | 8 | — (Note: "I'm Not Cool" did not enter the Billboard Global 200, but peaked at number 165 on the Excl. U.S. chart.) | —N/a | I'm Not Cool |
| "Ping Pong" (with Dawn) | 2021 | 101 | 45 | — | 23 | 10 | — | —N/a | 1+1=1 |
| "Nabillera" (나빌레라) | 2022 | 147 | — | — | — | — | — | —N/a | Nabillera |
| "Q&A" | 2024 | — (Note: "Q&A" did not enter the Circle Digital Chart, but debuted at number 52 on the Circle Download Chart.) | — | — | — | — | — | —N/a | Attitude |
| "Mrs. Nail" (못) | 2025 | — (Note: "Mrs. Nail" did not enter the Circle Digital Chart, but it peaked at number 60 on the Circle Download Chart.) | N/A | — | — | — | — | —N/a | Non-album single |
"—" denotes releases that did not chart or were not released in that region.

=== Collaborations ===
| Title | Year | Peak chart positions | | Sales (Note: Sales figures for tracks are based on digital downloads, except noted.) | Album |
| Title | Year | KOR | KOR Hot | Sales | Album |
|---|---|---|---|---|---|
| "Tomorrow" (as 4Tomorrow) | 2009 | — | — | —N/a | Non-album singles |
| "Faddy Robot Foundation" (with Yong Jun-hyung, Outsider, Verbal Jint, Ssangchu, Vasco and Zico) | 2010 | — | — | —N/a | Non-album singles |
| "Outlaw in the Wild" (with Nassun) | 2010 | 10 | — | —N/a | Non-album singles |
| "Say You Love Me" (with G.NA) | 2010 | 14 | — | —N/a | Together Forever Vol.1 |
| "Oppa Is Just My Style" (오빤 딱 내 스타일) (with Psy) | 2012 | — | — | —N/a | Non-album singles |
| "This Person" (as Dazzling Red) | 2012 | 2 | 6 | KOR: 672,579 | Non-album singles |
| "Follow Your Dreams" (한걸음) (as United Cube) | 2018 | — | — | —N/a | Non-album singles |
| "Upgrade" (as United Cube) | 2018 | — | — | —N/a | Non-album singles |
| "Young & One" (as United Cube) | 2018 | — | — | —N/a | Non-album singles |
"—" denotes releases that did not chart or were not released in that region.

=== As featured artist ===
| Title | Year | Peak chart positions | Sales (Note: Sales figures for tracks are based on digital downloads, except noted.) | Album |
| Title | Year | KOR | Sales | Album |
|---|---|---|---|---|
| "2009" (AJ feat. Hyuna) | 2009 | — | —N/a | First Episode: A New Hero |
| "Wasteful Tears" (Navi feat. Hyuna) | 2009 | — | —N/a | Hello |
| "Bittersweet" (Brave Brothers feat. M, Hyuna, Maboos, Red Roc, Basick) | 2009 | — | —N/a | Attitude |
| "Oh Yeah" (MBLAQ feat. Hyuna) | 2009 | — | —N/a | Non-album singles |
| "Love Parade" (Park Yun-hwa feat. Hyuna) | 2010 | — | —N/a | Non-album singles |
| "Golden Lady" (Lim Jeong Hee feat. Hyuna) | 2011 | 4 | KOR: 1,602,615 | Golden Lady |
| "Let It Go" (Heo Young Saeng feat. Hyuna) | 2011 | 19 | KOR: 740,258 | Let It Go |
| "She Is My Girl" (S4 feat. Hyuna) | 2012 | — | —N/a | Sexy, Sweet, Smart & Sentimental |
| "Maker" (Roh Ji-hoon feat. Hyuna) | 2012 | — | —N/a | The Next Big Thing |
| "Don't Hurt" (Eru feat. Hyuna) | 2012 | 33 | —N/a | Non-album single |
| "Where You Going Oppa?" (Rain feat. Hyuna) | 2014 | 96 | KOR: 33,664 | Rain Effect |
| "Like Water" (Jambino feat. Hyuna and Loco) | 2022 | 114 | —N/a | Show Me the Money 11 Semi Final |
"—" denotes releases that did not chart or were not released in that region.

=== Promotional singles ===
| Title | Year | Album |
|---|---|---|
| "My Color" (Note: "My Color" was released for promoting the 2013 Toyota Corolla.) | 2013 | Non-album single |
| "Attitude" | 2023 | Attitude |

== Other charted songs ==
| Title | Year | Peak chart positions | | Sales (Note: Sales figures for tracks are based on digital downloads, except noted.) | Album |
| Title | Year | KOR | KOR Hot | Sales | Album |
|---|---|---|---|---|---|
| "Attention" | 2011 | 127 | — | KOR: 49,760 | Bubble Pop! |
| "Downtown"(feat Jiyoon) | 2011 | 106 | — | KOR: 56,414 | Bubble Pop! |
| "Just Follow" (feat. Dok2) | 2011 | 113 | 27 | KOR: 65,373 | Bubble Pop! |
| "Unripe Apple" | 2012 | 70 | — | KOR: 59,729 | Melting |
| "Straight Up" | 2012 | 138 | — | KOR: 43,613 | Melting |
| "To My Boyfriend" | 2012 | 63 | — | —N/a | Melting |
| "Very Hot" | 2012 | 77 | — | KOR: 46,807 | Melting |
| "Blacklist" (feat. LE) | 2014 | 17 | 78 | KOR: 43,202 | A Talk |
| "A Talk" | 2014 | 90 | — | —N/a | A Talk |
| "Serene" | 2015 | 97 | — | —N/a | A+ |
| "Ice Ice" (feat. Yuk Ji-dam) | 2015 | 99 | — | KOR: 18,525 | A+ |
| "Run & Run" | 2015 | 99 | — | KOR: 20,919 | A+ |
| "Get Out Of My House" (feat. Kwon Jung-yeol) | 2015 | 108 | — | —N/a | A+ |
| "U & Me♡" | 2016 | 99 | — | KOR: 23,467 | A'wesome |
| "Do It!" | 2016 | 168 | — | KOR: 11,806 | A'wesome |
| "Morning Glory" | 2016 | 126 | — | KOR: 11,126 | A'wesome |
| "Freaky" | 2016 | 118 | — | KOR: 10,086 | A'wesome |
| "Dart" | 2017 | 89 | — | —N/a | Following |
| "Good Girl" | 2021 | — (Note: "Good Girl" did not enter the Gaon Digital Chart, but peaked at number 83 on the component Download Chart.) | — | —N/a | I'm Not Cool |
| "Party, Feel, Love" (featuring Dawn) | 2021 | — (Note: "Party, Feel, Love" did not enter the Gaon Digital Chart, but peaked at number 148 on the component Download Chart.) | — | —N/a | I'm Not Cool |
| "Show Window" | 2021 | — (Note: "Show Window" did not enter the Gaon Digital Chart, but peaked at number 181 on the component Download Chart.) | — | —N/a | I'm Not Cool |
| "Bad Dog" | 2022 | — (Note: "Bad Dog" did not enter the Circle Digital Chart, but debuted at number 178 on the Circle Download Chart.) | — | —N/a | Nabillera |
"—" denotes releases that did not chart or were not released in that region.

== Guest appearances ==
| Year | Song | Other artist(s) | Album |
|---|---|---|---|
| 2009 | "Dancing Shoes" | AJ | First Episode: A New Hero |
| 2012 | "Gangnam Style" | Psy | Psy 6 (Six Rules), Part 1 |
| 2015 | "You Know" | Jay Park | Worldwide |

== Music videos ==
| Music video | Year | Director | Notes | Ref. |
|---|---|---|---|---|
| "Change" | 2010 | Hong Won-ki (Zanybros) | —N/a | |
| "Bubble Pop!" | 2011 | Hong Won-ki (Zanybros) | —N/a | |
| "Oppa Is Just My Style" | 2012 | Unknown | with Psy | |
| "Ice Cream" | 2012 | Hong Won-ki (Zanybros) | Guest appearance by Psy | |
| "Corolla x Hyuna: My Color" | 2013 | Unknown | Short version to promote the 2013 Toyota Corolla. | |
| "Red" | 2014 | Hong Won-ki (Zanybros) | —N/a | |
| "Roll Deep" | 2015 | Hong Won-ki (Zanybros) | 19+ "A+ Original Version" also released. | |
| "Run & Run" | 2015 | Hong Won-ki (Zanybros) | —N/a | |
| "How's This?" | 2016 | Hong Won-ki (Zanybros) | —N/a | |
| "Morning Glory" | 2016 | Hong Won-ki (Zanybros) | —N/a | |
| "Babe" | 2017 | Shin Hee-won | —N/a | |
| "Lip & Hip" | 2017 | Choi Yongseok (Lumpens) | —N/a | |
| "Flower Shower" | 2019 | Paranoid Paradigm (VM Project Architecture) | —N/a | |
| "I'm Not Cool" | 2021 | Naive Creative Production | —N/a | |
| "Good Girl" | 2021 | Paranoid Paradigm (VM Project Architecture) | —N/a | |
| "Ping Pong" | 2021 | Naive Creative Production | —N/a | |
| "Nabillera" | 2022 | Woogie Kim (MOTHER) | —N/a | |
| "Attitude" | 2023 | Rigend Film | AT AREA : Performance Video | |
| "Q&A" | 2024 | Lee Han-gyeol (Hanbago) | —N/a | |
| "Mrs. Nail" | 2025 | —N/a | —N/a | |

== See also ==
- 4Minute discography
- Trouble Maker discography
- Triple H discography
- Wonder Girls discography
