= Rain discography =

South Korean entertainer discography

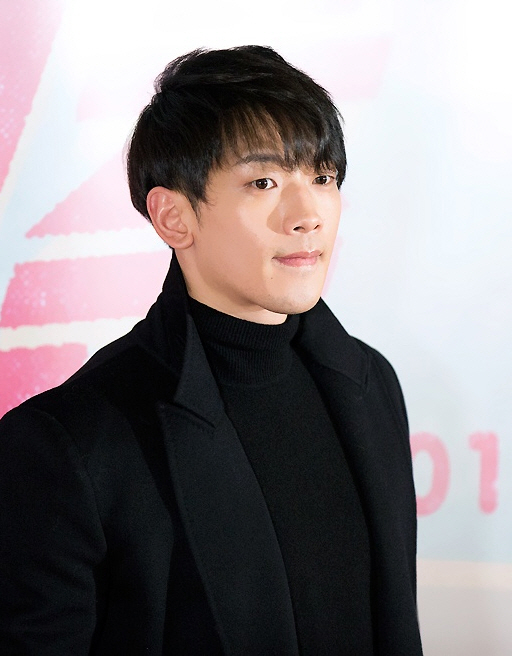
- Rain in 2014
- Studio albums: 7
- Extended plays: 3
- Soundtrack albums: 1
- Compilation albums: 1
- Singles: 33
- Music videos: 24
- Album appearances: 6
- DVD: 9

The discography of South Korean entertainer Rain consists of seven studio albums, one compilation album, three extended plays, and thirty-three singles. His debut studio album Bad Guy was released in May 2002 and sold over 140,000 copies in South Korea. His sophomore studio album, How to Avoid the Sun, was released in October 2003 and spawned the titular single, which ranked at number one of the music program charts for multiple weeks.

Rain's third studio album, It's Raining, was released in October 2004 and sold over one million copies across Asia according to the Korea Creative Content Agency, including over 200,000 copies in South Korea, 100,000 copies in Japan, 500,000 copies in China, and 70,000 copies in Taiwan. The record spawned the singles "It's Raining" and "I Do". Rain released his first original album in Japanese, titled Eternal Rain, in September 2006. The album peaked at number 19 on the Oricon Album Chart and sold 19,000 copies.

== Albums ==
=== Studio albums ===
Title	Album details	Peak chart positions				Sales
Title	Album details	KOR (Note: The Gaon Album Chart was established in 2010. Positions prior to this refer to the monthly domestic Music Industry Association of Korea (MIAK) positions, the predecessor to Gaon.)	JPN	TWN	TWN East Asia	Sales
Bad Guy	Released: May 13, 2002 (KOR); Label: JYP Entertainment; Format: CD, cassette	9	—	—	—	KOR: 143,414
How to Avoid the Sun	Released: October 16, 2003 (KOR); Label: JYP Entertainment; Format: CD, cassette	6	—	—	—	KOR: 166,731
It's Raining	Released: October 8, 2004 (KOR); Label: JYP Entertainment; Format: CD, cassette	3	15	—	1	KOR: 202,764; JPN: 100,000; TWN: 70,000
Eternal Rain	Released: September 13, 2006 (JPN); Label: King Records; Format: CD, CD+DVD	—	14	6	1	JPN: 19,000
Rain's World	Released: October 14, 2006 (KOR); Label: JYP Entertainment; Format: CD, cassette	1	57	7	1	KOR: 121,357
Rainism	Released: October 15, 2008 (KOR); Label: J. Tune Entertainment; Format: CD, digital download	33	22	10	2	KOR: 131,571; JPN: 9,000
Rain Effect	Released: January 2, 2014 (KOR); Label: Cube Entertainment; Format: CD, digital download, streaming	1	—	—	—	KOR: 37,431
"—" denotes releases that did not chart.

=== Reissues ===
Title	Album details	Peak chart positions	Sales
Title	Album details	KOR	Sales
Rain's World Repackaged	Released: December 22, 2006 (KOR); Label: JYP Entertainment; Format: CD	12	KOR: 9,574
Rainism Recollection	Released: March 3, 2009 (KOR); Label: J.Tune Entertainment; Format: CD, digital download	—	
Rain Effect Special Edition	Released: February 7, 2014 (KOR); Label: Cube Entertainment; Format: CD, digital download	10	KOR: 3,756
"—" denotes releases that did not chart.

=== Compilation albums ===
Title	Album details	Peak chart positions	Sales
Title	Album details	JPN	Sales
Early Works	Released: December 7, 2005 (JPN); Label: King Records; Format: CD	35	JPN: 9,013

== Extended plays ==
Title	Details	Peak chart positions			Sales
Title	Details	KOR	JPN	JPN Sales	Sales
Back to the Basic	Released: April 7, 2010 (KOR); Label: J.Tune Entertainment; Format: CD, digital download	1	25	71	KOR: 56,390; JPN: 8,097
My Life	Released: December 1, 2017 (KOR); Label: Rain Company, Genie Music; Format: CD, digital download, streaming	7	—	—	KOR: 8,952
Pieces by Rain	Released: March 3, 2021 (KOR); Label: Rain Company, Genie Music; Format: CD, digital download, streaming	23	—	—	KOR: 11,361
"—" denotes releases that did not chart.

== Singles ==
=== As lead artist ===
==== Korean singles ====
Title	Year	Peak chart positions			Sales	Album
Title	Year	KOR (Note: The Gaon Digital Chart was first published in 2010.)	KOR Hot (Note: The K-pop Hot 100 was first published in August 2011.)	US World (Note: The US World Digital Song Sales chart was first published in January 2010.)	Sales	Album
"Bad Guy" (나쁜 남자)	2002	*	*	*		Bad Guy
"Hand Shake" (악수)	2002	*	*	*		Bad Guy
"Instead of Saying Goodbye" (안녕이란 말대신)	2002	*	*	*		Bad Guy
"How to Avoid the Sun" (태양을 피하는 방법)	2003	*	*	*		Rain 2
"You Already Knew"	2003	*	*	*		Rain 2
"It's Raining"	2004	*	*	*		It's Raining
"I Do"	2004	*	*	*		It's Raining
"I'm Coming" (featuring Tablo)	2006	*	*	*		Rain's World
"In My Bed"	2006	*	*	*		Rain's World
"With U"	2006	*	*	*		Rain's World
"Love Story"	2008	*	*	*		Rainism
"Rainism"	2008	*	*	*		Rainism
"September 12th" (9월 12일)	2009	*	*	*		Rainism
"Love Song" (널 붙잡을 노래)	2010	1	*	—	KOR: 2,290,000	Back to the Basic
"Hip Song"	2010	6	*	—	KOR: 1,600,000	Back to the Basic
"Busan Woman" (부산 여자)	2011	4	9	—	KOR: 993,000	Non-album single
"30 Sexy"	2014	12	8	15	KOR: 281,000	Rain Effect
"La Song"	2014	8	6	25	KOR: 773,000	Rain Effect
"I Love You" (사랑해)	2014	32	23	—	KOR: 118,000	Rain Effect
"The Best Present"	2017	5	—	22	KOR: 388,000	Non-album single
"Goodbye" (오늘 헤어져) (featuring Jo Hyun-ah of Urban Zakapa)	2017	81	85	—	KOR: 33,000	My Life
"Gang" (깡)	2017	40	89	—		My Life
"Beginning" (시작할까, 나) (with Soyou)	2019	94	—	—		The Love of Autumn
"Switch to Me" (with J.Y. Park)	2020	15	8	—		Pieces by Rain
"Why Don't We" (featuring Chungha)	2021	106	52	—		Pieces by Rain
"Magnetic" (featuring Jackson Wang)	2021	— (Note: "Magnetic" did not enter the Gaon Digital Chart, but it peaked at #99 on the component Download Chart.)	—	15		Pieces by Rain
"Domestic"	2022	146	—	—		Non-album single
“Feel It”	2026	N/A	N/A	N/A		Non-album single
"—" denotes releases that did not chart or were not released in that region. "*" denotes that chart did not exist at the time.

==== Japanese singles ====
Title	Year	Peak chart positions	Sales	Album
Title	Year	JPN	Sales	Album
"Sad Tango"	2006	14	JPN: 25,748 (phy.)	Eternal Rain
"Free Way"	2006	15	JPN: 17,005 (phy.)	Eternal Rain
"Move On"	2006	17	JPN: 10,584 (phy.)	Eternal Rain

==== Chinese singles ====
Title	Year	Album
"Memory In My Hand" (S手記; Shou Ji)	2006	Non-album single
"Any Dream"	2008	Non-album single
"I'm Ready"	2008	Non-album single
"Diamond Lover" (featuring Ravi)	2015	Diamond Lover OST
"Pretend"	2015	Diamond Lover OST

=== Promotional singles ===
Title	Year	Peak chart positions	Album
Title	Year	KOR DL	Album
"I Do" (Japanese version)	2005	*	It's Raining
"Notes (from)…" (手记; Shou Ji)	2006	*	Non-album singles
"Still Believe"	2006	*	Non-album singles
"Go Forward"	2006	*	Non-album singles
"Summer Taste" (Note: "Summer Taste" was released as a promotional single in collaboration with Pepsi, along with singers Shownu, Hyungwon, and I.M (Monsta X), Yujeong and Yuna (Brave Girls), Hongjoong and Yunho (Ateez)).)	2021	54	Taste of Korea
"*" denotes that chart did not exist at the time.

=== Other charted songs ===
Title	Year	Peak chart positions	Sales	Album
Title	Year	KOR	Sales	Album
"One"	2010	32		Back to the Basic
"Same" (똑같아)	2010	39		Back to the Basic
"Oppa" (어디 가요. 오빠) (featuring Hyuna)	2014	96	KOR: 34,000	Rain Effect
"Marilyn Monroe" (마릴린 먼로)	2014	126	KOR: 26,000	Rain Effect
"Baby" (차에 타봐)	2014	157	KOR: 13,000	Rain Effect
"Found Out" (알아버렸어)	2014	177	KOR: 12,000	Rain Effect
"Superman"	2014	178	KOR: 12,000	Rain Effect
"Dear Mama, Don't Cry"	2014	182	KOR: 11,000	Rain Effect
"Rain Effect"	2014	192	KOR: 10,000	Rain Effect
"—" denotes releases that did not chart or were not released in that region.

== Other appearances ==
Title	Year	Album
"How Much I Love You" (Byul featuring Rain)	2002	December 32
"Perfect Interaction" (Leehom Wang featuring Lim Jeong-hee & Rain)	2005	Heroes of Earth
"Too Much (Remix)" (Ai featuring Rain)	2006	What's Goin' On Ai
"Man Up" (Omarion featuring Rain)	2006	21 (European edition)
"The Club" (The Grace featuring Rain)	2007	One More Time, OK?
"Kung Fu Fighting"	2008	Kung Fu Panda
"Things I Want to Do When I Have a Lover" (G.NA featuring Rain)	2010	Draw G's First Breath

== Videography ==
=== Concert tour videos ===
Title	Album details	Peak chart positions
Title	Album details	JPN
Rainy Day, Rain's First Live Concert	Released: June 25, 2005; Languages: Korean, Chinese; Labels: JYP Entertainment, Universal Music Japan	17
Rain's Coming, Rain World Tour	Released: September 17, 2008; Language: Korean, Japanese, English; Label: J. Tune Entertainment	16
Legend Of Rainism Tour	Released: September 2, 2010; Language: Korean/Japanese/English; Label: J. Tune Entertainment	27
The Best Show Tour	Released: October 20, 2012; Language: Korean, Japanese, English; Label: J. Tune Entertainment	—

=== Music video compilations ===
Title	Album details	Peak chart positions
Title	Album details	JPN
Rain's Video Clips 2002–2006	Released: May 23, 2006; Language: Korean; Labels: JYP Entertainment, Universal Music Japan	60

=== Documentaries ===
Title	Album details	Peak chart positions
Title	Album details	JPN
Road to Rain	Released: May 25, 2006; Language: Korean, Japanese, English; Labels: JYP Entertainment	22
All About Rain – World Star	Released: October 27, 2007; Language: Korean, Japanese, English; Labels: JYP Entertainment	60
Rain's 24 Hours: The Day	Released: June 25, 2008; Languages: Korean, Japanese, English; Labels: J. Tune Entertainment	36

=== Music videos ===
Title	Year	Director
"Bad Guy"	2002	
"Handshakes"	2002	
"Instead of Saying Goodbye"	2002	
"How to Avoid the Sun"	2003	
"It's Raining"	2004	
"I Do"	2004	
"Nan"	2004	
"Sad Tango"	2006	
"Free Way"	2006	
"Move On"	2006	
"Still Believe"	2006	
"I'm Coming"	2006	
"In My Bed"	2006	
"Any Dream"	2008	
"Love Story"	2008	Lee Sang Gyu
"Rainism"	2008	Jang Jae Hyeok
"9월 12일 (Acoustic)"	2008	
"Love Song"	2010	
"Hip Song"	2010	
"Busan Woman"	2011	
"30 Sexy"	2014	Lumpens
"La Song"	2014	Lumpens
"I Love You"	2014	
"The Best Present"	2017	
"Goodbye"	2017	
"Gang"	2017	
