= Melting (disambiguation) =

Melting is the process of a solid changing into a liquid.

Melting may also refer to:

- Melting (EP), an EP by Hyuna
- Melting (album), an album by Mamamoo
- "Melting", a song by King Gizzard & the Lizard Wizard in Flying Microtonal Banana
