= 2015 Mnet Asian Music Awards =

Award ceremony in Hong Kong

- Date: December 2, 2015
- Location: AsiaWorld–Expo, Hong Kong
- Hosted by: Psy; Red Carpet hosts: Moon Hee-joon, Shin A-young, Z.Hera
- Most awards: Big Bang (4) Exo (4)
- Most nominations: Big Bang (6)
- Website: Mnet Asian Music Awards

Television/radio coverage
- Network: South Korea: Mnet; Japan: Mnet Japan; Southeast Asia: Channel M Thailand: GMM 25; Philippines: Myx; Cambodia: MyTV; China: iQiyi; Taiwan: MTV Mandarin
- Runtime: 120 minutes (Red Carpet); 240 minutes (Main event)

The 2015 Mnet Asian Music Awards ceremony, organized by CJ E&M through its music channel Mnet, took place on December 2, 2015, at AsiaWorld-Expo in Hong Kong. The ceremony was the sixth consecutive Mnet Asian Music Awards to be hosted outside of South Korea.

Nominees were announced on October 30, 2015. Leading the nominees and awards was Big Bang with six. By the end of the ceremony the group received four wins alongside Exo, the most received awards of the night.

== Background ==
This event marked the seventeenth Mnet Asian Music Awards. It was simultaneously broadcast live in Korea, Japan, America, Southeast Asia through various channels as well as via online live streaming.

The event took place in the same country and the same venue for the third consecutive time. This year MAMA's theme/concept included "...fantastic stages through 'State of TechArt', a concept that combines cutting-edge technology and art." About 10,000 fans and 2,000 staff members attended the awards show.

== Performers ==
List of performances at 2015 MAMA
Artist(s)	Song(s)	Notes
Pre-show
Seventeen	"Adore U"	
Monsta X	"Trespass", "Hero"	
Vivian Koo	"Listen to the Sea"	
Got7	"Girls, Girls, Girls"	
Main show
The Koxx	"Trojan Horse"	"TechArt" (opening act)
Echae Kang and Choi Soojin	"Butterfly"	"TechArt" (opening act)
Taeyeon	"I"	"TechArt" (opening act)
Got7	"If You Do"	"Virtual Boys"
BTS	"Run"	"Virtual Boys"
Zion.T and Kim Seol-jin	"Yanghwa BRDG"	"Bridge of Memories"
iKon	"Apology", "Anthem", "Rhythm Ta"	"iKon is Coming"
Superstar K7's Kevin Oh	"Fix You"	"Brighter Future"
Basick, Lil Boi, Truedy, Yezi	"Watch Your Mouth", "Picked", "Bandz Up", "GXNZI", "Don't Stop"	"Show Me The Rapstar"
Jessi	"Ssenunni"	"Tough Enough"
Hyuna	"Roll Deep", "Red"	"Tough Enough"
San E	"Do It For Fun"	"Tough Enough"
Jolin Tsai	"Play"	"Queen of the Night"
Monsta X and Seventeen ft. Kim So-hyun	"Trespass", "Mansae"	"The Boys"
Park Jin-young	"24 Hours", "Who's Your Mama?", "Elevator" & "Honey"	"Sense of Swings"
CL	"The Baddest Female", "Hello Bitches"	"The Baddest Female"
2NE1 (Note: Surprise performance)	"Fire", "I Am the Best"	"The Baddest Female"
Exo	"Call Me Baby", "Lightsaber", "Drop That", "Love Me Right"	"Light of Planet"
Shinee	"Savior", "View"	"Marvelous"
Big Bang	"Loser", "Bae Bae", "Bang Bang Bang"	"Truth + Dare"
f(x)	"4 Walls"	"Electric Harmony"
Pet Shop Boys	"Vocal Intro", "Go West", "Always on My Mind"	"Electric Harmony"
f(x) and Pet Shop Boys	"What Have I Done to Deserve This?", "Vocal"	"Electric Harmony"
Psy	"Napal Baji", "Daddy", "Gangnam Style"	"2015 Psy Returns"

== Presenters ==
2015 Mnet Asian Music Awards host

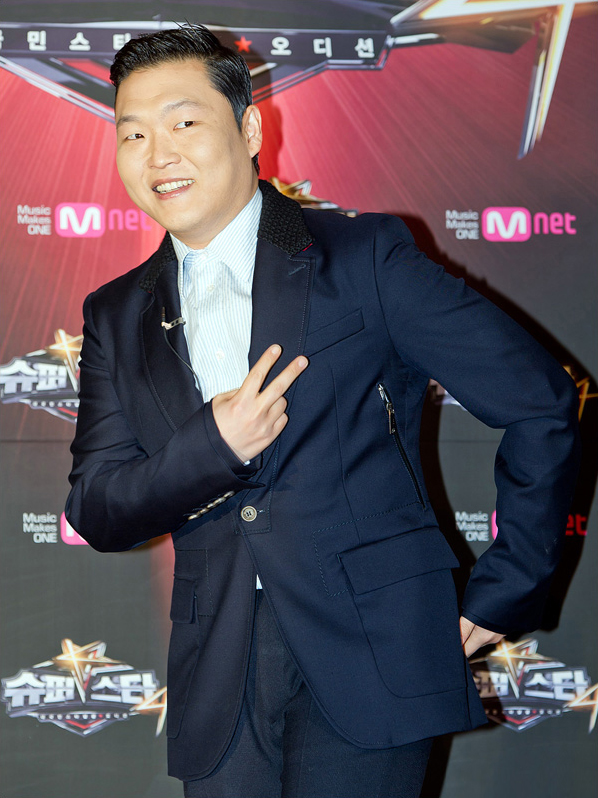
Psy

- Moon Hee-joon, Shin A-young, Z.Hera – red carpet hosts
- Psy – main host
- Yeo Jin-goo and Kim So-hyun – presented Best New Artist
- Jung Suk-won and Hong Soo-ah – presented Best Music Video
- Seo Kang-joon and Kim So-eun – presented Best Dance Performance – Solo and Best Rap Performance
- Lee Kwang-soo and Park Bo-young – presented Best Female Artist and Best Male Artist
- Park Shin-hye – introduced 'Girls' Education' campaign
- Park Bo-gum – promoted sponsor Olive Young (via video)
- Lee Ki-woo and Stephanie Lee – presented Worldwide Favourite Artist
- Kim Jong-kook – presented Best Asian Artist awardee Jolin Tsai
- Ha Seok-jin and Han Chae-young – presented Global Fan's Choice
- Yoo Yeon-seok and Son Ho-jun – presented Best Vocal Performance
- Go Ah-sung – presented Professional Awards
- Kim Kang-woo and Uee – presented Best Dance Performance – Group
- Park Jin-young – introduced Pet Shop Boys
- Krystal Jung – presented Worldwide Inspiration Award
- Han Suk-joon – introduced performer Exo
- Kim Jong-kook and Park Shin-hye – presented Best Collaboration & Unit
- Claudia Kim and Elena Torres – presented Best World Performer
- Lee Sang-yoon and Choo Ja-hyun – presented Best Male Group and Best Female Group
- Gong Hyo-jin – presented Song of the Year
- Lee Jung-jae and Han Hyo-joo – presented Album of the Year
- Chow Yun-fat – presented Artist of the Year

== Judging criteria ==
Eligible nominees included songs or albums released from October 26, 2014, until October 30 the next year. Winners will be selected based on six categories including online voting and evaluation from MAMA professional panel. (Note: Overseas categories and Professional categories have different criteria.)

Division	Online Voting	Research	MAMA Professional Panel (Local + Foreign)	Music Sales	Record Sales	MAMA Selection Committee
Artist of the Year Award Category by Artist*	20%	20%	20%	20%	10%	10%
Song of the Year Award Category by Genre**	10%	20%	20%	30%	10%	10%
Album of the Year	—	—	30%	—	50%	20%
Special Prize***	30%	—	50%	—	—	20%
*UnionPay Artist of the Year, Best New (M)ale/(F)emale Artist, Best M/F Artist, Best M/F Group (7 total); **UnionPay Song of the Year, Best Dance Performance (Solo/M/F Group), Best Vocal Performance (M/F), Best Rap Performance, Best Band Performance, Best Collaboration (9 total); ***Best Music Video

== Winners and nominees ==
Winners are listed first and highlighted in boldface.

Artist of the Year (Daesang)	Album of the Year (Daesang)
**Big Bang**; Exo; Zion.T; Shinee; Girls' Generation	**Exo – Exodus**; Big Bang – Made; BTS – The Most Beautiful Moment In Life, Part 1; Shinee – Odd; Super Junior – Devil
Song of the Year (Daesang)	Best Music Video
**Big Bang – "Bang Bang Bang"**; Exo – "Call Me Baby"; Zion.T – "Eat"; Park Jin-young – "Who's Your Mama?"; Taeyeon – "I"	**Big Bang – "Bae Bae"**; f(x) – "4 Walls"; Shinee – "Married to the Music"; Wonder Girls – "I Feel You"; Infinite – "Bad"
Best Male Artist	Best Female Artist
**Park Jin-young**; Zion.T; Kyuhyun; Jung Yong-hwa; Jonghyun	**Taeyeon**; BoA; IU; Ailee; Hyuna
Best Male Group	Best Female Group
**Exo**; Big Bang; BTS; Shinee; Super Junior; Shinhwa	**Girls' Generation**; AOA; Apink; Miss A; Sistar; Wonder Girls
Best Dance Performance – Male Group	Best Dance Performance – Female Group
**Shinee – "View"**; Big Bang – "Bang Bang Bang"; Exo – "Call Me Baby"; Got7 – "If You Do"; VIXX – "Love Equation"; Infinite – "Bad"	**Red Velvet – "Ice Cream Cake"**; AOA – "Heart Attack"; EXID – "Ah Yeah"; Girl's Day – "Ring My Bell"; Sistar – "Shake It"; 4Minute – "Crazy"
Best Dance Performance – Solo	Best Collaboration and Unit
**Hyuna – "Roll Deep"**; Gain – "Paradise Lost"; Niel – "Lovekiller"; Park Jin-young – "Who's Your Mama?"; Amber – "Shake that Brass"	**Zion.T & Crush – "Just"**; Bastarz – "Zero for Conduct"; VIXX LR – "Beautiful Liar"; Soyou & Kwon Jung-yeol – "Lean on Me"; Infinite H – "Pretty"
Best Vocal Performance – Male	Best Vocal Performance – Female
**Zion.T – "Eat"**; SG Wannabe – "Love You"; Kyuhyun – "At Gwanghwamun"; Im Chang-jung – "Love Again"; Huh Gak – "Snow of April"	**Ailee – "Mind Your Own Business"**; Davichi – "Cry Again"; Mamamoo – "Um Oh Ah Yeh"; Baek A-yeon – "Shouldn't Have"; Taeyeon – "I"
Best Band Performance	Best Rap Performance
**CNBLUE – "Cinderella"**; F.T. Island – "Pray"; Nell – "Green Nocturne"; JJY Band – "OMG"; Hyukoh – "Comes and Goes"	**San E – "Me You"** (ft. Baek Ye-rin); Gary – "Get Some Air"; Dok2 – "I Will"; Mad Clown – "Fire"; Jay Park – "Mommae"
Best New Artist – Male	Best New Artist – Female
**iKon**; N.Flying; Monsta X; Seventeen; UP10TION	**Twice**; CLC; Lovelyz; GFriend; Oh My Girl

=== Special Awards ===
- Next Generation Asian Artist – **Monsta X**
- Best Asian Style – **Exo**
- iQiYi Worldwide Favourite Artist – **Big Bang**
- Best Asian Artist: **Potato**; **Dong Nhi**; **RAN**; **Stefanie Sun**; **AKB48**; **Jolin Tsai**
- Sina Weibo Global Fan's Choice – Female: **f(x)**
- Sina Weibo Global Fan's Choice – Male: **Exo**
- Best Producer: **Park Jin-young**; **Phuc Bo**; **Gao Xiaosong**
- Best Engineer: **Ko Hyun-jong**; **Lupo Groinig**; **Yoshinori Nakayama**
- Best Live Entertainment: **In Jae-jin**; **Wu Qun Da**; **Vit Suthitnavil**
- Worldwide Inspiration Award – **Pet Shop Boys**
- Best World Performer – **BTS**

=== Multiple wins ===
The following artist(s) received two or more wins (excluding the special awards):

Awards	Artist(s)
3	Big Bang
2	Exo
2	Zion.T (Note: Includes collaboration and/or subunits.)

=== Multiple nominations ===
The following artist(s) received two or more nominations (excluding the special awards):

Nominations	Artist(s)
6	Big Bang
5	Shinee
5	Exo
5	Zion.T
3	Park Jin-young
3	Taeyeon
3	Infinite
2	Girls' Generation
2	BTS
2	AOA
2	Sistar
2	Kyuhyun
2	VIXX
2	Ailee
2	Super Junior
2	Wonder Girls
2	Hyuna

== 2NE1's performance ==
2NE1's surprise performance at the award ceremony was met with considerable media attention. Following the conclusion of CL's "Hello Bitches", the rest of the group suddenly appeared onstage and reunited to perform "Fire" and "I Am the Best". Because of Park Bom's hiatus following her scandal from 2014, it was the group's first performance in a year and would be ultimately their last before their disbandment in 2016.

Although the group's performance was met with generally negative reactions from netizens in South Korea, it was well-received internationally, with Fuse naming it as one of the best performances of 2015 worldwide alongside those of Beyoncé and Madonna. Cosmopolitan Philippines and SBS PopAsia named it one of the most unforgettable performances in MAMA history.
