= A Song for You (Roh Ji-hoon song) =

- Cover of A Song for You

Single by Roh Ji-hoon
- Released: February 4, 2014
- Recorded: 2014
- Genre: K-pop, Ballad
- Length: 3:17
- Label: Cube Entertainment (recording) , Universal Music Group (distribution) ,
- Songwriters: Roh Ji-hoon, Gen Neo

Roh Ji-hoon singles chronology
| "Punishment" (2012) | "A Song for You" (2014) |

Music video
- 노지훈 (Roh Jihoon) - '너를 노래해 (A Song For You) on YouTube

"A Song for You" is the second official single released by the South Korean singer, Roh Ji-hoon. It was released digitally on February 4, 2014.

== Background ==
On May 27, 2013, Cube Entertainment's CEO Hong Seung-sung released a letter on Cube Entertainment's official website regarding the plans of Cubes' artists and mentioned that Roh Ji-hoon would release a new song soon and had been preparing his new release. On February 3, 2014, the official music video of "A Song for Yo" was uploaded onto Cube Entertainment's official YouTube channel and the single was released digitally the next day. "A Song For You" was written and composed by Roh Ji-hoon himself with the writer and producer Gen Neo from NoizeBank and also features Shorry J from Mighty Mouth.

== Promotion ==
On February 6, 2014, Roh Ji-hoon began promotional appearances on Mnet's M! Countdown and other music programs.

== Track list ==
| No. | Title | Lyrics | Music | Arrangement | Length |
|---|---|---|---|---|---|
| 1. | "너를 노래해" (A Song for You) | Roh Ji-hoon, Shorry J (Rap part) | Roh Ji-hoon, Gen Neo | Roh Ji-hoon, Gen Neo | 3:17 |
| Total length: | | | | | 3:17 |

== Chart performance ==
| Year | Title | Peak positions | |
| Year | Title | KOR Gaon | KOR Billboard |
|---|---|---|---|
| 2014 | "너를 노래해 (A Song for You)" | 45 | 35 |
"—" denotes releases that did not chart or were not released in that region.
