= Early Works =

Early Works may refer to:

- Early Works (Taylor Hicks album)
- Early Works (Rain album)
- Early Works (film), a 1969 Yugoslavian film
