= Black & White (G.NA album) =

Studio album by G.NA
- Released: January 18, 2011
- Genre: K-pop; electropop; dance-pop
- Length: 34:51
- Label: Cube; Universal Music

G.NA chronology
Draw G's First Breath (2010)	Black & White (2011)	Top Girl (2011)

Singles from Black & White
- 1. "Nice to Meet You" Released: January 11, 2011; 2. "Black & White" Released: January 18, 2011; 3. "I Miss You Already" Released: March 8, 2011

Black & White is the debut studio album by Canadian-South Korean singer G.NA. It features the title track of the same name, "Black & White". The album was released on January 18, 2011.

== Background ==
For the album's creation, G.NA collaborated with producer Kim Dohoon, as well as singers like Wheesung, Rain, and BEAST's Junhyung.

On January 4, 2011, Cube Entertainment revealed that G.NA would return with a full album. She released the song "Nice to Meet You" featuring Wheesung on January 11, 2011. The same day, it was confirmed that she would release her album on the 18th with the title track "Black and White".

On January 13, 2011, a teaser for "Black & White" was released on her official YouTube channel. The full music video for "Black & White" was then released on January 17, 2011, the album was then released in record stores one day after the music video for "Black & White" was released on YouTube. The music video features 2AM member Jinwoon.

The album reached number 22 on the Gaon Album Chart.

On March 8, 2011, a music video for "I Miss You Already" was released on G.NA's official YouTube channel.

== Track listing ==
CD track list:
No.	Title	Length
1.	"Black & White"	3:27
2.	"Don't Be Mad Anymore"	3:23
3.	"Nice To Meet You" (Feat. Wheesung)	3:52
4.	"I Miss You Already"	3:17
5.	"At First Sight, At a Glance" (Feat. Verbal Jint)	3:54
6.	"I'll Back Off So You Can Live Better" (Feat. Beast's Junhyung)	3:31
7.	"What I Want to Do Once I Have a Lover" (Feat. Rain)	3:21
8.	"Supa Solo" (Feat. Swings)	3:11
9.	"Loving You"	3:26
10.	"There's a Rumor"	3:29
Total length:		34:51

== Chart performance ==
Song	Peak position
Song	Gaon Chart
"Black & White"	1

== Promotion and awards ==
On January 21, 2011, G.NA started her promotion for Black & White on Music Bank.

On 17th and 24 February 2011, G.NA won on the on M! Countdown. On February 25, 2011, she also won her first ever Music Bank for her title song "Black & White". Music portal Dosirak has revealed that G.NA was the #1 best seller in digital sales for February. According to information released by Dosirak on February 27, the album took first in digital sales. Also, G.NA won her first Inkigayo Mutizen on February 27, 2011, marking her grand slam, for winning on all three music programs.
