= Roll Deep (Hyuna song) =

Single by Hyuna featuring Jung Il-hoon

from the EP A+
- Released: August 21, 2015
- Recorded: 2015
- Genre: K-pop; dance; hip hop
- Length: 3:22
- Label: Cube
- Songwriters: Seo Jae-woo; Big Sancho; Son Young-jin; Jung Il-hoon
- Producers: Seo Jae-woo; Big Sancho; Son Young-jin

Hyuna singles chronology
"Red" (2014)	"Roll Deep" (2015)	"How's This?" (2016)

Music video
- "Roll Deep" on YouTube

"Roll Deep" (alternatively titled "Because I’m The Best" as well as "Cause I'm God Girl"; Korean: 잘나가서 그래; RR: Jallagaseo geurae) is a song recorded by South Korean singer-songwriter and rapper Hyuna. It serves as the lead single of her fourth extended play, A+, which was released on August 21, 2015. It features guest vocals from South Korean rapper Jung Il-hoon of boy group BtoB.

Commercially, "Roll Deep" peaked at number 13 on the Gaon Digital Chart and at number 3 on the US World Digital Song Sales chart. By the end of 2015, the song received over 467,000 digital downloads in the country.

== Music video ==
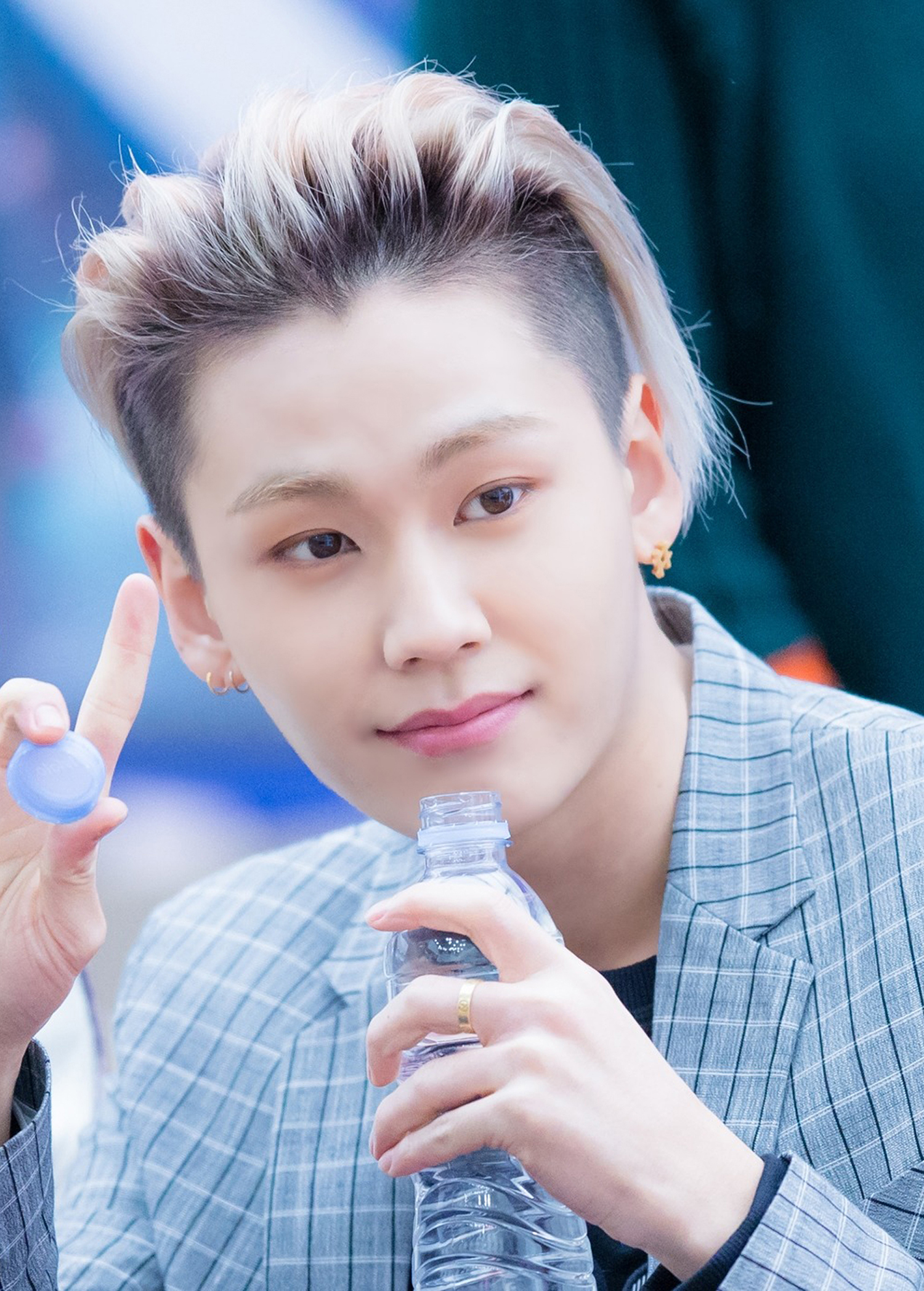
"Roll Deep" features guest vocals and songwriting from Ilhoon of BtoB.

On August 20, the music video for "Roll Deep" was released via the 4Minute YouTube channel, followed by a racier 19+ version of the video deemed the "Original Version" on September 6.

== Critical reception ==
"Roll Deep" received mixed reviews from music critics. Billboard contributor Jeff Benjamin praised "Roll Deep", saying "HyunA confidently raps and chants about her swag, making playful remarks about how even her friends are jealous of her because, well, she's the best. Ilhoon [...] drops in to further the claims as the two spit over hard-hitting, synth-heavy hip-hop production with elements recalling recent work from Mike Will Made It and DJ Mustard." Benjamin also highlighted the styling and aesthetic of the track's music video, citing its "tongue-in-cheek presentation" as proof of the opinion that "HyunA is easily one of the baddest females in K-pop." Conversely, critic Jeon Min-seok from IZM was unfavorable towards the track, calling it rustic and lacking, and referred to the rap as sloppy.

== Commercial performance ==
"Roll Deep" debuted at number 32 on the Gaon Digital Chart, on the chart issue dated August 16–22, 2015, with 80,086 downloads sold and 843,443 streams for its first two days. In its second week, the song peaked at number 13, with 107,723 downloads sold and 2,599,263 streams in its first full week. The song charted for nine consecutive weeks in the Top 100 of the chart. The song also debuted at number 3 on the US World Digital Songs on the week ending October 10, 2015.

The song also debuted at number 44 on the Gaon Digital Chart for the month of August 2015 with 204,221 downloads sold and 4,136,163 streams. The song peaked at number 26 for the month of September 2015 with 154,775 downloads sold and 7,991,584 streams. The song placed at number 100 for the month of October 2015 solely for its 3,528,014 streams.

== Accolades ==
Awards and nominations
Year	Organization	Award	Result	Ref.
2015	Mnet Asian Music Awards	UnionPay Song of the Year	Longlisted	
2015	Mnet Asian Music Awards	Best Dance Performance - Solo	Won	

== Charts ==
Weekly charts
Chart (2015)	Peak position
South Korea (Gaon)	13
US World Digital Songs (Billboard)	3
