= Eternal Rain =

Studio album by Rain
- Released: September 13, 2006
- Recorded: 2005–2006
- Genres: J-pop, R&B, Hip hop
- Length: 46:17
- Language: Japanese
- Label: King Records
- Producers: Park Jin-young, Bang Si-hyuk, Uta, Ryosuke Imai

Rain chronology
| It's Raining (2004) | Eternal Rain (2006) | Rain's World (2006) |

Singles from It's Raining
- 1. "Sad Tango" Released: January 25, 2006; 2. "Free Way" Released: June 7, 2006; 3. "Move On" Released: September 6, 2006

Eternal Rain is the debut Japanese studio album by South Korean pop and R&B singer Rain, released through King Records Japan on September 13, 2006. The album allowed for Rain to expand into the Japanese market after the success of It's Raining. It charted moderately in Japan, peaking at number 14 on the Oricon Albums Chart.

== Overview ==
The album was released in three editions: CD only, CD+DVD and CD+DVD with a T-shirt. Commercially, Eternal Rain peaked at number 14 on the Oricon Albums Chart in Japan in the week of September 25, 2006, and charted for a total of 5 weeks. In Taiwan, the album peaked at number six on the G-Music Combo Albums chart and number one on the G-Music East Asia Albums chart.

== Track listing ==
| No. | Title | Lyrics | Music | Arrangement | Length |
|---|---|---|---|---|---|
| 1. | "Free Way" | Yu Misaki | Uta, Ryosuke Imai | | 3:48 |
| 2. | "Sad Tango" | Yu Misaki, Park Jin-young, Bang Si-hyuk | Park Jin-young, Bang Si-hyuk | Park Jin-young | 4:01 |
| 3. | "Oh Yeah" (featuring Ai) | | | | 3:35 |
| 4. | "Move On" | Yu Misaki, Park Jin-young, Bang Si-hyuk | Park Jin-young, Bang Si-hyuk | Tae Kwon | 4:25 |
| 5. | "Baby Baby" | LL Brothers, Michico | LL Brothers, Michico, T. Kura | | 3:40 |
| 6. | "Feel So Right" | Yu Misaki, Park Jin-young | Park Jin-young | Park Jin-young | 3:47 |
| 7. | "Boku Ga Atsuku Nari Sugite (僕が熱くなりすぎて)" | Brian Kim | JnG Beat | JnG Beat | 4:00 |
| 8. | "Without You" | Yu Misaki | Uta, Ryosuke Imai | Uta | 4:29 |
| 9. | "Because of You" | Park Jin-young | Park Jin-young, Tae Kwon | | 4:47 |
| 10. | "Props in My Life" | Yu Misaki | Ryosuke Imai, Uta | Uta | 4:53 |
| 11. | "Sad Tango" (English version) | Park Jin-young, Bang Si-hyuk | Park Jin-young, Bang Si-hyuk | | 4:01 |
| 12. | "Free Way" (STY Gin n' Tonic Remix) | Yu Misaki | Uta, Ryosuke Imai | | 4:26 |
| Total length: | | | | | 46:17 |

== Charts ==
| Chart (2006) | Peak position |
|---|---|
| Japanese Albums (Oricon) | 14 |
| Taiwanese Albums (G-Music) | 6 |
| Taiwanese J-pop Albums (G-Music) | 1 |

== Sales ==
| Region | Certification | Certified units/sales |
|---|---|---|
| Japan | — | 19,000 |
