= Free Way =

Single by Rain

from the album Eternal Rain
- B-side: "Feels So Right"
- Released: June 7, 2006
- Recorded: 2006
- Genre: J-pop
- Length: 4:05
- Label: King Records
- Producers: Ryosuke Imai, UTA

Rain singles chronology
"Sad Tango" (2006)	"Free Way" (2006)	"Move On" (2006)

"Free Way" was the second Japanese single taken from the forthcoming debut Eternal Rain, from Korean singer, Rain. The single was released on June 7, 2006, throughout Japan, it peaked at the 15th position on the Oricon Charts. Free Way is often compared to the single, Rock Your Body by American singer Justin Timberlake. Many reasons for this are the music video similarities and the disco/funk melodies featured in the song.

== Music video ==
In the video for Free Way, we see singer Rain dancing in a dark black room with what appears to be television screens displaying an assorted collection of colorful holograms. The screens continue to change while Rain and his dancers dance around the area. Throughout the video a total of two outfit changes take place, the first outfit being of all white and the second being of all black.

== Track listing ==
CD Single

1. Free Way
2. Feel So Right
3. Free Way [Instrumental Version]
4. Feel So Right [Instrumental Version]

DVD Single Disc 1

1. Free Way - Music Video
2. Making of Free Way

DVD Single Disc 2

1. Free Way
2. Feel So Right
3. Free Way [Instrumental Version]
4. Feel So Right [Instrumental Version]

== Charts ==
Chart (2006)	Peak position
Oricon Top 200 Weekly	15
Oricon Year-End Singles Chart	478

Sales: 17,005
