= Bubble Pop! (song) =

Single by Hyuna

from the album Bubble Pop!
- Released: July 5, 2011
- Recorded: 2011
- Studio: TS Music Studio (Seoul, South Korea)
- Genre: K-pop; dance
- Length: 3:33
- Label: Cube
- Songwriters: Shinsadong Tiger; Choi Kyu-sung

Hyuna singles chronology
"A Bitter Day" (2011)	"Bubble Pop!" (2011)	"Oppa Is Just My Style" (2012)

Music video
- "Bubble Pop" on YouTube

"Bubble Pop!" is a song recorded by South Korean singer Hyuna for her debut extended play Bubble Pop! (2011). It was released as the title track from the EP by Cube Entertainment and Universal Music on July 5, 2011. The lyrics were written by Shinsadong Tiger and Choi Kyusung, who also composed the music. To promote the song and EP, Hyuna appeared on several South Korean music programs, including Music Bank, Show! Music Core and Inkigayo. A music video for the song was released on July 4 and has surpassed 100 million views on YouTube, making her the first female Korean solo artist to reach this milestone.

The single peaked at number 4 on the Gaon Digital Chart in its weekly issue and at number 6 in its monthly issue. The song also charted at number 40 for the year-end chart.

== Background and release ==
On June 26, 2011, Cube Entertainment confirmed that Hyuna would make her comeback on July with a new mini-album. They revealed, "The title track is an upgraded version of HyunA’s usual style. We’ll be promoting a track with a heavy beat that emphasizes HyunA’s powerful performance style." The song was released digitally and on the EPs Bubble Pop! on July 5, 2011.

On July 11, 2011, Hyuna released the practice video for "Bubble Pop".

== Commercial performance ==
"Bubble Pop!" was a commercial success. The song entered at number 11 on the Gaon Digital Chart on the chart issue dated July 3–9, 2011 with 582,760 downloads sold and 1,131,218 streams. In its second week, the song peaked at number 4 on the chart with 464,258 downloads sold and 1,618,604 streams. The song stayed in the Top 10 of the chart for two consecutive weeks and a total of eleven consecutive weeks in the Top 100 on the chart. The song peaked at number 6 on the Gaon Digital Chart for the month of July 2011. In the month of August the song placed at number 26, while in the month of September placed at number 78 . "Bubble Pop!" placed at number 40 on the Gaon Digital Chart 2011 year-end chart.

== Music video and promotion ==
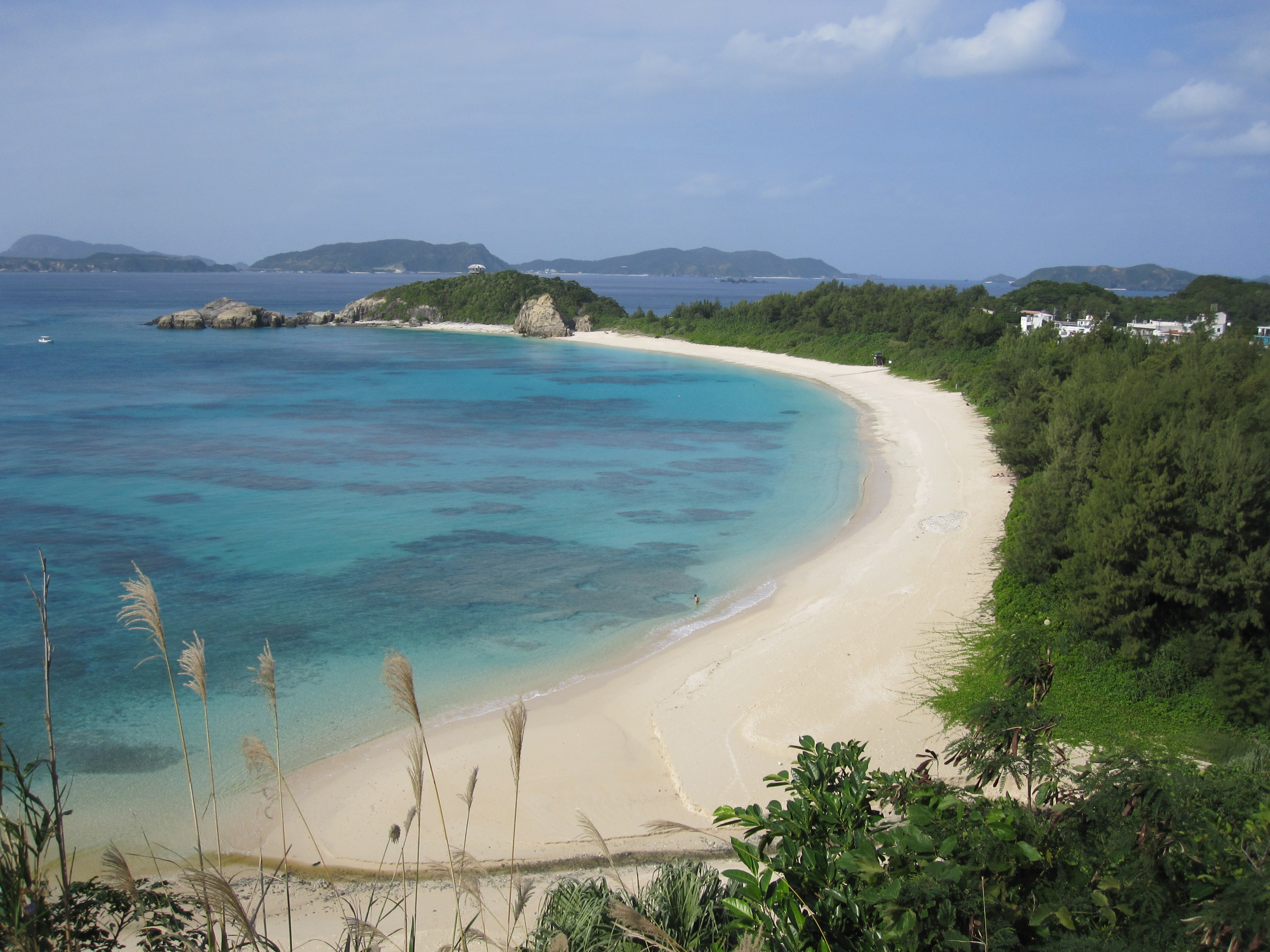
The music video for "Bubble Pop!" was filmed in Okinawa, Japan.

On June 30, 2011, the music video teaser for "Bubble Pop" was released. The video was filmed mid-June in Okinawa, Japan, and was officially released on July 4, 2011. The music video features a short cameo from Lee Joon from MBLAQ. The music video made Hyuna the first Korean female solo singer to reach more than 100 million views on a single YouTube video. Hyuna promoted the title track "Bubble Pop!" on music shows from July 8, 2011, on KBS's Music Bank, MBC's Show! Music Core, SBS's Inkigayo and Mnet's M! Countdown.

== In popular culture ==
The song is also featured in the 2017 dance video game Just Dance 2018. In 2016, the song was parodied in the Family Guy episode "Candy, Quahog Marshmallow".

== Accolades ==
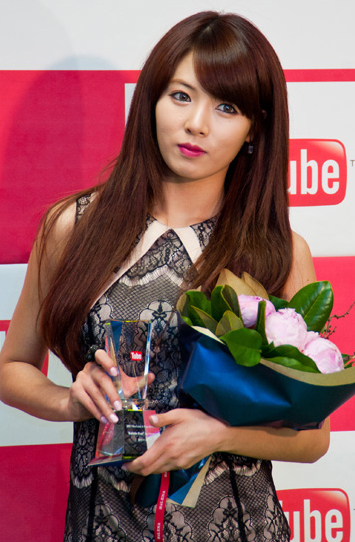
Hyuna at the YouTube K-pop Awards, where she won the Popularity Video Award

Awards for "Bubble Pop"
Year	Organization	Award	Result	Ref.
2011	Mnet Asian Music Awards	Best Dance Performance – Solo	Won	
2011	YouTube K-pop Awards	Popularity Video Award	Won	

"Bubble Pop!" on listicles
Publication	List	Rank	Ref.
Billboard	100 Greatest K-Pop Songs of the 2010s	44	
Edge Media	2011's Top 10 K-pop Songs	1	
Melon	Top 100 K-pop Songs of All Time	43	
Rolling Stone	100 Greatest Songs in the History of Korean Pop Music	26	
Stereogum	20 Best K-Pop Videos	8	
Spin	21 Greatest K-Pop Songs of All Time	2	
Spin	Spin's Favorite Pop Tracks of 2011	3	

== Credits and personnel ==
- Hyuna – vocals, rap
- Shinsadong Tiger — producing, songwriting, arranger, music
- Choi Kyu-sung – producing, songwriting, arranger, music

== Charts ==
=== Weekly charts ===
Chart (2011)	Peak position
South Korea (Gaon)	4
South Korea (K-pop Hot 100)	9
US World Digital Songs (Billboard)	10

=== Monthly charts ===
Chart (July 2011)	Peak position
South Korea (Gaon)	6

=== Year-end charts ===
Chart (2011)	Position
South Korea (Gaon)	40
