= A Bitter Day =

Single by Hyuna featuring Yong Jun-hyung and G.NA

from the album Bubble Pop!
- Released: June 30, 2011
- Recorded: 2011
- Genre: K-pop; R&B
- Length: 3:47
- Label: Cube; Universal Music
- Songwriters: Choi Kyu-sung; Yong Jun-hyung
- Producer: Choi Kyu-sung

Hyuna featuring Yong Jun-hyung and G.NA singles chronology
"Change" (2010)	"A Bitter Day" (2011)	"Bubble Pop!" (2011)

Music video
- "A Bitter Day" on YouTube

"A Bitter Day" is a song recorded by South Korean singer Hyuna featuring Yong Jun-hyung and G.NA for her debut extended play Bubble Pop! (2011). It was released as the lead single from the EP by Cube Entertainment and Universal Music on June 30, 2011.

== Composition ==
The lyrics were written by Choi Kyu-sung and Yong Jun-hyung.

== Release ==
On June 29, it was announced that Hyuna would be releasing a digital single, the only ballad song from her debut EP Bubble Pop!. The single, which features Cube Entertainment label-mates G.NA and BEAST's Yong Jun-hyung was released on June 30, 2011.

== Credits and personnel ==
Credits adapted from Melon.

- Hyuna – vocals, rapping
- Yong Jun-hyung – rapping, songwriting
- G.NA – vocals
- Choi Kyu-sung – songwriting, producer

== Chart performance ==
The song debuted at number 10 on the South Korean Gaon Digital Chart.

== Charts ==
Chart (2011)	Peak position
South Korea (Gaon)	10

== Release history ==
Region	Date	Format	Label
Various	June 30, 2011	Digital download; streaming	Cube Entertainment; Universal Music
