= The Next Big Thing (EP) =

EP by Roh Ji-hoon
- Released: November 7, 2012
- Recorded: Cube Entertainment, Seoul, South Korea
- Genres: K-pop, R&B
- Length: 14:32
- Labels: Cube Entertainment, LOEN Entertainment

Singles from The Next Big Thing
- 1. "Punishment" Released: November 6, 2012

The Next Big Thing is the debut and first EP by South Korean singer Roh Ji-hoon. The EP was released on November 7, 2012 on iTunes and also in stores by Cube Entertainment and distributed by LOEN Entertainment.

== Background ==
On October 29, 2012, Cube Entertainment announced that “No Ji Hoon will be releasing his first mini album ‘The Next Big Thing‘ and will be raising the curtains for his promotions as a solo dance singer with his title track ‘Being Punished’“. On October 31, 2012, Cube Entertainment released a mock-documentary style video teaser of the singer titled ‘Mockumentary – File Code: 1107‘ onto their official YouTube channel featuring labelmates Hyuna, G.NA and BtoB. Ailee also made an appearance towards the end of the video. A second video teaser was released on November 5, 2012 and on November 6, 2012 jacket images and music video for the title track "Punishment" was also released followed by the release of the mini album both digitally and physically on the next day.

== Composition ==
The tracks for the EP was produced by Kang Dong Chul also known as the Brave Brothers who has produced hit songs for Son Dam Bi, Big Bang, Brown Eyed Girls, After School, T-ara and Sistar. The EP opens with an introduction titled “Fly With Me,” which is surprisingly light compared with some of the introductions Brave Brothers has produced previously. In the title song "Punishment" piano chords in the background of the song move the song along at a nice pace and the lyrics of the song are from the point of view of a man who has dumped his girlfriend, but regrets it because memories of her keep coming back to haunt him in his current relationship, which he calls his “punishment.”. The third track “Raining,” a sweet ballad that has a touch of R&B which features Maboos, a member of Electroboyz. The fourth track titled “Maker" featuring labemate Hyuna of 4Minute brings energy and life to the mini-album with a faster beat and a more electronic sound and the last track in the EP titled “How Is It” is an upbeat pop ballad.

== Music video ==
=== ‘Mockumentary – File Code:1107′ ===
In the first teaser, fellow labelmates HyunA, G.NA, and BTOB make an appearance with the BTOB members being sent on a search to find the whereabouts of Noh Ji Hoon, who is made out to be quite a womanizer through this teaser as the girls describe him as a guy who seems to know just exactly what to do and know exactly what they're thinking. Ailee also makes an appearance towards the end as one of Noh Ji Hoon's many girls.

=== Second video teaser ‘Punishment‘ ===
In the second teaser, Noh Ji Hoon is tied and blindfolded to a chair and a beautiful lady visits him, eventually removing the blindfold which portrays him as being punished as in the first video teaser Roh Ji Hoon, who is made out to be quite a womanizer.

=== Music video ===
The main male has trouble forgetting his last love, which causes trouble for him in any new relationship he intends to have. Since he was the one who ended that relationship he can't forget, he feels he's being punished for making the wrong choice, hence the song title. The music video portrays the man and woman passing by each other, which incites the man to follow the woman, the very one he can't get out of his mind. She's clearly aware of his following her, even stopping and watching him look for her at one point, leaving right as he notices her. They finally meet in an elevator, share a kiss, and then the man sitting in a room, blindfolded and with hands bound behind him. The woman teasingly removes the blindfold, leaving the man behind, both of them with small smiles on their faces.

The music video takes physical associations with punishment–blindfolds and bound hands–and ties them to the mental form of it, from the actions of the man, it seems he's rather into this game the two are playing, hoping for some type of reunion. He's naturally drawn to the woman, seeks her out by compulsion, adding to the punishment he feels The woman is harder to read; she's either interested in him or in making him suffer. But rather than following a strictly logical plot line, the music video was more focused on visualizing the sentiments presented in the lyrics. The man feels like he sees this woman everywhere because of the extent to which he wants to return to that previous relationship. But all those memories end in his punishment and lack of the one he wants.

== Promotion ==
Before the release of the EP, Cube Entertainment has already started promoting the EP with buses wrapped with Roh Ji-hoon's photos as well as the release details of the EP. Following the release of the EP, Roh Ji-hoon made his debut performance on M! Countdown on November 8, 2012 and also other music shows to promote his title track "Punishment" and the EP.

== Track list ==
All tracks are written by Brave Brothers

No.	Title	Writer(s)	Arrangement	Length
1.	"Fly with Me"	Brave Brothers	Mr. kang	1:21
2.	"Punishment" (벌 받나 봐; Beol Badna Bwa)		Brave Brothers, ddorai park, elephant kingdom	3:15
3.	"It's Raining" (비가 와; Biga Wa) (feat. Maboos)		Kang jung hoon	3:14
4.	"Maker" (feat. Hyuna of 4minute)		Deez	3:16
5.	"Be My Girl" (어때요; Eottaeyo)		Kim jinhwan	3:26
Total length:				13:32

== Charts ==
=== Album chart ===
Chart	Peak position
Gaon Weekly Album Chart	16

=== Singles ===
Year	Title	Peak positions	
Year	Title	KOR Gaon	KOR Billboard
2012	"벌 받나 봐 (Punishment)"	117	-
"—" denotes releases that did not chart or were not released in that region.

== Release history ==
Country	Date	Distributing label	Format
South Korea	November 7, 2012	Cube Entertainment, LOEN Entertainment	CD, Digital download
Worldwide	November 7, 2012	Cube Entertainment, LOEN Entertainment	CD, iTunes Store
