= Bubble Pop! =

EP by Hyuna
- Released: July 5, 2011
- Recorded: June 2011
- Genre: K-pop; R&B; hip hop
- Length: 15:34
- Label: Cube

Hyuna chronology
Bubble Pop! (2011)	Melting (2012)

Singles from Bubble Pop!
- 1. "A Bitter Day" Released: June 30, 2011; 2. "Bubble Pop!" Released: July 5, 2011; 3. "Just Follow" Released: August 11, 2011

Bubble Pop! is the first extended play (EP) by the South Korean singer Hyuna, a member of South Korean girl group 4Minute. It was released on July 5, 2011, by Cube Entertainment.

== Release and reception ==
On June 30, 2011, the lead single, "A Bitter Day", was released digitally. It featured the guest singer G.NA in the chorus and rapping by Yong Jun-hyung of Beast. It was co-written by Yong and Choi Kyu-sung. The song peaked at number 10 on the Gaon Weekly Digital Chart and at number 165 on the Gaon Year-End Digital Chart for 2011.

On July 5, 2011, the EP's title track, "Bubble Pop!", and its music video were released. The music video has a cameo by MBLAQ's Lee Joon. It was filmed in Okinawa, Japan. Hyuna promoted the song on music shows from July 8, 2011, on KBS's Music Bank, MBC's Show! Music Core, SBS's Inkigayo and Mnet's M! Countdown. The song reached number 4 on the Gaon Weekly Digital Chart and finished at number 21 on Gaon's 2011 year-end chart. It has sold 2,694,310 digital copies.

On December 9, 2011, the title track "Bubble Pop!" ranked at #9 on the American music magazine Spin's "20 Best Songs of 2011" list.

The song was parodied in the 2016 Family Guy episode "Candy, Quahog Marshmallow!".

The song appears in the 2017 dance video game Just Dance 2018 as a song on the tracklist.

== Promotion and controversy ==
Hyuna promoted the title track "Bubble Pop!" on music shows in July 2011. The EP's introduction song "Attention" was also used in the performances.

In August, Cube Entertainment halted promotions because the title track's video, choreography and on-stage costumes were deemed by the Korea Communications Commission (KCC) to be "too sexually suggestive". Cube Entertainment decided to promote the follow-up single, "Just Follow", featuring the rapper Dok2. Hyuna's performance on the Inkigayo music show featured the rapper Zico from the boy band Block B instead, and with lyrics that he re-wrote.

== Track listing ==
Bubble Pop!
No.	Title	Lyrics	Music	Length
1.	"Attention"	Beomi, Nangi	Beomi, Nangi	1:26
2.	"Bubble Pop!"	Shinsadong Tiger, Choi Kyu-sung	Shinsadong Tiger, Choi Kyu-sung	3:33
3.	"Downtown" (feat. Jeon Ji-yoon)	Shinsadong Tiger, Choi Kyu-sung	Shinsadong Tiger, Choi Kyu-sung	3:23
4.	"A Bitter Day" (feat. Yong Jun-hyung & G.NA)	Choi Kyu-sung, Yong Jun-hyung	Choi Kyu-sung	3:47
5.	"Just Follow" (feat. Dok2)	Dok2	Dok2	3:25
Total length:				15:35

== Chart performance ==
Chart	Peak position
Gaon Weekly albums chart	7
Gaon Monthly albums chart	13

== Release history ==
Country	Date	Format	Label
South, Korea	July 5, 2011	CD	Cube Entertainment
