= Sad Tango =

Single by Rain

from the album Eternal Rain
- B-side: "Slowly"
- Released: January 25, 2006
- Genre: J-pop, R&B, Tango
- Length: 4:03
- Label: King Records
- Songwriters: Park Jin-young, Bang Si-hyuk
- Producer: Park Jin-young

Rain singles chronology
"Sad Tango" (2006)	"Free Way" (2006)

"Sad Tango" marks Rain's (or ピ in Japanese) debut single throughout Japan. The single experiments with Latin style melodies tied with modern RNB beats. The single was released on January 25, 2006 and entered the official Japanese Music Charts (Oricon) at number fourteen. The single was released in two formats, a CD Single and a CD/DVD single, and included the R&B ballad Slowly as a b-side.

== Music video ==
In the music video for Sad Tango, we follow the mysterious, dark figure of Rain entering a parking lot on his motorcycle after a white car. This is revealed to be the car of a young woman, who Rain follows into a club-like arena. The scene swiftly changes to a lit-up dance floor, on which Rain and his dancers are on. The music begins, and Rain is soon singing. The video alternates between Rain on the dance floor and him following the mysterious girl through the club.

== Track listing ==
CD Single

1. Sad Tango
2. Slowly
3. Sad Tango [Instrumental Version]
4. Slowly [Instrumental Version]

DVD Single Disc 1

1. Sad Tango - Music Video
2. Making of Sad Tango

DVD Single Disc 2

1. Sad Tango
2. Slowly
3. Sad Tango [Instrumental Version]
4. Slowly [Instrumental Version]

== Charts ==
Chart (2006)	Peak position
Oricon Top 200 Weekly	14
Oricon Year-End Singles Chart	333
SoundScan Japan Singles Chart Top 20	none
J-WAVE Tokio Hot 100	none

Sales: 25,748
