= Draw G's First Breath =

EP by G.NA
- Released: July 14, 2010
- Recorded: 2010
- Genre: K-pop; R&B
- Length: 17:24
- Language: Korean
- Label: Cube; Universal Music

G.NA chronology
Draw G's First Breath (2010)	Black & White (2011)

Singles from Draw G's First Breath
- 1. "Thing I'd Like to Do With My Lover" Released: July 5, 2010; 2. "I'll Back Off So You Can Live Better" Released: July 14, 2010; 3. "Supa' Solo" Released: August 2010

Draw G's First Breath is the debut extended play by Canadian-South Korean singer G.NA. It was released by Cube Entertainment on July 14, 2010. Kim Do-hoon, Shinsadong Tiger, Jung Ji-chan, and Kang Ji-won all participated in this album.

== Background ==
G.NA was one of the most-anticipated female solo acts, and as such, the line-up for the production was impressive. Kim Do-hoon, Shinsadong Tiger, Jung Ji-chan, Kang Ji-won, and other great staff participated in her album, and the tracks they released have received praise. G.NA's debut music video, "Kkeojyeo Julge Jal Sara" (꺼져 줄게 잘 살아, lit. "I'll Back Off So You Can Live Better"), featured Beast's Yoon Doo-joon as the male actor, as well as Yong Jun-hyung's rapping. Before her on-air debut on the music show, she was congratulated by her former Five Girls members Hyosung, Uee and Yubin through pre-recorded footage. The music video for G.NA's title track "꺼져 줄게 잘 살아 I'll Back Off So You Can Live Better" was uploaded on her official YouTube channel a day before the release of the EP.

== Promotion and awards ==
G.NA promoted her title track, "Kkeojyeo Julge Jal Sara" on various music programs such as M! Countdown, Music Bank and Music Core. She won her first award on M! Countdown on 12 August 2010. After finishing her promotions on "Kkeojyeo Julge Jal Sara", she chose to promote "Supa Solo", as her following track but the song did not win any awards. All five tracks were later released again on her first full-length album, Black & White.

== Track listing ==
No.	Title	Lyrics	Music	Length
1.	"꺼져 줄게 잘 살아 (ft. 용준형)" ('I'll Back Off So You Can Live Better (ft. Yong Jun-hyung)")	Wheesung	Kim Do-hoon	3:34
2.	"애인이 생기면 하고 싶은 일 (ft. 비)" ("Thing I'd Like to Do With My Lover (Featuring Rain)")	Kang Eunkyung	Kim Do-hoon	3:24
3.	"Supa Solo (ft. Swings)"	Wheesung	Kim Do-hoon, Shinsadong Tiger	3:15
4.	"Loving You"			3:30
5.	"소문났어요" ("There's A Rumor")	Yoon Sara	Kim Do-hoon, Kang Ji-won	3:31
Total length:				17:02

"I'll Back Off So You Can Live Better (Feat. Yong Junhyung)" was G.NA's debut single.
