= Chinese Music Charts =

Record chart

Chinese Music Charts (Chinese: 华语音乐排行榜) is a Mandopop record chart established by Chinese Musicians Association, Chinese Radio Union, HUAYINSHENGSHI, and music newspaper Musiclife.
