= Move On (Rain song) =

Single by Rain

from the album Eternal Rain
- B-side: "Up in the Club"
- Released: September 6, 2006
- Recorded: 2006
- Genre: J-pop
- Length: 4:24
- Label: King Records
- Composers: J.Y.Park, "hitman"bang
- Lyricists: Yu Misaki, J.Y.Park, "hitman"bang
- Producers: Park Jin-young, Kwon Tae-eun

Rain singles chronology
"Free Way" (2006)	"Move On" (2006)

"Move On" is the third Japanese single from Rain.

== Music video ==
Rain is shown first sitting in an armchair in a dark room that resembles an apartment and singing. Then he gets up towards the end of the music video and starts walking around the building that he is in, dancing and singing at the same time.

== Track listing ==
Disk 1

1. Move On
2. Up in the Club
3. Move On (instrumental)
4. Up in the Club (instrumental)

DVD

1. "Move On" PV
2. "Move On" PV Making
3. Interview

== Charts ==
Chart (2006)	Peak position
Oricon Top 200 Weekly	17
Oricon Year-End Singles Chart	673

Sales: 10,584
