= Red (Hyuna song) =

Single by Hyuna

from the album A Talk
- Released: July 28, 2014
- Recorded: June 11, 2014
- Genre: K-pop; EDM
- Length: 3:19
- Label: Cube
- Songwriters: Seo Jae-woo; BlueSun; Socrates
- Producers: Seo Jae-woo; Kim Tae-ho

Hyuna singles chronology
"Ice Cream" (2012)	"Red" (2014)	"Roll Deep" (2015)

Music video
- "Red" on YouTube

"Red" (stylized in all caps; Korean: 빨개요; RR: Ppalgaeyo) is a song recorded by South Korean singer-songwriter Hyuna from her third extended play, A Talk. The song was released on July 28, 2014.

== Reception ==
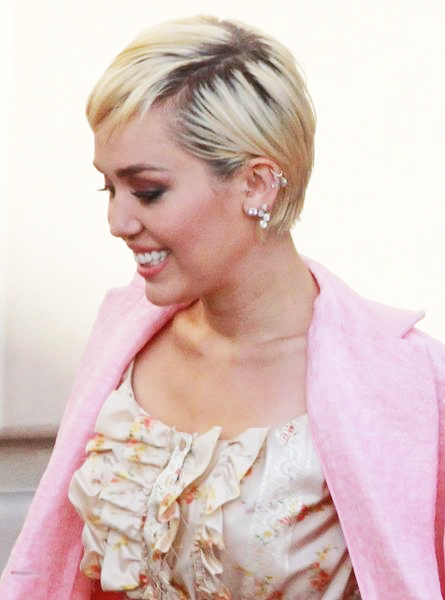
AXS compared the song's styles to works of American singer Miley Cyrus.

The single "Red" reached number 3 on the Gaon Weekly Digital Chart. On August 6, 2014, Hyuna won her first ever music show award on MBC Music's Show Champion for "Red", and won on the same show again the following week.

Despite calling "Red" "fifty shades of messy," Lucas Villa of AXS praised Hyuna for delivering a "club banger that would make Miley proud." Rolling Stone named "Red" number 5 on their year-end list of the top ten music videos of 2014. "Red" ranked number 1 on Chinese Music Charts for four consecutive days, and has made it to the No. 1 spot on Taiwan's music charts.

== Awards and nominations ==
Awards and nominations
Year	Organization	Award	Result	Ref.
2014	Golden Disk Awards	Digital Bonsang	Won	
2014	Mnet Asian Music Award	Song of the Year	Nominated	
2014	Mnet Asian Music Award	Best Dance Performance - Solo	Nominated	
2014	Seoul Music Awards	Dance Performance Award	Won	

Music program awards
Program	Date	Ref.
Show Champion (MBC)	August 6, 2014	
Show Champion (MBC)	August 13, 2014	

== Charts and sales ==
=== Weekly charts ===
Chart (2014)	Peak position
South Korea (Gaon)	3
US World Digital Songs (Billboard)	5

=== Monthly charts ===
Chart (August 2014)	Peak position
South Korea (Gaon)	8

=== Year-end Chart ===
Chart (2014)	Peak position
South Korea (Gaon)	78

=== Sales ===
Country	Sales (2014)
South Korea (digital single)	685,761
