= Jung Il-hoon =

South Korean rapper (born 1994)

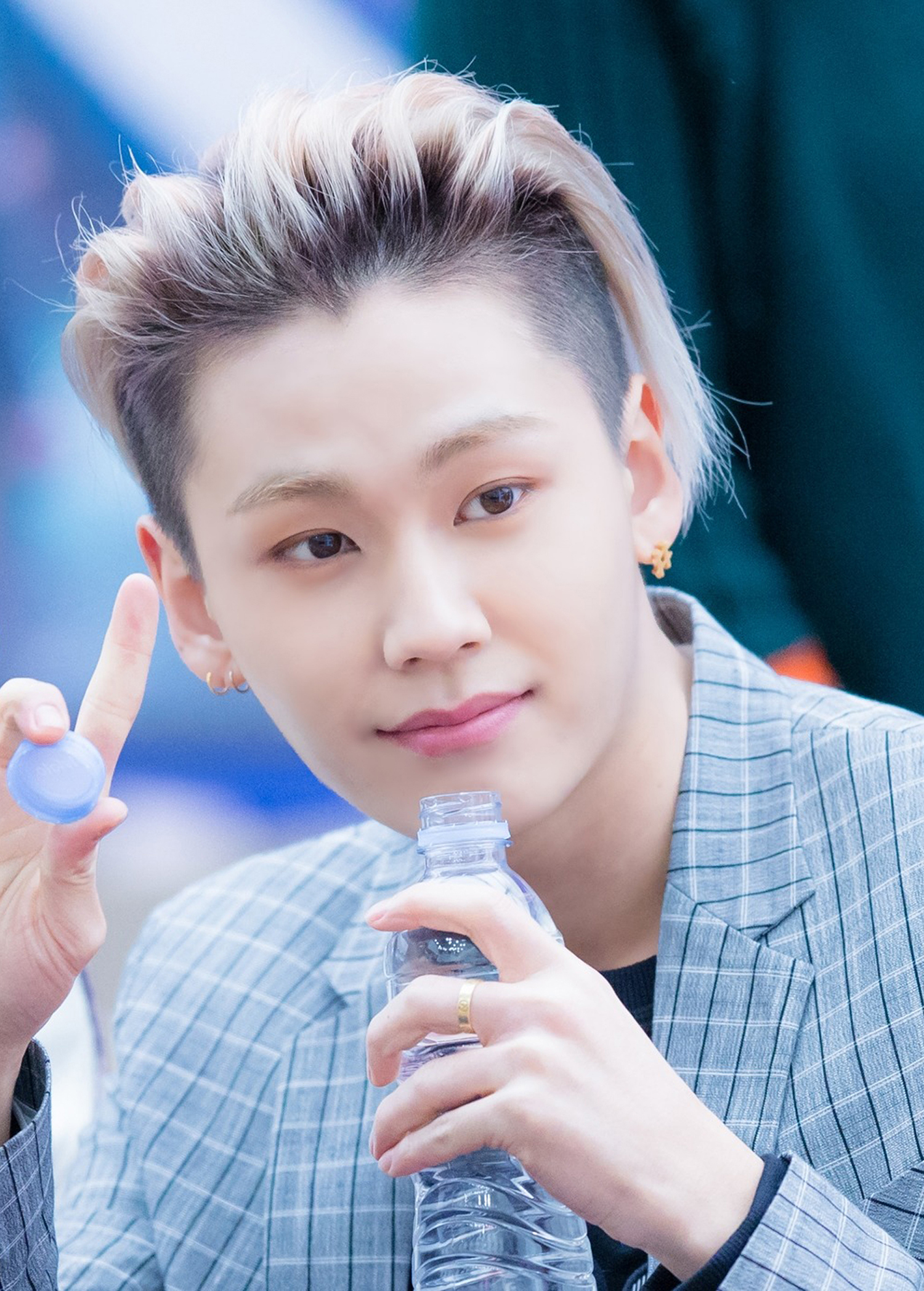
- Jung at a fansign in November 2016
- Born: October 4, 1994 (age 31); Seoul, South Korea
- Occupations: Rapper; singer; songwriter; record producer; actor
- Relatives: Joo (Sister)
- Musical career
- Genres: K-pop; hip hop
- Years active: 2010–2020; 2024–present
- Labels: Carpenterz Art Republic; Cube
- Formerly of: BtoB; United Cube
- Website: btobofficial.com

Korean name
- Hangul: 정일훈
- Hanja: 鄭鎰勳
- RR: Jeong Ilhun
- MR: Chŏng Irhun

Signature
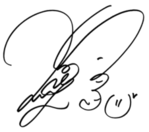

Jung Il-hoon (Korean: 정일훈; born October 4, 1994), simply known as Ilhoon or Illhoon, is a South Korean rapper, singer, songwriter, record producer, and actor. He was a rapper in the South Korean boy band BtoB. He is well known for his collaborations with artists such as Hyuna and G.NA, as well as for being an assistant MC on the variety show Weekly Idol. Ilhoon made his acting debut starring in the drama Webtoon Hero: Tundra Show in 2015. He was also known for popularising the gestures for "Gwiyomi Player", later confirming that he was taught them by Yujin when she was a trainee.

== Early life and education ==
Jung Il-hoon was born on October 4, 1994, in Seoul, South Korea. He graduated from Hanlim Multi Art School and attended Korea College of Media Arts with acting course. He is the younger brother of singer Joo.

== Career ==
=== 2010–2011: Pre-debut ===
As a trainee Jung had filled in for labelmate Yong Jun-hyung during some of G.NA's promotions for "I'll Back Off So You Can Live Better" on music shows, in 2010. In 2011, Jung, along with four other members of BtoB's initial lineup, made his acting debut in the JTBC sitcom, I Live in Cheongdam Dong.

=== 2012–2016: Debut in BtoB and early career ===
Jung debuted as the main rapper of the boy group BtoB in 2012. The group made their official debut on Mnet's M! Countdown on March 21.

From 2012 to 2016, Jung was featured as a regular guest together with Apink's Bomi on the music variety show Weekly Idol. He collaborated with 4Minute's Gayoon with the song "My Love By My Side" for the musical of the same name. He also featured in Hyuna's "Unripe Apple" which was a track from her second EP, Melting.

In 2013, he was featured in 2YOON's Harvest Moon EP for the track "Nightmare". He later collaborated with G.NA for her lead single, "Oops!", off the Beautiful Kisses EP.

In 2015, Jung starred in the web-drama, Webtoon Hero: Tundra Show as Kim Sung-min. Later that year, Cube Entertainment announced Hyuna's lead single for A+, titled "Roll Deep" (Because I'm the Best), would feature Jung. He also participated in the making of the album. He was only able to perform with Hyuna twice as there was a conflict with other BtoB schedules, and was covered by Cube Entertainment's trainee, Kim Hyo-jong. Later in 2015, Jung featured in Unpretty Rapstar 2's semi-finals episode as he performed with contestant Jiyoon for the track "This Ain't Me".

=== 2017–2020: Solo career beginnings and hiatus ===
On May 24, 2017, it was announced that Jung would be releasing a self-composed track on May 30, as part of BtoB's "Piece of BtoB" solo project. He released "Fancy Shoes", a song that he had previously performed at BtoB's solo concert, BtoB Time 2017.

In September 2017, it was announced Jung would be joining the cast of web-mockumentary (fashioned as a cosmetics reality program), The Cushion, alongside label mate Yoo Seon-ho and Korean beauty YouTuber Lena. All the episodes were uploaded on Naver TV, YouTube and Oksusu from October to November 2017.

On February 12, 2018, it was announced that Jung would be releasing his first solo album in March. The album, titled Big Wave, was released on March 8, containing five tracks which featured fellow BtoB member Hyunsik with the song "Come Closer" and Jinho of Pentagon with the song "Always". The lead single, titled "She's Gone", is a hip-hop song which describes complicated break up feelings. Jung had previously performed the song at BTOB's 2017 BTOB Time - Our Concert, from 23 to 24 December at the Ilsan Kintex Exhibition Center. He participated in writing and composing all songs on the EP. In October, he was featured on the song "Cookies" from F.T. Island's Lee Hong-gi's EP Do n Do.

On February 21, 2019, Jung dropped a digital single, "Spoiler", featuring solo artist Babylon.

Jung departed from BtoB following a drug scandal on December 31, 2020, after being investigated by the Seoul Metropolitan Police Agency for using marijuana in prior years.

=== 2024–present: Return to activities ===
From October 4 to October 6, 2024, Jung held his first solo art exhibition "Tiny Ark" at KIR SEOUL. On November 21, Jung released the digital single, "lullaby", his first release in nearly six years.

== Personal life ==
=== Enlistment ===
Jung enlisted on May 28, 2020, and was serving as a public service worker.

=== Legal issues ===
On December 21, 2020, it was reported that Jung was under investigation by the Seoul Metropolitan Police Agency along with accomplices for purchasing and using cannabis in prior years and that his case had already been handed to prosecution earlier in July. Cube Entertainment announced Jung's departure from BtoB on December 31, 2020.

Jung submitted 2 statements of self-reflection to the court on April 15, 2021, and attended the first hearing on the morning of April 22, 2021. According to the prosecutor's statement, from July 5, 2016, to January 9, 2019, Jung with conspirators remitted 133 million KRW over 161 times, using cryptocurrency, and bought and inhaled 826 g and 20 ml of cannabis. After that, Jung did cannabis without conspirators. Jung admitted all charges.

At the decision hearing on the afternoon of May 20, 2021, the prosecutors sought a 4-year prison sentence and a 133.065 million KRW fine. Jung submitted a letter of reflection to the court on June 8, 2021, and the trial court sentenced Jung to 2 years in prison and a fine of 133 million KRW on the afternoon of June 10, 2021. Jung, who was tried without detention, was arrested in court the same day.

Jung filed an appeal on June 14, 2021 on the basis of misunderstandings of the fact and the law during the initial trial. The prosecution did not file a cross-appeal. The first hearing of the appeal trial was held on the afternoon of September 2, 2021 while the second hearing was on the morning of October 7, 2021. The content of the indictment was partially changed due to the difference in the number of actual purchases and smoking times and the legal misunderstanding about the fine. A huge amount of petitions from fans were also submitted.

The decision hearing that was scheduled to be held on the afternoon of November 4, 2021 was postponed to the afternoon of November 18, 2021 due to the aftermath of the spread of COVID-19. The prosecutors sought a 2-year prison sentence and a lower 126.63 million KRW fine. At the sentencing hearing held on the afternoon of December 16, 2021, the appeal court overturned the judgment of the trial court suspending Jung's 2 years prison sentence with 3 years probation. Jung was also ordered a 40-hour drug treatment and a 126.63 million KRW fine.

According to the court, Jung did not systematically smoke marijuana, and Jung's purchase using cryptocurrency did not appear to be deliberate. Jung seemed to have voluntarily stopped around January 2019 and had since made efforts to prevent recidivism. Jung received psychiatric treatment to quit drugs, took online lectures for addiction treatment, and maintained a strong bond with his family as well as other social ties to keep him straight. Since the start of the appeal trial, Jung submitted 105 statements of self-reflection, and his fans also submitted petitions.

On December 24, 2021, Jung personally apologized for his case through a handwritten letter. The letter was later archived from his Instagram on September 29, 2022.

== Discography ==
=== Studio album ===
Title	Details
The Adam	Released: April 30, 2025; Label: Carpenterz Art Republic; Format: CD, digital download, streaming

=== Extended plays ===
Title	Details	Peak chart positions	Sales
Title	Details	KOR	Sales
Big Wave	Released: March 8, 2018; Label: Cube Entertainment, Kakao M; Format: CD, digital download, streaming; Track listing: 1. Come Closer (얘기 좀 해요) (feat. Hyunsik); 2. Fancy Shoes (멋진 구두) (Remastered); 3. She's Gone; 4. Big Wave; 5. Always (feat. Jinho)	2	KOR: 34,270

=== Songs ===
==== As lead artist ====
List of singles, with selected chart positions, showing year released and album name
Title	Year	Peak chart position		Sales (DL)	Album
Title	Year	KOR	US World	Sales (DL)	Album
"Fancy Shoes"	2017	– (Note: "Fancy Shoes" did not enter the Gaon Digital Chart, but peaked at number 58 on the Gaon Download Chart.)	—	KOR: 27,757	Piece of BtoB Vol.2
"She's Gone"	2018	90	—	—N/a	Big Wave
"Spoiler" (feat. Babylon)	2019	—	—	—N/a	Non-album single
"Lullaby"	2024	—	—	—N/a	The Adam
"moonwalk"	2025	—	—	—N/a	The Adam
"MICHAELANGELO" (미켈란젤로)	2025	—	—	—N/a	The Adam
"Exist" (feat. Yunhway)	2025	—	—	—N/a	Non-album single
"—" denotes releases that did not chart or were not released in that region.

==== Collaborations ====
List of singles, with selected chart positions, showing year released and album name
Title	Year	Peak chart position		Sales (DL)	Album
Title	Year	KOR	US World	Sales (DL)	Album
"My Love By My Side" (with Heo Ga-yoon)	2012	—	—	—N/a	My Love By My Side Musical
"Baesisi" (with Jisook)	2017	—	—	—N/a	Baesisi
"Mermaid" (with Lee Minhyuk, Peniel, Jang Yeeun, Soyeon, and Wooseok)	2018	—	—	—N/a	One

==== As featured artist ====
List of singles, with selected chart positions, showing year released and album name
Title	Year	Peak chart position		Sales (DL)	Album
Title	Year	KOR	US World	Sales (DL)	Album
"Unripe Apple" (Hyuna feat. Jung Il-hoon)	2012	70	—	KOR: 59,729	Melting
"Nightmare" (2YOON feat. Jung Il-hoon)	2013	—	—	KOR: 21,088	Harvest Moon
"Oops!" (G.NA feat. Jung Il-hoon)	2013	13	19	KOR: 470,013	Beautiful Kisses
"Just Pass By" (Subin feat. Jung Il-hoon)	2014	—	—	—N/a	B.B.B
"2Limes" (Inoran feat. Minhyuk, Peniel, Ilhoon)	2015	—	—	—N/a	Beautiful Now
"Roll Deep" (Hyuna feat. Jung Il-hoon)	2015	13	3	KOR: 386,996	A+
"This Ain't Me"	2015	—	—	—N/a	Unpretty Rapstar 2 Semi-Final Part 1
"Wind Clock" (Wax feat. Jung Il-hoon)	2015	—	—	—N/a	Non-album single
"Chamisma" (CLC feat. Jung Il-hoon)	2016	—	—	—N/a	Chamisma
"You Seem Busy" (Melody Day feat. Jung Il-hoon)	2017	—	—	—N/a	KISS ON THE LIPS
"Remember" (Babylon feat. Jung Il-hoon)	2018			—N/a	Non-album single
"One" (Samuel feat. Jung Il-hoon)	2018	—	—		One
"Obvious" (Hwanhee feat. Jung Il-hoon)	2018				Obvious
"Hug Me" (U Sung-eun feat. Jung Il-hoon)	2018				Non-album single
"Cookies" (Lee Hong-gi feat. Jung Il-hoon)	2018				Do n Do
"Door" (NE:ON feat. Jung Il-hoon)	2024				Non-album single
"—" denotes releases that did not chart or were not released in that region.

==== Soundtrack appearances ====
List of singles, with selected chart positions, showing year released and album name
Title	Year	Peak chart position		Sales (DL)	Album
Title	Year	KOR	US World	Sales (DL)	Album
"Bye Bye Love" (with Dongwoon, Yoseob, Changsub)	2013	35	—	KOR: 133,418	When a Man Falls in Love OST
"Goodbye Sadness" (with Changsub, Eunkwang)	2015	—	—	—N/a	Sweet, Savage Family OST
"For You" (with Changsub, Eunkwang, Minhyuk)	2016	—	—	—N/a	Cinderella and Four Knights OST
"It Was Love" (with Bang Min-ah)	2019	–	–		My Absolute Boyfriend OST
"—" denotes releases that did not chart or were not released in that region.

=== Music videos ===
Year	Title	Ref.
2017	"Fancy Shoes (Choreography Practice Video)"	
2018	"She's Gone"	
2018	"Always"	
2018	"Outcast" (Nam Taehyun)	
2019	"Spoiler" ft Babylon	

== Filmography ==
=== Television series ===
Year	Title	Role	Notes	Ref.
2012	I Live in Cheongdam-dong	—N/a	Pre-debut	
2014	The Heirs	Himself	Cameo (Episode 4)	
2015	Webtoon Hero: Tundra Show	Kim Sung-min	Lead role	
2018	Dae Jang Geum Is Watching	RoongD	Cameo (Episode 16)	

=== Variety shows ===
Year	Show	Notes	Ref.
2012–2016	Weekly Idol	Co-host with Apink's Bomi; Regular Guest, Assistant MC	
2017	The Cushion	Main cast with Yoo Seon-ho and Lena	
2018	Idol Room	Co-host with Iz*One's Yujin; Special MC on Episode 31	
2019	Insane Quiz (이세퀴)	Main Host	
2019	KBS Music Shuffle, The Hit	Contestant with Hyunsik and Eddy Kim	
2019	Insane Quiz (이세퀴) Season 2	Main Host	
2019	The Quack Philosophers (개똥이네 철학관)	Main cast with Lee Seung-chul, Kim Jun-hyun and Im Soo-hyang	

=== Radio show ===
Year	Title	Network	Notes	Ref.
2018	Idol Radio	MBC	DJ September 27, 2018 – September 30, 2019	
