= Roh Ji-hoon =

South Korean singer (born 1990)

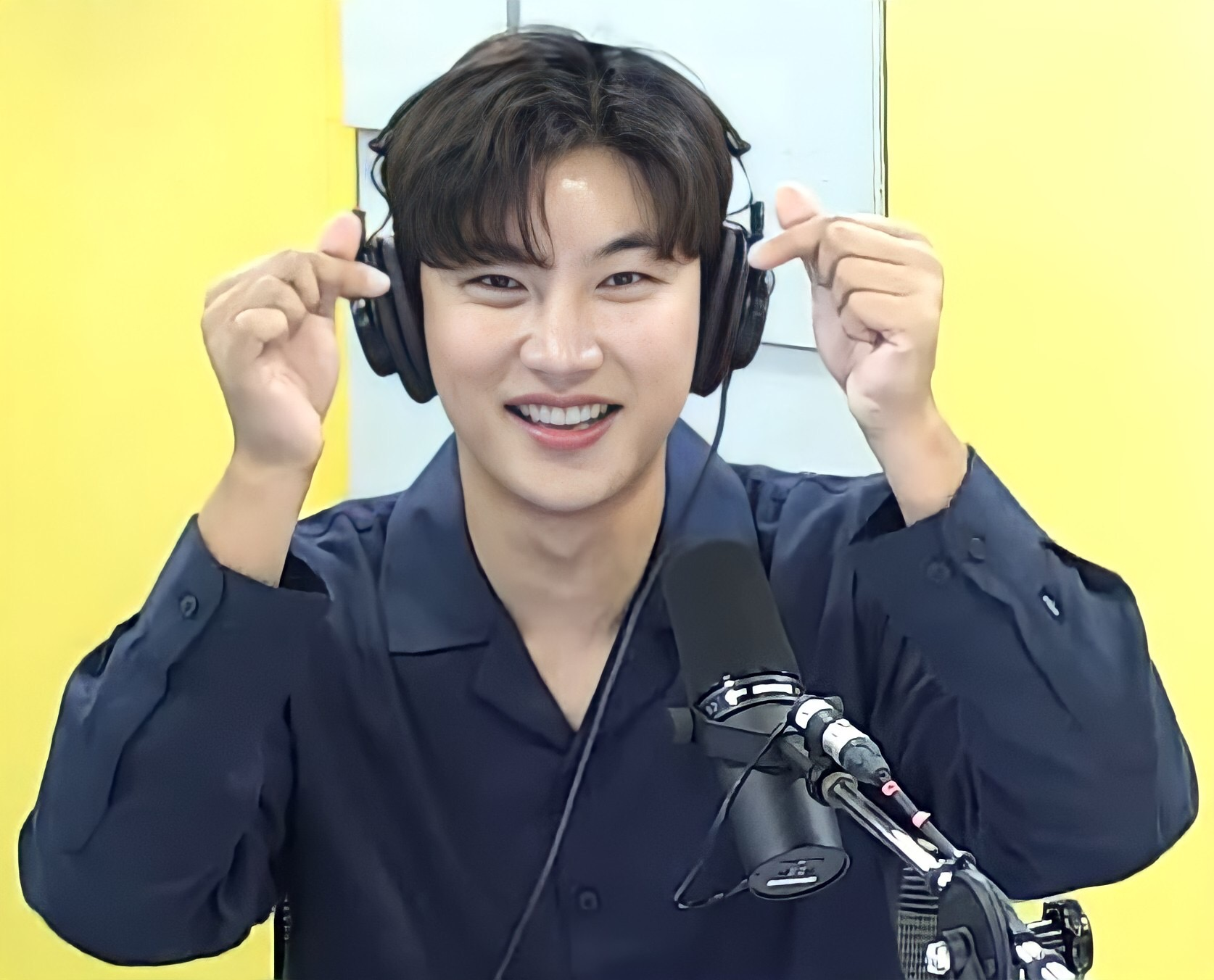
- Born: July 12, 1990 (age 36); Incheon, South Korea
- Occupations: Singer; dancer
- Years active: 2009–2019
- Spouse: Lee Eun-hye (m. 2018)
- Children: 1
- Musical career
- Genres: K-pop; dance; R&B
- Instrument: Vocals
- Labels: UFO; Cube

Korean name
- Hangul: 노지훈
- Hanja: 盧志勳
- RR: No Jihun
- MR: No Chihun

Roh Ji-hoon (Korean: 노지훈; born July 12, 1990), also spelled Noh Ji-hoon, is a South Korean idol pop singer and dancer signed under Cube Entertainment until 2017, and former contestant of MBC's Birth of a Great Star. He released his first and debut mini album The Next Big Thing on November 7, 2012.

== Career ==
=== Pre-debut ===
Roh Ji-hoon was born on July 12, 1990, in Incheon, South Korea, he is the younger sibling in his family and has two older sisters, and he graduated from Seoul Physical Education High school. Roh made it into the top 8 in "Birth of a Great Star" but was eliminated and after his elimination he signed with Cube Entertainment in 2011 and had trained for a year and a half before his debut under Cube Entertainment. Before Roh Ji-hoon joined MBC's "Birth of a Great Star, he had trained and released an OST song for drama "Can Anyone Love" back in 2009 under UFO Entertainment. He also made an appearance in the music video for "Love Virus", sung by BtoB's Eunkwang and Yoo Sungeun.

=== 2012: Debut with "The Next Big Thing" ===
Roh released his first mini album "The Next Big Thing" marking his first official debut into the music scene. The music video for the mini album's title track "Punishment" was released on Cube Entertainment's official YouTube channel on November 6, 2012, and the mini album was released digitally and physically on the next day. Roh made his debut performance on M! Countdown on November 8, 2012, and also other music shows to promote his title track "Punishment" and his mini album.

=== 2013–2014: New release, A Song For You ===
On May 27, 2013, Cube Entertainment's CEO Hong Seung-sung released a letter on Cube Entertainment's official website regarding the plans of Cubes' artists. He mentioned that "Cube's male soloist, Jihoonie has started his new challenge. Roh Ji Hoon who has preparing all this while will unfold his plans soon. Just like Jihoonie's bright smile, to keep watch of every day, Jihoonie has put in ever more effort before his debut, please actively give him your support."

On February 4, 2014, Roh released his second official single A Song For You which was composed and written by himself. The song was crowned No. 1 on Bugs and Soribada real time charts 2 days after its release. On February 6, 2014, Roh began promotional appearances on M! Countdown and other music programs.

=== 2015 to present: Comeback, Feeling, No Worries, Finger Heart ===
On September 16, 2015, Roh Ji Hoon made a comeback with his 2nd Mini Album, "Feeling" or "感 (감)". The self-composed 4th track, "9월 7일" or "September 7", was written for his close friend, RiSe of Ladies' Code, who was on "Birth of the Great Star" with him and died on that date.

On December 17, 2017, Roh Ji Hoon released a new single, "No Worries" after a hiatus of 2 years. He released the track shortly after leaving Cube Entertainment when his contract ended. The single was released online through Melon in Korea and iTune Music internationally.

On May 23, 2019, Roh Ji-hoon came back after one and a half years with the Latin trot single "Finger Heart". Shindong, Jeong Jun-ha, and Ellin of Crayon Pop made an appearance in the music video.

== Personal life ==
In April 2018, Roh Ji-hoon announced his engagement to racing model Lee Eun-hye, after dating her for 3 months, and her becoming pregnant. They officially married on May 19, 2018.

== Discography ==
=== Extended plays ===
- The Next Big Thing (2012)
- Feeling (2015)

=== Singles ===
Title	Year	Peak positions		Album
Title	Year	KOR Gaon	KOR Billboard	Album
Can Anyone Love Me (세상과 바꿀 너였는데)	2009	—	—	Non-album single
Punishment (벌 받나 봐)	2012	117	—	The Next Big Thing
A Song For You (너를 노래해)	2014	43	35	Feeling
If You Were Me (니가 나였더라면)	2015	172	—	Feeling
No Worries (안해도돼)	2017	—	—	Non-album single
Finger Heart (손가락하트)	2019	—	—	Non-album single
Please Call Me (불러줘요)	2024	—	—	Non-album single
"—" denotes releases that did not chart or were not released in that region.

== Filmography ==
=== Television series ===
Year	Title	Role	Ref.
2020	Lonely Enough to Love	Ji Hoon	

=== Reality shows ===
Year	Title	Notes
2011	Birth of a Great Star	Contestant
2019	Mr. Trot	Contestant
2020	Mr. House Husband	Cast
2020–21	The People of Trot	Deputy head coach
2021	Golden Time Signal	MC

== Concert ==
=== Concert participation ===
2013: United Cube Concert 2013
