= Ice Cream (Hyuna song) =

Single by Hyuna

from the album Melting
- Released: October 22, 2012
- Recorded: 2012
- Genre: K-pop; dance; hip hop
- Length: 3:16
- Label: Cube
- Songwriter: Brave Brothers
- Producer: Brave Brothers

Hyuna singles chronology
"Oppa Is Just My Style" (2012)	"Ice Cream" (2012)	"Red" (2014)

Music video
- "Ice Cream" on YouTube

"Ice Cream" is a song recorded by South Korean singer Hyuna, and it was taken from her second extended play, Melting.

The song alternative also features Maboos. On the day that the song was released, 22 October 2012, it was viewed two million times. Within four days, the music video for "Ice Cream" had almost reached eight million views on YouTube. Cube Entertainment (or Play CUBE Entertainment) released the video on YouTube. On 26 October (KST), the video reached ten million views on YouTube, nine days faster than Gangnam Style, HyunA's first collaboration with PSY. There is an ongoing discussion concerning whether or not the video should have a nineteen-plus rating. The song has a "strong hiphop sound and unique rapping" from Hyuna. On 21 October 2012, the extended play Melting was leaked on a "foreign music site", a day before the EP's intended release. The song nevertheless managed to reach first place on many music websites.

== Music video ==
The full music video was released at SBS MTV on October 21, and at YouTube on October 22, 2012. The song's music video also features a cameo by South Korean rapper Psy, who can be seen at the start of the video "gobbling up a few ice cream cones." Hyuna had previously featured in the music video for PSY's "Gangnam Style". The video featured bubbles, a tattooed man and ice cream. Four days after its release, the music video tied the record for the K-idol music video to achieve ten million views on YouTube the fastest.

== Charts ==
Chart	Peak position
Gaon Digital Chart	1
Gaon Mobile Ringtone Chart	14
US World Digital Chart	5

Year-end Chart (2012)	Position
South Korea (Gaon)	100

== Credits and personnel ==
- Hyuna – vocals, rap
- Brave Brothers – producing, songwriting, arranger, music
