= A Talk =

EP by Hyuna
- Released: July 28, 2014
- Genres: K-pop; R&B; hip hop
- Length: 15:54
- Labels: Cube; Universal Music

Hyuna chronology
Melting (2012)	A Talk (2014)	A+ (2015)

Singles from A Talk
- 1. "Red" Released: July 28, 2014

A Talk is the third extended play (EP) by South Korean singer Hyuna. It was released on July 28, 2014, by Cube Entertainment and distributed by Universal Music. The physical album was released a day later on July 29. The EP consists of five tracks and incorporates elements of Pop, R&B and Hip Hop. To promote the EP, Hyuna appeared on several South Korean music programs, including Music Bank, Show! Music Core and Inkigayo. "Red" was released as the title track for the EP.

== Background and release ==
On June 26, 2014, Cube Entertainment announced that Hyuna would be releasing her third solo EP. A reality documentary program, Sexy Queen, was produced to show her preparation and promotional activities for the album release. On July 15, the name of the TV show was changed from Sexy Queen to Hyuna's Free Month, and aired its first episode on July 21 on SBS MTV.

Hyuna performed the EP's lead single "Red" (빨개요; Ppalgaeyo) and the EP's B-side track "Blacklist" on music shows starting on July 25 on KBS's Music Bank, MBC's Show! Music Core, SBS's Inkigayo and Mnet's M! Countdown.

== Reception ==
On August 6, 2014, Hyuna won her first ever music show award on MBC Music's Show Champion for "Red", and won on the same show again the following week.

Despite calling "Red" "fifty shades of messy," Lucas Villa of AXS praised Hyuna for delivering a "club banger that would make Miley proud." Rolling Stone named "Red" number 5 on their year-end list of the top ten music videos of 2014.

== Commercial performance ==
A Talk entered and peaked at number 3 on the Gaon Album Chart on the chart issue dated July 27 – August 2, 2014. A Talk charted at number 17 on the Gaon Album Chart for the month of July 2014 with 8,183 copies sold.

The title track "Red" entered and peaked at number 3 on the Gaon Digital Chart on the chart issue dated July 27 – August 2, 2014 with 221,261 downloads sold – topping the componing Download Chart – and 3,230,615 streams. In the same week, "Blacklist", the EP's B-side track also entered the Digital Chart at number 70.

== Track listing ==
No.	Title	Lyrics	Music	Arrangement	Length
1.	"A Talk"	Hyuna, Seo Jae-woo, Astroz	Seo Jae-woo, Astroz	Astroz	1:26
2.	"French Kiss"	Brian Lee, Kim Tae-ho, LE	Brian Lee, Im Kwang-wook, Seo Jae-woo	Im Kwang-wook, Seo Jae-woo	3:12
3.	"Red" (빨개요; Ppalgaeyo)	Seo Jae-woo, BlueSun, Socrates	Seo Jae-woo, Kim Tae-ho	Seo Jae-woo, Kim Tae-ho	3:33
4.	"From When and Until When" (with Yang Yoseob) (어디부터 어디까지; Eodibuteo Eodikkaji)	Hyuna, Im Hyun-sik	Im Hyun-sik	Seo Jae-woo	3:23
5.	"Blacklist" (feat. LE)	Hyuna, LE	Seo Jae-woo, Kim Tae-ho	Seo Jae-woo, Kim Tae-ho	3:32

Taiwan edition
No.	Title	Lyrics	Music	Arrangement	Length
1.	"A Talk"	Hyuna, Seo Jae-woo, Astroz	Seo Jae-woo, Astroz	Astroz	1:26
2.	"French Kiss"	Brian Lee, Kim Tae-ho, LE	Brian Lee, Im Kwang-wook, Seo Jae-woo	Im Kwang-wook, Seo Jae-woo	3:12
3.	"Red" (빨개요; Ppalgaeyo)	Seo Jae-woo, BlueSun, Socrates	Seo Jae-woo, Kim Tae-ho	Seo Jae-woo, Kim Tae-ho	3:33
4.	"Blacklist" (featuring LE) (censored version)	Hyuna, LE	Seo Jae-woo, Kim Tae-ho	Seo Jae-woo, Kim Tae-ho	2:56

Taiwan edition DVD
No.	Title	Length
1.	"Red (music video)"
2.	"Red (making off)"
3.	"A Talk (Album making)"

== Charts ==
=== Albums chart ===
Chart	Peak position
Gaon Weekly albums chart	3
Gaon Monthly albums chart	17

=== Sales and certifications ===
Chart	Amount
Gaon physical sales	10,637+
Oricon physical sales	1,690+

== Awards and nominations ==
=== Music program awards ===
Song	Program	Date
"Red"	Show Champion (MBC Music)	August 6, 2014
"Red"	Show Champion (MBC Music)	August 13, 2014

== Release history ==
Country	Date	Format	Label
South Korea	July 28, 2014	Digital download	Cube Entertainment
South Korea	July 29, 2014	CD	Cube Entertainment
United States	August 11, 2014	Digital download	Cube Entertainment
Mexico	August 11, 2014	Digital download	Cube Entertainment
