= A+ (EP) =

EP by Hyuna
- Released: August 21, 2015
- Recorded: 2015
- Genre: K-pop; R&B; hip hop
- Length: 15:13
- Label: Cube; Universal Music
- Producer: Seo Jaewoo; Big Sancho; Son Youngjin; Jung Ilhoon; Kwon Jungyeol

Hyuna chronology
A Talk (2014)	A+ (2015)	A'wesome (2016)

Singles from A+
- 1. "Roll Deep" Released: August 21, 2015; 2. "Run & Run" Released: September 14, 2015

A+ is the fourth extended play (EP) by South Korean singer Hyuna. It was released on August 21, 2015, by Cube Entertainment and distributed by Universal Music. The EP consists of five tracks and incorporates Pop, R&B and Hip hop music genres. The physical album was released three days later on August 24, 2015. To promote the EP, Hyuna appeared on several South Korean music programs, including Music Bank, Show! Music Core and Inkigayo. "Roll Deep" was released as the lead single alongside the EP release.

== Background and release ==
On June 4, 2015, it was announced that Hyuna was preparing for her solo comeback in August. On August 9, 2009, Cube Entertainment released a trailer filmed in Los Angeles for her fourth mini-album A+, which was released on August 21, 2009. On August 13, "Because I'm the Best" (or "Roll Deep" in international markets) featuring Jung Ilhoon of BtoB was announced as the album's title track.

On August 20, 2009, the music video for "Because I'm The Best" was released via the 4Minute YouTube channel, followed by a racier 19+ version of the video deemed the "Original Version" on September 6.

On September 14, 2015, Hyuna released a short music video for the album's intro track "Run & Run".

== Commercial performance ==
A+ entered and peaked at number 5 on the Gaon Album Chart on the chart issue dated August 22–29, 2016. In its second week the mini album fell to number 33, dropping the chart the following week. A+ charted at number 15 on the Gaon Album Chart for the month of August 2015 with 7,387 copies sold.

The title track "Roll Deep" entered at number 32 on the Gaon Digital Chart on the chart issue dated August 22–29, 2016 with 80,086 downloads sold and 803,443 streams based on its first two days of availability. In its second week, the song peaked at number 13 with 107,723 downloads sold and 2,599,263 streams in its first full week. "Roll Deep" charted at number 44 on the Gaon Digital Chart for the month of August 2015.

== Reception ==
Billboard contributor Jeff Benjamin praised "Because I'm The Best", saying "HyunA confidently raps and chants about her swag, making playful remarks about how even her friends are jealous of her because, well, she's the best. Ilhoon [...] drops in to further the claims as the two spit over hard-hitting, synth-heavy hip-hop production with elements recalling recent work from Mike Will Made It and DJ Mustard." Benjamin also highlighted the styling and aesthetic of the track's music video, citing its "tongue-in-cheek presentation" as proof of the opinion that "HyunA is easily one of the baddest females in K-pop."

== Track listing ==
Track list
No.	Title	Lyrics	Music	Arrangement	Length
1.	"Run & Run" (intro)	Hyuna, Seo Jaewoo, Big Sancho	Seo Jaewoo, Big Sancho	Seo Jaewoo, Big Sancho, Son Youngjin	1:31
2.	"Roll Deep" ("Because I'm The Best"; feat. Jung Il-hoon)	Seo Jaewoo, Big Sancho, Son Youngjin, Jung Ilhoon	Seo Jaewoo, Big Sancho, Son Youngjin	Seo Jaewoo, Big Sancho	3:22
3.	"Ice Ice" (feat. Yuk Jidam)	Big Sancho, Hyuna, Yuk Jidam	Seo Jaewoo	Seo Jaewoo, Big Sancho	3:16
4.	"Get Out of My House" (feat. Kwon Jungyeol)	Big Sancho, Jung Il-hoon, Kwon Jungyeol	Big Sancho, Jung Il-hoon, Kwon Jungyeol	Seo Jaewoo, Big Sancho	3:22
5.	"Serene"	Seo Jaewoo, Son Youngjin, Hyuna	Seo Jaewoo, Son Youngjin	Seo Jaewoo, Son Youngjin	3:42

== Charts ==
=== Music charts ===
Chart	Peak position	Note
Gaon Weekly Albums Chart	5	
Gaon Monthly Albums Chart	15	
Billboard World Albums Chart	2	

=== Sales and certifications ===
Chart	Amount	Note
Gaon physical sales	12,240+	

== Release history ==
Country	Date	Format	Label
South Korea	August 21, 2015	Digital download	Cube Entertainment
South Korea	August 24, 2015	CD	Cube Entertainment
United States	September 18, 2015	Digital download	Cube Entertainment
