= Change (Hyuna song) =

Single by Hyuna featuring Yong Jun-hyung
- Released: January 4, 2010
- Recorded: 2009–2010
- Genre: K-pop; dance; hip hop
- Length: 3:31
- Label: Cube; Universal Music
- Songwriters: Shinsadong Tiger; Jeon Hye-won
- Producers: Shinsadong Tiger; Jeon Hye-won

Hyuna singles chronology
"Change" (2010)	"A Bitter Day" (2011)

Music video
- "Change" on YouTube

"Change" is the debut solo single by South Korean singer Hyuna. It marked her debut as a solo artist but still as part of girl group 4Minute. It was released as a digital single by Cube Entertainment and Universal Music on January 4, 2010. The lyrics were written by Shinsadong Tiger and Jeon Hyewon, who also composed the music. To promote the song, Hyuna appeared on several South Korean music programs, including Music Bank, Show! Music Core and Inkigayo. A music video for the song was released on January 6.

The single was a commercial success peaking at number 2 on the Gaon Digital Chart in its weekly chart and at number 5 in its monthly chart.

== Release ==
"Change" was officially released on January 4, 2010. The song also featured Beast's Jun Hyung for the rap part.

== Commercial performance ==
"Change" was a commercial success. The song entered and peaked at number 2 on the Gaon Digital Chart on the chart issue dated January 3–9, 2010. The song stayed in the Top 10 of the chart for five consecutive weeks - its first two weeks at number 2 - and a total of fourteen consecutive weeks in the Top 100 of the chart.

The song peaked at number 5 on the Gaon Digital Chart for the month of January 2010. In the month of February the song placed at number 11, while in the month of march placed at number 50.

The single placed at number 86 on the Gaon Digital Chart 2010 year-end chart.

== Promotion ==
Hyuna had her solo debut performances on January 8–11 with "Change" on Mnet's M! Countdown, KBS's Music Bank, MBC's Show! Music Core and SBS's Inkigayo. Her "Change" promotions ended in March 2010.

== Music video ==
On January 3, 2010, a teaser video was released online. The full music video was released on January 6, 2010.

It begins with Hyuna dancing in a dark city, she is dressed in a gray suit. Then she sits on a chair and sings, she is dressed in a black suit. The music video has several scenes as Hyuna dancing in a dark street wearing a pair of jeans and a black blouse, then she is dancing on scene in a room wearing a short black skirt and a black shirt with red Calvin Kleins.

In the middle of the song at the dance break, she is dancing in the rain and at the end of the song she is dancing in front of a white background dressed in a white suit.

=== Controversy ===
On January 14, 2010, the "Change" music video was flagged with a 19+ rating due to Hyuna's provocative dancing, citing it to be inappropriate to minors. Cube Entertainment stated that the music video would be re-edited and submitted for approval.

== Track listing ==
Digital download

No.	Title	Lyrics	Music	arrangement	Length
1.	"Change" (featuring Yong Jun-hyung)	Shinsadong Tiger; Jeon Hyewon	Shinsadong Tiger; Jeon Hyewon	Shinsadong Tiger	3:32

== Charts ==
=== Weekly charts ===
Chart (2010)	Peak position
South Korea (Gaon Digital Chart)	2

=== Monthly charts ===
Chart (2010)	Peak position
South Korea (Gaon Digital Chart)	5

=== Year-end charts ===
Chart (2010)	Peak position
South Korea (Gaon Digital Chart)	86
