= Melting (EP) =

EP by Hyuna
- Released: October 21, 2012
- Recorded: 2012
- Genre: K-pop; dance-pop; R&B; hip hop
- Length: 16:53
- Label: Cube

Hyuna chronology
Bubble Pop! (2011)	Melting (2012)	A Talk (2014)

Singles from Melting
- 1. "Ice Cream" Released: October 21, 2012

Melting is the second extended play (EP) by South Korean singer Hyuna. It was released on October 21, 2012, by Cube Entertainment. "Ice Cream" was released as the lead single.

== Background and release ==
On October 9, 2012, it was revealed that Hyuna would return as a solo artist on October 17 with her new single, “Ice Cream“ from her second EP, Melting. On October 13, she postponed the EP release date to make addition to "Ice Cream"'s music video. On October 17, it was reported that the EP track "Very Hot" was banned by television networks KBS and MBC. due to copyright: the song lyrics contained a reference to the brand KakaoTalk. The album was leaked several days on a "foreign music site" before its original release date of October 22, 2012 without permission, prompting Cube Entertainment officially release the album a day earlier than originally planned.

The EP begins with "Don't Fall Apart" (also translated as "Straight Up"), a hip-hop track written and composed by Beatamin and containing marching band elements. The lead single, "Ice Cream", is a hip-hop and pop track written and composed by Brave Brothers and Elephant Kingdom. Maboos from the hip-hop group Electroboyz also features in the song. The third track, "Unripe Apple", is a collaboration between Hyuna and the main rapper of BTOB, Jung Ilhoon, who contributed as a lyricist. "To My Boyfriend" is a ballad co-written by Hyuna with Son Young-jin and Im Sang-hyuk, also the song's composers. The last track, "Very Hot", was written and composed by Hyuna and best friend, Kim Lee-won. Shinsadong Tiger, the composer of her 2011 hit Bubble Pop!, also participated in the composition of the song.

== Promotion and reception ==
The music video for "Ice Cream" was released on October 22, 2012. It features a short cameo from Psy. Four days after its release, the music video achieved 10 million YouTube views, tying the record at the time for K-pop music video YouTube views. This exceeded Psy's viewing rate for his viral hit, "Gangnam Style", which took fifteen days to acquire the same number of views. The video features bubbles, a tattooed man, and ice cream. There was discussion concerning whether or not the video should have a nineteen-plus rating.

Hyuna began music show promotions on October 26, 2012, with performances of "Ice Cream", "Don't Fall Apart" and "Unripe Apple" on KBS's Music Bank.

Melting went to number 5 on the Gaon Weekly Albums Chart. "Ice Cream" reached number 6 on Billboard's K-Pop Hot 100 and number 1 on the Gaon Weekly Digital Charts.

== Track listing ==
Melting track listing
No.	Title	Lyrics	Music	Length
1.	"Don't Fall Apart" (흐트러지지 마)	Beatamin	Beatamin	2:54
2.	"Ice Cream"	Brave Brothers (용감한 형제)	Brave Brothers (용감한 형제), Elephant Kingdom (코끼리왕국)	3:16
3.	"Unripe Apple" (풋사과) (featuring Jung Il-hoon of BTOB)	Seo Yong-bae, Seo Jae-woo, Jung Il-hoon	Seo Yong-bae, Seo Jae-woo	3:17
4.	"To My Boyfriend" (내 남자친구에게)	Hyuna, Son Young-jin, Im Sang-hyuk	Hyuna, Son Yong-jin, Im San-hyuk	3:44
5.	"Very Hot"	Hyuna, Kim Lee-won	Hyuna, Kim Lee-won, Shinsadong Tiger	3:42
Total length:				16:53

Taiwan special edition CD (Cube #3279875) bonus tracks
No.	Title	Writer(s)	Length
6.	"Bubble Pop!"		3:33
7.	"Change" (featuring Yong Jun-hyung of Beast)	Shinsadong Tiger	3:32
8.	"Downtown" (featuring Jeon Ji-yoon)		3:23
9.	"A Bitter Day" (featuring G.NA and Yong Jun-hyung)		3:47
10.	"Just Follow" (featuring Dok2)		3:25

Taiwan special edition DVD (Cube #3731674) – music videos
No.	Title	Length
1.	"Ice Cream"
2.	"Bubble Pop!"
3.	"Change"

== Charts ==
Chart performance for Melting
Chart (2012)	Peak position
Gaon Weekly albums chart	5
Gaon Monthly albums chart	11
Oricon Weekly albums chart	158

== Sales ==
Sales for Melting
Chart	Amount
Gaon physical sales	14,297

== Release history ==
Release history and formats for Melting
Country	Date	Format	Label
South Korea	October 21, 2012	Digital download	Cube Entertainment
South Korea	October 22, 2012	CD	Cube Entertainment
United States	October 23, 2012	Digital download	Cube Entertainment
