= G.NA =

Canadian singer active in South Korea

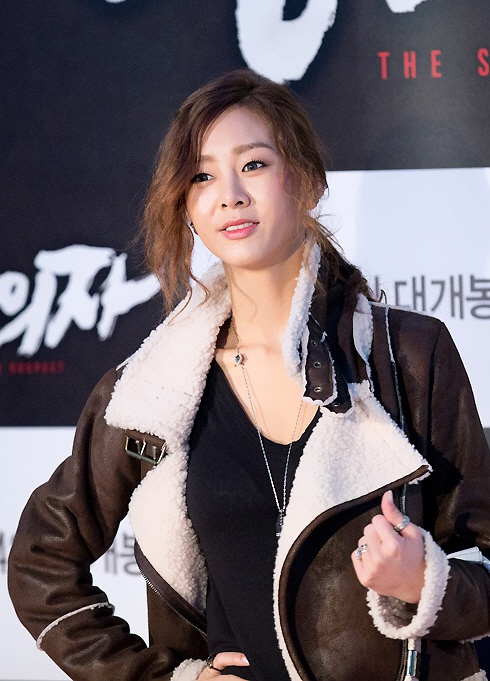
- G.NA in December 2013
- Born: Gina Jane Choi; September 13, 1987 (age 38); Edmonton, Alberta, Canada
- Citizenship: South Korea; Canada
- Occupations: Singer; actress
- Musical career
- Genres: K-pop; R&B
- Years active: 2007–2016
- Labels: Good; Cube
- Formerly of: Five Girls; United Cube

Korean name
- Hangul: 최지나
- RR: Choe Jina
- MR: Ch'oe China

Gina Jane Choi (born September 13, 1987), better known by her stage name G.NA, is a Canadian singer, songwriter and actress based in South Korea. She released her debut EP, Draw G's First Breath, on July 14, 2010.

As a solo artist, she released one studio album, four extended plays, fifteen singles (including seven as a featured artist). She also released six OSTs.

== Early life and education ==
Gina Jane Choi, Korean name Choi Ji-na (최지나), was born on September 13, 1987, in Edmonton, Alberta, Canada. She graduated from Fraser Heights Secondary School in Surrey, British Columbia.

== Career ==
G.NA was originally set to debut as the leader of girl group Five Girls under Good Entertainment. However, the group disbanded shortly before their scheduled debut in 2007 due to Good Entertainment's financial troubles and the members all left for separate Korean entertainment agencies; Choi joined Cube Entertainment.

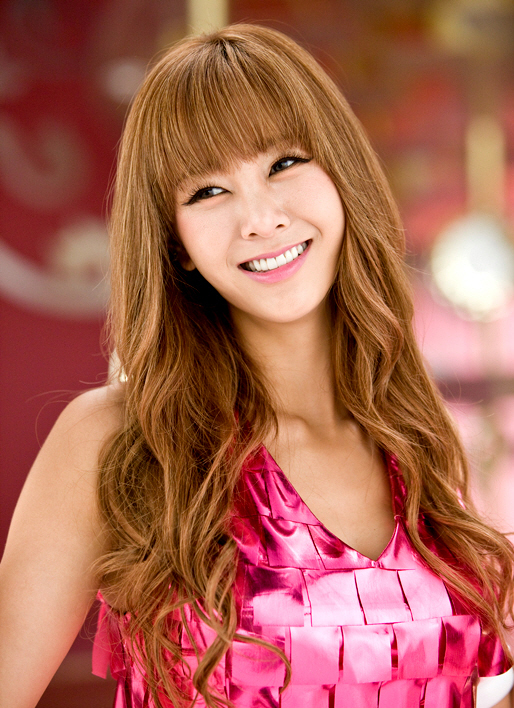
G.NA for LG in 2011

G.NA released a duet with Rain, "Aeini Saenggimyeon Hago Sipeun Il" ("Things I Want to Do When I Have a Lover", 애인이 생기면 하고 싶은 일), on July 5, 2010. Her debut EP, Draw G's First Breath, was released the same year. In February 2011, she released her debut studio album Black & White, which gained her success and sold more copies. and she sang on Hyuna's album Bubble Pop! in the song "A Bitter Day".

Her third EP, Bloom, was released on May 22, 2012, with the lead single "2HOT". In October, she released Oui, comprising English versions of her previous hit songs. Beautiful Kisses was released in March 2013.

G.NA collaborated with Aaron Yan for his song "Half (1/2)", for the drama series Fall in Love with Me, and was in a variety show, Real Man.

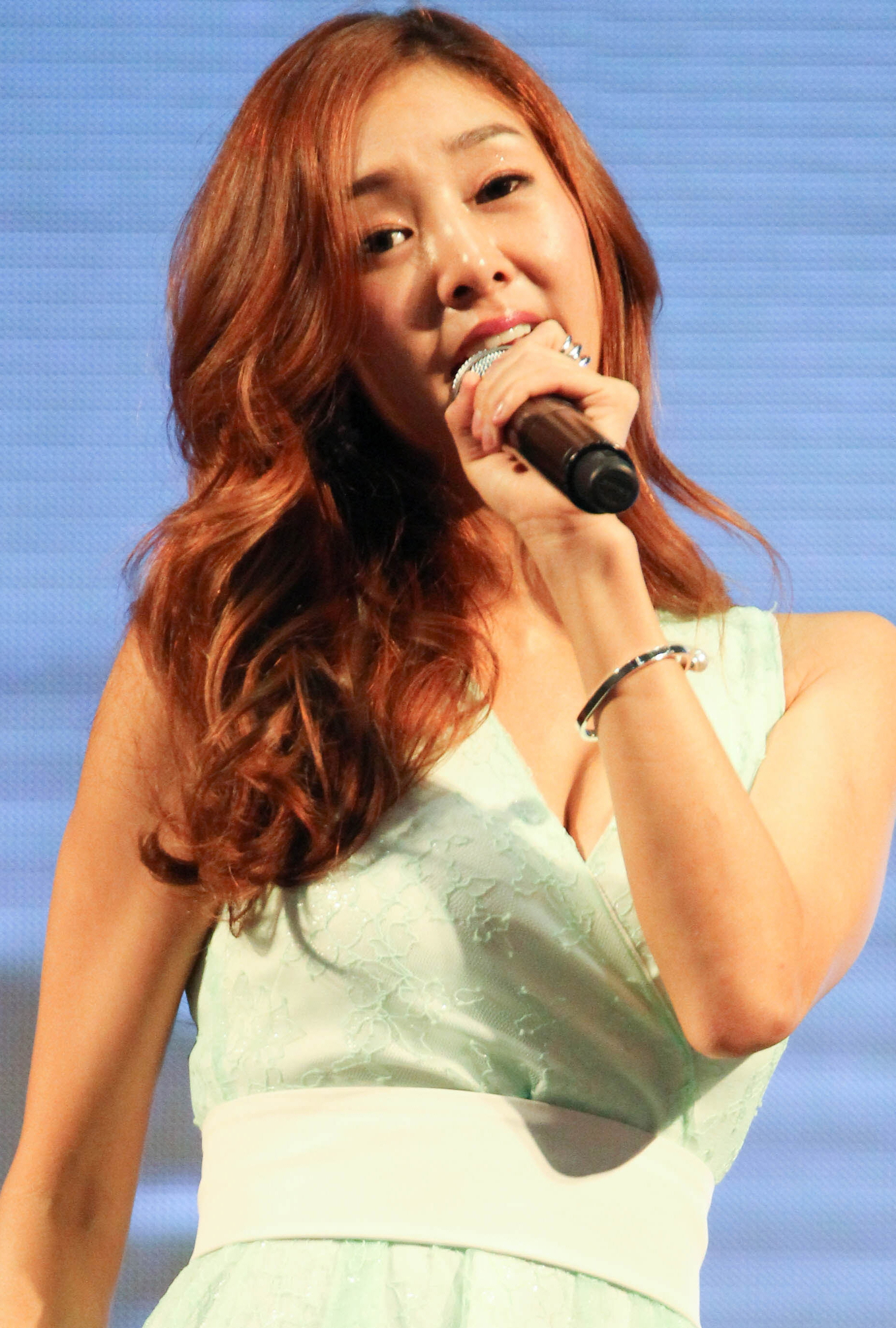
G.NA performing in 2014

In 2015 she debuted in the idol sub-unit Chamsonyeo, a group produced in the TV program Hitmaker produced by Defconn and Jeong Hyeong-don.

== Legal issues ==
On February 1, 2016, G.NA was involved in a prostitution scandal, where she was accused of being paid 35 million won ($30,000 USD) by an unidentified businessman for sex. G.NA denied this accusation and explained that a male friend, whom she later learned was a "broker for high-end prostitution", had lent her money during her financial troubles and asked her to meet his businessman friend, intending the two to have sex for having lent her money, whereas she had believed the meeting with the businessman to be "romantic" in nature. She was ultimately charged with prostitution and ordered to pay a fine of 2 million won. Later that month, it was revealed that her contract expired in March and she would be leaving her agency. She has left her entertainment career in an indefinite hiatus.

== Discography ==
=== Studio albums ===
| Title | Album details | Peak chart positions | Sales |
| Title | Album details | KOR | Sales |
Korean
| Black & White | Released: January 18, 2011; Label: Cube Entertainment; Format: CD, digital download | 11 | KOR: 13,136 |

=== Extended plays ===
| Title | Album details | Peak chart positions | Sales |
| Title | Album details | KOR | Sales |
Korean
| Draw G's First Breath | Released: July 14, 2010; Label: Cube Entertainment; Format: CD, digital download | 10 | —N/a |
| Top Girl | Released: August 23, 2011; Label: Cube Entertainment; Format: CD, digital download | 6 | KOR: 7,926 |
| Bloom | Released: May 22, 2012; Label: Cube Entertainment; Format: CD, digital download | 10 | KOR: 5,024 |
| Beautiful Kisses | Released: March 14, 2013; Label: Cube Entertainment; Format: CD, digital download | 7 | KOR: 3,771 |
English
| Oui | Released: September 21, 2012; Label: Cube Entertainment; Format: Digital download | — | —N/a |
"—" denotes releases that did not chart or were not released in that region.

=== Singles ===
| Title | Year | Peak chart positions | | | Sales | Album |
| Title | Year | KOR Gaon | KOR Hot | US World | Sales | Album |
|---|---|---|---|---|---|---|
| "Things I'd Like to Do with My Lover" (애인이 생기면 하고 싶은 일) (with Rain) | 2010 | 13 | — | — | KOR: 967,801 | Draw G's First Breath |
| "I'll Back Off So You Can Live Better" (꺼져 줄게 잘 살아) (feat. Junhyung) | 2010 | 2 | — | — | KOR: 1,772,952 | Draw G's First Breath |
| "Supa Solo" (feat. Swings) | 2010 | 8 | — | — | | Draw G's First Breath |
| "Say You Love Me" (with Hyuna) | 2010 | 14 | — | — | | Non-album single |
| "Nice to Meet You" (처음 뵙겠습니다) (with Wheesung) | | 29 | — | — | | Black & White |
| "Black & White" | 2011 | 1 | — | — | KOR: 2,319,222 | Black & White |
| "Count On Me" (with Lee Ki-chan) | 2011 | 43 | — | — | | Non-album single |
| "Banana" (feat. Swings & JC Jieun) | 2011 | 30 | — | — | | Top Girl |
| "Top Girl" | 2011 | 4 | — | — | KOR: 1,906,619 | Top Girl |
| "2Hot" | 2012 | 2 | 2 | — | KOR: 1,626,839 | Bloom |
| "Beautiful Day" (with Sanchez) | 2012 | 30 | — | — | | Non-album single |
| "Oops!" (feat. Ilhoon) | 2013 | 13 | 12 | 19 | KOR: 498,011 | Beautiful Kisses |
| "Smile Again" (with Trouble Maker and Ryu Hyun-jin) | 2013 | 83 | — | — | | Non-album single |
| "Pretty Lingerie" (예쁜 속옷) | 2014 | 11 | 19 | — | KOR: 387,387 | G.NA's Secret (single) |
| "Miracle" (with The One, Jiyoung (A.Kor), Kim Woo-joo, Lee Ye-joon) | 2014 | — | — | — | | Non-album singles |
| "Us" (feat. Kim Tae-woo) | 2014 | 71 | — | — | | Non-album singles |
"—" denotes releases that did not chart or were not released in that region.

=== Other charted songs ===
| Title | Year | Peak chart positions | | Album |
| Title | Year | KOR Gaon | KOR Hot | Album |
|---|---|---|---|---|
| "There's a Rumor" | 2010 | 183 | — | Draw G's First Breath |
| "Don't Be Mad Anymore" (feat. Junbum, Hyungyu, & Hyunsuk) | 2011 | 185 | — | Black & White |
| "I Miss You Already" | 2011 | 123 | — | Black & White |
| "At First Sight, at a Glance" (feat. Verbal Jint) | 2011 | 198 | — | Black & White |
| "I Hate You" | 2011 | 96 | — | Top Girl |
| "Without You" | 2011 | 117 | — | Top Girl |
| "Icon" | 2011 | 150 | — | Top Girl |
| "Green Light" (feat. Jay Park) | 2012 | 58 | 83 | Bloom |
| "Summer Star" | 2012 | 124 | — | Bloom |
| "Oppa, Dongsaeng" (feat. Sangchu of Mighty Mouth) | 2012 | 79 | 85 | Bloom |
| "Drop It (Cut It Off)" | 2012 | 142 | — | Bloom |
| "Mind-Sync" (feat. Huh Gak) | 2013 | 65 | 42 | Beautiful Kisses |
| "Oh, Good!" | 2013 | 160 | — | Beautiful Kisses |
| "Hate It, Can't Stand It" | 2013 | 177 | — | Beautiful Kisses |
"—" denotes releases that did not chart or were not released in that region.

=== Soundtrack appearances ===
| Title | Year | Peak chart positions | Sales | Album |
| Title | Year | KOR | Sales | Album |
|---|---|---|---|---|
| "Kiss Me" (키스해줄래) | 2010 | 24 | | Playful Kiss OST |
| "Cause You're My Man" (내 사람이라서) | 2011 | 12 | KOR: 1,415,791 | The Greatest Love OST |
| "Tell Me Now" | 2012 | 20 | | The Thousandth Man OST |
| "Love & Slow" | 2013 | 43 | | Mate OST |
| "Half" (with Aaron Yan) | 2014 | — | | Fall In Love With Me OST |
| "Don't Cry" | 2015 | — | | The Scholar Who Walks the Night OST |
"—" denotes releases that did not chart or were not released in that region.

== Filmography ==
=== Television drama ===
| Year | Title | Role |
|---|---|---|
| 2012 | SBS's Salamander Guru and The Shadows | Krystal (cameo) |
| 2012 | tvN's Reply 1997 | Choi Jin-ah (cameo) |
| 2011 | SBS's Welcome to the Show | Herself (cameo) |
| 2015 | MBC's A Week of Romance | Herself |

=== Variety show ===
| Year | Title | Note(s) |
|---|---|---|
| 2007 | MTV's Diary of Five Girls | All |
| 2011 | MBC's Weekly Idol | 11 & 20 episode |
| 2011 | Oh my school | 18 & 19 episode |
| 2011 | Apink News | Season 1 Episode 2 (anchor) |
| 2011 | Apink News | Season 2 Episode 2 (cameo) |
| 2012 | MBC's Weekly Idol | 50 episode |
| 2012 | The Romantic and Idol | Season 2 - Episodes 1-6 |
| 2013 | Three Turns | A Real Man Special in 2013.05.25 |
| 2014 | KBS's Hello Counselor | episode 173 |
| 2014 | MBC's Weekly Idol | 147 episode |
| 2014 | MNET's Singer Game | |
| 2015 | MBC's Weekly Idol | 187 episode (aka Chamsonyeo) |
| 2015 | MBC's Real Man | Female special season 1 |
| 2015 | MBC's King of Mask Singer | Episode 3 (Fox in Wonderland) |
| 2016 | MBC's We Got Married | Episode 304 |

=== Music video appearances ===
| Year | Artist | Title |
|---|---|---|
| 2008 | 2PM | 10 Out of 10 |
| 2011 | Lim Jeong-hee | Golden Lady |

== Awards and nominations ==
| Years | Awards |
|---|---|
| 2010 | Cyworld Digital Music Awards: Rookie Of The Month (August); 18th Korean Culture Entertainment Awards: New Generation Popular Music Teen Singer Award |
| 2011 | Gaon Chart K-Pop Awards: Best Rookie Award; 5th Mnet 20's Choice Awards: Hot Online Song ("Black & White"); 8th Asia Song Festival: Asia Influential Artists; 26th Golden Disk Awards: Digital Bonsang ("Black & White") |

=== Mnet Asian Music Awards ===
| Year | Nominee / work | Award | Result |
|---|---|---|---|
| 2010 | "꺼져 줄게 잘 살아" "I'll Back Off So You Can Live Better (feat. Jun Hyung)" | Best New Female Artist | Nominated |
| 2011 | "Black & White" | Best Female | Nominated |
| 2011 | "Black & White" | Best Dance Performance | Nominated |
| 2012 | "2HOT" | Best Female Artist - Solo | Nominated |
| 2012 | "2HOT" | Best Dance Performance | Nominated |
| 2013 | "Oops!" | Best Dance Performance - Female Solo | Nominated |
