= MAMA Award for Best Dance Performance =

Asian music award

MAMA Award for Best Dance Performance (Solo or Group)
- Awarded for: Popular dance performance of the year
- Country: South Korea
- Presented by: CJ E&M Pictures (Mnet)
- First award: 1999
- Currently held by: Seventeen – "Thunder"; Aespa – "Whiplash"; G-Dragon – "Too Bad" (feat. Anderson .Paak); Jennie – "Like Jennie" (2025)
- Website: MAMA Awards

The MAMA Award for Best Male / Female Dance Performance (Solo or Group) (베스트 댄스 퍼포먼스 (남자/여자 – 솔로/그룹)) is an award presented annually by CJ E&M Pictures (Mnet). Mnet is also the one who chooses which group or individual will win in this category, as well as other categories in MAMA.

It was first awarded at the 1st Mnet Asian Music Awards ceremony held in 1999; Lee Jung-hyun won the award for her dance performance in "Come," and it is given in honor of the artist/s with the best dance performance in the music industry.

== History ==
Year(s)	Best Solo			Best Group			Combined
Year(s)	Male	Female	Combined	Male	Female	Combined	Combined
1999–2009							check
2010–2012			check	check	check		
2013	check	check		check	check		
2014–2022			check	check	check		
2023–2025	check	check		check	check		

== Winners and nominees ==
=== 1990s–2000s ===
Year	Performing artist(s)	Work	List of nominees
1999	Lee Jung-hyun	"Come"	Nominees: Baby V.O.X. – "Get Up"; Uhm Jung-hwa – "I Don't Know"; H.O.T. – "I Yah!" (아이야); Clon – "Come To Me"
2000	Clon	"Choryeon"	Nominees: Park Ji-yoon – "Coming of Age Ceremony" (성인식); Shinhwa – "Only One"; H.O.T. – "Outside Castle"; Yoo Seung-jun – "Vision" (비전); Fin.K.L – "Now"
2001	Yoo Seung-jun	"Wow"	Nominees
2002	BoA	"No. 1"	Nominees: Kang Sung-hoon – "My Girl"; Shinhwa – "Perfect Man"; Lee Jung-hyun – "Half" (반); Ha Ri-su – "Liar"
2003	BoA	"Atlantis Princess"	Nominees: Kim Hyun Jung – "If This Is The End" (끝이라면); Shinhwa – "Your Wedding" (너의 결혼 식); Lee Hyori – "10 Minutes"; jtL – "Without Your Love"
2004	Shinhwa (Note: Titled as "Best Dance Video" award.)	"Brand New"	Nominees: TVXQ – "The Way U Are"; BoA – "My Name"; Rain – "It's Raining"; Seven – "Passion" (열정)
2005	Lee Min-woo (M)	"Bump"	Nominees: TVXQ – "Rising Sun"; BoA – "Girls On Top"; Jang Woo-hyuk – "Sun That Never Sets" (지지 않는 태양); Clon – "My Love Song-yi" (내 사랑송 이)
2006	SS501	"Snow Prince"	Nominees: Turtles – "Airplane"; TVXQ – "'O'-Jung.Ban.Hap."; Rain – "I'm Coming"; Super Junior – "U"
2007	The Grace	"One More Time, OK?"	Nominees: Seo In-Young – "I Want You"; Super Junior – "Don't Don"; Ivy – "Sonata Of Temptation"; Lee Min-woo (M) – "Stomp"
2008	Lee Hyori	"U-Go-Girl"	Nominees: TVXQ – "Mirotic"; Girls' Generation – "Kissing You"; Super Junior-H – "Cooking Cooking"; Wonder Girls – "Nobody"
2009	Kara	"Honey"	Nominees: 2NE1 – "I Don't Care"; 2PM – "Again & Again"; Girls' Generation – "Gee"; Super Junior – "Sorry, Sorry"

=== 2010s ===
Year	Performing artist(s)	Work	List of nominees
2010	Rain	"Love Song"	Nominees: Narsha – "Bbiri Bbabba"; Lee Hyori – "Chitty Chitty Bang Bang"; Taeyang – "I'll Be There"; Hyuna – "Change"
2010	2PM	"I'll Be Back"	Nominees: Beast – "Shock"; MBLAQ – "Y"; Shinee – "Lucifer"; Super Junior – "Bonamana"
2010	Miss A	"Bad Girl Good Girl"	Nominees: 2NE1 – "Can't Nobody"; 4Minute – "HUH!"; Secret – "Magic"; T-ara – "Bo Peep Bo Peep"
2011	Hyuna	"Bubble Pop!"	Nominees: Kim Hyun Joong – "Break Down"; Jay Park – "Abandoned"; Jang Woo Hyuk – "Time is (L)over"; G.NA – "Black & White"
2011	Beast	"Fiction"	Nominees: TVXQ – "Keep Your Head Down"; Big Bang – "Tonight"; Super Junior – "Mr. Simple"; MBLAQ – "Mona Lisa"; Infinite – "Be Mine"
2011	Miss A	"Good-bye Baby"	Nominees: Girls' Generation – "The Boys"; Secret – "Shy Boy"; T-ara – "Roly-Poly"; 4Minute – "Mirror Mirror"; 2NE1 – "I Am the Best"
2012	Psy	"Gangnam Style"	Nominees: JYP – "You′re the One"; BoA – "Only One"; Seo In Young – "Let′s Dance"; Hyuna – "Ice Cream"
2012	Shinee	"Sherlock (Clue + Note)"	Nominees: Beast – "Beautiful Night"; Super Junior – "Sexy, Free & Single"; MBLAQ – "This is War"; Infinite – "The Chaser"
2012	f(x)	"Electric Shock"	Nominees: 4Minute – "Volume Up"; Miss A – "Touch"; Secret – "Poison"; SISTAR – "Alone"
2013	G-Dragon	"Crooked"	Nominees: Jay Park – "Joah"; PSY – "Gentleman"; Yoseob – "Caffeine"
2013	CL	"The Baddest Female"	Nominees: G.NA – "Ooops!"; Seo In Young – "Please Love Me"; Sunmi – "24 Hours"; Lee Hyori – "Bad Girls"
2013	Shinee	"Dream Girl"	Nominees: B1A4 – "What's Going On"; Exo – "Growl"; Beast – "Shadow"; Infinite – "Man In Love"
2013	Sistar	"Give It To Me"	Nominees: Girl's Day – "Expect"; Girls' Generation – "I Got a Boy"; Crayon Pop – "Bar Bar Bar"; 4Minute – "What's Your Name?"
2014	Infinite	"Last Romeo"	Nominees: Exo – "Overdose"; VIXX – "Eternity"; TVXQ – "Something"; BTS – "Boy In Luv"
2014	Girl's Day	"Something"	Nominees: AOA – "Miniskirt"; Miss A – "Hush"; Sistar – "Touch My Body"; 4Minute – "Whatcha Doin' Today"
2014	Sunmi	"Full Moon"	Nominees: Rain – "30 Sexy"; Ailee – "Don't Touch Me"; Hyuna – "Red"; Hyolyn – "One Way"
2015	Shinee	"View"	Nominees: Big Bang – "Bang Bang Bang"; Exo – "Call Me Baby"; Got7 – "If You Do"; VIXX – "Love Equation"; Infinite – "Bad"
2015	Red Velvet	"Ice Cream Cake"	Nominees: AOA – "Heart Attack"; EXID – "Ah Yeah"; Girl's Day – "Ring My Bell"; Sistar – "Shake It"; 4Minute – "Crazy"
2015	Hyuna	"Roll Deep"	Nominees: Gain – "Paradise Lost"; Niel – "Lovekiller"; Park Jin Young – "Who's Your Mama?"; Amber – "Shake that Brass"
2016	BTS	"Blood Sweat & Tears"	Nominees: Exo – "Monster"; Got7 – "Hard Carry"; Monsta X – "All In"; VIXX – "Fantasy"; Seventeen – "Pretty U"
2016	GFriend	"Rough"	Nominees: AOA – "Good Luck"; Twice – "Cheer Up"; Red Velvet – "Russian Roulette"; Sistar – "I Like That"
2016	Taemin	"Press Your Number"	Nominees: Luna – "Free Somebody"; Jun Hyoseong – "Find Me"; Tiffany – "I Just Wanna Dance"; Hyuna – "How's This?"
2017	Seventeen	"Don't Wanna Cry"	Nominees: NCT 127 – "Cherry Bomb"; Exo – "Ko Ko Bop"; Monsta X – "Beautiful; BTS – "DNA"; VIXX – "Shangri-La"
2017	Twice	"Signal"	Nominees: Girls' Generation – "Holiday"; GFriend – "Love Whisper"; Apink – "Five"; Red Velvet – "Red Flavor"
2017	Taemin	"Move"	Nominees: Hyuna – "Babe"; Sunmi – "Gashina"; Psy – "New Face"; Lee Hyori – "Black"
2018	Seventeen	"Oh My!"	Nominees: BTS – "Fake Love"; Wanna One – "Boomerang"; Got7 – "Lullaby"; Monsta X – "Shoot Out"; Pentagon – "Shine"
2018	Twice	"What Is Love?"	Nominees: Blackpink – "Ddu-Du Ddu-Du"; Red Velvet – "Bad Boy"; AOA – "Bingle Bangle"; Lovelyz – "That Day"; Oh My Girl – "Secret Garden"
2018	Chung Ha	"Roller Coaster"	Nominees: Sunmi – "Siren"; Seungri – "1, 2, 3!"; Hyuna – "Lip & Hip"; Hyolyn – "Dally" (feat. Gray)
2019	BTS	"Boy With Luv" (feat. Halsey)	Nominees: Got7 – "Eclipse"; Exo – "Tempo"; NU'EST – "Bet Bet"; Seventeen – "Fear"; Monsta X – "Alligator"
2019	Twice	"Fancy"	Nominees: Blackpink – "Kill This Love"; Red Velvet – "Zimzalabim"; Iz*One – "Violeta"; (G)I-dle – "Senorita"; G-Friend – "Sunrise"
2019	Chung Ha	"Gotta Go"	Nominees: Sunmi – "Lalalay"; Jennie – "Solo"; Taemin – "Want"; Hwasa – "Twit"

=== 2020s ===
Year	Performing artist(s)	Work	List of nominees
2020	BTS	"Dynamite"	Nominees: Ateez – "Inception"; EXO – "Obsession"; NCT 127 – "Kick It"; TXT – "Can't You See Me?"; Seventeen – "Left & Right"
2020	Blackpink	"How You Like That"	Nominees: Itzy - "Wannabe"; Twice - "More & More"; Red Velvet - "Psycho"; IZ*ONE - "Secret Story of the Swan"; Oh My Girl - "Nonstop"
2020	Taemin	"Criminal"	Nominees: Baekhyun – "Candy"; Zico – "Any Song"; Woodz – "Love Me Harder"; Kang Daniel – "Who U Are"; Lim Ji-min – "Who, You?"
2020	Jessi	"Nunu Nana"	Nominees: YooA – "Bon voyage"; Hwasa – "María"; Sunmi – "pporappippam"; Chungha – "Stay Tonight"; Moonbyul – "Eclipse"
2020	Hwasa	"María"	Nominees: Kang Daniel - "Who U Are"; Sunmi - "pporappippam"; Jessi - "Nunu Nana"; Taemin - "Criminal"
2021	BTS	"Butter"	Nominees: Stray Kids – "Thunderous"; NCT 127 – "Sticker"; NCT Dream – "Hot Sauce"; Seventeen – "Ready to Love"; Shinee – "Don't Call Me"
2021	Aespa	"Next Level"	Nominees: Itzy – "In the Morning"; Oh My Girl – "Dun Dun Dance"; Red Velvet – "Queendom"; STAYC – "ASAP"; Twice – "Alcohol-Free"
2021	Rosé	"On The Ground"	Nominees: Baekhyun – "Bambi"; Hyuna – "I'm Not Cool"; Lisa – "Lalisa"; Jeon Somi – "Dumb Dumb"; Taeyeon – "Weekend"
2022	Seventeen	"Hot"	Nominees: NCT 127 - "2 Baddies"; NCT Dream – "Glitch Mode"; Stray Kids – "Maniac"; Tomorrow X Together – "Good Boy Gone Bad"; Treasure – "Jijkin"
2022	Ive	"Love Dive"	Nominees: (G)I-dle – "Tomboy"; Blackpink – "Pink Venom"; Le Sserafim – "Fearless"; NewJeans – "Attention"; Red Velvet – "Feel My Rhythm"
2022	Psy	"That That" (feat. Suga)	Nominees: Jessi – "Zoom"; Nayeon – "Pop!"; Sunmi – "Heart Burn"; Yena – "Smiley"
2023	Seventeen	"Super"	Nominees: NCT 127 - "Ay-Yo"; NCT Dream – "Candy"; Stray Kids – "S-Class"; Tomorrow X Together – "Sugar Rush Ride"; Zerobaseone – "In Bloom"
2023	NewJeans	"Ditto"	Nominees: (G)I-dle – "Queencard"; Aespa – "Spicy"; Ive – "I Am"; Le Sserafim – "Unforgiven" (feat. Nile Rodgers); STAYC – "Teddy Bear"
2023	Jungkook	"Seven" (feat. Latto)	Nominees: Jimin – "Like Crazy"; Kai – "Rover"; Taeyang – "Vibe" (feat. Jimin); Taeyong – "Shalala"
2023	Jisoo	"Flower"	Nominees: Hwasa – "I Love My Body"; Jeon Somi – "Fast Forward"; Jihyo – "Killin' Me Good"; Lee Chae-yeon – "Knock"
2024	TWS	"Plot Twist"	Nominees: Enhypen - "Sweet Venom"; NCT 127 – "Fact Check"; Riize – "Love 119"; Seventeen – "God of Music"; Stray Kids – "Lalalala"
2024	Aespa	"Supernova"	Nominees: (G)I-dle – "Super Lady"; Illit – "Magnetic"; Ive – "Baddie"; Le Sserafim – "Easy"; NewJeans – "How Sweet"
2024	Jungkook	"Standing Next to You"	Nominees: Jimin – "Who"; Key – "Pleasure Shop"; Taemin – "Guilty"; Taeyong – "Tap"
2024	Jennie	"You & Me"	Nominees: Hwasa – "Na"; Nayeon – "ABCD"; Sunmi – "Balloon in Love"; Yuqi – "Freak"
2025	Seventeen	"Thunder"	Nominees: BoyNextDoor – "If I Say, I Love You"; NCT Dream – "When I'm With You"; NCT Wish – "Poppop"; Plave – "Dash"; Riize – "Fly Up"; TWS – "Countdown!"
2025	Aespa	"Whiplash"	Nominees: Babymonster – "Drip"; Blackpink – "Jump"; Illit – "Cherish (My Love)"; Ive – "Rebel Heart"; Le Sserafim – "Hot"
2025	G-Dragon	"Too Bad" (feat. Anderson .Paak)	Nominees: J-Hope – "Mona Lisa"; Kai – "Wait on Me"; Key – "Hunter"; Mark – "1999"
2025	Jennie	"Like Jennie"	Nominees: Dayoung – "Body"; Minnie – "Her"; Jisoo – "Earthquake"; Karina – "Up"

== Gallery of winners ==
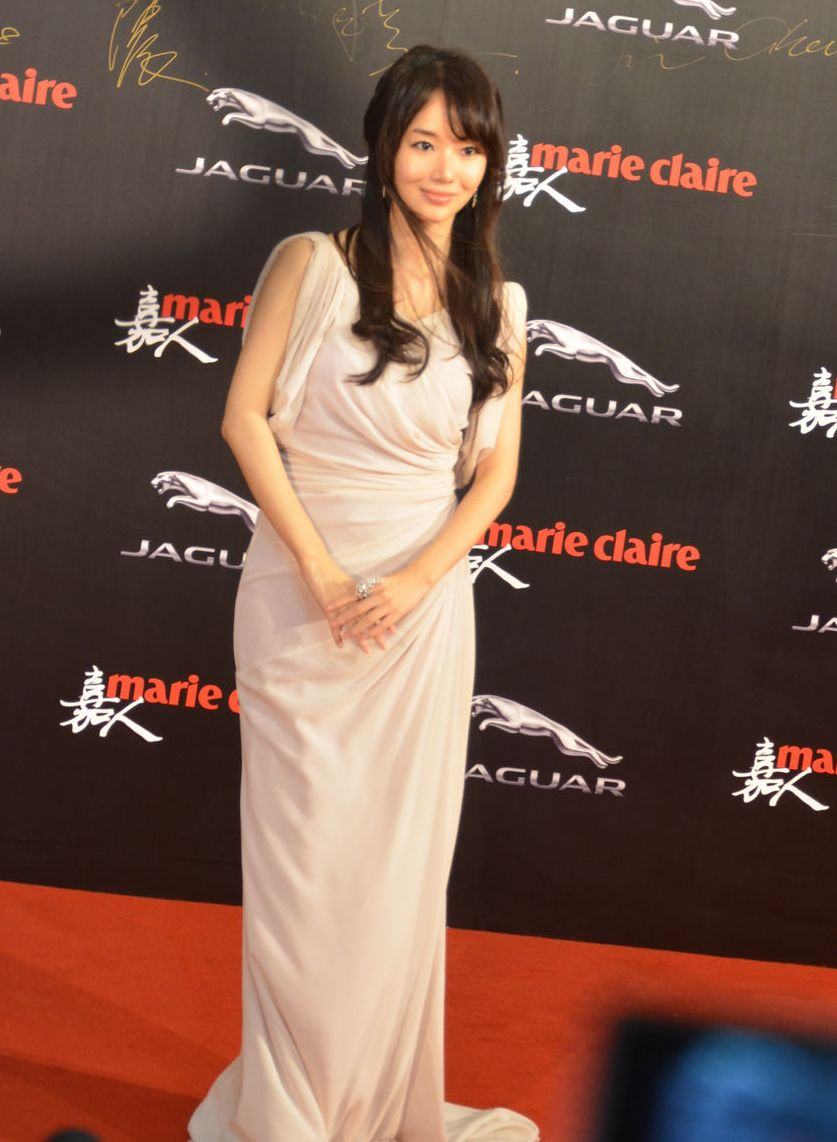
Lee Jung-hyun (1999)

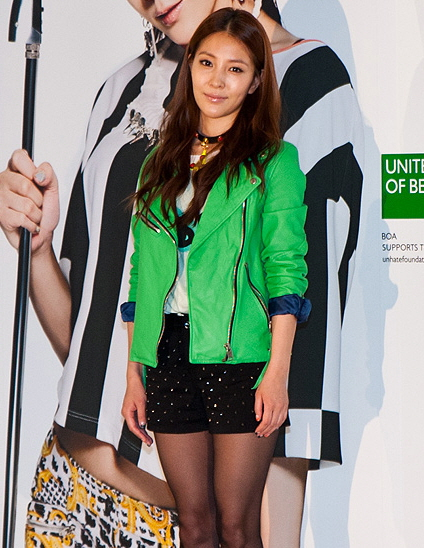
BoA (2002–2003)

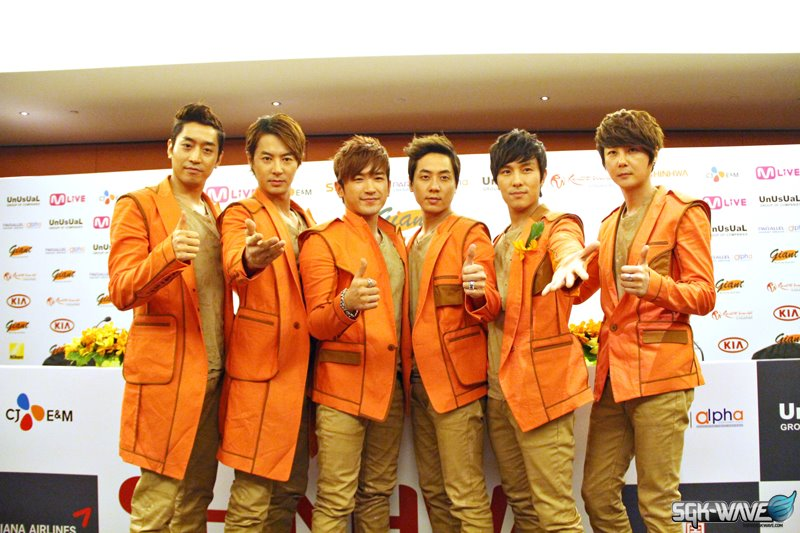
Shinhwa (2004)

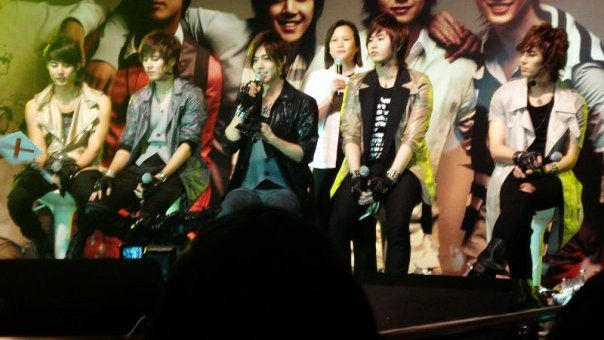
SS501 (2006)

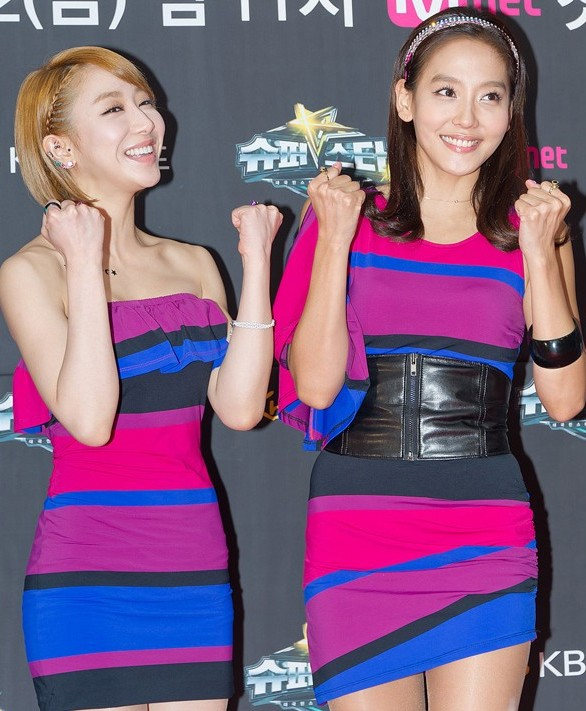
The Grace (2007)

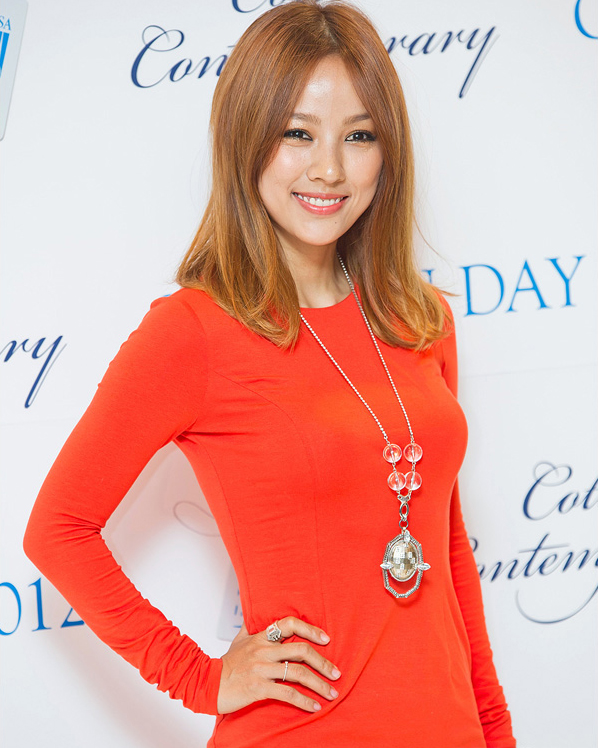
Lee Hyori (2008)

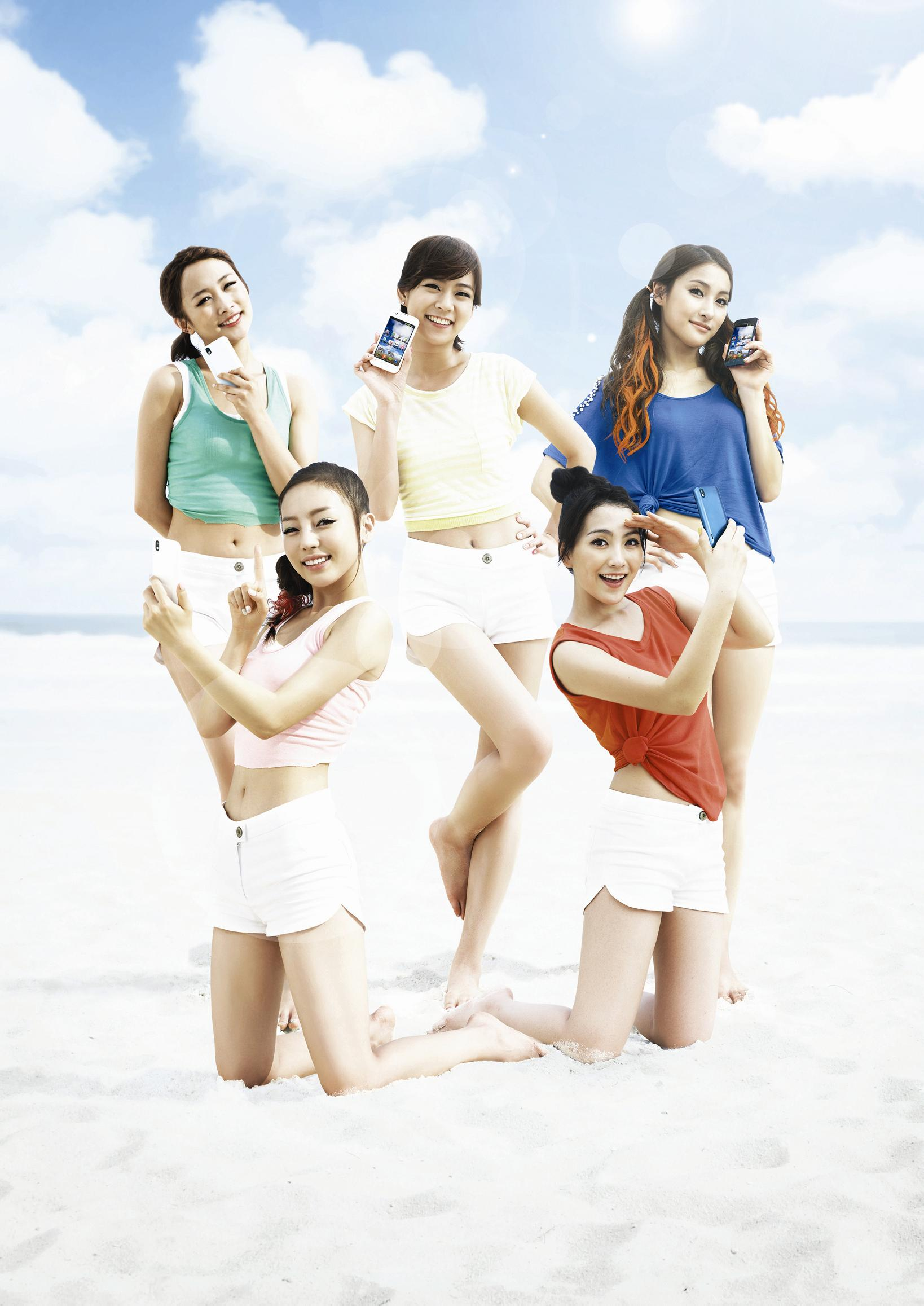
Kara (2009)

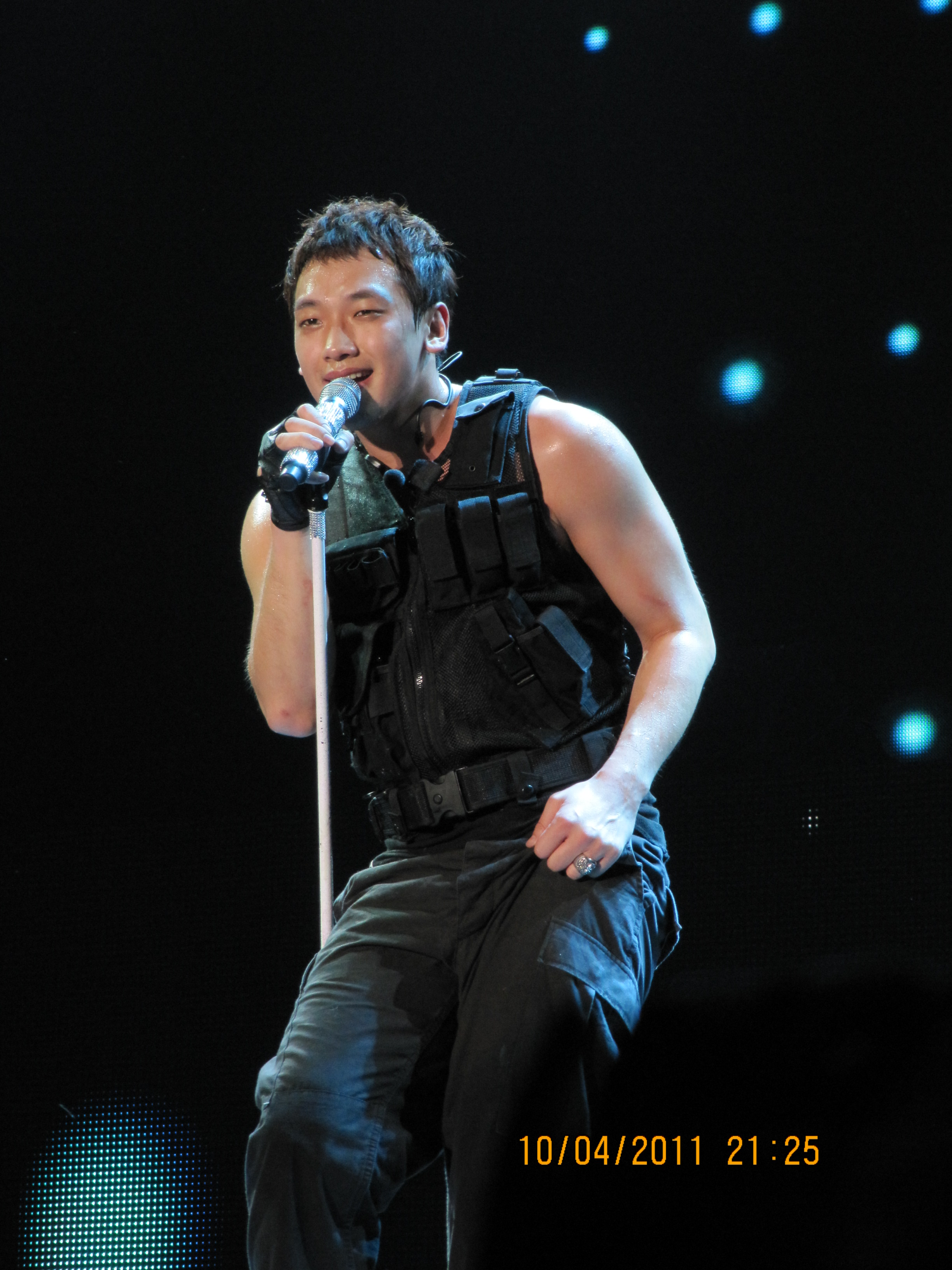
Rain (2010)

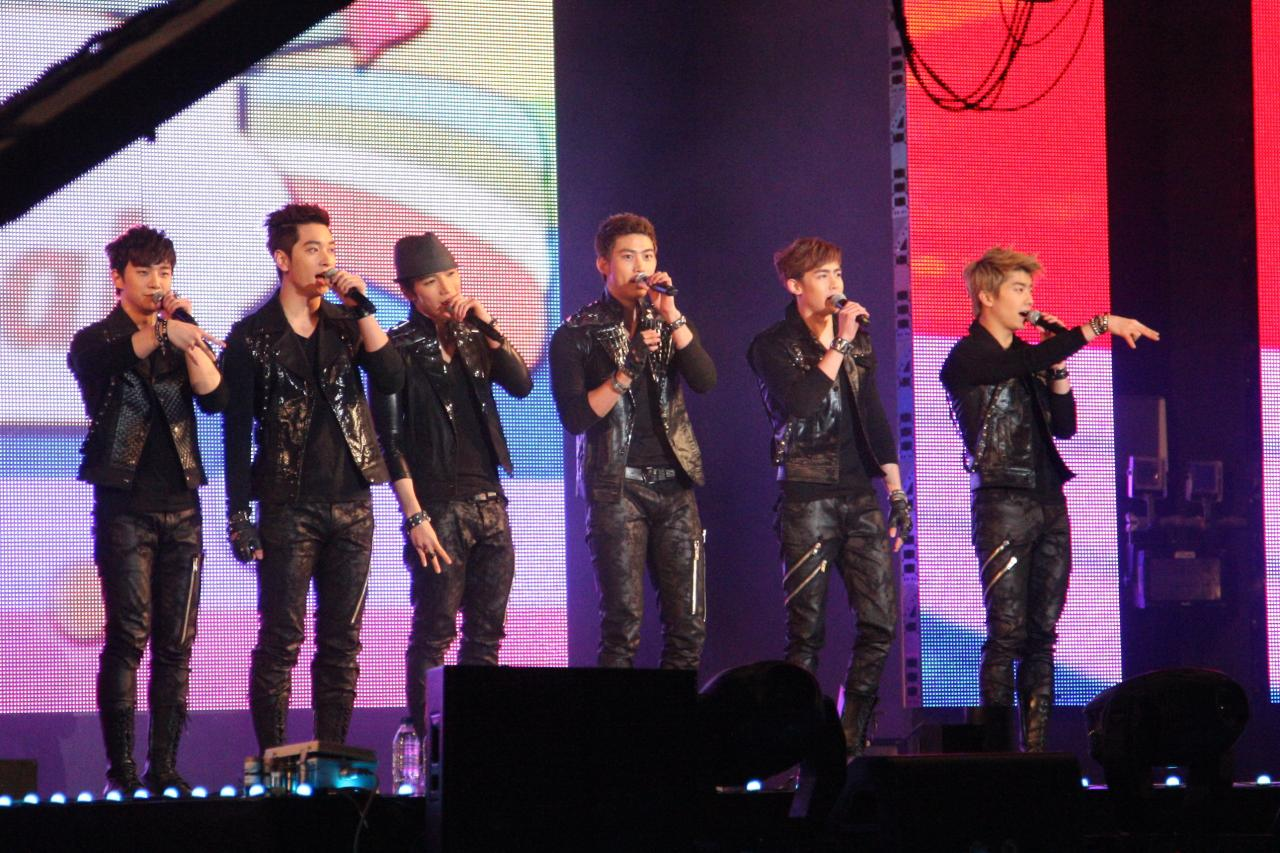
2PM (2010)

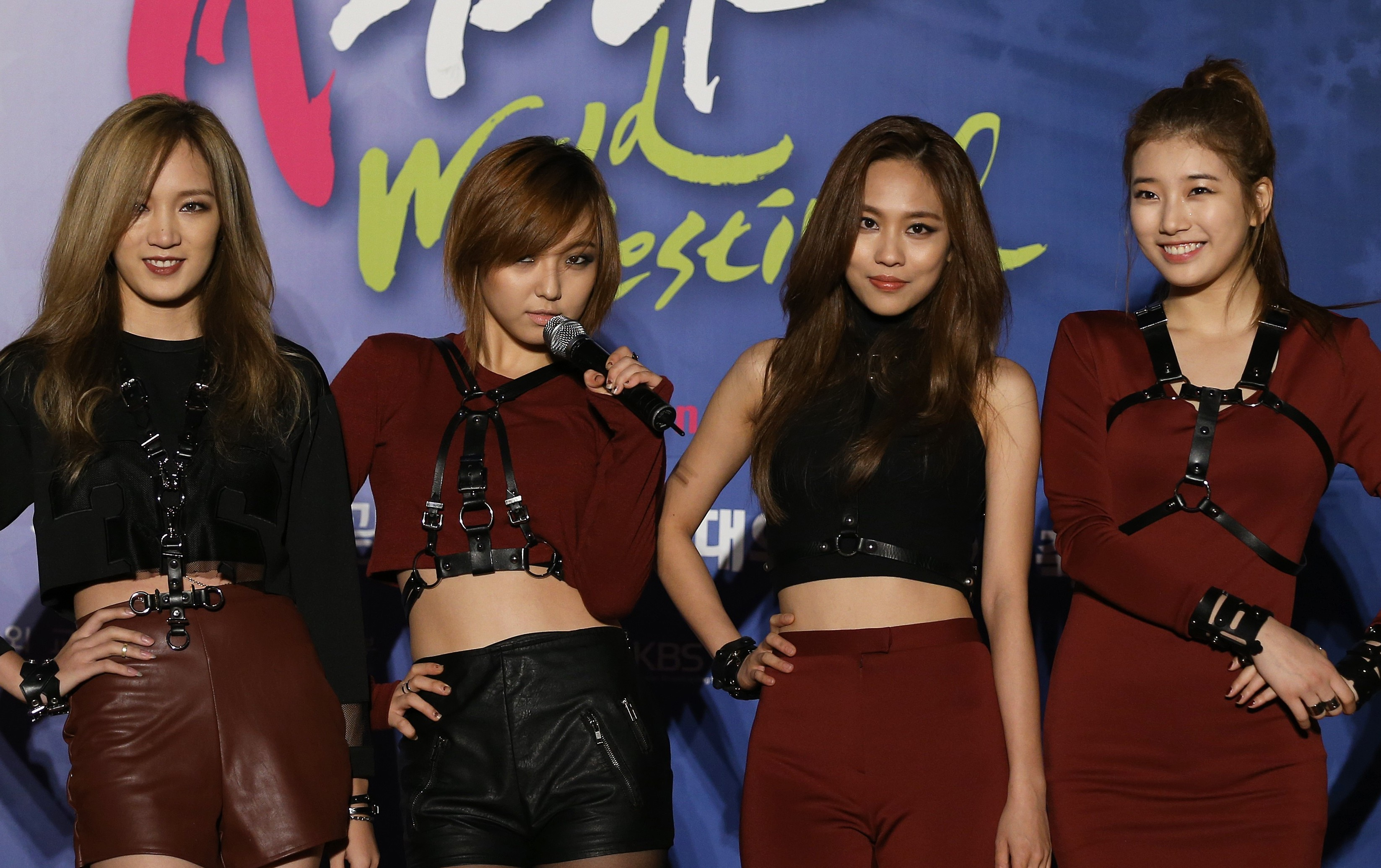
Miss A (2010–2011)

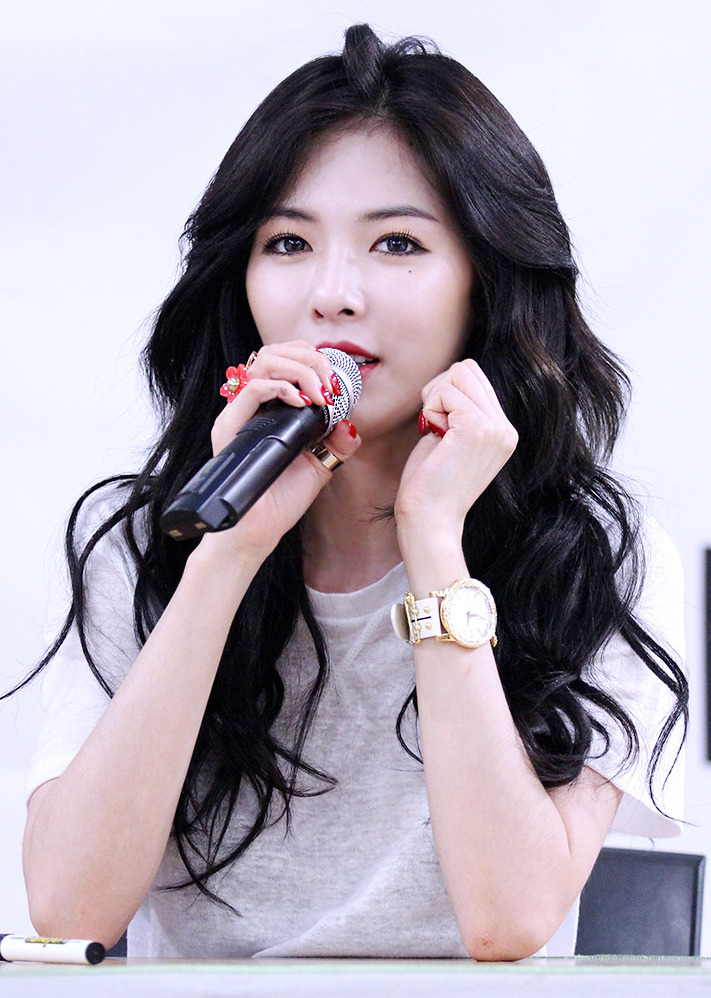
Hyuna (2011, 2015)

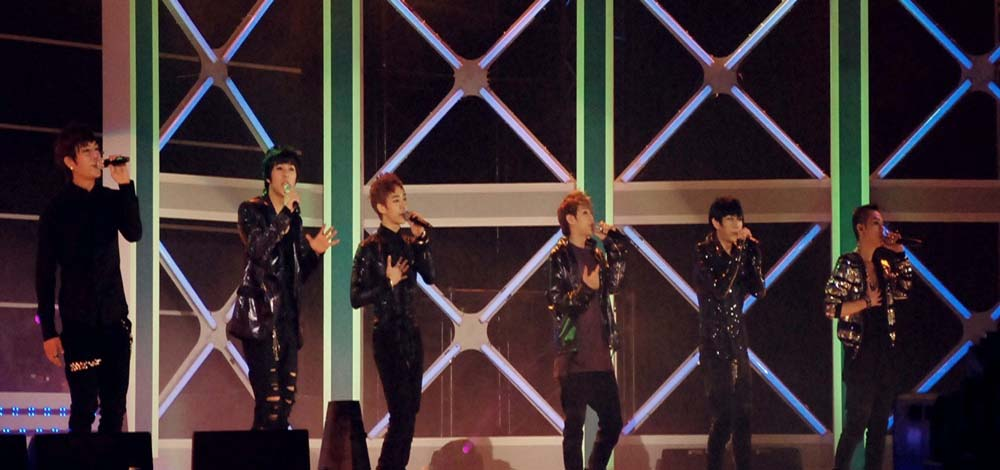
Beast (2011)

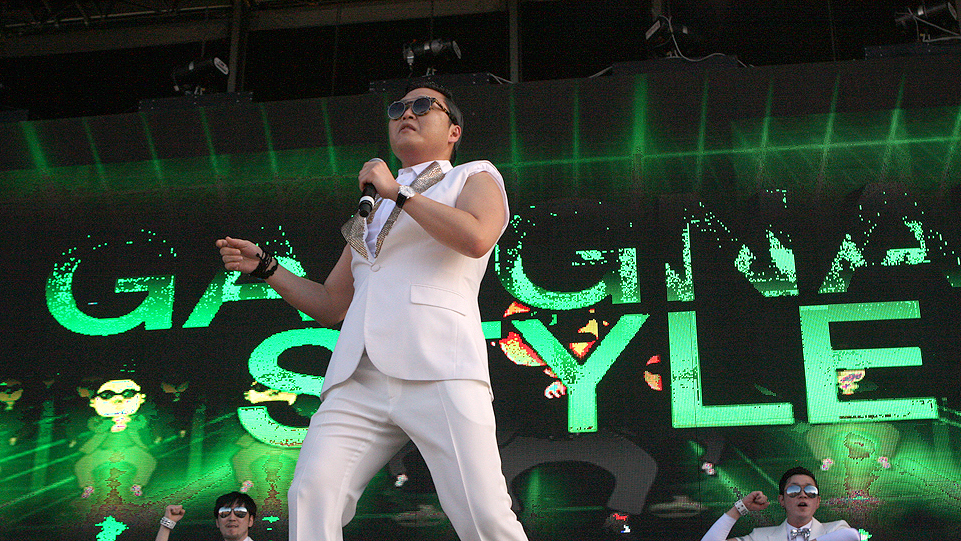
Psy (2012, 2022)

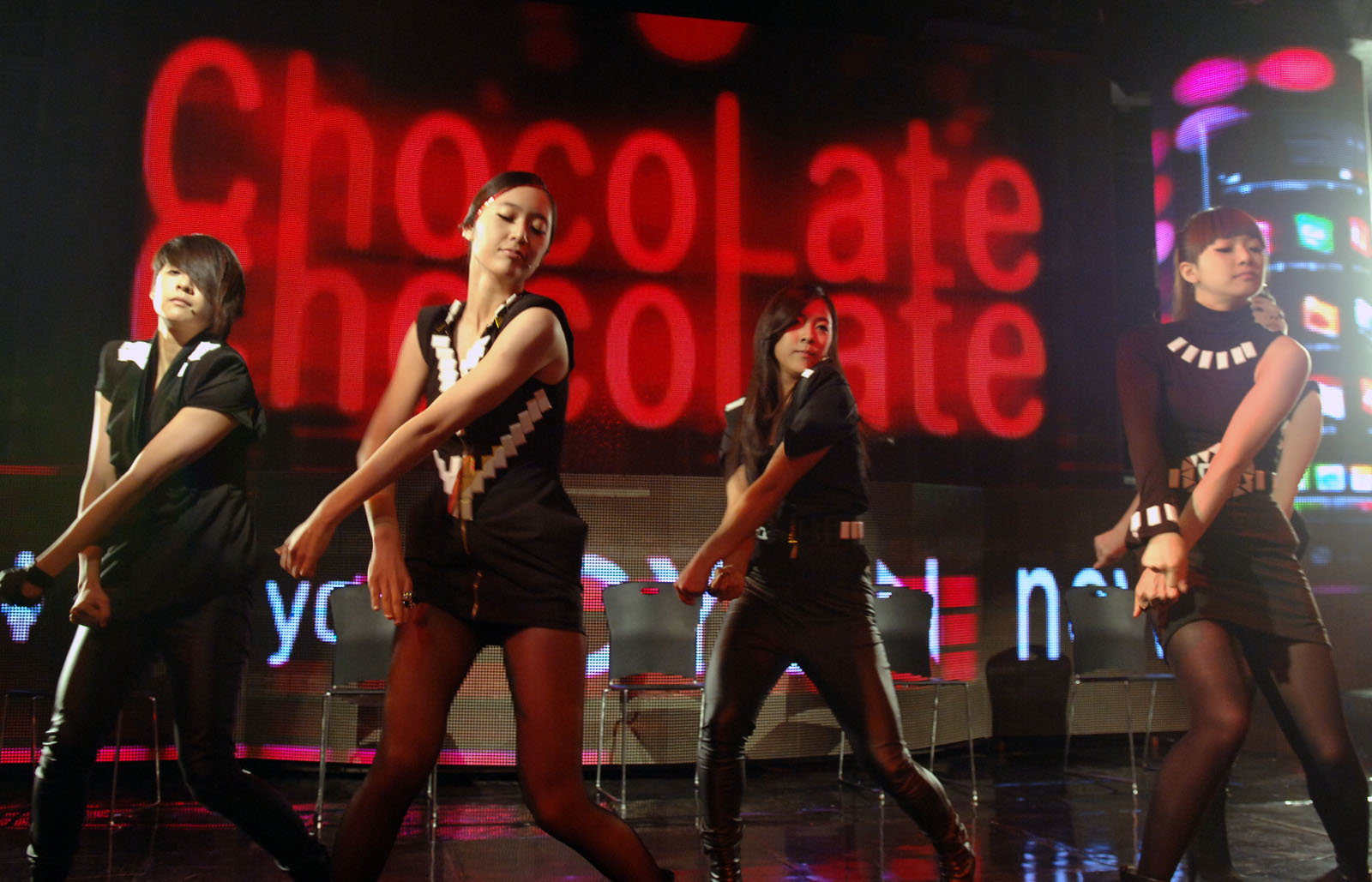
f(x) (2012)

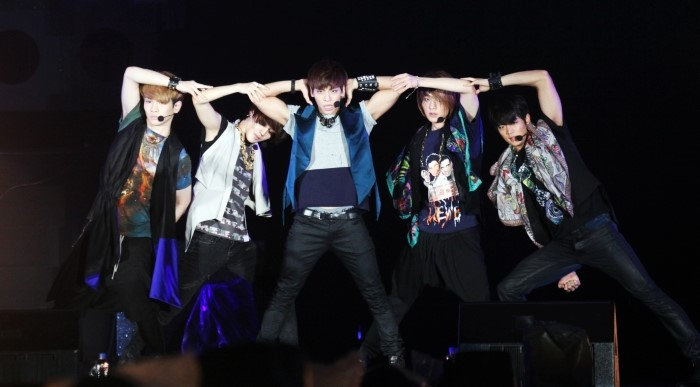
Shinee (2012–2013, 2015)

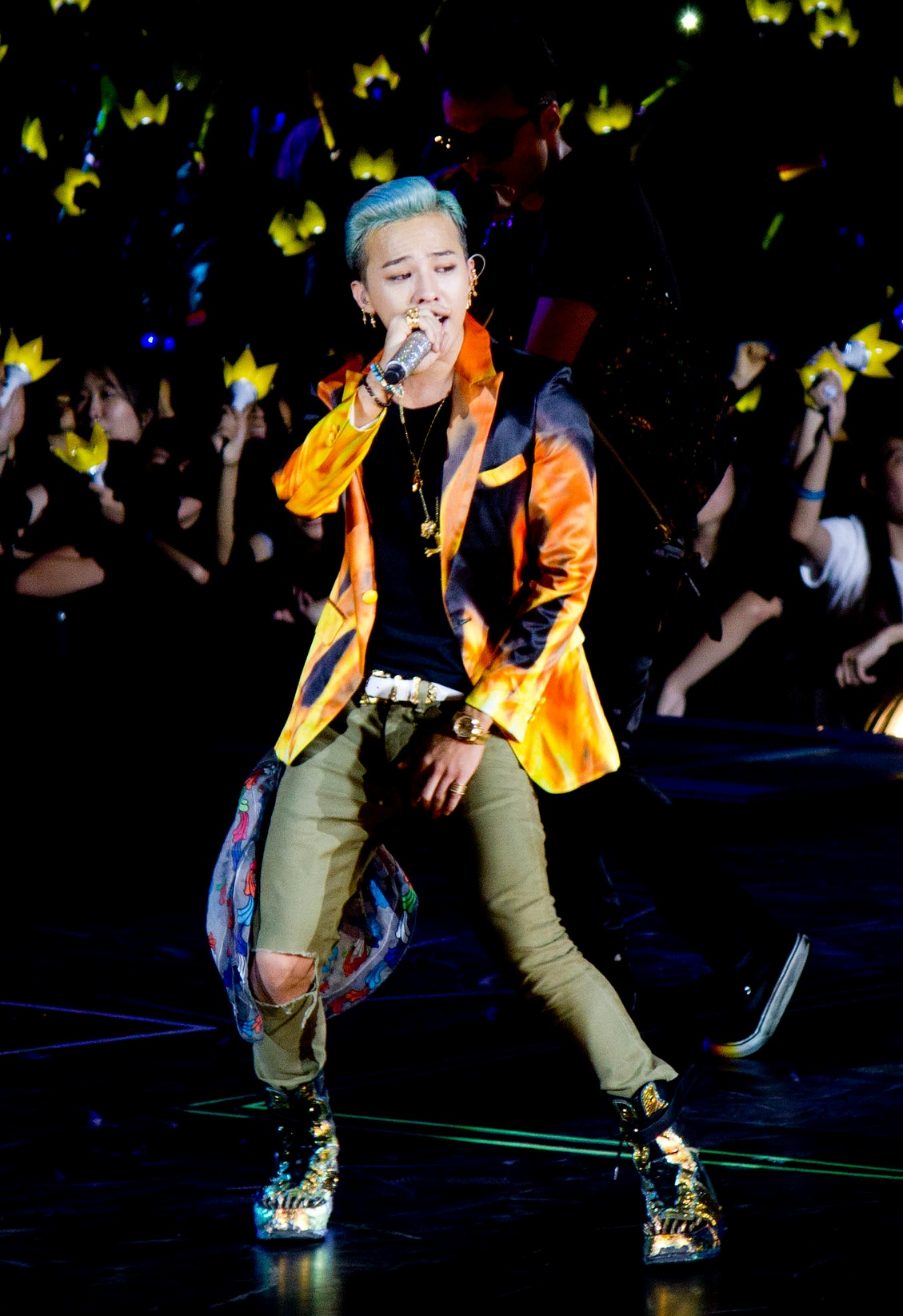
G-Dragon (2013, 2025)

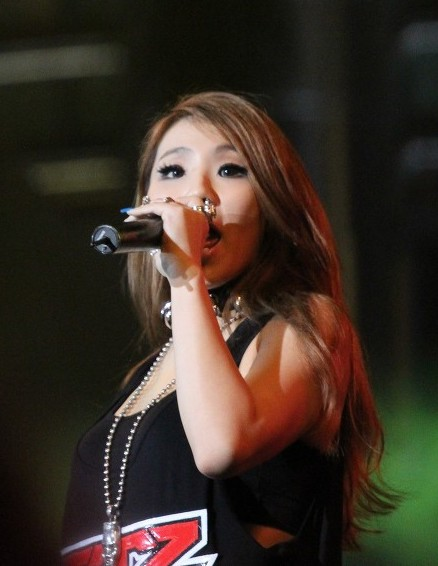
CL (2013)

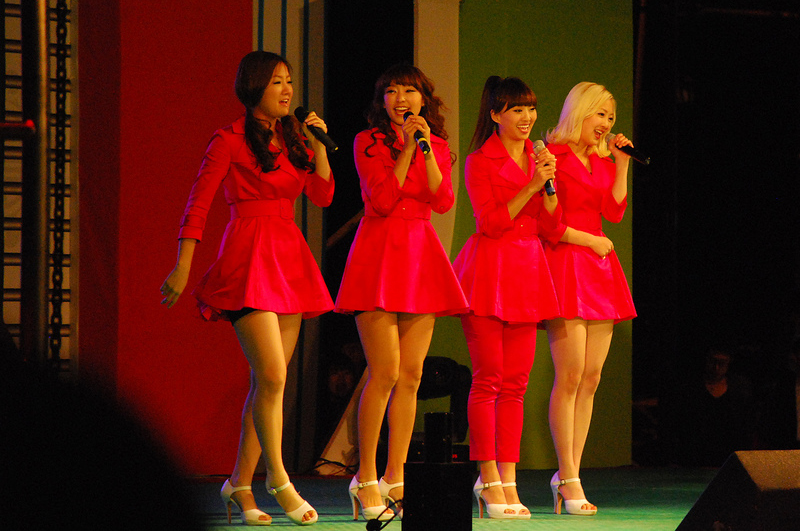
Sistar (2013)

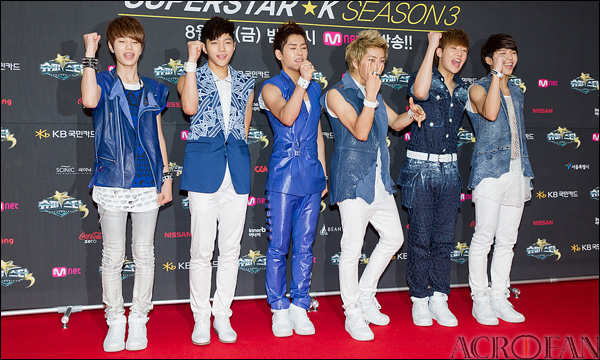
Infinite (2014)

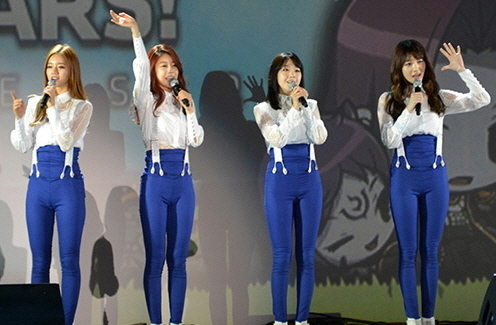
Girl's Day (2014)

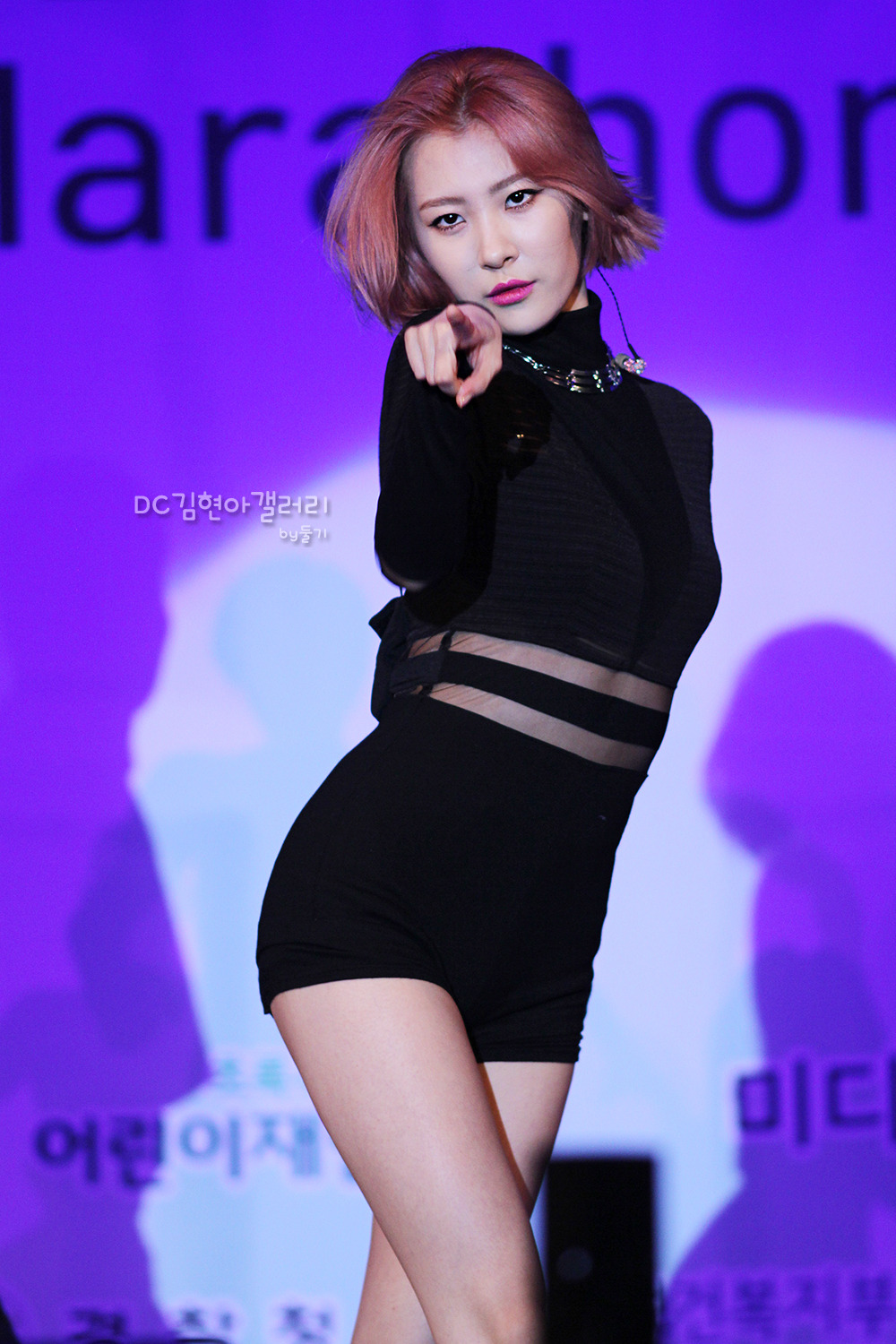
Sunmi (2014)

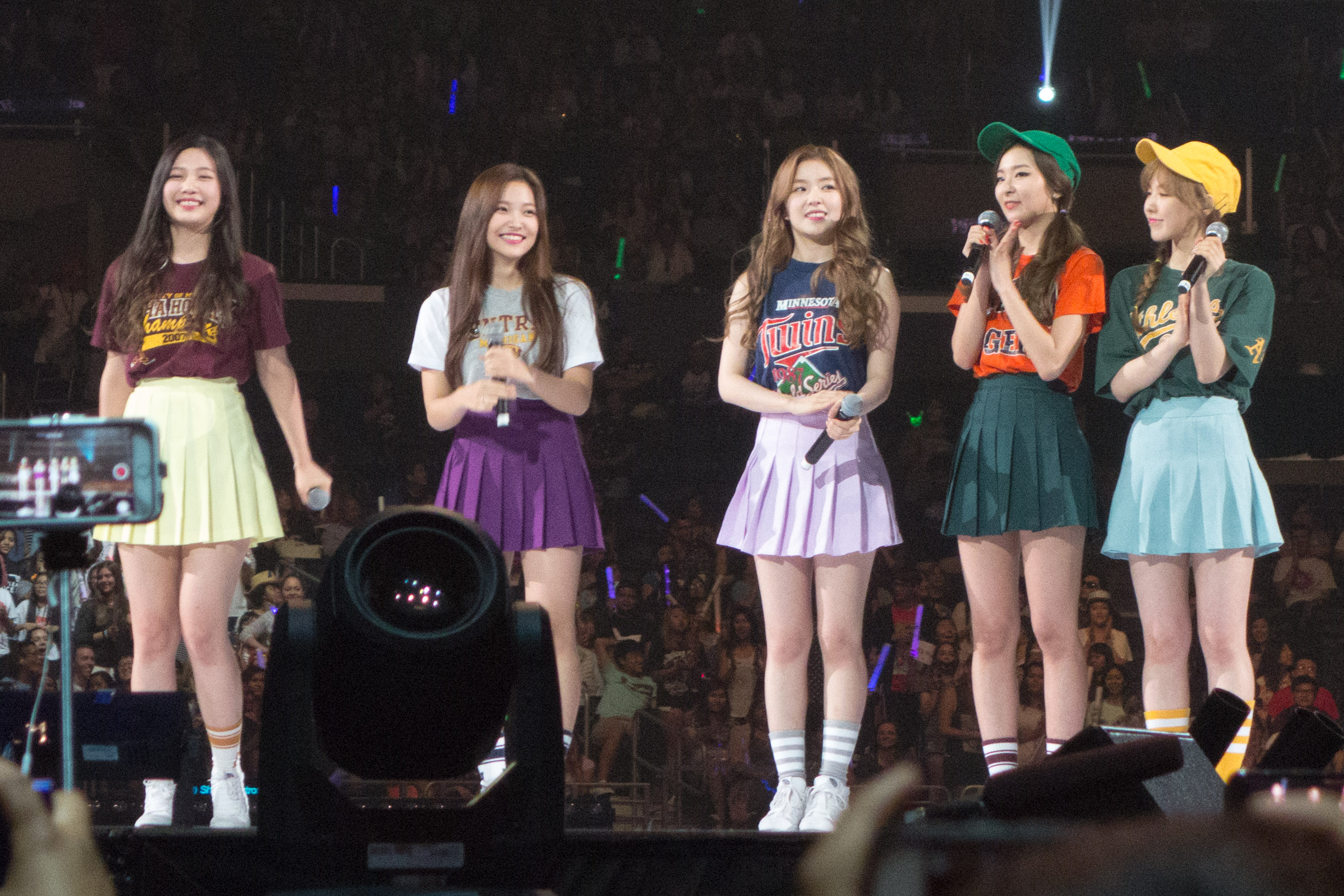
Red Velvet (2015)

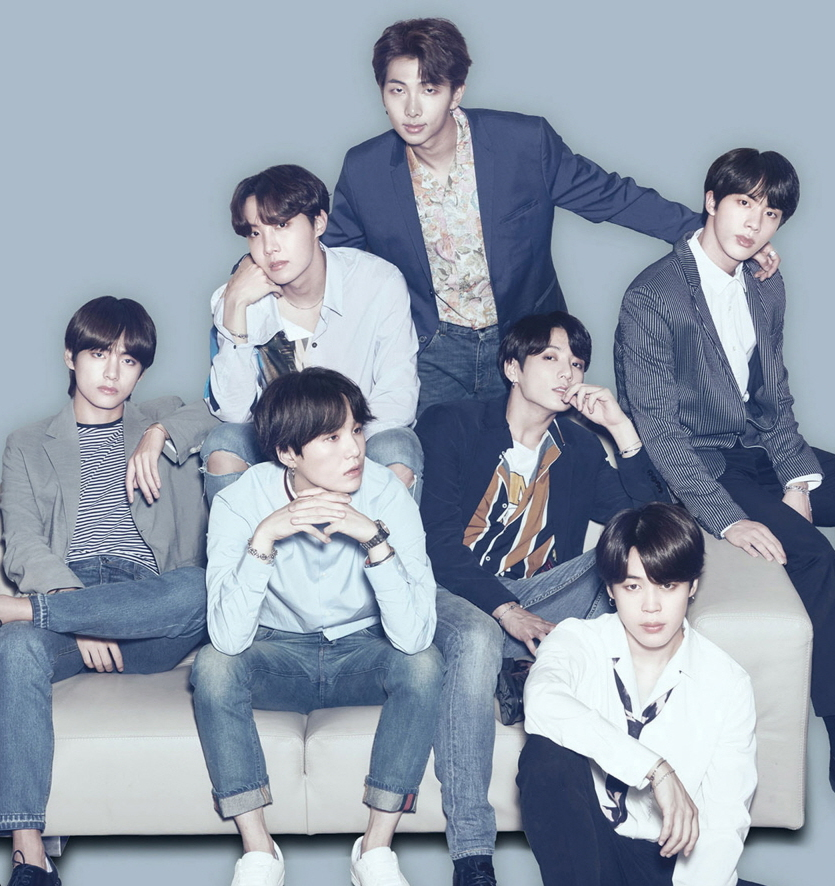
BTS (2016, 2019–21)

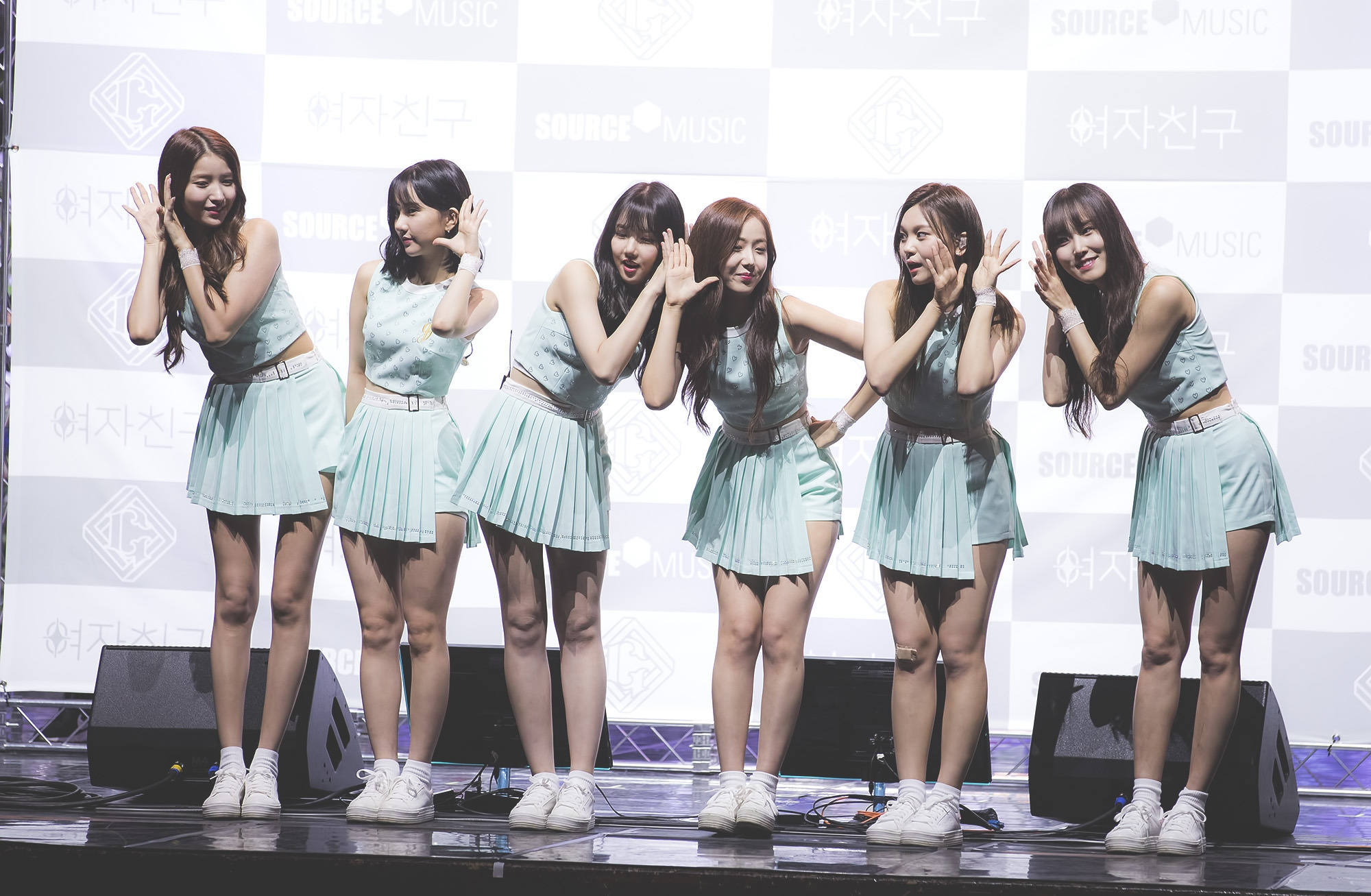
GFriend (2016)

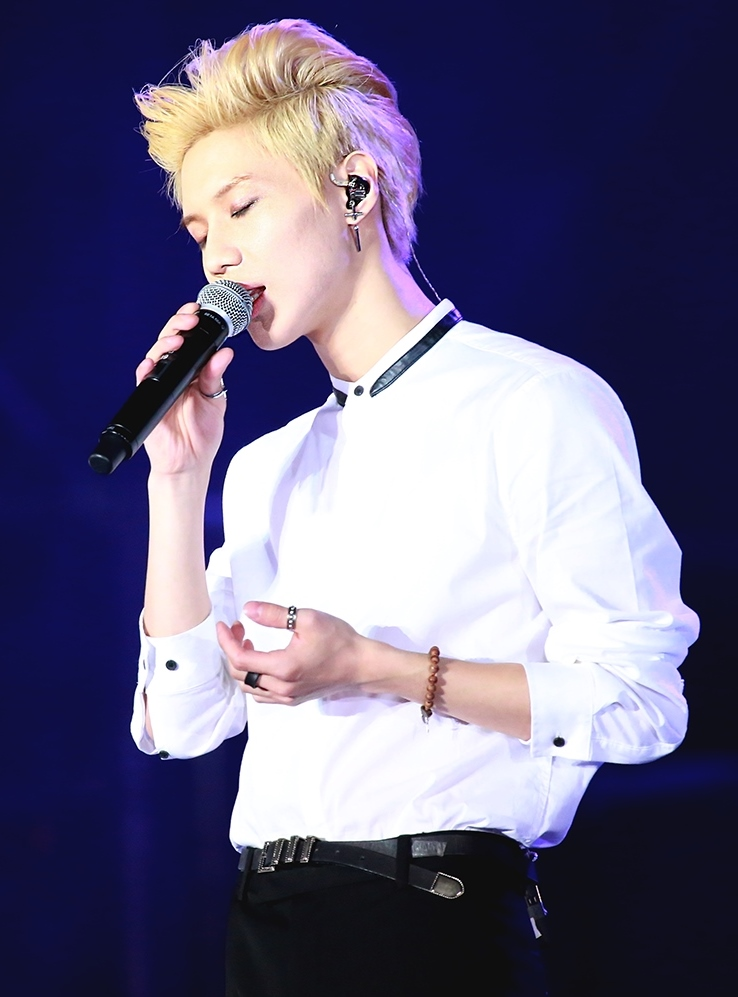
Taemin (2016–2017)

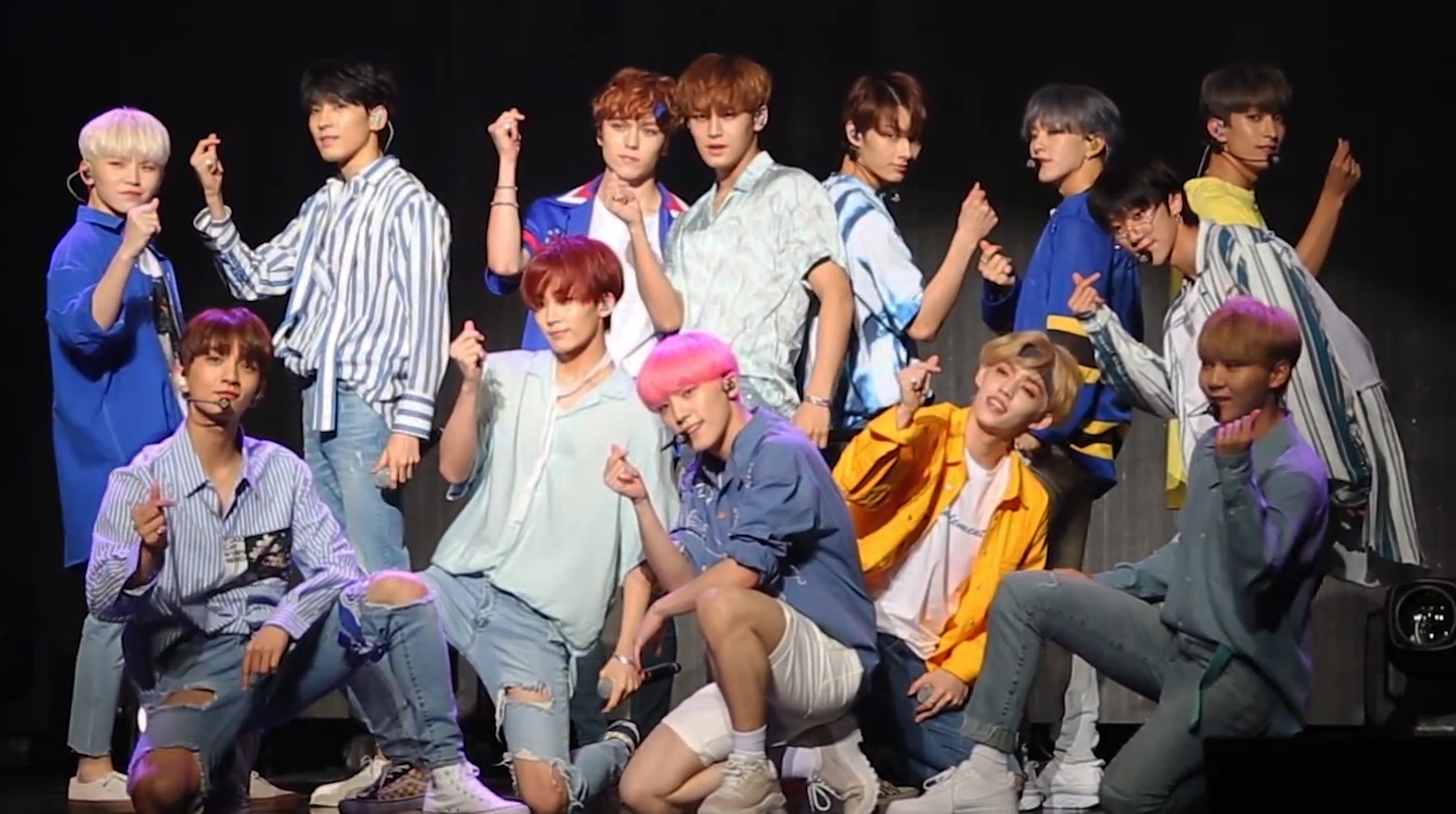
Seventeen (2017–2018, 2022-2023, 2025)

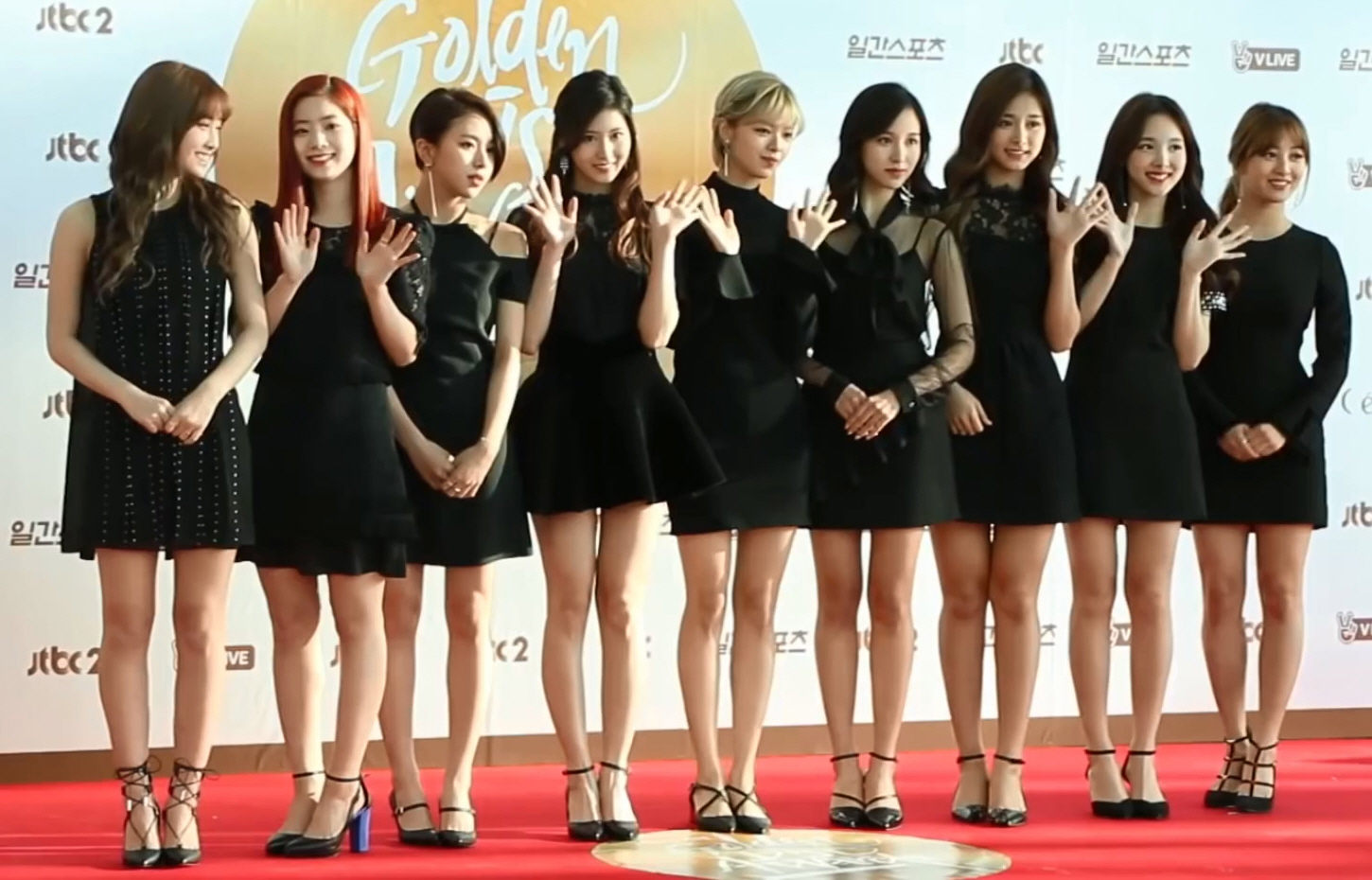
Twice (2017–2019)

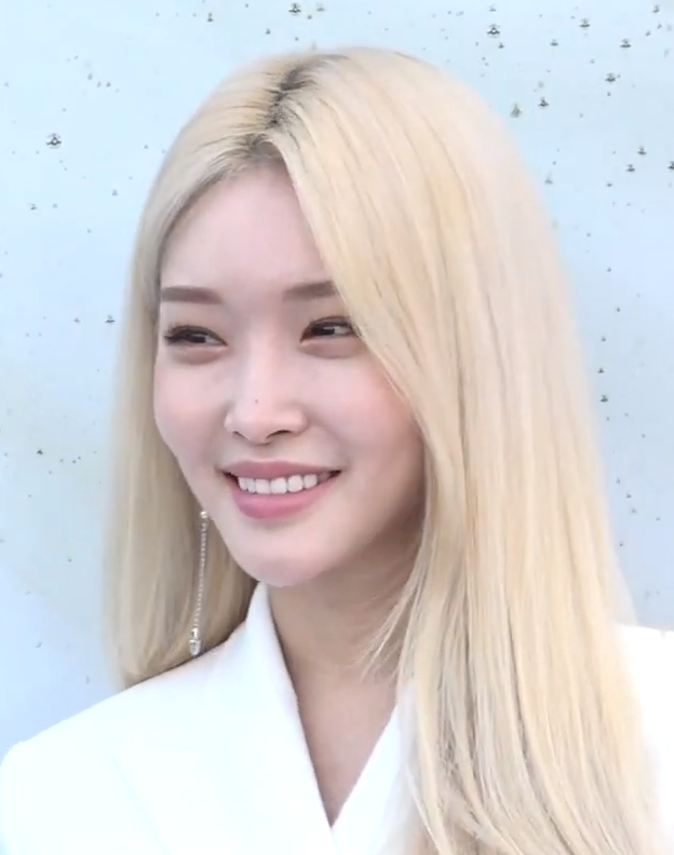
Chung Ha (2018–2019)

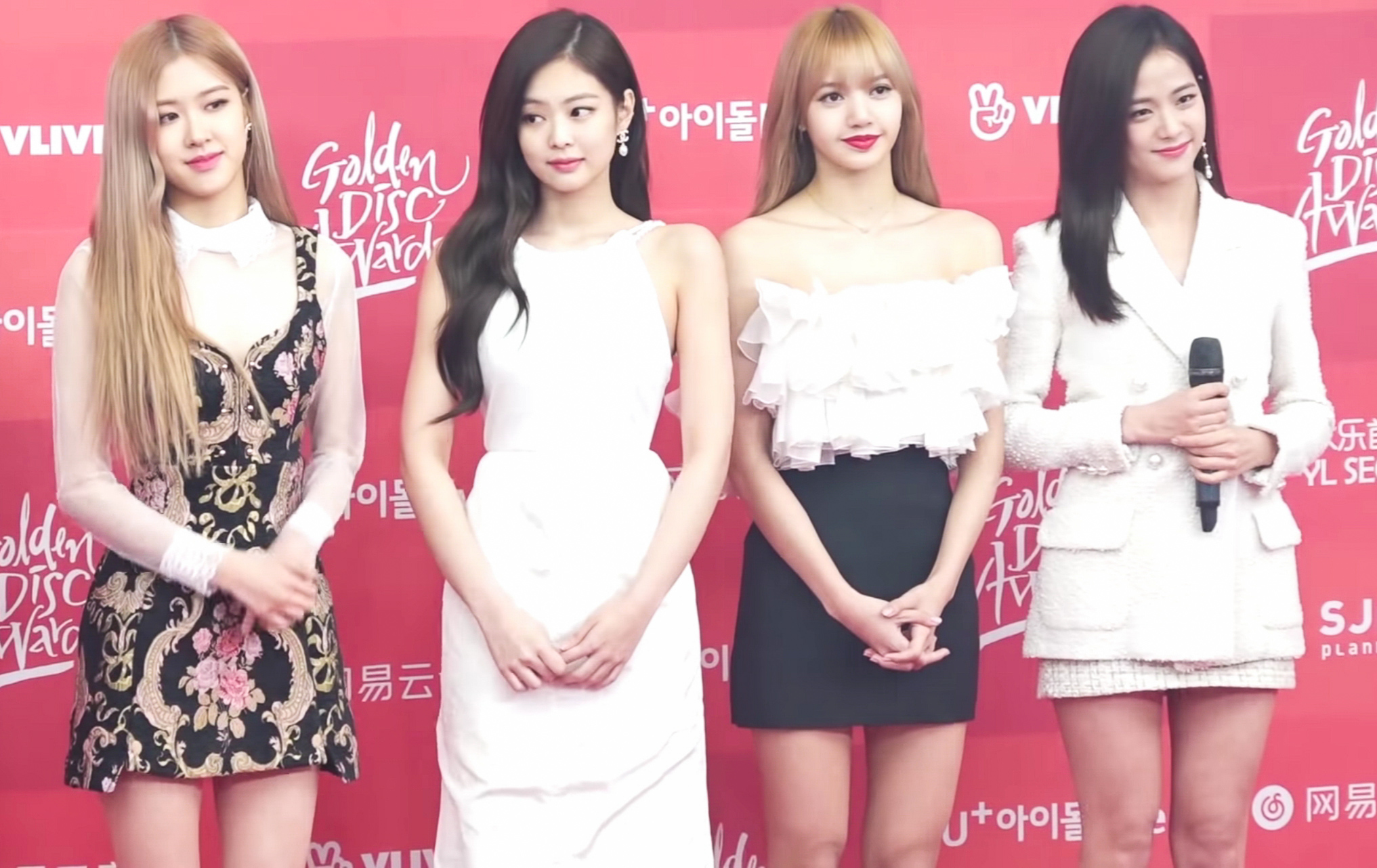
Blackpink (2020)

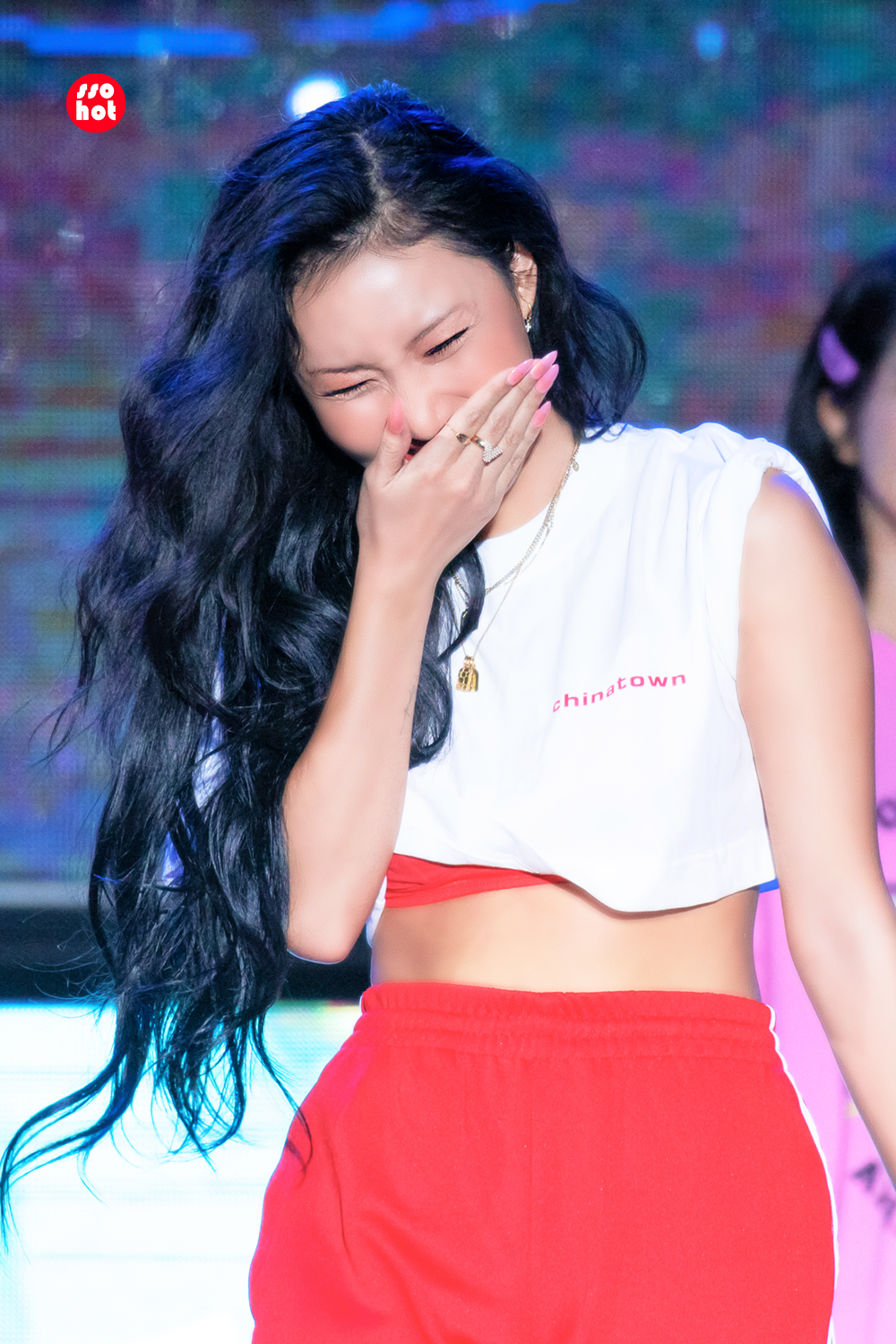
Hwasa (2020)

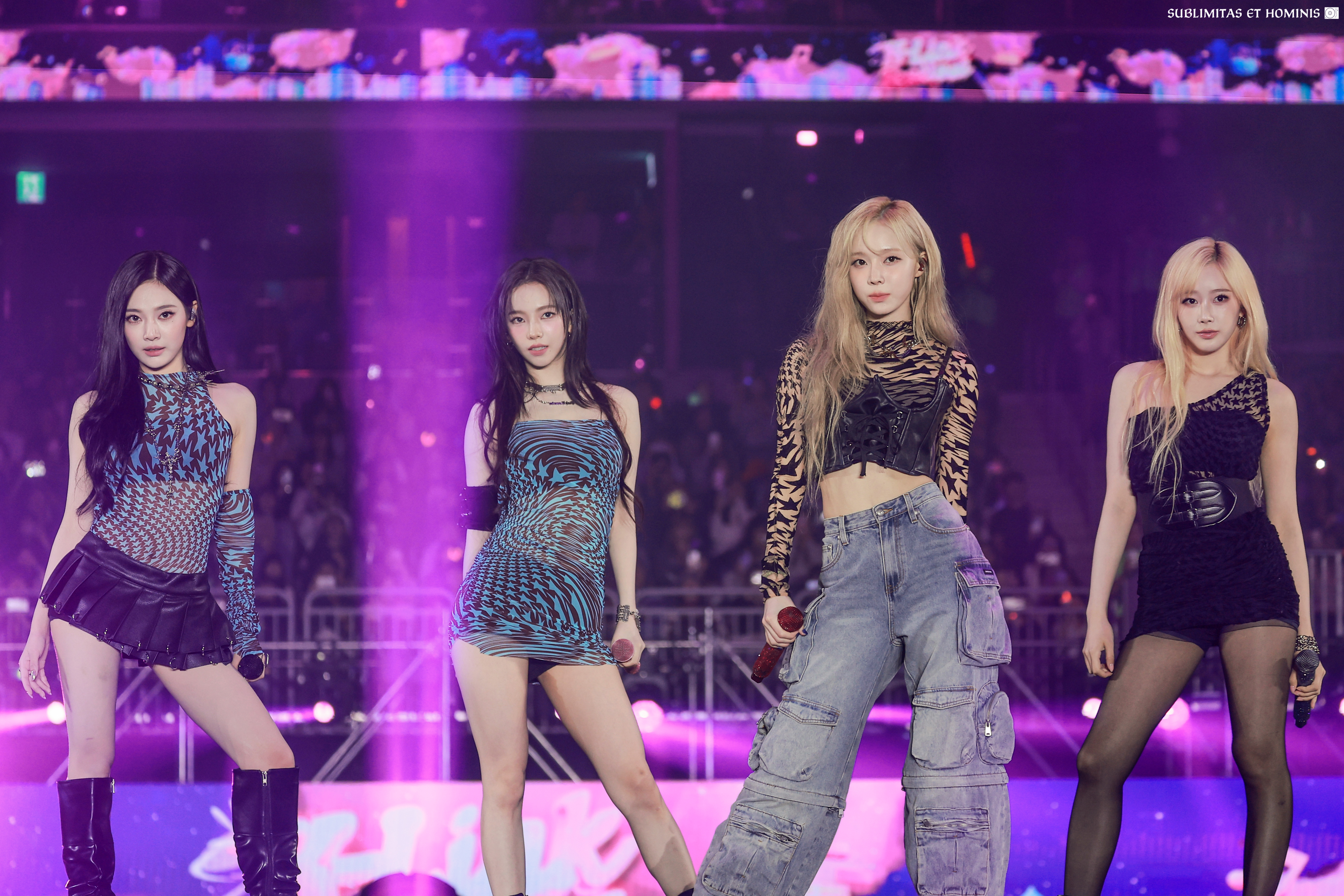
Aespa (2021, 2024–2025)

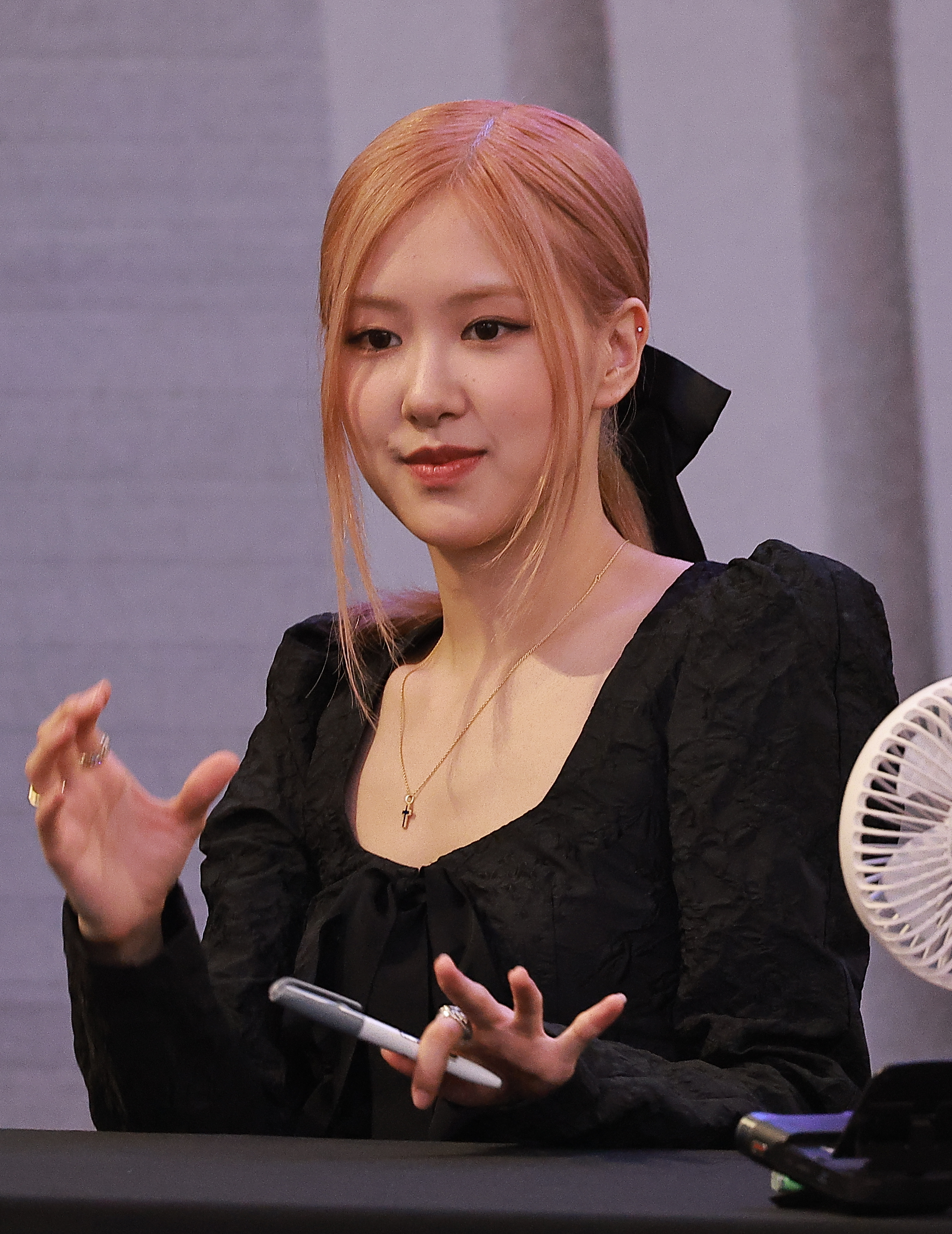
Rosé (2021)

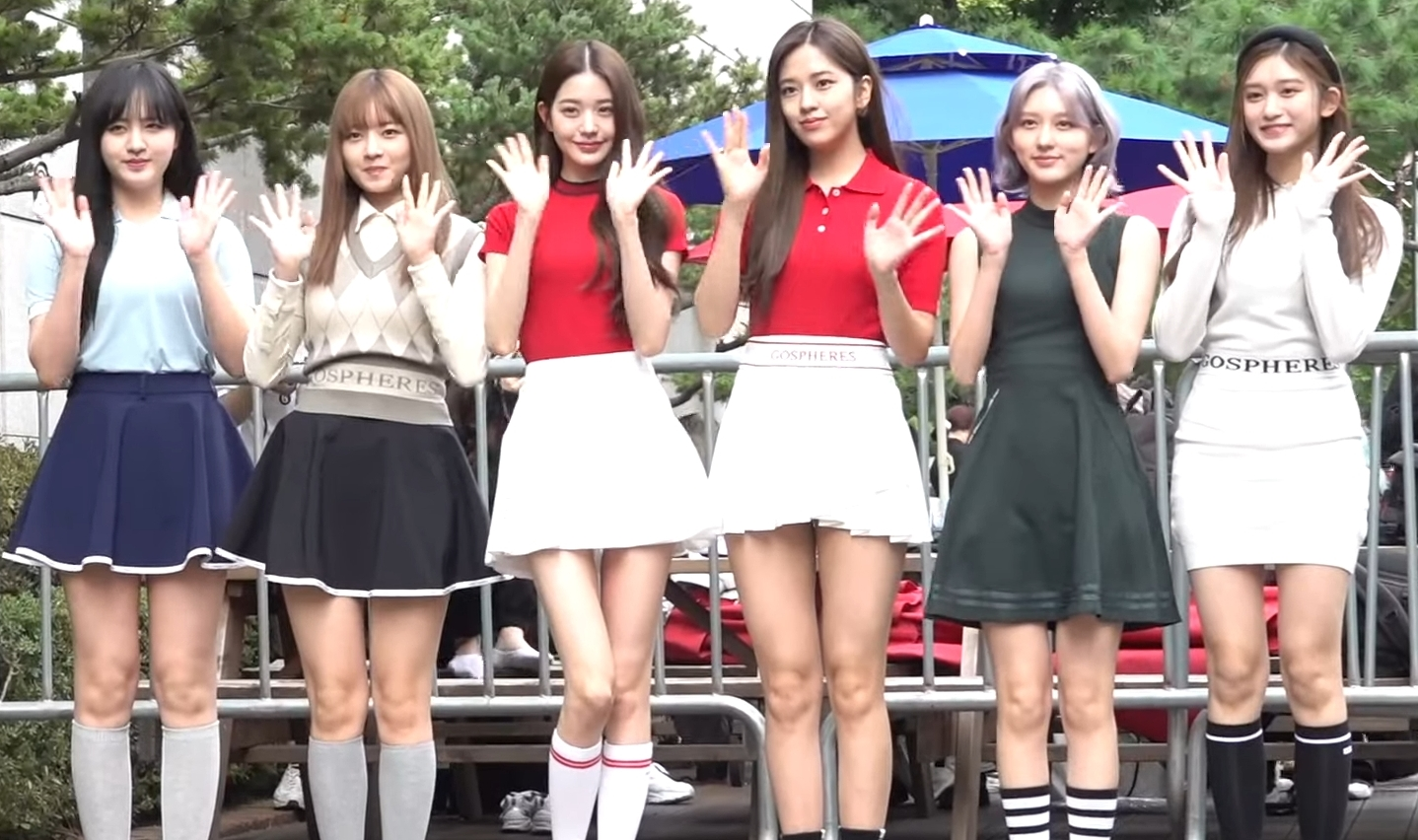
Ive (2022)

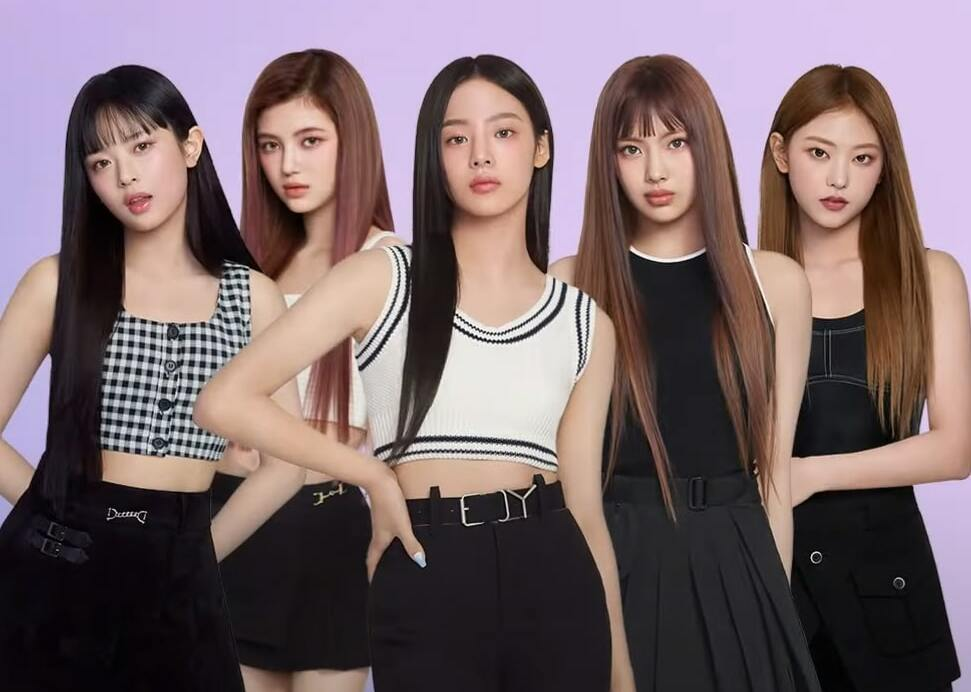
NewJeans (2023)

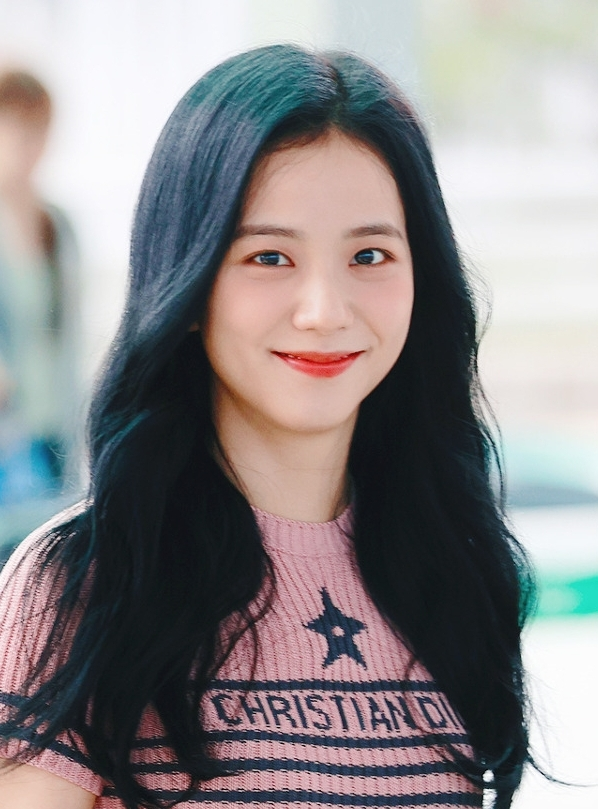
Jisoo (2023)

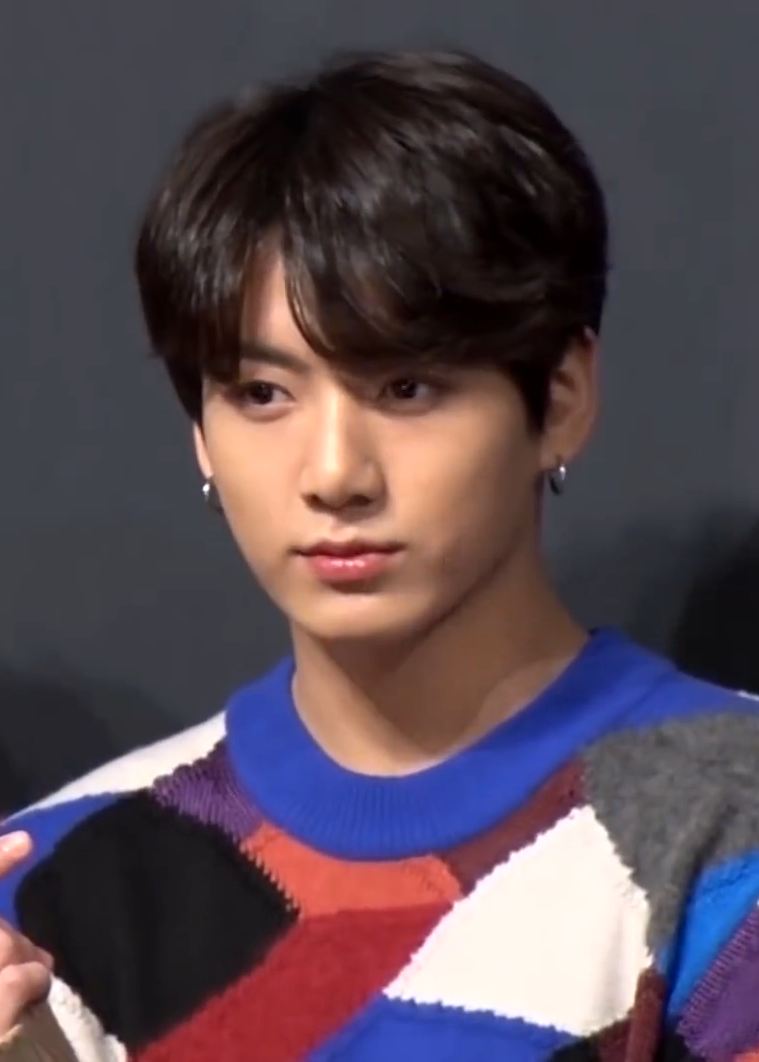
Jungkook (2023–2024)

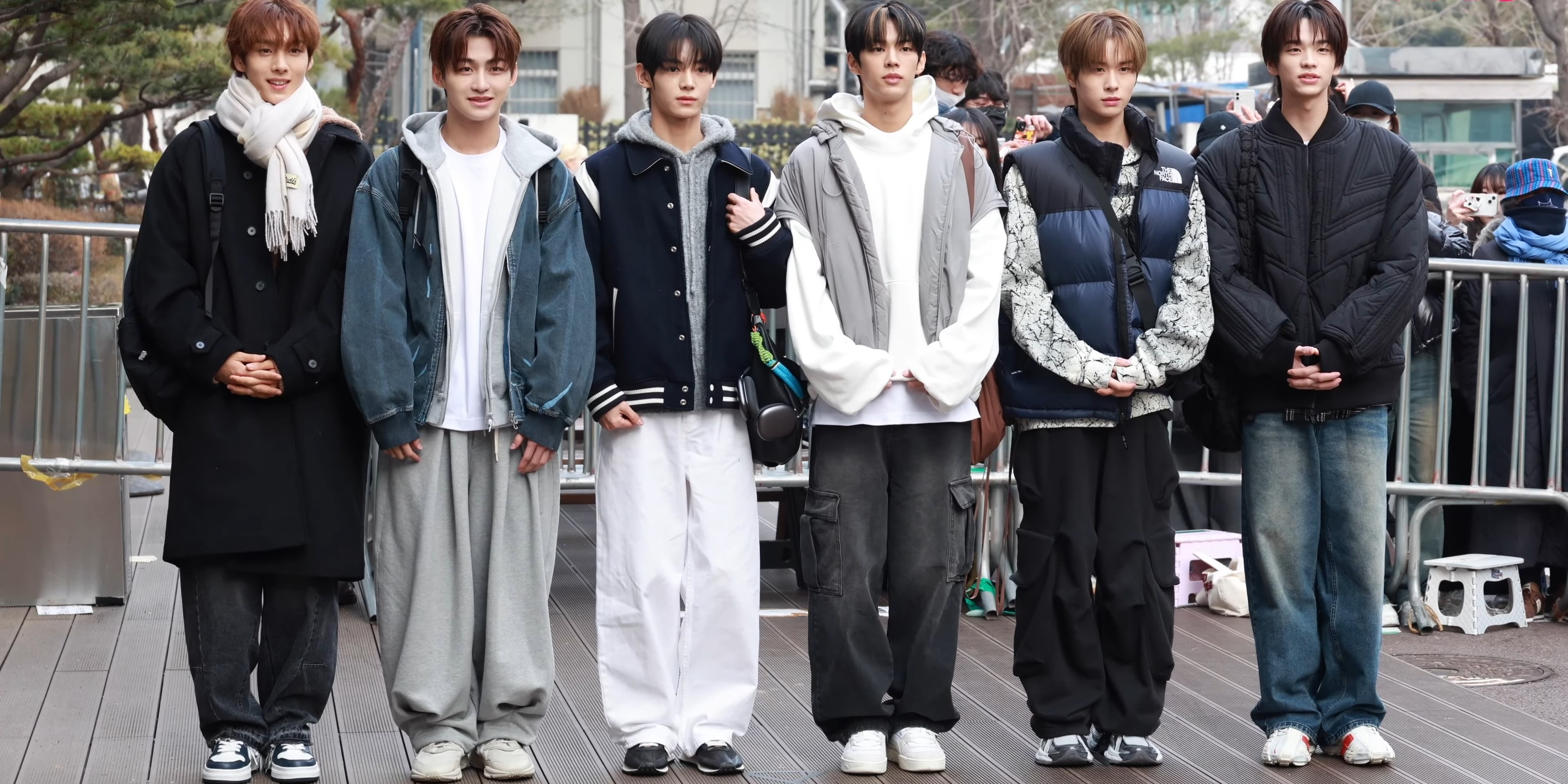
TWS (2024)

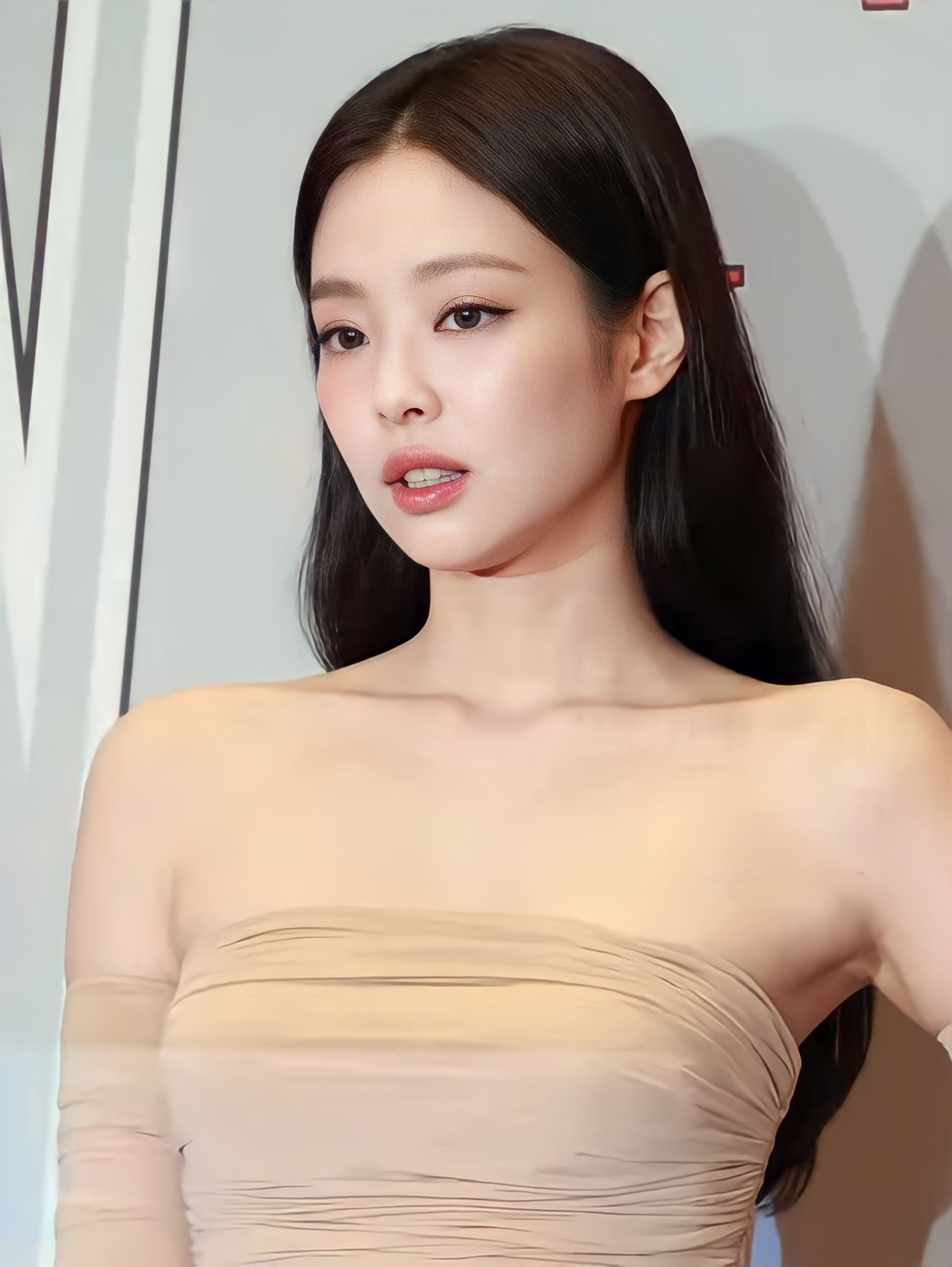
Jennie (2024–2025)

== Multiple awards ==
As of 2025 (27th MAMA), fourteen artists received the title two or more times.

Artist(s)	Record Set	First year awarded	Recent year awarded
Seventeen	5	2017	2025
BTS	4	2016	2021
Shinee	3	2012	2015
Twice	3	2017	2019
Aespa	3	2021	2025
Hyuna	2	2011	2015
Miss A	2	2010	2011
BoA	2	2002	2003
Taemin	2	2016	2017
Chung Ha	2	2018	2019
Psy	2	2012	2022
Jungkook	2	2023	2024
G-Dragon	2	2013	2025
Jennie	2	2024	2025
