= Exology Chapter 1: The Lost Planet =

- Digital cover

Live album by Exo
- Released: December 22, 2014
- Recorded: May 23–24, 2014
- Venue: Jamsil Arena (Seoul)
- Studios: In Grid (Seoul); Lead (Seoul); SM Big Shot (Seoul); SM Blue Cup (Seoul); SM Blue Ocean (Seoul); SM Booming System (Seoul); SM Concert Hall (Seoul); SM Yellow Tail (Seoul); Sound Pool (Seoul)
- Genres: K-pop; hip hop; R&B
- Length: 54:57
- Languages: Korean; Mandarin; English
- Labels: SM; KT
- Producer: Lee Soo-man

Exo chronology
Overdose (2014)	Exology Chapter 1: The Lost Planet (2014)	Exodus (2015)

Singles from Exology Chapter 1: The Lost Planet
- 1. "December, 2014 (The Winter's Tale)" Released: December 19, 2014

Exology Chapter 1: The Lost Planet (stylized as EXOLOGY CHAPTER 1: THE LOST PLANET) is the first live album by South Korean–Chinese boy band Exo. It was released on December 22, 2014 by SM Entertainment. It features 2 CDs and a total of 36 songs (1 CD and 18 songs), including individual tracks from each of the members and studio versions of some of his songs remixed (remix Korean and Mandarin/Mandarin and Korean). The album was released in two versions: a regular version and a special version.

== Track listing ==
=== CD 1 ===
Normal version
No.	Title	Length
1.	"The Lost Planet (live)"	4:29
2.	"Haka (live)"	0:45
3.	"Mama (rearranged) (live)"	4:26
4.	"Let Out the Beast (live)"	3:33
5.	"I'm Lay (Lay solo) (live)"	1:12
6.	"Moonlight (live)" (Hangul:월광)	4:27
7.	"Delight (Chanyeol solo)"	1:45
8.	"Angel (Live)" (너의 세상으로)	3:02
9.	"Black Pearl (rearranged) (live)"	3:09
10.	"Up Rising (Chen solo) (live)"	1:45
11.	"XOXO (Kisses & Hugs) (live)"	3:14
12.	"Beat Maker (Sehun solo) (live)"	1:32
13.	"Love, Love, Love (rearranged) (live)"	3:44
14.	"Thunder (Live)"	3:12
15.	"Tell Me What Is Love (D.O. Solo) (live)"	1:49
16.	"My Lady (live)"	3:33
17.	"My Turn to Cry (Baekhyun Solo) (live)"	1:25
18.	"Baby Don't Cry (live)"	4:04
Total length:		51:16

=== CD 2 ===
Special version
No.	Title	Length
1.	"Machine (live)" (기계)	2:41
2.	"Breakin' Machine (Xiumin solo) (live)"	1:05
3.	"3.6.5 (live)"	3:08
4.	"History (live)"	3:31
5.	"Beautiful (Suho solo) (live)"	1:31
6.	"Peter Pan (live)" (Hangul:피터팬)	3:53
7.	"Metal (Tao solo) (live)"	1:25
8.	"Deep Breath (Kai solo) (live)"	1:28
9.	"Overdose (live)" (중독)	3:28
10.	"Wolf - The Legend Begins (live)"	0:37
11.	"Wolf (live)" (늑대와 미녀)	3:52
12.	"Growl (live)" (으르렁)	3:28
13.	"Lucky (live)"	3:29
14.	"Black Pearl (rearranged) [studio version] (bonus track)"	3:09
15.	"Love, Love, Love (acoustic version) [bonus track]"	3:46
16.	"Wolf (Stage Version) [studio version] (bonus track)" (늑대와 미녀)	4:16
17.	"Growl (stage version) [studio version] (bonus track)" (으르렁)	5:29
18.	"December, 2014 (The Winter's Tale) (bonus track)"	3:37
Total length:		54:06

Notes: The bonus track is "Black Pearl (rearranged) (studio version)", "Love, Love, Love (acoustic version) (studio version)", "Wolf (stage version) (studio version)", "Growl (stage version) (studio version)" and "December, 2014 (The Winter's Tale)".

== Charts ==
=== Weekly charts ===
Chart (2014)	Peak position
South Korean Albums (Gaon)	1
Japanese Albums (Oricon)	22

=== Monthly charts ===
Chart (2014)	Peak position
South Korean Albums (Gaon)	1

== Sales ==
Region	Sales
South Korea (Gaon)	80,000+
Japan (Oricon)	10,568+

== Awards and nominations ==
=== Music program awards ===
Song	Program	Date
"December, 2014 (The Winter's Tale)"	M Countdown (Mnet)	January 1, 2015
"December, 2014 (The Winter's Tale)"	Music Bank (KBS)	January 2, 2015

== Release history ==
Release history for Exology Chapter 1: The Lost Planet
Region	Date	Format	Label	Ref
South Korea	December 22, 2014	CD	SM; KT	—
Various	December 22, 2014	Digital download; streaming	SM	—
Taiwan	January 30, 2015	CD	Avex Taiwan	
