= December, 2014 (The Winter's Tale) =

Single by Exo

from the album Exology Chapter 1: The Lost Planet
- Released: December 19, 2014
- Genre: K-pop; ballad
- Length: 3:35
- Label: SM; KT Music
- Composers: Adrian McKinnon; Mark Jackson
- Lyricist: January 8th
- Producers: Mark Q.; Rankin; Ryan S. Jhun; Kyle Coleman; Jayrah Gibson; Denzil Remedios

Exo singles chronology
"Overdose" (2014)	"December, 2014 (The Winter's Tale)" (2014)	"Call Me Baby" (2015)

"December, 2014 (The Winter’s Tale)" is a song by South Korean–Chinese boy band Exo, released on December 19, 2014, for their first live album Exology Chapter 1: The Lost Planet. It was the first single not to feature members Kris and Luhan due to their lawsuits months before.

== Background and release ==
On December 15, 2014, it was revealed that EXO will be releasing "December, 2014 (The Winter’s Tale)" through the mobile rhythm game SuperStar SMTOWN as an OST. A teaser of the song was also released on the same day. The song is recorded by D.O., Baekhyun and Chen with the lyrics of meeting the loved one again after going around the world.

== Reception ==
"December, 2014 (The Winter’s Tale)" debuted at number one on the Gaon Weekly Digital Chart, and at number fourteen at the Billboard World Digital Songs chart.

== Accolades ==
Music program awards
Program	Date
Music Bank	January 2, 2015

== Charts ==
=== Weekly charts ===
Chart (2014)	Peak position
South Korea (Gaon)	1
US World Digital Songs (Billboard)	14

=== Monthly charts ===
Chart (2014)	Peak position
South Korea (Gaon)	32

== Sales ==
Region	Sales
South Korea (Gaon)	176,154

== Release history ==
Release history for "December, 2014 (The Winter's Tale)"
Region	Date	Format	Label
Various	December 19, 2014	Digital download; streaming	SM; KT Music
