= Body (Dayoung song) =

Single by Dayoung

from the album Gonna Love Me, Right?
- Language: English; Korean
- Released: September 9, 2025
- Genre: Dance-pop
- Label: Starship Entertainment
- Songwriters: Jack Brady; Jordan Roman; DCF; Deza; Eric Nam; Exy
- Producer: The Wavys

Music video
- "Body" on YouTube

"Body" (stylized in all lowercase) is a song by the South Korean singer Dayoung. It was released under Starship Entertainment on September 9, 2025 as the lead single on her debut single album Gonna Love Me, Right? (stylized in all lowercase). Written and composed by Jack Brady, Jordan Roman, DCF, Deza, and Eric Nam, with Exy contributing lyrics as well, "Body" has been described as a "flirtatious" dance pop track. The song and its music video, which was filmed in Los Angeles, received acclaim from music critics and appeared in several year-end "Best of" lists from NME, Billboard, Teen Vogue, and other publications. The song was also nominated for Best Dance Performance – Female Solo and Song of the Year at the 2025 MAMA Awards.

== Background and composition ==
On September 9, 2025, South Korean singer Dayoung—a member of inactive Korean girl group WJSN—released her solo debut single album Gonna Love Me, Right? (stylized in all lowercase). It contains three tracks, including the lead single "Body." "Body" was released under Starship Entertainment.

Musically, "Body" has been described as a dance pop song with "bright" synths and a "muscular" bassline. Dayoung is credited for both lead and background vocals. Jack Brady, Jordan Roman, DCF, Deza, and Eric Nam wrote and composed the song, with Dayoung's WJSN bandmate Exy contributing to the lyrics. The Wavys produced and arranged the track. The song has been described as "flirtatious".

== Reception ==
"Body" received acclaim from critics. Carmen Chin of the British music magazine NME commended the song for its "radiant energy", writing that it "sparkles like sunlight at dusk". PopMatters' Evan Sawdey criticized the track's "surface-level" lyrics, but praised its "pounding" chorus and "effortless" execution. The Hollywood Reporter's Nicole Fell described the song as "the perfect example of an artist knowing what their sound should be". Billboard called the track "clean" and its chorus "addictive". Aeden Juvet of Stardust wrote that the song flows with "almost surgical pop precision". Pulp praised Dayoung's "charming" vocal delivery in the song.

Commercially, "Body" peaked at number nine on the South Korean music service Melon's Top 100 chart and entered the top 20 on its weekly chart. On September 23, 2025, "Body" won a trophy on The Show, the first in Dayoung's career. As of December 2025, the track's dance challenge had reportedly gone viral, with more than 50,000 participants online.

== Music video ==
The music video for "Body" was shot in Los Angeles. It is composed of one-take clips combined into a single video, showing Dayoung dancing her way through a mansion during a house party. According to the singer, although the video seems simple, "even the smallest gestures" were carefully choreographed, including her eye movements. Chyenne Tatum of Teen Vogue observed that the video focuses on choreography, rather than glamor shots or "fancy" editing. The staff of Filipino music magazine Pulp identified Dayoung's appearance in "Body" as a transformation from her previous "cute" image, making note of the singer's blonde hair, tan, and prominent abs in the video. Tatum lauded the video as "visually refreshing" and "bursting with hot-summer fun".

== Awards and nominations ==
Name of the award ceremony, year presented, category, nominee of the award, and the result of the nomination
Award ceremony	Year	Category	Work	Result	Ref.
MAMA Awards	2025	Best Dance Performance – Female Solo	"Body"	Nominated	
MAMA Awards	2025	Song of the Year	"Body"	Nominated	

== Listicles ==
Name of publisher, year listed, name of listicle, and placement
Publisher	Year	Listicle	Placement	Ref.
Billboard	2025	The 25 Best K-pop Songs of 2025: Staff Picks	6th	
The Hollywood Reporter	2025	The 40 Best K-pop Songs of 2025	7th	
NME	2025	The 25 best K-pop songs of 2025	12th	
PopMatters	2025	The 15 Best K-pop Songs of 2025	15th	
Pulp	2025	Pulp Loves: Our Favorite K-pop Songs of 2025	Placed	
Stardust	2025	The 25 Best K-pop Songs of 2025	Placed	
Teen Vogue	2025	15 Best K-pop Music Videos of 2025: Ateez, Dayoung, Xlov, Hearts2Hearts and More	Placed	

== Personnel ==
Credits are adapted from Apple Music.

- Dayoung – lead vocals, background vocals
- Jack Brady – lyrics, composition
- Jordan Roman – lyrics, composition
- DCF – lyrics, composition
- Deza – lyrics, composition
- Eric Nam – lyrics, composition
- Exy – lyrics
- The Wavys – production, arrangement
