= Overdose (EP) =

- Korean digital version cover

EP by Exo-K and Exo-M
- Released: 7 May 2014
- Recorded: 2014
- Studios: Doobdoob (Seoul); Iconic Sounds (Seoul); SM Blue Cup (Seoul); SM Blue Ocean (Seoul); SM Yellow Tail (Seoul); Sound Pool (Seoul)
- Genres: R&B; hip hop; electronica
- Length: 22:02
- Languages: Korean; Mandarin; English
- Labels: SM; KT
- Producers: Yoo Young-jin; The Underdogs

Exo-K and Exo-M chronology
Miracles in December (2013)	Overdose (2014)	Exology Chapter 1: The Lost Planet (2014)

Singles from Overdose
- 1. "Overdose" Released: 7 May 2014

Overdose is the third EP by South Korean-Chinese boy bands Exo-K and Exo-M. It was released by SM Entertainment and distributed by KT Music on 7 May 2014, in Korean and Chinese versions. It is preceded by their special EP Miracles in December that was released in December 2013.

This is the final release to include members Kris and Luhan before they left the group and filed lawsuits against SM Entertainment requesting contract termination. It is also the final album released by Exo-K and Exo-M.

== Background and release ==
On 9 April 2014, SM announced that Exo had collaborated with the American production team The Underdogs on the titular track "Overdose", set to be featured on the group's EP. SM's in-house songwriter and producer, Kenzie, contributed the Korean lyrics for the urban dance song, which is based on R&B and hip-hop beats. The following day, the song was leaked on YouTube by various publishers, prompting SM to take action to block the videos due to copyright infringement. The label announced that the group would hold a comeback showcase on the 15th and unveiling the single and its music video. On 14 April, SM logged an official complaint with the Seoul Central District Prosecutors' Office regarding the 10 April incident.

The EP was intended to be released on 21 April as mentioned in the showcase, but its release was postponed due to the Sewol Ferry Disaster on 16 April and the group cancelled all media appearances scheduled on that day and on the 18th.

On 5 May, SM announced that the EP would be released on 7 May. The music videos of "Overdose" were released on the next day on YouTube, then followed by the EP on 7 May. It reached 660,000+ preorders before its release, making it the most pre-ordered EP in South Korean history.

On 15 May, Exo-M's leader Kris filed a lawsuit against SM to terminate his contract citing his neglected health and the company's violation of human rights.

The Korean edition also peaked at No. 2 on Billboard's World Albums Chart, and No. 129 on the "Billboard 200", making Exo the highest charting Korean male group act on the Billboard 200 at the time.

== Promotions ==
Prior to EP release, Exo kickstarted their promotions with a showcase at the Jamsil Arena in Seoul on 15 April. From 1 to 9 April, a contest sponsored by Samsung enabled fans to enter and win tickets to attend the showcase. They promoted into their respective subgroups; Exo-K promoted in South Korea while Exo-M promoted in China. On 24 and 25 May, they held their first solo concert entitled Exo from Exoplanet 1 – The Lost Planet. According to several news reports, tickets were reportedly sold out in seconds.

== Awards and nominations ==
Awards for Overdose
Year	Organization	Award	Result	Ref.
2014	Melon Music Awards	Album of the Year	Longlisted	
2014	Mnet Asian Music Awards	Album of the Year	Won	
2014	SBS Awards Festival	Best Album	Won	
2015	Gaon Chart K-Pop Awards	Album of the Year – 2nd Quarter	Won	
2015	Golden Disc Awards	Album Bonsang	Won	
2015	Golden Disc Awards	Album Daesang	Won	
2015	V Chart Awards	Album of the Year – Korea	Won	

== Track listing ==
Credits adapted from Naver.

Korean version (by Exo-K)
No.	Title	Lyrics	Music	Arrangement	Length
1.	"Overdose" (중독; Jungdok; lit. 'Addiction') (sung by: Exo-K)	Kenzie; Jeon Ji-eun; Hwang Seon-jeong; Kim Jeong-mi	Jeon Ji-eun; Hwang Seon-jeong; Kim Jeong-mi; Harvey Mason Jr.; Damon Thomas; Kenzie; Chaz Jackson; Orlando Williamson; Britt Burton; Rodnae "Chikk" Bell	Jeon Ji-eun; Hwang Seon-jeong; Kim Jeong-mi; The Underdogs; Kenzie; Chaz Jackson; Orlando Williamson; Britt Burton; Rodnae "Chikk" Bell	3:26
2.	"Moonlight" (월광; Wolgwang) (sung by Baekhyun & D.O.)	Seo Ji-eum	Harvey Mason Jr.; Damon Thomas; Britt Burton; Rodnae "Chikk" Bell	Harvey Mason Jr.; Damon Thomas; Britt Burton; Rodnae "Chikk" Bell	4:26
3.	"Thunder"	Jeon Gan-di	Will Simms; Hiten Bharadia; Raphaella Mazaheri-Asadi	Phrased Differently	3:13
4.	"Run"	Seo Ji-eum	Ana Diaz; Jarrad Rogers; Natalia Hajjara	Yoo Han-jin	3:37
5.	"Love, Love, Love"	Seo Ji-eum	Deez; Jimmy Burney; Daniel "Obi" Klein	Deez	3:55
6.	"Overdose" (중독; Jungdok; lit. 'Addiction') (Exo version)	Kenzie; Jeon Ji-eun; Hwang Seon-jeong; Kim Jeong-mi	Jeon Ji-eun; Hwang Seon-jeong; Kim Jeong-mi; Harvey Mason Jr.; Damon Thomas; Kenzie; Chaz Jackson; Orlando Williamson; Britt Burton; Rodnae "Chikk" Bell	Jeon Ji-eun; Hwang Seon-jeong; Kim Jeong-mi; The Underdogs; Kenzie; Chaz Jackson; Orlando Williamson; Britt Burton; Rodnae "Chikk" Bell	3:26
Total length:					22:02

Chinese version (by Exo-M)
No.	Title	Lyrics	Music	Arrangement	Length
1.	"上瘾 (Overdose)" (sung by: Exo-M)	黄貞穎 Annakid	Jeon Ji-eun; Hwang Seon-jeong; Kim Jeong-mi; Harvey Mason Jr.; Damon Thomas; Kenzie; Chaz Jackson; Orlando Williamson; Britt Burton; Rodnae "Chikk" Bell	Jeon Ji-eun; Hwang Seon-jeong; Kim Jeong-mi; The Underdogs; Kenzie; Chaz Jackson; Orlando Williamson; Britt Burton; Rodnae "Chikk" Bell	3:26
2.	"月光 (Moonlight)" (sung by Chen & Luhan)	Lin Xinye	Harvey Mason Jr.; Damon Thomas; Britt Burton; Rodnae "Chikk" Bell	Harvey Mason Jr.; Damon Thomas; Britt Burton; Rodnae "Chikk" Bell	4:26
3.	"Thunder (雷电)"	Lin Xinye	Will Simms; Hiten Bharadia; Raphaella Mazaheri-Asadi	Phrased Differently	3:13
4.	"Run (奔跑)"	Zhou Mi	Ana Diaz; Jarrad Rogers; Natalia Hajjara	Yoo Han-jin	3:37
5.	"Love, Love, Love (梦中梦)"	黄貞穎 Annakid	Deez; Jimmy Burney; Daniel "Obi" Klein	Deez	3:55
6.	"上瘾 (Overdose)" (Exo version)	黄貞穎 Annakid	Jeon Ji-eun; Hwang Seon-jeong; Kim Jeong-mi; Harvey Mason Jr.; Damon Thomas; Kenzie; Chaz Jackson; Orlando Williamson; Britt Burton; Rodnae "Chikk" Bell	Jeon Ji-eun; Hwang Seon-jeong; Kim Jeong-mi; The Underdogs; Kenzie; Chaz Jackson; Orlando Williamson; Britt Burton; Rodnae "Chikk" Bell	3:26
Total length:					22:02

== Charts ==
Chart	Peak position	
Chart	Overdose (Exo-K)	Overdose (Exo-M)
South Korea Weekly Albums (Gaon)	1	2
South Korea Monthly Albums (Gaon)	1	2
South Korea Yearly Albums – 2014 (Gaon)	1	2
South Korea Yearly Albums – 2015 (Gaon)	93	—
Japan Weekly Albums (Oricon)	3	5
Japan Monthly Albums (Oricon)	11	19
US Billboard 200	129	—
US World Albums (Billboard)	2	5
US Heatseekers Albums (Billboard)	1	8

== Sales ==
Chart	Sales
Japan (Oricon)	37,000 (Korean version)
Japan (Oricon)	15,000 (Chinese version)
South Korea (Gaon)	413,759 (Korean version)
South Korea (Gaon)	274,207 (Chinese version)

== Release history ==
Release history for Overdose
Region	Date	Format	Label
South Korea	7 May 2014	CD	SM; KT
Various	7 May 2014	Digital download; streaming	SM
