= Dayoung =

South Korean singer (born 1999)

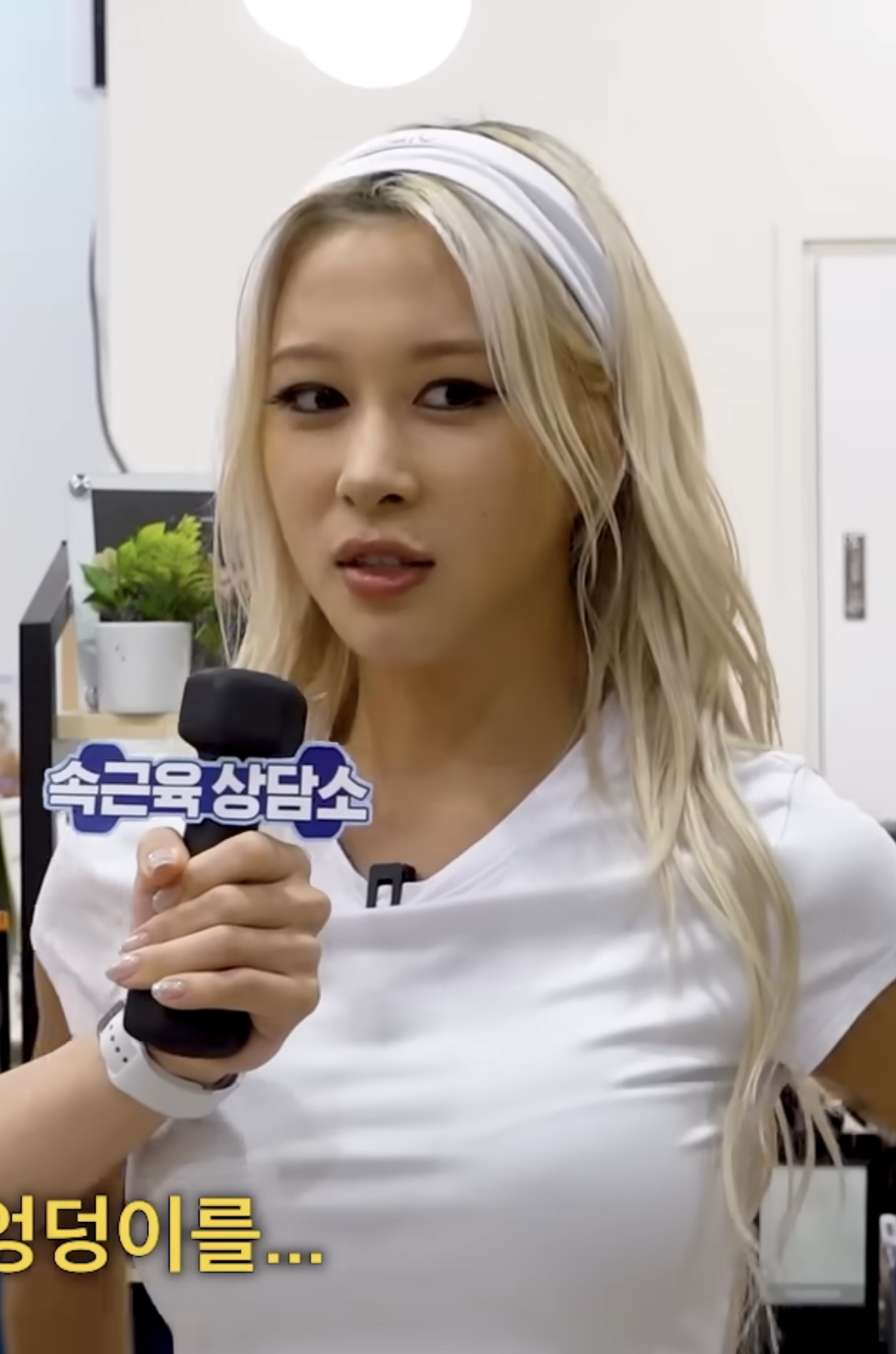
- Dayoung in September 2025
- Born: Im Da-young; May 14, 1999 (age 27); Jeju Province, South Korea
- Education: School of Performing Arts Seoul
- Occupation: Singer
- Musical career
- Genres: K-pop
- Instrument: Vocals
- Years active: 2016–present
- Label: Starship
- Member of: WJSN; WJSN Chocome
- Formerly of: Y-Teen

Korean name
- Hangul: 임다영
- RR: Im Dayeong
- MR: Im Tayŏng

Im Da-young (Korean: 임다영; born May 14, 1999), better known by the mononym Dayoung, is a South Korean singer. She is a member of the South Korean girl group WJSN and its subunit WJSN Chocome. Dayoung made her solo debut in 2025 with the song "Body" from her digital single album Gonna Love Me, Right?.

== Early life ==
Im Da-young was born on May 14, 1999 in Jeju, South Korea. She graduated from the School of Performing Arts Seoul in 2018.

In 2011, at the age of 12, Dayoung performed on reality competition show K-pop Star.

== Career ==
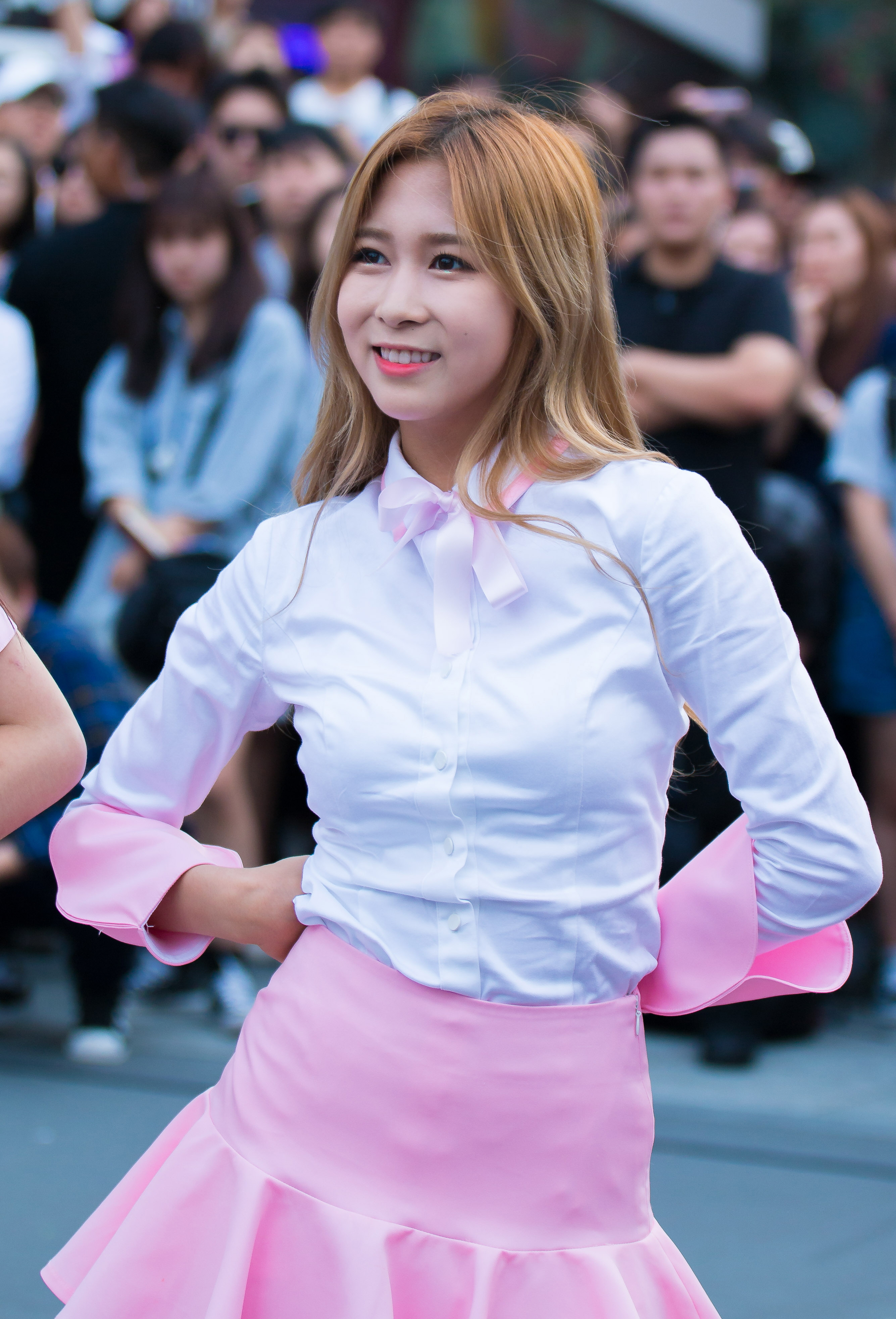
Dayoung performing in 2016

On December 10, 2015, Dayoung was announced as a member of then-upcoming girl group WJSN. She debuted with the group on February 25, 2016. In August 2016, Dayoung, alongside members Exy, Seola, Soobin, Eunseo, Cheng Xiao, and Yeoreum, teamed up with label mate Monsta X to form the unit Y-Teen, a project unit group that promoted as CF models for KT's phone fare service. On October 7, 2020, Dayoung debuted in the group's sub-unit WJSN Chocome alongside members Soobin, Luda, and Yeoreum.

In 2020, Dayoung and fellow WJSN member Exy contributed the song "Oh My, Oh My" to the original soundtrack for Welcome.

In 2024, Dayoung collaborated with Eden for the song "Love Is" for the Doctor Slump original soundtrack. In the same year, she also sang the song "Love Wave" for the South Korean TV series of the same name.

On September 9, 2025, Dayoung released her debut single album Gonna Love Me, Right? with the title track "Body".

On April 7, 2026, Dayoung released her digital single "What's a Girl to Do", along with the music video for the lead song of the same name. On August 4, she released the digital single "Flirty", in collaboration with Jay Park.

== Discography ==
=== Single album ===
Title	Album details
Gonna Love Me, Right?	Released: September 9, 2025; Label: Starship Entertainment; Formats: Digital download, streaming; Track listing: 1. "Body"; 2. "Number One Rockstar"; 3. "Marry Me"

=== Singles ===
Title	Year	Peak chart positions	Album
Title	Year	KOR	Album
"Body"	2025	10	Gonna Love Me, Right?
"What's a Girl to Do"	2026	— (Note: "What's a Girl to Do" did not enter the Circle Digital Chart, but peaked at number 26 on the Circle Download Chart.)	Non-album single
"Flirty" (with Jay Park)	2026	TBA	Non-album single
"—" denotes releases that did not chart or were not released in that region.

=== Soundtrack appearances ===
Title	Year	Peak chart positions	Album
Title	Year	KOR Down.	Album
"Oh My, Oh My" (어마어마) (with Exy)	2020	—	Welcome OST
"Love Is" (사랑한다는 말은) (with Eden)	2024	140	Doctor Slump OST
"Love Wave" (러브 웨이브)	2024	—	Love Wave OST
"—" denotes releases that did not chart or were not released in that region.

=== Other charted songs ===
Title	Year	Peak chart positions	Album
Title	Year	KOR Down.	Album
"Number One Rockstar"	2025	53	Gonna Love Me, Right?
"Priceless (Kaching Kaching)"	2026	106	Non-album single

=== Music videos ===
List of music videos, showing year released, and name of the director(s)
Title	Year	Director	Ref.
"Body"	2025	Young Ji Choi (PinkLabel Visual)	
"Number One Rockstar"	2025	Young Ji Choi (PinkLabel Visual)	
"What's a Girl to Do?"	2026	Young Ji Choi (PinkLabel Visual)	

== Filmography ==
=== Television series ===
Year	Title	Role	Notes	Ref.
2020	Love Revolution	Oh Ah-ram		
2021	True Beauty	Chae-ni	Special appearance	

=== Television shows ===
Year	Title	Role	Ref.
2011	K-pop Star	Contestant	
2020	King of Mask Singer	Contestant	
2022–present	Kick a Goal	Herself / member of FC Top Girl	

=== Radio ===
Year	Title	Role	Ref.
2020–2021	Avengers	Host	

== Awards and nominations ==
Name of the award ceremony, year presented, category, nominee of the award, and the result of the nomination
Award ceremony	Year	Category	Nominee / Work	Result	Ref.
Korea First Brand Awards	2026	Female Solo Singer – Rookie	Dayoung	Won	
Korea Grand Music Awards	2025	Best Solo Artist – Female	Dayoung	Won	
MAMA Awards	2025	Best Dance Performance – Female Solo	"Body"	Nominated	
MAMA Awards	2025	Song of the Year	"Body"	Nominated	
