= Overdose (Exo song) =

2014 single by Exo

Single by Exo

from the EP Overdose
- Language: Korean; Mandarin
- Released: May 7, 2014
- Recorded: 2014
- Studio: SM Yellow Tail (Seoul); SM Blue Cup (Seoul)
- Genre: K-pop; hip hop; R&B
- Length: 3:26
- Label: SM; KT Music
- Composer: The Underdogs
- Lyricist: Kenzie
- Producer: The Underdogs

Exo singles chronology
"Miracles in December" (2013)	"Overdose" (2014)	"December, 2014 (The Winter's Tale)" (2014)

Music videos
- "Overdose" (Korean version) on YouTube
- "Overdose" (Chinese version) on YouTube

"Overdose" (Korean: 중독; RR: Jungdog; Chinese: 上瘾; pinyin: Shàngyǐn) is a song by South Korean–Chinese boy band Exo, released on May 7, 2014, as the lead single of their second EP Overdose. It was released in both Korean and Chinese versions by their label SM Entertainment. It was the final release by members Kris and Luhan following their lawsuits in May and October 2014 respectively, and also the last single performed by Exo-M and Exo-K.

== Background and release ==
Produced by The Underdogs, "Overdose" described as a heavy-hitting, urban-pop banger with hard rhythms of hip-hop, R&B hooks and electronic beats with the lyrics of the feeling of overdosing on a sweet drug as a metaphor to describe a man's intense addiction to love. The song was released on May 7, 2014, together with the EP.

The Korean and Chinese music videos for "Overdose" were released on May 6, 2014. The music video shows the members in a maze-like setting while they perform the choreography. On May 5, 2016, the Korean music video reached 100 million views, and later reached 200 million views on September 23, 2019, becoming their fifth music video to do so. Exo-K began performing the song on South Korean music television programs on April 11, 2014, and Exo-M began performing the song on the Chinese weekly music program, Global Chinese Music on April 19.

== Reception ==
"Overdose" debuted at number two on the Gaon Digital Chart and at number two at the Billboard World Digital Songs chart. The Korean version of the song went on to win first place eight times while the Chinese version won first place two times. The song sold more than 1 million copies in less than a year from its release. PopMatters ranked the song number 15 in their list of the 15 best K-pop songs of 2014.

== Accolades ==
Awards and nominations for "Overdose"
Year	Award	Category	Result
2014	Mnet Asian Music Awards	Song of the Year	Nominated
2014	Mnet Asian Music Awards	Best Dance Performance Male Group	Nominated
2015	Golden Disk Awards	Digital Bonsang	Nominated
2015	Myx Music Awards	Favourite K-Pop Video	Nominated

Music program awards
Program	Date	Ref.
Show Champion	May 14, 2014	
M Countdown	May 15, 2014	
M Countdown	May 22, 2014	
Show! Music Core	May 17, 2014	
Show! Music Core	May 24, 2014	
Inkigayo	May 18, 2014	
Inkigayo	May 25, 2014	
Inkigayo	June 1, 2014	

== Charts ==
=== Weekly charts ===
Chart (2014)	Peak position
South Korea (Gaon)	2
US World Digital Songs (Billboard)	2

=== Monthly charts ===
Chart (2014)	Peak position
South Korea (Gaon)	2

=== Yearly charts ===
Chart (2014)	Position
South Korea (Gaon)	18

== Sales ==
Region	Sales
South Korea (Gaon)	1,168,390
United States (Nielsen)	58,000

== Release history ==
Release history for "Overdose"
Region	Date	Format	Label
Various	May 7, 2014	Digital download; streaming	SM; KT Music
