= List of songs written by Hyuna =

This is a list of songs written or co-written by Hyuna, a South Korean singer-songwriter. All song credits are adapted from the Korea Music Copyright Association's database, unless otherwise noted.

== Songwriting and Composing credits ==
Year	Album	Artist	Song	Lyrics		Music	
Year	Album	Artist	Song	Credited	With	Credited	With
2012	Melting	Hyuna	"To My Boyfriend" (내 남자친구에게)	Yes	Son Young-jin, Im Sang-hyuk	Yes	Son Yong-jin, Im San-hyuk
2012	Melting	Hyuna	"Very Hot"	Yes	Kim Lee-won	Yes	Kim Lee-won, Shinsadong Tiger
2013	Non-album singles	Hyuna	"My Color"	Yes	—	Yes	—
2013	Chemistry	Trouble Maker	"Player" (놀고 싶은 Girl; Nolgo Sipeun Girl) (Hyunseung feat. Hyuna))	Yes	Jeon Seung-woo	No	—
2014	4Minute World	4Minute	"Thank You :)" (고마워; Gomawo)	Yes	Kwon So-hyun, Seo Jae-woo	No	—
2014	A Talk	Hyuna	"A Talk"	Yes	Seo Jae-woo, Astroz	No	—
2014	A Talk	Hyuna	"From When and Until When" (with Yang Yoseob) (어디부터 어디까지; Eodibuteo Eodikkaji)	Yes	Im Hyun-sik	No	—
2014	A Talk	Hyuna	"Blacklist" (feat. LE)	Yes	LE	No	—
2015	Crazy	4Minute	"Crazy" (미쳐; Michyo)	Yes	Seo Jae-woo, Big Ssancho, Son Young-jin	No	—
2015	Crazy	4Minute	"Show Me"	Yes	Big Ssancho, rap by Kim Hyun-a, Kwon So-hyun	No	—
2015	A+	Hyuna	"Run & Run"	Yes	Seo Jaewoo, Big Sancho	No	—
2015	A+	Hyuna	"Ice Ice" (feat. Yuk Jidam)	Yes	Big Sancho, Yuk Jidam	No	—
2015	A+	Hyuna	"Serene"	Yes	Seo Jaewoo, Son Youngjin	No	—
2016	Act. 7	4Minute	"Hate" (싫어; Silheo))	Yes	Seo Jae-woo, Son Young-jin, Jenyer	No	—
2016	Act. 7	4Minute	"No Love"	Yes	Ra-young, Gen Neo (of NoizeBank), Jenyer	No	—
2016	Act. 7	4Minute	"Blind""	Yes	Kwon So-hyun, Jenyer,	No	—
2016	A'wesome	Hyuna	"U & Me♡"	Yes	Seo Jaewoo, Son Youngjin	No	—
2016	A'wesome	Hyuna	"How's This?" (어때?)	Yes	Seo Jaewoo, Big Sancho	No	—
2016	A'wesome	Hyuna	"Do it!"	Yes	Seo Jaewoo, Big Sancho, Brian Lee	No	—
2016	A'wesome	Hyuna	"Freaky" (꼬리쳐)	Yes	Big Sancho	No	—
2016	A'wesome	Hyuna	"Wolf" (featuring Hanhae of Phantom)	Yes	Hanhae	No	—
2017	Crystyle	CLC	"Hobgoblin" (도깨비)	Yes	Seo Jaewoo, Big Sancho, Son Youngjin	No	—
2017	199X	Triple H	"Sunflower" (바라기)"	Yes	Hui, E'Dawn, Kang Dongha	No	—
2017	199X	Triple H	"3 6 5 Fresh"	Yes	Seo Jaewoo, Kang Dongha, Devine Channel, E'Dawn	No	—
2017	199X	Triple H	"What's Going On?" (꿈이야 생시야)"	Yes	Big Sancho, Son Young-jin, E'Dawn	No	—
2017	199X	Triple H	"Girl Girl Girl"	Yes	Wonderkid, Shinkung, BreadBeat, E'Dawn	No	—
2017	Following	Hyuna	"Party (Follow Me)"	Yes	Big Sancho, Wooseok	Yes	Big Sancho
2017	Following	Hyuna	"Babe"	Yes	Shinsadong, TigerBeom	No	—
2017	Following	Hyuna	"Purple"	Yes	E'Dawn	No	—
2017	Following	Hyuna	"Dart"	Yes	Son Young-jin, Kang Dongha	No	—
2017	Following	Hyuna	"Self-portrait"	Yes	January 8	No	—
2017	Lip & Hip	Hyuna	"Lip & Hip"	Yes	Big Sancho, Son Young-jin, Scott	No	—
2018	Retro Futurism	Triple H	"Feeling" (느낌)	Yes	JayJay (MosPick), E'Dawn	No	—
2018	Retro Futurism	Triple H	"Retro Future"	Yes	E'Dawn, Lim Kwang-wook, Yummy Tone	Yes	Lim Kwang-wook, Yummy Tone, E'Dawn
2019	I'm Not Cool	Hyuna	"Flower Shower"	Yes	Psy	No	—
2021	I'm Not Cool	Hyuna	"I'm Not Cool"	Yes	Psy, Dawn	No	—
2021	I'm Not Cool	Hyuna	"Good Girl"	Yes	—	No	—
2021	1+1=1	Hyuna & Dawn	"Ping Pong"	Yes	Dawn	No	Dawn, Yoo Geon-hyeong, Philip Kwon, Space One
2021	1+1=1	Hyuna & Dawn	"XOXO"	Yes	Philip Kwon, Dawn	Yes	Philip Kwon
2021	1+1=1	Hyuna & Dawn	"I Know" (우린 분명 죽을 만큼 사랑했다)	Yes	Dawn	No	—
2022	Nabillera	Hyuna	"Nabillera" (나빌레라)	Yes	Psy, Dawn	No	—
2022	Nabillera	Hyuna	"Picasso & Fernande Olivier"	Yes	—	Yes	Philip Kwon
2022	Nabillera	Hyuna	"Watch Me"	Yes	—	Yes	Philip Kwon
2022	Show Me the Money 11 Semi Final	Jambino featuring Hyuna and Loco	"Like Water"	Yes	Jambino, Loco, Jay Park	No	—
2024	Attitude	Hyuna	"Attitude"	Yes	Kwaca, Evan	Yes	GroovyRoom, Kwaca, Evan
2024	Attitude	Hyuna	"Q&A"	Yes	HyunaBang, Hye-hyunNa, Jung-ah (153/Joombas), Kwaca, GroovyRoom	Yes	Greg Bonnick & Hayden Chapman, GroovyRoom, Peter Renshaw, Shorelle, Young Chance
2024	Attitude	Hyuna	"Ah!" (featuring Gemini)"	Yes	Jxxdxn, Gemini	Yes	Boycold، Giriboy, Jinbo the Superfreak, Junny, GroovyRoom, Gemini
2024	Attitude	Hyuna	"RSVP" (featuring Changmo)	Yes	GroovyRoom, Kwaca, Evan, Changmo	Yes	GroovyRoom, J.Y. Park "The Asiansoul", Changmo, Isha
