= List of awards and nominations received by Hyuna =

Hyuna awards and nominations
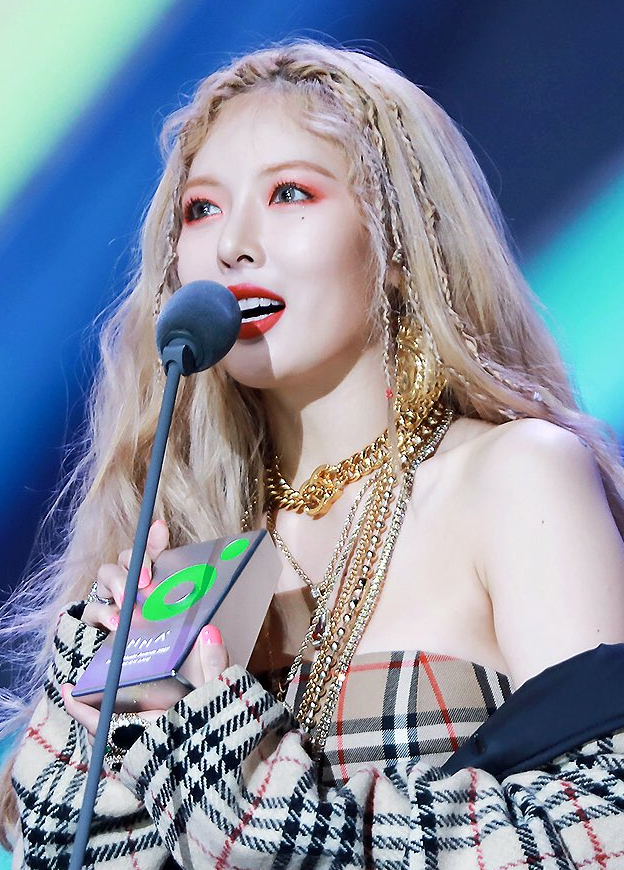
- Hyuna in December 2017
Awards and nominations
Award	Wins	Nominations
Asia Artist Awards	0	1
Asian Pop Music Awards	10	18
Brand Customer Loyalty Awards	0	1
COSMO Glam Night	1	1
Genie Music Awards	2	5
European K-POP / J-POP Music Award	1	1
Golden Disc Awards	2	3
Gaon Chart Music Awards	1	3
Hanteo Music Awards	0	1
Herald Donga TV Lifestyle Awards	1	1
KBS World Radio Awards	0	1
Korea First Brand Awards	0	1
Mnet Asian Music Awards	3	23
Melon Music Awards	2	3
Mnet 20's Choice Awards	1	1
SBS MTV Best of the Best	0	6
Seoul Music Awards	2	4
YinYueTai V Chart Awards	1	1
YouTube K-pop Awards	1	1
Weibo Starlight Awards	1	1
World Music Awards	0	3

Totals (Note: Certain award groups do not simply award one winner. They acknowledge several different recipients, have runners-up, and have third place. Since this is a specific recognition and is different from losing an award, runner-up mentions are considered wins in this award tally. For simplification and to avoid errors, each award in this list has been presumed to have had a prior nomination.)
- Wins: 29
- Nominations: 80

This is a list of awards and nominations received by South Korean singer-songwriter, rapper and model Kim Hyun-ah, known mononymously as Hyuna.

She debuted as a member of the girl group Wonder Girls in February 2007. After leaving the ensemble shortly after, Hyuna subsequently left JYP Entertainment and joined the girl group 4Minute, under Cube Entertainment. 4Minute debuted in June 2009 and went on to become one of the most popular girl groups in the country. In 2010, Hyuna began a solo career with a style she described as "performance-oriented music". Her debut single "Change" charted at number-two on South Korea's Gaon Digital Chart.

In 2011, Hyuna gained wider public recognition with the release of her first extended play Bubble Pop!. The title track sold more than three million digital copies and she became the first female K-pop solo artist to reach 100 million views on a single music video on YouTube. Later the same year, she formed the duo Trouble Maker with former Beast member Hyunseung, releasing the hit single "Trouble Maker". In 2012, she appeared in a successful duet rendition of Psy's worldwide hit "Gangnam Style" and later released her second extended play Melting, which featured the number-one single "Ice Cream". Her next two extended plays A Talk and A+ yielded the successful singles "Red" and "Roll Deep", respectively. Following 4Minute's disbandment in mid-2016, she released her fifth extended play A'wesome, which was supported by her first concert tour The Queen's Back. In 2017, she was involved in the trio Triple H with Pentagon members Hui and E'Dawn before releasing her sixth extended play Following and her first single album Lip & Hip.

In 2018, Hyuna ended her contract with Cube Entertainment after several internal conflicts, and signed with Psy's P Nation the following year. Her first digital single under P Nation Flower Shower became her seventh top-ten entry on the US Billboard World Digital Song Sales. In 2021, Hyuna released her seventh extended play I'm Not Cool. In September, Hyuna and Dawn collaborated to release their duet extended play 1+1=1. In 2022, Hyuna released her eighth extended play Nabillera which is her last solo released under P Nation following her departure from the company in August 2022.

== Awards and nominations ==
Name of the award ceremony, year presented, category, nominee of the award, and the result of the nomination
Award ceremony	Year	Category	Nominee(s) / work(s)	Result	Ref.
Asia Artist Awards	2021	Female Solo Singer Popularity Award	Hyuna	Nominated	
Asian Pop Music Awards (Note: Hosted by the Hong Kong Asia Pacific International Group and Sunway Records, the Asian Pop Music Awards bases its winners on the "Asian Pop Music Chart" which opened in September 2019.)	2020	Outstanding Singers of the Year	Hyuna	Won	
Asian Pop Music Awards	2021	People's Choice Award (Overseas)	"I'm Not Cool"	Won	
Asian Pop Music Awards	2021	People's Choice Award (Overseas)	"Ping Pong" (with Dawn)	Won	
Asian Pop Music Awards	2021	Top 20 Albums of the Year (Overseas)	I'm Not Cool	Won	
Asian Pop Music Awards	2021	Top 20 Songs of the Year (Overseas)	"I'm Not Cool"	Won	
Asian Pop Music Awards	2021	Top 20 Songs of the Year (Overseas)	"Ping Pong" (with Dawn)	Won	
Asian Pop Music Awards	2021	Best Collaboration (Overseas)	"Ping Pong" (with Dawn)	Won	
Asian Pop Music Awards	2021	Album of the Year (Overseas)	I'm Not Cool	Nominated	
Asian Pop Music Awards	2021	Song of the Year (Overseas)	"I'm Not Cool"	Nominated	
Asian Pop Music Awards	2021	Best Dance Performance (Overseas)	"I'm Not Cool"	Nominated	
Asian Pop Music Awards	2021	Best Female Artist	I'm Not Cool	Nominated	
Asian Pop Music Awards	2022	People's Choice Award (Overseas)	"Nabillera"	Won	
Asian Pop Music Awards	2022	Top 20 Albums of the Year (Overseas)	Nabillera	Won	
Asian Pop Music Awards	2022	Top 20 Songs of the Year (Overseas)	"Nabillera"	Won	
Asian Pop Music Awards	2022	Album of the Year (Overseas)	Nabillera	Nominated	
Asian Pop Music Awards	2022	Song of the Year (Overseas)	"Nabillera"	Nominated	
Asian Pop Music Awards	2022	Best Dance Performance (Overseas)	"Nabillera"	Nominated	
Asian Pop Music Awards	2022	Best Female Artist	Nabillera	Nominated	
Brand Customer Loyalty Awards	2021	Best Female Solo Artist	Hyuna	Nominated	
COSMO Glam Night	2019	COSMO Camera Award	Hyuna	Won	
European K-POP / J-POP Music Award	2015	Best TV Stage Performance	"Now" (with Hyunseung)	Won	
Golden Disc Awards	2012	Best Dance Performance	"Trouble Maker" (with Hyunseung)	Won	
Golden Disc Awards	2014	Digital Bonsang	"Red"	Won	
Golden Disc Awards	2022	Digital Song Bonsang	"I'm Not Cool"	Nominated	
Golden Disc Awards	2022	Seezn Most Popular Artist Award	Hyuna	Nominated	
Gaon Chart Music Awards	2010	Streaming Award	"Change"	Won	
Gaon Chart Music Awards	2022	Song of the Year – January	"I'm Not Cool"	Nominated	
Gaon Chart Music Awards	2022	Mubeat Global Choice Award – Female	Hyuna	Nominated	
Hanteo Music Awards	2021	Artist Award – Female Solo	Hyuna	Nominated	
Herald Donga TV Lifestyle Awards	2012	Hot Icon Award	Hyuna	Won	
KBS World Radio Awards	2021	Solo Artist of The Year	Hyuna	Nominated	
Korea First Brand Awards (Note: Hosted by the Korea Consumer Brand Committee and the Korea Consumer Forum, the Korea First Brand Awards bases its winners on a nationwide South Korean survey.)	2022	Female Solo Singer	Hyuna	Nominated	
Mnet Asian Music Awards	2010	Best Dance Performance – Solo	"Change"	Nominated	
Mnet Asian Music Awards	2011	Best Dance Performance – Solo	"Bubble Pop!"	Won	
Mnet Asian Music Awards	2012	Best Dance Performance – Solo	"Ice Cream"	Nominated	
Mnet Asian Music Awards	2012	Best Collaboration	"Trouble Maker" (with Hyunseung)	Won	
Mnet Asian Music Awards	2012	Song of the Year	"Ice Cream"	Nominated	
Mnet Asian Music Awards	2014	Song of the Year	"Red"	Nominated	
Mnet Asian Music Awards	2014	Best Dance Performance – Solo	"Red"	Nominated	
Mnet Asian Music Awards	2014	Artist of the Year	Hyuna	Nominated	
Mnet Asian Music Awards	2014	Best Female Artist	Hyuna	Nominated	
Mnet Asian Music Awards	2015	UnionPay Artist of the Year	Hyuna	Nominated	
Mnet Asian Music Awards	2015	Best Female Artist	Hyuna	Nominated	
Mnet Asian Music Awards	2015	UnionPay Song of the Year	"Roll Deep"	Nominated	
Mnet Asian Music Awards	2015	Best Dance Performance – Solo	"Roll Deep"	Won	
Mnet Asian Music Awards	2016	Best Dance Performance – Solo	"How's This?"	Nominated	
Mnet Asian Music Awards	2016	UnionPay Song of the Year	"How's This?"	Nominated	
Mnet Asian Music Awards	2016	UnionPay Artist of the Year	Hyuna	Nominated	
Mnet Asian Music Awards	2017	Song of the Year	"Babe"	Nominated	
Mnet Asian Music Awards	2017	Best Dance Performance – Solo	"Babe"	Nominated	
Mnet Asian Music Awards	2018	Best Dance Performance – Solo	"Lip & Hip"	Nominated	
Mnet Asian Music Awards	2021	Song of the year	"I'm Not Cool	Nominated	
Mnet Asian Music Awards	2021	Best Dance Performance – Solo	"I'm Not Cool	Nominated	
Mnet Asian Music Awards	2021	TikTok Favorite Moment	Hyuna	Nominated	
Mnet Asian Music Awards	2021	Worldwide Fans' Choice Top 10	Hyuna	Shortlisted	
Melon Music Awards	2012	Global Star Award	Hyuna	Nominated	
Melon Music Awards	2012	Hot Trend Song	"Trouble Maker" (with Hyunseung)	Won	
Melon Music Awards	2017	MBC Music Star Award	Hyuna	Won	
Mnet 20's Choice Awards	2012	20's Performance	Hyuna	Won	
SBS MTV Best of the Best	2012	Best Global	Hyuna	Nominated	
SBS MTV Best of the Best	2012	Best Solo Female	Hyuna	Nominated	
SBS MTV Best of the Best	2012	Best Cameo	"Gangnam Style"	Nominated	
SBS MTV Best of the Best	2012	Best Collaboration with PSY	"Oppa Is Just My Style"	Nominated	
SBS MTV Best of the Best	2014	Best Solo Female	Hyuna	Nominated	
SBS MTV Best of the Best	2014	Best Sexy Video	"Red"	Nominated	
Seoul Music Awards	2013	Bonsang Award	"Ice Cream"	Nominated	
Seoul Music Awards	2013	Popularity Award	"Ice Cream"	Nominated	
Seoul Music Awards	2015	Dance Performance Award	"Red"	Won	
Seoul Music Awards	2022	R&B Hip Hop Award	"I'm Not Cool"	Won	
YinYueTai V-Chart Awards	2013	Best Korean Female Artist	Hyuna	Won	
YouTube K-pop Awards	2011	Popularity Video Award	"Bubble Pop!"	Won	
Weibo Starlight Awards	2021	Starlight Hall of Fame (Korea)	Hyuna	Won	
World Music Awards	2014	World's Best Female Artist	Hyuna	Nominated	
World Music Awards	2014	World's Best Live Act	Hyuna	Nominated	
World Music Awards	2014	World's Best Entertainer of the Year	Hyuna	Nominated	

== Other accolades ==
=== Listicles ===
Name of publisher, year listed, name of listicle, and placement
Publisher	Year	Listicle	Placement	Ref.
Billboard	2011	21 Under 21	17th	
