= Money (Dawn song) =

2019 debut single by Dawn

Single by Dawn
- Language: Korean
- Released: November 5, 2019
- Recorded: 2019
- Genre: K-pop
- Length: 3:23
- Label: P Nation; Dreamus
- Songwriter(s): Psy; Dawn
- Producer(s): Psy; Dawn; Kwon Phillip; Yu Geon-hyeong; Kang Pil-seong

Dawn singles chronology
| "Money" (2019) | "Dawndididawn" (2020) |

Music video
- "Money" on YouTube

"Money" (stylized in all caps) is the debut solo single by South Korean singer and rapper Dawn, released on November 5, 2019, by P Nation. The music video was released on the same day. "Money" marks Dawn's first release with P Nation and his first release after his departure from the boy group Pentagon and his former agency Cube Entertainment.

== Background and release ==
The song was written and produced by Psy and Dawn. The song was released the same day as Hyuna's "Flower Shower", with both singles promoted as the couple's first songs released since their departure from Cube Entertainment and their first work released under P Nation.

The music video teaser was released on November 1. The official music video was released on November 5. The dance practice was released on November 8.

Dawn promoted the song on several music programs in South Korea including M Countdown, Show! Music Core and Inkigayo.

== Reception ==
"Money" debuted at number 11 on the Billboard World Digital Song Sales.

== Credits and personnel ==
- Dawn – vocals, songwriting, producer
- Psy – songwriting, producer
- Kwon Phillip – producer
- Yu Geon-hyeong – producer
- Kang Pil-seong – producer

== Charts ==
=== Weekly charts ===
| Chart (2019) | Peak position |
|---|---|
| US World Digital Songs (Billboard) | 11 |

== Release history ==
| Region | Date | Format | Label |
|---|---|---|---|
| Various | November 5, 2019 | Digital download; streaming | P Nation; Dreamus |
