= Navillera =

Navillera may refer to:

- "Navillera" (song), a 2016 song by GFriend
- Navillera (TV series), a 2021 South Korean TV series

== See also ==
- Nabillera, a 2022 EP by Hyuna
  - "Nabillera" (song), the title song
