= List of awards and nominations received by Pentagon =

Pentagon awards and nominations
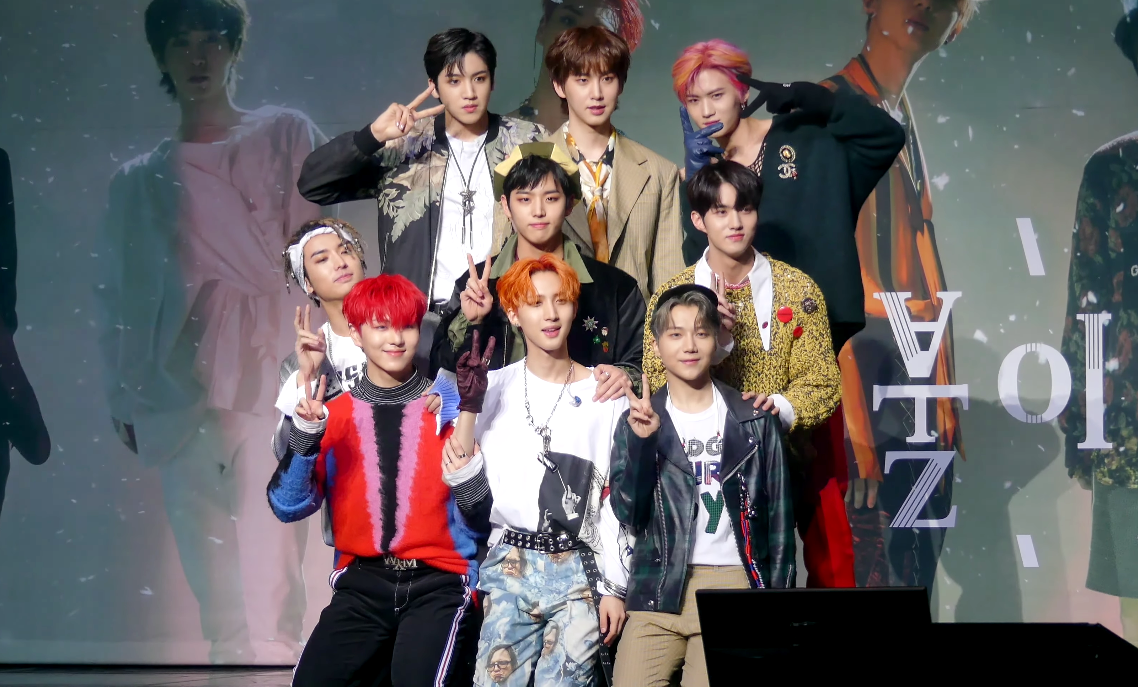
- Pentagon at the Genie:us album showcase on March 27, 2019
Awards and nominations
Award	Wins	Nominations
Asia Artist Awards	1	3
Brand Customer Loyalty Award	0	1
Gaon Chart Music Awards	0	1
Genie Music Awards	1	6
Golden Disc Awards	0	5
Korea Popular Music Awards	1	5
Mnet Asian Music Awards	0	4
MTV Europe Music Awards	0	1
Seoul Music Awards	0	13
Soribada Best K-Music Awards	1	3
Other awards	5	6

Totals (Note: Certain award groups do not simply award one winner. They acknowledge several different recipients, have runners-up, and have third place. Since this is a specific recognition and is different from losing an award, runner-up mentions are considered wins in this award tally. For simplification and to avoid errors, each award in this list has been presumed to have had a prior nomination.)
- Wins: 13
- Nominations: 60

This is a list of awards and nominations received by Pentagon, a South Korean boy band formed by Cube Entertainment, since their debut in 2016.

== Awards and nominations ==
Name of the award ceremony, year presented, award category, nominee(s) and result of the nomination
Award ceremony	Year	Category	Nominee / work	Result	Ref.
APAN Music Awards	2020	Top 10 (Bonsang)	Pentagon	Nominated	
APAN Music Awards	2020	Popularity Award Male Group	Pentagon	Nominated	
Asia Artist Awards	2016	Most Popular Artists (Singer)	Pentagon	Nominated	
Asia Artist Awards	2017	Most Popular Artists (Singer)	Pentagon	Nominated	
Asia Artist Awards	2020	Best Icon Award	Pentagon	Won	
Asia Artist Awards	2021	Male Idol Group Popularity Award	Pentagon	Nominated	
Asia Artist Awards	2021	Best Choice Singer Award	Pentagon	Won	
Asia Artist Awards	2022	Best Choice Singer Award	Pentagon	Won	
Asia Model Awards	2017	New Star Award (Singer)	Pentagon	Won	
Asia Model Awards	2019	Popular Star Award (Singer)	Pentagon	Won	
Brand Customer Loyalty Award	2021	Hot Trend Male Idol Group	Pentagon	Nominated	
Brand of the Year Awards	2018	New Male Idol of the Year	Pentagon	Nominated	
Brand of the Year Awards	2020	Male Idol of the Year (Rising Star)	Pentagon	Nominated	
Brand of the Year Awards	2022	Male Idol of the Year	Pentagon	Nominated	
Gaon Chart Music Awards	2017	Rookie of the Year	Pentagon	Nominated	
Genie Music Awards	2018	Artist of the Year	Pentagon	Nominated	
Genie Music Awards	2018	Discovery of the Year	Pentagon	Nominated	
Genie Music Awards	2018	Genie Music Popularity Award	Pentagon	Nominated	
Genie Music Awards	2018	Song of the Year	"Shine"	Nominated	
Genie Music Awards	2018	Dance Track (Male)	"Shine"	Nominated	
Genie Music Awards	2019	MBC Plus Star Award / M2 Hot Star	Pentagon	Won	
Golden Disc Awards	2017	Rookie of the Year Award	Pentagon	Nominated	
Golden Disc Awards	2017	Popularity Award	Pentagon	Nominated	
Golden Disc Awards	2019	Disc Bonsang	Positive	Nominated	
Golden Disc Awards	2022	Album Bonsang	Love or Take	Nominated	
Golden Disc Awards	2022	Seenz Most Popular Artist Award	Pentagon	Nominated	
Hanteo Music Awards	2026	10th Anniversary Influential Artist	Pentagon	Won	
Hanteo Music Awards	2026	Best Artist Pick	Pentagon	Nominated	
K Global Heart Dream Awards	2022	K Global Hot Star Award	Pentagon	Won	
Korea Culture Entertainment Awards	2018	K-Pop Singer Award	Pentagon	Won	
Korea Music Festival Special Awards	2017	Rising Star Award	Pentagon	Won	
Korea Sharing Volunteer Awards	2019	Korea Volunteering Grand Award	Pentagon	Won	
Korea Popular Music Awards (Note: The awards ceremony is organized by the Korea Singers Association, the Korea Entertainment Producer's Association, the Recording Industry Association of Korea, the Federation of Korean Music Performers, and the Korea Music Copyright Association.)	2018	Best Artist	Pentagon	Nominated	
Korea Popular Music Awards	2018	Best Digital Song	"Shine"	Nominated	
Korea Popular Music Awards	2018	Best Group Dance Track	"Shine"	Nominated	
Korea Popular Music Awards	2018	Popularity Award	Pentagon	Nominated	
Korea Popular Music Awards	2018	Public Singing Performance Award	Pentagon	Won	
Mnet Asian Music Awards	2016	Best New Male Artist	Pentagon	Nominated	
Mnet Asian Music Awards	2016	Hotels Combined Artist of the Year	Pentagon	Nominated	
Mnet Asian Music Awards	2018	Song of the Year	"Shine"	Nominated	
Mnet Asian Music Awards	2018	Best Dance Performance – Male Group	"Shine"	Nominated	
MTV Europe Music Awards	2018	Best Korean Act	Pentagon	Nominated	
Seoul International Drama Awards	2021	Outstanding Korean Drama OST	"Twenty-Twenty"	Nominated	
Seoul Music Awards	2017	New Artist Award	Pentagon	Nominated	
Seoul Music Awards	2017	Bonsang Award	Pentagon	Nominated	
Seoul Music Awards	2017	Popularity Award	Pentagon	Nominated	
Seoul Music Awards	2017	Hallyu Special Award	Pentagon	Nominated	
Seoul Music Awards	2018	Main Award	Pentagon	Nominated	
Seoul Music Awards	2018	Popularity Award	Pentagon	Nominated	
Seoul Music Awards	2018	Hallyu Special Award	Pentagon	Nominated	
Seoul Music Awards	2019	Popularity Award	Pentagon	Nominated	
Seoul Music Awards	2019	Hallyu Special Award	Pentagon	Nominated	
Seoul Music Awards	2020	Main Award	Pentagon	Nominated	
Seoul Music Awards	2020	Popularity Award	Pentagon	Nominated	
Seoul Music Awards	2020	Hallyu Special Award	Pentagon	Nominated	
Seoul Music Awards	2020	Fan PD Artist Award	Pentagon	Nominated	
Soribada Best K-Music Awards	2017	New Artist of the Year	Pentagon	Won	
Soribada Best K-Music Awards	2019	Bonsang Award	Pentagon	Nominated	
Soribada Best K-Music Awards	2019	Male Popularity Award	Pentagon	Nominated	
Soribada Best K-Music Awards	2020	Bonsang Award	Pentagon	Nominated	
Soribada Best K-Music Awards	2020	Male Popularity Award	Pentagon	Nominated	
