= Dawndididawn (song) =

2020 single by Dawn

Single by Dawn featuring Jessi

from the album Dawndididawn
- Language: Korean; English
- Released: October 9, 2020
- Genre: K-pop, hip-hop
- Length: 3:12
- Label: P Nation
- Songwriters: Psy; Dawn; Jessi; D.Ark
- Producers: Psy; Yoo Geon-hyeong; Penomeco

Dawn featuring Jessi singles chronology
"Money" (2019)	"Dawndididawn" (2020)	"Ping Pong" (2021)

Music video
- "Dawndididawn" on YouTube

"Dawndididawn" (Korean: 던디리던; RR: deondilideon) is a song recorded by South Korean singer and rapper Dawn. It was released on October 9, 2020, through P Nation, in conjunction with his debut EP by the same name. Its accompanying music video was uploaded to Dawn's official YouTube channel on the same day.

== Background and release ==
On September 24, 2020, Dawn announced via Instagram that he would be returning in October with new music. On the following day, P Nation shared a video teaser, announcing a mini-album titled "Dawndididawn" and lead single of the same name, with a yet-to-be-announced featured artist, both to be released on October 9 at 6 p.m. KST. Later that same day, labelmate Jessi was revealed to be the featured artist through a photo teaser. On September 25, the EP's tracklist was revealed.

On October 1, the first music video teaser was made available. Further teasers were released daily up until the release of the single.

The song was released via digital download and streaming on October 8, 2020, in conjunction with Dawn's debut EP of the same name. It marked Dawn's first comeback in 11 months, since the standalone single "Money" in 2019.

== Composition ==
The song is a hip-hop track composed by Psy, Yoo Geon-hyeong, and Penomeco, and written by Psy, Dawn, Jessi and D.Ark. The lyrics are filled with references to people in Dawn's life, including labelmate and partner Hyuna and his label P Nation's CEO Psy. The track has been described as "a minimal hip-hop song with 808 sounds, and addictive whistling riffs and drum beats", and with containing "candid and unstoppable lyrics and Dawn's unique kitsch atmosphere".

== Promotion ==
An online showcase was held on the day of the song's release on October 8.

Dawn premiered the song on television through KBS's Music Bank on October 9. On the following day, Dawn performed the song on MBC's Show! Music Core. On October 11, Dawn performed the song on SBS's Inkigayo.

He also appeared on two online radio shows by Naver NOW., Party B and Heize's Diary, the latter hosted by Dawn's labelmate Heize.

A dance practice video for the song's choreography was made available on October 12.

== Reception ==
"Dawndididawn" debuted at number 13 on the Billboard World Digital Song Sales.

Rolling Stone India called the song "saucy" and described the instrumental as "a whistle-tone refrain through the track [that] acts as the base rather than any percussion or synth".

== Music video ==
The music video of "Dawndididawn" was uploaded to Dawn's official YouTube channel on October 9 in conjunction with the release of the single. The song was banned from broadcast by KBS due to "inappropriate lyrics".

== Credits and personnel ==
Credits adapted from Bugs! and Melon.

- Dawn – vocals, songwriting, composing, chorus
- Psy – songwriting, composing, producer
- Jessi – vocals, songwriting
- D.Ark – songwriting
- Yoo Geon-hyeong – producer
- Penomeco – producer

The song was mixed by Stay Tuned at Stay Tuned Studio and mastered by Kwon Nam-woo at 821 Sound Mastering.

== Charts ==
=== Weekly charts ===
Chart (2020)	Peak position
US World Digital Songs (Billboard)	13

== Release history ==
Region	Date	Format	Label
Various	October 9, 2020	Digital download; streaming	P Nation
