= I'm Not Cool =

EP by Hyuna
- Released: January 28, 2021
- Recorded: 2018–2020
- Length: 15:47
- Languages: Korean; English
- Labels: P Nation; Kakao M
- Producer: Park Jae-sang (exec.)

Hyuna chronology
Lip & Hip (2017)	I'm Not Cool (2021)	1+1=1 (2021)

Singles from I'm Not Cool
- 1. "Flower Shower" Released: November 5, 2019; 2. "I'm Not Cool" Released: January 28, 2021

I'm Not Cool is the seventh extended play (EP) by South Korean singer-songwriter Hyuna. It was released on January 28, 2021, by P Nation and distributed by Kakao M. It is Hyuna's first Korean EP in nearly four years, following the release of Following (2017). The EP consists five tracks, including the title track of the same name and her previous digital single "Flower Shower".

== Background ==
After Hyuna's comeback for August 2020 with Good Girl was postponed due to health issues, in January 2021, P Nation announced their first artist comeback of 2021 would be Hyuna's first EP for the label, and seventh EP overall, I'm Not Cool with the title track of same name. The EP includes Hyuna's first single after signing with P Nation, "Flower Shower".

== Release ==
The EP was released on January 28 through many Korean online music services, including Melon. For the global market, the album was made available on iTunes. It was also released in physical format. On her personal Instagram account, the singer revealed that the music video for the single "Good Girl" will be released on February 3, 2021.

== Music video ==
On January 26, a first teaser for the music video of "I'm Not Cool" was released. On the next day, the second teaser for the music video was released. On January 28, the official music video of "I'm Not Cool" was released.

== Promotion ==
Hyuna held the first comeback stage for the EP during Mnet's M Countdown on January 28, where she performed the title track. On January 29, Hyuna performed the title track on KBS's Music Bank and You Hee-yeol's Sketchbook. On January 30, Hyuna performed the title track on MBC's Show! Music Core. On January 31, Hyuna performed the title track on SBS's Inkigayo. She also performed the song Good Girl in music shows.

== Accolades ==
Award and nominations for "I'm Not Cool"
Year	Organization	Award	Result	Ref.
2021	Asian Pop Music Awards	Album of the Year (Overseas)	Nominated	
2021	Asian Pop Music Awards	Top 20 Albums of the Year (Overseas)	Won	
2021	Asian Pop Music Awards	Best Female Artist	Nominated	

== Track listing ==
I'm Not Cool track listing
No.	Title	Lyrics	Music	Arrangement	Length
1.	"I'm Not Cool"	Psy; Hyuna; Dawn	Yoo Geon-hyeong; Space One	Yoo Geon-hyeong; Space One; Slyme Young	2:54
2.	"Good Girl"	Hyuna	Caesar & Loui; Maya Keuc	Caesar & Loui	3:05
3.	"Show Window"	Yummy Tone	Yummy Tone	Yummy Tone	3:10
4.	"Party, Feel, Love" (featuring Dawn)	Yorkie; Dawn	Devine Channel; Tyb; Dawn	Devine Channel	3:30
5.	"Flower Shower"	Psy; Hyuna	Psy; Yoo Geon-hyeong; Space One; Anna Timgren	Space One	3:08
Total length:					15:47

== Charts ==
Weekly chart performance for I'm Not Cool
Chart (2021)	Peak position
South Korean Albums (Gaon)	17

== Release history ==
Release dates and formats for I'm Not Cool
Region	Date	Format	Label	Ref.
Various	January 28, 2021	CD; digital download; streaming	P Nation; Kakao M	
