= Retro Futurism =

EP by Triple H
- Released: July 18, 2018
- Genre: K-pop; dance-pop; new jack swing; synth-funk; R&B; funktronica
- Length: 13:53
- Label: Cube
- Producer: JayJay; E'Dawn; Lim Kwang-wook; Yummy Tone; Hyuna; 1of1; Lee Dong-wook; ELTO

Triple H chronology
199X (2017)	Retro Futurism (2018)

Singles from Retro Futurism
- 1. "Retro Future" Released: July 18, 2018

Retro Futurism (stylized as REtro Futurism) is the second and final extended play by South Korean co-ed group Triple H. It was released on July 18, 2018 by Cube Entertainment, with "Retro Future" serving as its lead-single.

== Background and release ==
On June 26, 2018, a source from Cube Entertainment stated that the group will be making a comeback on July 18 with no further details. On the same day, the group revealed through a magazine interview that theme for this album will be the collaboration of retro and futurism, resulting in the album's name, Retro Futurism. They also revealed that they were going to a time where people were using folder phones and pagers, and also were inspired by retro singers. On July 13, the group revealed the track list through a video on various platforms.

The EP was released on July 18, 2018, through several music portals, including MelOn in South Korea and iTunes for the global market.

== Track listing ==
No.	Title	Lyrics	Music	Arrangement	Length
1.	"Feeling" (느낌)	JayJay (MosPick); Hyuna; E'Dawn	JayJay (MosPick); E'Dawn	JayJay (MosPick)	3:29
2.	"Retro Future"	Hyuna; E'Dawn; Lim Kwang-wook; Yummy Tone	Lim Kwang-wook; Yummy Tone; Hyuna; E'Dawn	Lim Kwang-wook; Yummy Tone	3:15
3.	"Show ME"	1of1; E'Dawn	1of1; Lee Dong-wook	1of1; ELTO	3:54
4.	"Retro Future" (Inst.)		Lim Kwang-wook; Yummy Tone; Hyuna; E'Dawn	Lim Kwang-wook; Yummy Tone; Hyuna; E'Dawn	3:15
Total length:					13:53

== Charts ==
Chart (2018)	Peak position
South Korean Albums (Gaon)	8
