= Crazy (4Minute song) =

2015 song by 4Minute

Single by 4Minute

from the EP Crazy
- Released: February 9, 2015
- Genre: Hip hop; dance
- Length: 3:12
- Label: Cube
- Songwriters: Seo Jae-woo; Big Ssancho; Son Young-jin; Hyuna
- Producers: Seo Jae-woo; Big Ssancho; Son Young-jin

4Minute singles chronology
"Cold Rain" (2015)	"Crazy" (2015)	"Hate" (2016)

Music video
- "Crazy" on YouTube

"Crazy" (Korean: 미쳐; RR: Micheo) is a song recorded by South Korean girl group 4Minute for their sixth extended play, Crazy (2015). The song was written and produced by Seo Jae-woo, Big Ssancho, and Son Young-jin, with co–writing from group member Hyuna. It was released on February 9, 2015 by Cube Entertainment as the second and final single from the EP. A hip hop and dance song with trap influences, it sees the group returning to their signature hip hop indebted sound.

Upon release, "Crazy" received positive reviews from music critics, who praised its production and hip hop sound, as well as 4Minute's vocal delivery. In 2019, Billboard included the song on their list of the 100 best K-pop songs of the 2010s decade. Commercially, it debuted and peaked at number three on South Korea's Gaon Digital Chart, and reached number two on the US Billboard World Digital Songs chart. As of December 2015, the song has sold 664,249 digital units in South Korea.

An accompanying black and white music video was uploaded to 4Minute's YouTube channel simultaneously with the single release, and features moving camera-angle shots of the group performing constant choreography to the song. 4Minute promoted "Crazy" with televised live performances on various South Korean music programs, including M! Countdown, Music Bank, and Inkigayo. The song was also included on the setlist of their April 2015 solo concert in Myanmar.

== Background and release ==
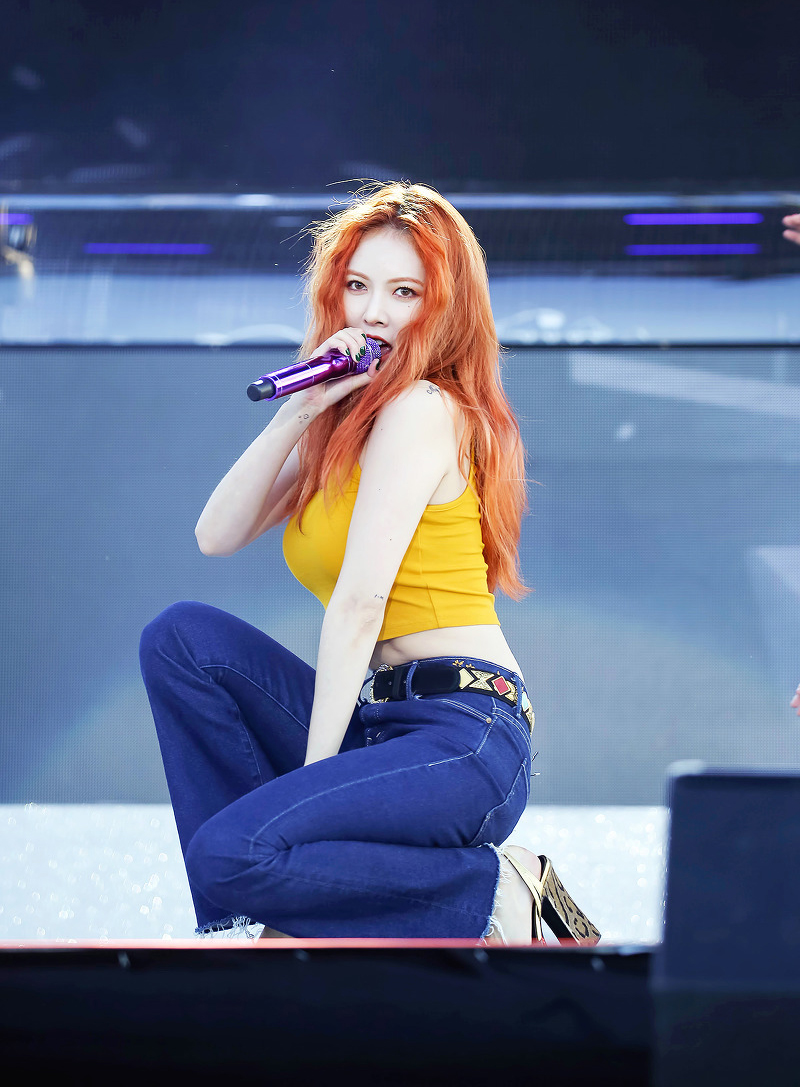
Hyuna (pictured) co-wrote the lyrics of "Crazy".

Following the release of their fifth extended play 4Minute World in 2014, 4Minute took hiatus for nearly one year. On January 23, 2015, the group announced a return to music with their sixth EP, titled Crazy. Crazy yielded two lead singles. The first one, "Cold Rain", was released on January 26, 2015, through Cube Entertainment. "Crazy", the second single from the EP, was made available for digital download and streaming on February 9, 2015. The song was serviced to Korean Broadcasting System radio stations on February 10, 2015. Group member Hyuna co-wrote the song with its producers, Seo Jae-woo, Big Ssancho and Son Young-jin. Talking to Vice in 2015, Hyuna admitted that the song expressed 4Minute's true colours. Gayoon elaborated about the sonic direction:

"For the past two releases, we came out with songs that were easy to listen to, and focused on the general public with easy-to-follow concepts. Matter of fact, we actually went back to the 'classic' 4Minute vibe with 'Crazy', but with a bolder spin on it."

== Music and lyrics ==
"Crazy"
A 19-second sample of "Crazy", a hip hop and dance song with low-pitched beats the features horn loops, thumping synths and Middle Eastern flutes.

"Crazy" is composed in the key of G major, with a fast tempo of 176 beats per minute, and runs for 3:12. Musically, "Crazy" has a more hip hop indebted sound that recalls the "urban-edginess" of the group's early tracks. It has been described as a hip hop and dance track with elements of trap. The song employs low-pitched beats, twisted horn hooks and siren-like synths in its production. "Crazy" makes use of a strong "throbbing" bassline and turbo-powered drum machines, set over snare beat twists and clapping turns. The song incorporates an instrumental breakdown that is composed of "trumpeting" synths and Middle Eastern-style flutes. Driven by heavy brass loops, the track changes direction in a "build-up-drop-down drop-off" pattern, deriving its style from EDM. The song features "sharp" rap verses from Jiyoon and Hyuna, "pulsing" vocals from Sohyun and Jihyun, and melodic belts from Gayoon, who performs on the pre-chorus. During its lyrics, 4Minute taunts the listener into the song's titular craziness and urges them to have fun.

== Reception ==
=== Critical reception ===
"Crazy" was met with positive reviews from music critics. In his review for Vice, Jakob Dorof wrote that the song "pushes hot genres like trap and EDM harder and farther than pretty much anybody in global mainstream music." Writing for Billboard, Jeff Benjamin praised the song for its fierce production and the group's energetic vocal performance. In another review for Fuse, Benjamin included the track as one of the 10 best dance songs of February 2015, and labelled it as "one of the biggest club bangers" of the year. Jacques Peterson of Idolator opined that 4Minute had "reinvented themselves into ferocious club kids with the relentlessly fierce 'Crazy'." He added that "it's the closest a female K-pop act has got to displaying Rihanna levels of badassery in years." Scott Interrante from PopMatters described the song as "loud and aggressive," and felt that "everything about the song, from the rapid-fire rapping" to the production and the group's "sharp choreography" translated into "crazy." Hwang Sun-up of IZM called the song's production "outstanding," which he felt blended with the imagery and concept of the track and also praised the group's vocal performance. In a separate review for Spin, Dorof listed "Crazy" as one of the K-pop highlights of 2015. He praised the song for its production and the group's performance, and dubbed the track as a "banger." In her ranking of 4Minutes' songs, music critic Tamar Herman named the track the best song of their career, labelling it as "one of the fiercest K-pop song of the decade" and lauding the song's "off-kilter composition." Billboard and Idolator listed "Crazy" as one of the best K-pop songs of 2015. The former placed it on their decade-end list of the 100 greatest K-pop songs of the 2010s at number 52, with the magazine commending the production and "the impactful delivery of the domineering raps and dynamic verses."

=== Awards ===
"Crazy" achieved the top spot on various South Korean weekly music programs, such as Mnet's M! Countdown, MBC Music's Show Champion, SBS' Inkigayo, and MBC's Show! Music Core due to its success on digital platforms. The song won seven music show awards, including two consecutive wins on M! Countdown, Show Champion, and Inkigayo garnering a total of seven awards. The group's win on Show! Music Core marked their first win in 7 years on the music program since debut.

Music program awards
Program	Date	Ref.
Show Champion	February 18, 2015	
Show Champion	February 25, 2015	
M Countdown	February 19, 2015	
M Countdown	February 26, 2015	
Inkigayo	February 22, 2015	
Inkigayo	March 1, 2015	
Show! Music Core	February 21, 2015	

=== Commercial performance ===
Commercially, "Crazy" debuted and peaked at number three on South Korea's Gaon Digital Chart on the chart issue dated February 8–14, 2015. The song performed identically on the component Download Chart, selling 152,560 digital units in its first week of release. "Crazy" was the sixth best-performing song in February 2015 on the Gaon Monthly Digital Chart, based on digital sales, streaming, and background music (instrumental track) downloads. As of December 2015, "Crazy" has sold over 664,249 digital units in South Korea. In addition, the song peaked at number two on the US Billboard World Digital Song Sales chart on the week of March 21, 2015.

== Music video and promotion ==
In the lead-up to the release of "Crazy", the group released photo and video teasers for the track, which served as a promotional tool for their return. An accompanying music video was uploaded to 4Minute's YouTube channel on February 9, 2015. For the visual, a choreography by Parris Goebel was commissioned, who had previously worked with Jennifer Lopez. Portrayed in black and white, the video features "moving camera-angle" shots of the group performing "non-stop" choreography while wearing sportswear and bucket hats. Discussing the choreography behind the video, Sohyun stated that it was "far more difficult to get down" as compared to their previous ones. Interrante felt that "the hair styles and fashion, along with many of the girls’ postures and poses, specifically recall American hip-hop culture, and subsequently African-American culture." Benjamin opined that the "multiple line changes" throughout the dance-routine made it "one of K-pop's top dances to watch for on the live stage." For Dorof, the video contained "some of the year's fiercest choreo[graphy]."

To promote the song and Crazy, 4Minute made appearances on several South Korean music programs around February and March 2015. They performed the song for the first time for M! Countdown on February 12, 2015, as part of their comeback stage. The following three days, the group appeared on Music Bank, Show! Music Core, and Inkigayo to perform the song. The song was also included on the setlist of their solo concert entitled 4Minute Fan Bash In Myanmar in Yangon, Myanmar, held on April 4, 2015.

== Track listing ==
- Digital download / streaming
1. "Crazy" – 3:12

== Credits and personnel ==
Credits adapted from Melon.

- Seo Jae-woo – lyricist, composer, producer
- Big Ssancho – lyricist, composer, producer
- Son Young-jin – lyricist, composer, producer
- Hyuna – lyricist
- 4Minute – vocals

== Charts ==
=== Weekly charts ===
Weekly chart performance
Chart (2015)	Peak position
South Korea (Gaon)	3
US World Digital Song Sales (Billboard)	2

=== Monthly charts ===
Monthly chart performance
Chart (2015)	Peak position
South Korea (Gaon)	6

=== Year-end charts ===
2015 year-end charts
Chart (2015)	Position
South Korea (Gaon)	94

== Release history ==
Release dates and formats for "Crazy"
Region	Date	Format(s)	Label	Ref.
Various	February 9, 2015	Digital download; streaming	Cube Entertainment	
