= Q&A (Hyuna song) =

Single by Hyuna

from the EP Attitude
- Language: Korean; English
- Released: May 2, 2024
- Length: 2:46
- Label: At Area
- Composers: Hyuna; Greg Bonnick & Hayden Chapman (LDN Noise); GroovyRoom; Peter Renshaw; Shorelle
- Lyricists: Hyuna; Young Chance; Bang Hye-hyun; Na Jung-ah (153/Joombas); Kwaca; GroovyRoom

Hyuna singles chronology
"Nabillera" (2022)	"Q&A" (2024)	"Mrs. Nail" (2025)

Music video
- "Q&A" on YouTube

"Q&A" is a song recorded by South Korean singer-songwriter Hyuna, released on May 2, 2024, under At Area, as a promotional single from her ninth EP, Attitude. An accompanying music video was also released. The song marks Hyuna's first release under the new label At Area, following her departure from her previous company, P Nation, in August 2022.

== Composition ==
The song was written by Hyuna, Bang Hye-hyun, Na Jung-ah (153/Joombas), Kwaca and GroovyRoom. The song is composed in the key A-flat minor and has 130 beats per minute and a running time of 2 minutes and 46 seconds.

== Music video ==
On May 1, the official teaser for the music video of "Q&A" was released. On May 2, the official music video was released. Hyuna held an online comeback show to commemorate the release of her EP through her official YouTube channel.

== Promotion ==
On May 2, Hyuna held her first and only comeback stage for the song on Mnet's M Countdown, as the only live performance of the song's music show promotion. On May 5, Hyuna performed the song on Daegu Hiphop Festival, where she also performed her other hit songs such as "Bubble Pop!" (2011), "Red" (2014), and "I'm Not Cool" (2021).

== Credits and personnel ==
Credits adapted from Melon.

- Hyuna – vocals, songwriting, composing, chorus
- GroovyRoom – songwriting, composing, producer
- Bang Hye-hyun – songwriting
- Na Jung-ah (153/Joombas) – songwriting
- Kwaca – songwriting
- LDN Noise (Greg Bonnick & Hayden Chapman) – composing, arrangement
- Peter Renshaw – composing, arrangement
- Shorelle – composing
- Young Chance – composing
- Noisy Choice – arrangement

== Charts ==
Chart performance for "Q&A"
Chart (2024)	Peak position
South Korea Download (Circle)	52

== Release history ==
Release history for "Q&A"
Region	Date	Format	Label
Various	May 2, 2024	Digital download; streaming	At Area
