= Shine (Pentagon song) =

2018 single by Pentagon

Single by Pentagon

from the EP Positive
- Language: Korean; Japanese
- Released: April 2, 2018; August 29, 2018 (JP)
- Recorded: 2018
- Genre: K-pop
- Length: 3:18
- Label: Cube Entertainment; Kakao M
- Songwriters: E'Dawn; Hui; Yuto; Wooseok
- Producers: Flow Blow; E'Dawn; Hui

Pentagon singles chronology
| "Runaway" (2017) | "Shine" (2018) | "Naughty Boy" (2018) |

Music video
- "Shine (빛나리)" on YouTube

"Shine" (Korean: 빛나리; RR: bitnari,) is a song recorded by South Korean boy group Pentagon. It was released on April 2, 2018, by Cube Entertainment and distributed by LOEN Entertainment as the lead single from the group's third extended play Positive. The Japanese version of the song was released by Cube Entertainment Japan, distributed by Universal Music Japan on August 29, 2018. The track was written by E'Dawn, Hui, Yuto, Wooseok with Flow Blow credited as the producer. This is the last Korean single to feature E'Dawn due to his hiatus and subsequent departure from the group.

The Korean music video for the song was uploaded onto 1theK's YouTube channel simultaneously with the single's release. To promote the single, the group performed on several South Korean music show programs, such as M Countdown and Inkigayo.

== Composition ==
"Shine" is a piano riff and minimal rhythm of this upbeat track will remind listeners of that exciting and heart beating moment of love. It was composed and written by E'Dawn, Hui, Yuto, Wooseok. Flow Blow was credited as the producer.

== Background and release ==
Prior to the release of the song, teasers featuring photos of Pentagon from the extended play's photoshoot, a snippet of the song and clips from its music video were released online in March 2018. The song was officially released on April 2, 2018, by Cube Entertainment and distributed by Kakao M as the group's seventh single. It served as the lead single of their third extended play, Positive. The dance practice video was uploaded on April 17, 2018.

The Japanese version was released on August 29, 2018, by Cube Entertainment Japan, distributed by Universal Music Japan. The song written by Shoko Fujibayashi, and member Yuto. It was included in the 2018 release of the group's third Japanese mini-album, Shine. A 2020 Japanese version of the song was released on September 23, 2020 on their first full-length Japanese album Universe: The History.

== Music videos ==
The music video for "Shine" was uploaded to 1theK and Pentagon's official YouTube channel on April 2, 2018, in conjunction with the release of the single. The song eventually becoming a sleeper hit by word of mouth from listeners due to its unique melody and powerful choreography. After seven months and nine days later, on November 11 "Shine" music video surpassed 100 million combined views. On July 1, 2020, the music video reached 200 million views on the 1theK's channel.

The music video for the Japanese version of the song was uploaded to Cube Entertainment Japan's YouTube channel on August 29, 2018. The music video was re-uploaded on 1theK's official YouTube channel on December 5, 2018.

== Live performances ==
Pentagon promoted "Shine" by performing on several music programs in South Korea including Inkigayo, M Countdown, Music Bank, Show Champion, Show! Music Core and Simply K-Pop.

== Commercial performance ==
A month after its release, "Shine" debuted at number 85 on the Gaon Digital Chart. Subsequently, the company announced that the promotion period was extended by two weeks. The song peaked at number 27 two weeks later. Pentagon made their debut on Top 10 Billboard's World Digital Song Sales chart.

== Charts ==
=== Weekly charts ===
Chart performance for "Shine"
| Chart (2018) | Peak position |
|---|---|
| South Korea (Gaon Digital) | 27 |
| South Korea (Gaon Download) | 13 |
| South Korea (K-pop Hot 100) | 24 |
| US World Digital Song Sales (Billboard) | 6 |

=== Monthly charts ===
| Chart (2018) | Peak position |
|---|---|
| South Korea (Gaon) | 38 |

== Credits and personnel ==
Credits adapted from Melon.

- Pentagon – Vocals
  - E'Dawn – Lyricist, composer
  - Hui – Lyricist, composer
  - Yuto – Lyricist
  - Wooseok – Lyricist
- Flow Blow – Composer, arranger
- Shoko Fujibayashi – lyricist (Japanese version)

== Accolades ==
Year-end lists
| Critic/Publication | List | Rank | Ref. |
|---|---|---|---|
| Billboard | 100 Best Songs of 2018: Critics' Picks | 69 | |
| Billboard | 20 Best K-pop Songs of 2018: Critics' Picks | 2 | |
| Bugs | 2018 Year End Top 100 | 89 | |
| Dazed | 20 Best K-pop songs of 2018 | 18 | |
| Paper | Top 20 K-Pop Songs of 2018 | 6 | |
| SBS PopAsia | 25 Best K-pop Dances of 2018 | 10 | |
| SBS PopAsia | Top 100 Asian Pop songs of 2018 | 8 | |

Decade-end lists
| Critic/Publication | List | Rank | Ref. |
|---|---|---|---|
| Billboard | 100 Greatest K-Pop Songs of the 2010s: Staff List | 35 | |

Awards
| Year | Organization | Category | Result | Ref. |
|---|---|---|---|---|
| 2018 | Mnet Asian Music Awards | Song of the Year (Daesang) | Nominated | |
| 2018 | Mnet Asian Music Awards | Best Dance Performance – Male Group | Nominated | |
| 2018 | MBC Plus X Genie Music Awards | Song of the Year (Daesang) | Nominated | |
| 2018 | MBC Plus X Genie Music Awards | Best Male Dance Performance | Nominated | |
| 2018 | Korea Popular Music Awards | Best Digital Song | Nominated | |
| 2018 | Korea Popular Music Awards | Best Group Dance Track | Nominated | |

== Release history ==
Release dates and formats for "Shine"
| Version | Region | Date | Format | Label |
|---|---|---|---|---|
| Korean | Worldwide | April 2, 2018 | Digital download; streaming | Cube Entertainment; Kakao M |
| Japanese | Worldwide | August 29, 2018 | Digital download; streaming | Cube Entertainment Japan |
