= Ping Pong (Hyuna and Dawn song) =

2021 single Hyuna & Dawn

Single by Hyuna & Dawn

from the EP 1+1=1
- Language: Korean; English; Spanish
- Released: September 9, 2021
- Genre: K-pop; dance-pop; moombahton
- Length: 2:38
- Label: P Nation
- Composers: Hyuna; Dawn; Yoo Geon-hyeong; Philip Kwon; Space One
- Lyricists: Hyuna; Dawn

Hyuna singles chronology
| "I'm Not Cool" (2021) | "Ping Pong" (2021) | "Nabillera" (2022) |

Dawn singles chronology
| "Dawndididawn" (2020) | "Ping Pong" (2021) | "Stupid Cool" (2022) |

Music video
- "Ping Pong" on YouTube

"Ping Pong" (stylized in all caps) is a collaborative song recorded by South Korean singer-songwriter Hyuna and South Korean rapper Dawn, released on September 9, 2021, under P Nation, simultaneously with the accompanied music video and the EP 1+1=1.

== Composition ==
The song was written by Hyuna and Dawn. The song “PING PONG” is a moombahton Dance song with an intense lead sound composed of Moombahton Rhythm and 880 Bass sound. It was written and composed jointly by Hyuna and DAWN. It is an impressive song that expresses the image of a lover in love with cute and popping lyrics, like a ping-pong ball moving back and forth.

== Music video ==
On September 6, a teaser for the music video of "Ping Pong" was released. On September 9, the official music video for "Ping Pong" was released into the public.

== Accolades ==
Award and nominations for "Ping Pong"
| Year | Organization | Award | Result | Ref. |
|---|---|---|---|---|
| 2021 | Asian Pop Music Awards | Best Collaboration | Won | |
| 2021 | Asian Pop Music Awards | People's Choice Award (Overseas) | Won | |

== Credits and personnel ==
Credits adapted from Melon.

- Hyuna – vocals, songwriting, composing, chorus
- Dawn – vocals, songwriting, composing, chorus
- Yoo Geon-hyeong – producer
- Philip Kwon - producer
- Space One – producer

== Charts ==
Chart performance for "Ping Pong"
| Chart (2021) | Peak position |
|---|---|
| South Korea (Gaon) | 105 |
| South Korea (Kpop Hot 100) | 45 |
| US World Digital Song Sales (Billboard) | 10 |

== Release history ==
Release history for "Ping Pong"
| Region | Date | Format | Label |
|---|---|---|---|
| Various | September 9, 2021 | Digital download; streaming | P Nation |
