= Attitude (Hyuna EP) =

- Digital cover

EP by Hyuna
- Released: May 2, 2024
- Length: 11:09
- Language: Korean
- Label: At Area

Hyuna chronology
| Nabillera (2022) | Attitude (2024) |

Singles from Attitude
- 1. "Q&A" Released: May 2, 2024

Attitude is the ninth extended play (EP) by South Korean singer-songwriter and rapper Hyuna. It was released on May 2, 2024, through At Area. The EP consists of four tracks, including the title track "Q&A". The EP mark Hyuna's first release under the new label At Area, following her departure from her previous company, P Nation, in August 2022.

== Background and release ==
During the 2023, Hyuna teased fans different times through social medias telling that she was working on her new music. On November 6, 2023, At Area announced that Hyuna signed a contract with them, and few days later she released on her official YouTube account a music video of her new promo single, "Attitude". In April 2024, Hyuna and At Area, announced her new EP, titled "Attitude", releasing a schedule poster of her comeback, announcing the release date of the project on May 2, 2024, with the title-track "Q&A". The singer previous stated that for the album she was working with the producers duo GroovyRoom. The producers, produced the album and the title-tracks. The EP was released on May 2 through many Korean online music services, including Melon. For the global market, the EP was made available on iTunes and Spotify. It was also released in physical format.

== Composition ==
The EP consists of four tracks. The album includes the title-track "Q&A" and the promo single "Attitude". GroovyRoom is credited as one of the composers of all the four songs. Other notable names that worked for the album are J.Y. Park, Gemini, Changmo, Giriboy and more.

== Promotion ==
On May 1, a teaser for the music video of "Q&A" was released. The following day, the official music video of "Q&A" was released. On the same day, Hyuna held an online comeback show to commemorate the release of her EP through her official YouTube channel.

== Track listing ==
Attitude track listing
| No. | Title | Lyrics | Music | Arrangement | Length |
|---|---|---|---|---|---|
| 1. | "Attitude" | Hyuna; Kwaca; Evan | GroovyRoom; Hyuna; Kwaka | GroovyRoom | 1:55 |
| 2. | "Q&A" | Hyuna; Bang Hye-hyun; Na Jung-ah (153/Joombas); Kwaca; GroovyRoom | Greg Bonnick & Hayden Chapman (LDN Noise); GroovyRoom; Peter Renshaw; Shorelle; Young Chance; Hyuna | GroovyRoom; LDN Noise; Peter Renshaw; Noisy Choice | 2:46 |
| 3. | "Ah!" (featuring Gemini) | Hyuna; Jxxdxn; Gemini | Boycold; Giriboy; Jinbo the Superfreak; Junny; GroovyRoom; Gemini; Hyuna | Boycold; Giriboy | 3:30 |
| 4. | "RSVP" (featuring Changmo) | Hyuna; GroovyRoom; Kwaca; Evan; Changmo | GroovyRoom; J.Y. Park "The Asiansoul"; Changmo; Isha; Hyuna | GroovyRoom; Goneisback | 2:59 |
| Total length: | | | | | 11:09 |

== Charts ==
Chart performance for Attitude
| Chart (2024) | Peak position |
|---|---|
| South Korean Albums (Circle) | 23 |

== Release history ==
Release dates and formats for Attitude
| Region | Date | Format | Label | Ref. |
|---|---|---|---|---|
| Various | May 2, 2024 | CD; digital download; streaming | At Area | |
