= 199X =

EP by Triple H
- Released: May 1, 2017
- Genres: K-pop; dance-pop; new jack swing; R&B; synth-funk
- Length: 16:50
- Labels: Cube; LOEN
- Producers: Seo Jaewoo; Kang Dongha; Devine Channel; Big Sancho; Son Youngjin; Wonderkid; Shinkung; BreadBeat

Triple H chronology
199X (2017)	Retro Futurism (2018)

Singles from 199X
- 1. "365 Fresh" Released: May 1, 2017

199X is the debut extended play by South Korean co-ed group, Triple H, composed of solo singer Hyuna, Pentagon member Hui, and former Pentagon member Dawn (formally known as E'Dawn). It was released by Cube Entertainment and LOEN Entertainment on May 1, 2017. The song "365 Fresh" was released as the title track.

== Background and release ==
On April 13, 2017, the first teaser images were released, revealing the three members of Triple H. A few days later, a concept preview video was released setting a release date for May 1, 2017, at 12 pm. On April 20, the full track list was released, revealing the name of the title track as "365 Fresh" and for the EP of five songs as 199X. On April 26, an audio teaser of the upcoming EP was released, revealing a short version of each song. From April 27 to April 29, individual teasers were released, starting with Hyuna, followed by Hui and E'Dawn.

The EP was released on May 1, 2017, through several music portals, including Melon in South Korea and iTunes for the global market.

== Promotion ==
=== Single ===
"365 Fresh" was released as the title track from the EP. The song debuted at number 81 on the Gaon Digital Chart with 26,199 digitals downloads sold. A music video was released in conjunction with the EP on May 1. The story follows as each member committed a crime that leads them to find each other and be followed by the police.

== Commercial performance ==
199X debuted at number 4 on the Gaon Album Chart on the chart issue dated April 30 - May 6, 2017. In its second week, the EP fell to number 32.

The EP also charted at number 10 on Billboard's World Albums on the week ending May 20, 2017.

The EP entered at number 22 on the Gaon Album Chart for the month of May 2017 for 5,157 physical copies sold.

== Track listing ==
Digital download

No.	Title	Lyrics	Music	Arrangement	Length
1.	"Sunflower" (바라기)	Hyuna; Hui; E'Dawn; Kang Dongha	Seo Jaewoo; Kang Dongha	Seo Jaewoo; Kang Dongha	2:29
2.	"365 Fresh"	Seo Jaewoo; Kang Dongha; Devine Channel; Hyuna; E'Dawn	Seo Jaewoo; Kang Dongha; Devine Channel	Seo Jaewoo; Kang Dongha	3:39
3.	"What's Going On?" (꿈이야 생시야)	Big Sancho; Son Youngjin; Hyuna; E'Dawn	Big Sancho; Son Youngjin	Big Sancho; Son Youngjin	3:29
4.	"Girl Girl Girl"	Wonderkid; Shinkung; BreadBeat; Hyuna; E'Dawn	Wonderkid; Shinkung; BreadBeat	Wonderkid; Shinkung; BreadBeat	3:18
5.	"365 Fresh" (Instrumental)		Seo Jaewoo; Kang Dongha; Devine Channel		3:39
Total length:					16:50

== Charts ==
Chart (2017)	Peak position
Japan (Oricon Albums Chart)	187
South Korea (Gaon Album Chart)	4
US World Albums (Billboard)	10

== Release history ==
Region	Date	Format	Label
South Korea	May 1, 2017	CD, Digital download	Cube Entertainment; LOEN Entertainment
Worldwide	May 1, 2017	Digital download	Cube Entertainment; LOEN Entertainment
