= Dawn (rapper) =

South Korean rapper and singer-songwriter (born 1994)

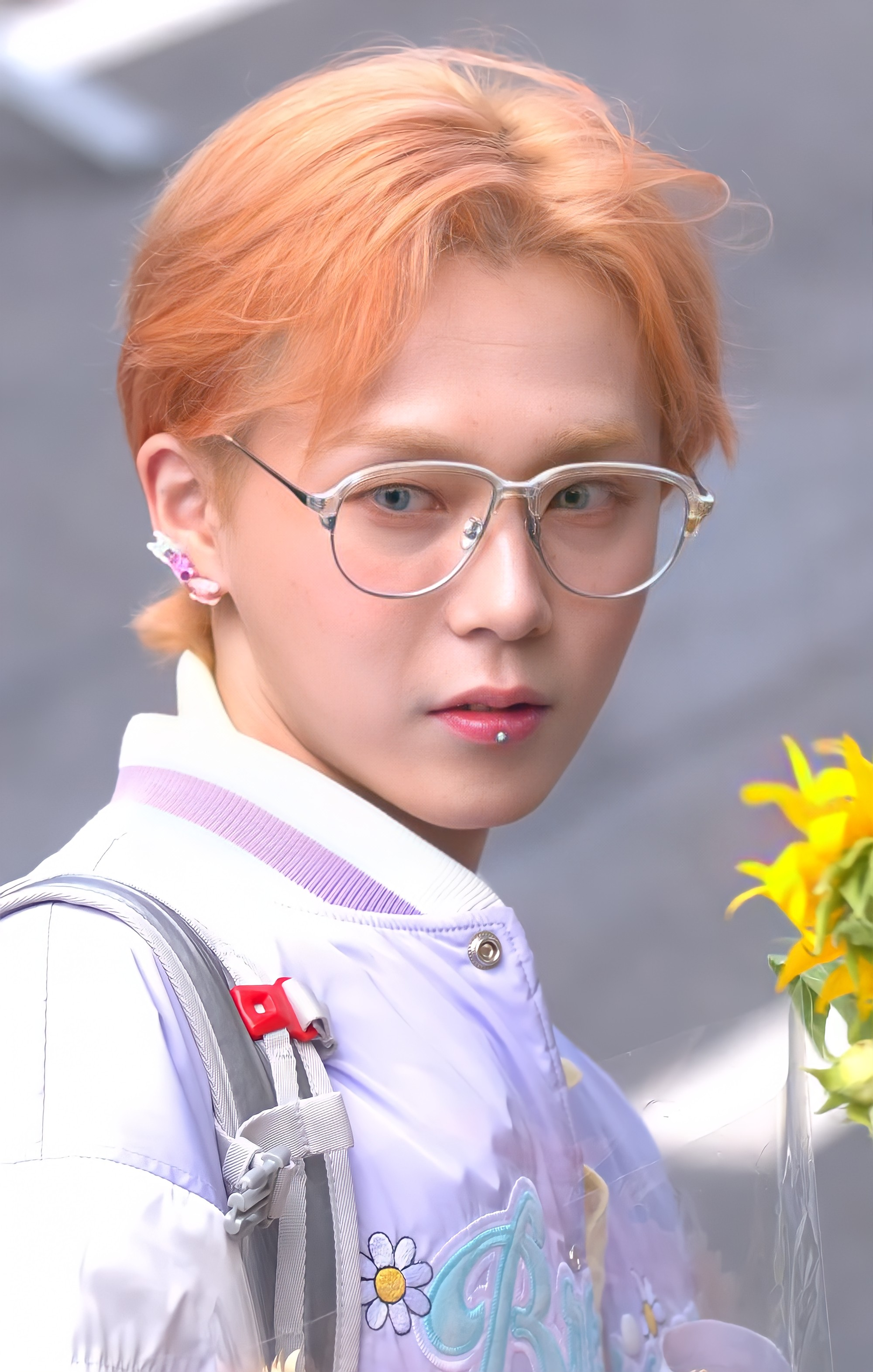
- Dawn in July 2022
- Born: Kim Hyo-jong; June 1, 1994 (age 31); Hwasun-gun, South Korea
- Other name: E'Dawn
- Occupations: Rapper; singer; dancer
- Musical career
- Genres: K-pop; hip hop; dance
- Instrument: Vocals
- Years active: 2016–present
- Labels: Cube; P Nation; At Area
- Formerly of: Pentagon; Triple H; United Cube

Korean name
- Hangul: 김효종
- RR: Gim Hyojong
- MR: Kim Hyojong

Kim Hyo-jong (Korean: 김효종; born June 1, 1994), known professionally as Dawn (던; formerly E'Dawn), is a South Korean rapper and dancer. Dawn is best known as a rapper, singer and songwriter of the South Korean boy band Pentagon, releasing nine EPs in both Korean and Japanese before his departure from Cube Entertainment in 2018. Dawn also participated in the group Triple H alongside (then) bandmate Hui and labelmate Hyuna for the release of two EPs.

Dawn made his solo debut on November 5, 2019, releasing the single "Money".

== Career ==
=== 2016–2018: Cube Entertainment, Pentagon, and Triple H ===
Dawn debuted on July 10, 2016, under the name of E'Dawn, with the group Pentagon under Cube Entertainment as a dancer and rapper. The group was formed through a variety show called Pentagon Maker. Despite E'Dawn being eliminated from the program, he was added to the group's final lineup alongside Yan An and Shinwon. E'Dawn contributed to the group's debut EP, Pentagon, as a songwriter, writing lyrics for the tracks "Lukewarm" and "Organic Song", as well as contributing music to the latter. He would continue to write songs and music for the group (including "Runaway" and "Shine") until his departure.

On April 4, 2017, it was announced that E'Dawn would be debuting in a new group called Triple H alongside bandmate Hui and labelmate Hyuna, and the trio would be starring in a new show called Triple H Fun Agency. The group made their debut on May 1, 2017, with the EP 199X. E'Dawn once again contributed as songwriter, writing all tracks including the lead single "365 Fresh". The album reached #4 on the Gaon Album Chart and #10 on the Billboard World Albums Chart. The group released a follow-up EP, Retro Futurism, in 2018. E'Dawn contributed to the lyrics and music for the lead single "Retro Future" alongside the other three tracks on the album.

After E'Dawn announced his relationship with Hyuna in August 2018, Cube Entertainment announced he would be absent from Pentagon's upcoming EP, Thumbs Up!, though he would still be credited as songwriter for "Naughty Boy" and "Skateboard". On September 13, it was announced that Cube had terminated E'Dawn's and Hyuna's contracts, citing that they were unable to maintain trust with them. E'Dawn's departure from Cube and Pentagon was officially confirmed on November 14, 2018.

=== 2019–2022: P Nation, debut as Dawn and Dawndididawn ===
On January 23, Psy announced via Instagram that E'Dawn had signed a contract with his new label, P Nation, alongside Hyuna. On October 18, it was announced that E'Dawn would be redebuting as a soloist under the name "Dawn", with new single "Money" on November 5.

On April 29, 2020, he was a part of the Old X New (Original Television Soundtrack) album for the 본격연예 한밤 (Late Night E-News) show, with the song "그건 너 (It's You)".

In September 2020, it was announced that Dawn will make a comeback with his first EP Dawndididawn, which was released on October 9, 2020. The title track "Dawndididawn (던디리던)" featured fellow P Nation artist Jessi.

On March 3, he was a part of Demian's new song "Love%".

On September 9, Dawn and Hyuna collaborated to release their duet EP 1+1=1.

On June 7, 2022, it was announced that Dawn would be attending the J-Rim Super Nova Festival with Hyuna, taking place on July 2–3, 2022.

On June 8, 2022, Psy, the head of his agency P Nation, released a teaser image announcing Dawn's return on June 16, 2022, with the digital single "Stupid Cool".

=== 2023–present: At Area and Narcissus ===
On August 29, 2022, P Nation announced that Dawn would be leaving the company after deciding not to renew his contract. On January 30, 2023, Dawn had signed a new contract with the hip hop label, At Area.

On September 15, 2023, Dawn released his EP Narcissus, with two lead singles "Star" and "Heart".

== Personal life ==
=== Relationship ===
On August 2, 2018, Dawn revealed that he has been in a relationship with Hyuna since May 2016. Their engagement was announced on February 3, 2022. In November 2022, Hyuna posted on her Instagram account that the couple had separated.

=== Military service ===
On October 12, 2023, Dawn announced that he was fulfilling his military mandatory service as a social service worker. He was discharged on July 11, 2025.

== Discography ==
=== Extended plays ===
Title	Details	Peak chart positions	Sales
Title	Details	KOR	Sales
Dawndididawn	Released: October 9, 2020; Labels: P Nation; Formats: Digital download, streaming; Track listing: 1. "Dawndididawn" (featuring Jessi); 2. "Still" (featuring Crush); 3. "Tantara"; 4. "Butterfly"; 5. "Ordinary Night"	—	—N/a
Narcissus	Released: September 15, 2023; Labels: At Area; Formats: CD, digital download, streaming; Track listing: 1. "Star" (featuring 10cm); 2. "Heart"; 3. "I Don't"; 4. "Fallin'" (featuring pH-1); 5. "Seasons" (featuring Gemini); 6. "Memory" (featuring Kim Sa-wol); 7. "Lullaby"; 8. "Abyss"	50	KOR: 2,484
Collaboration
1+1=1 (with Hyuna)	Released: September 9, 2021; Label: P Nation; Formats: CD, digital download	13	KOR: 14,824
"—" denotes releases that did not chart or were not released in that region.

=== Singles ===
Title	Year	Peak chart positions				Album
Title	Year	KOR Circle	KOR Hot	SGP	US World	Album
"Money"	2019	—	—	—	11	Non-album singles
"Dawndididawn" (던디리던) (featuring Jessi)	2020	—	—	—	13	Dawndididawn
"Ping Pong" (with Hyuna)	2021	101	45	23	10	1+1=1
"Stupid Cool"	2022	—	—	—	—	Non-album singles
"Dear My Light" (빛이 나는 너에게)	2023	16	—	—	—	Non-album singles
"Star"	2023	—	—	—	—	Narcissus
"Heart"	2023	—	—	—	—	Narcissus
"—" denotes releases that did not chart or were not released in that region.

=== As featured artist ===
Title	Year	Peak chart positions	Album
Title	Year	KOR Down.	Album
"Purple" Hyuna feat. Dawn	2017	—	Following
"Party, Feel, Love" Hyuna feat. Dawn	2021	148	I'm Not Cool
"Love%" Demian feat. Dawn	2021	—	A Blue not Blues
"Ride For Me" DeVita feat. Dawn	2023	—	Naughty
"Attention" Gemini feat. Blasé and Dawn	2023	—	Love Sick
"Vanilla Sky" Devine Channel feat. Dawn	2023	—	The Dawn of the Black and Ivory
"I" (아이) Park Bom feat. Dawn	2023	17	Non-album single
"IG" GroovyRoom feat. Jay Park, Vince, Gemini, and Dawn	2024	84	At H1gher

=== Soundtrack appearances ===
Title	Year	Album	Show	Ref.
"It's You" (그건 너)	2020	Old X New	Late Night E-News (본격연예 한밤)	
"Even if we disappear" (우리 사라져도)	2023	My Demon OST Part 4	My Demon	

=== Composition credits ===
All song credits are adapted from the Korea Music Copyright Association's database, unless otherwise noted.

Title	Year	Artist	Album	Lyricist	Composer	Arranger
"Find Me"	2016	Jinho, Hongseok, Shinwon, Yan An, Dawn	Non-album single	Yes	Yes	No
"Wake Up (Intro)"	2016	Pentagon	Pentagon	Yes	No	No
"Lukewarm" (미지근해)	2016	Pentagon	Pentagon	Yes	No	No
"Organic Song" (귀 좀 막아줘)	2016	Pentagon	Pentagon	Yes	Yes	No
"Lose Yourself" (풀러)	2016	Pentagon	Five Senses	Yes	No	No
"Stay Crazy" (정신 못 차려도 돼)	2016	Pentagon	Five Senses	Yes	No	No
"Sunflower" (바라기)	2017	Triple H	199X	Yes	No	No
"365 Fresh"	2017	Triple H	199X	Yes	No	No
"What's Going On?" (꿈이야 생시야)	2017	Triple H	199X	Yes	No	No
"Girl Girl Girl"	2017	Triple H	199X	Yes	No	No
"Never" (Nation's Sons (국민의 아들))	2017	Produce 101 season 2	35 Boys 5 Concepts	Yes	No	No
"To Universe" (소중한 약속)	2017	Pentagon	Ceremony	Yes	No	No
"Nothing"	2017	Pentagon	Ceremony	Yes	No	No
"Spectacular" (스펙터클 해)	2017	Pentagon	Ceremony	Yes	No	No
"Purple" (보라색) (with Dawn)	2017	Hyuna	Following	Yes	Yes	No
"Like This"	2017	Pentagon	Demo_01	Yes	No	No
"It's Over"	2017	Pentagon	Demo_01	Yes	No	No
"One More Night" (오늘까지만)	2017	Pentagon	Demo_01	Yes	No	No
"Get That Drink" (멋있게랩)	2017	Pentagon	Demo_01	Yes	Yes	Yes
"When I Was in Love" (설렘이라는건)	2017	Pentagon	Demo_01	Yes	No	No
"Lift Off"	2017	Wooseok, Dawn	Non-album single	Yes	No	No
"Violet"	2017	Pentagon	Demo_02	Yes	No	No
"Runaway"	2017	Pentagon	Demo_02	Yes	No	No
"All Right"	2017	Pentagon	Demo_02	Yes	No	No
"Pretty Boys"	2017	Pentagon	Demo_02	Yes	Yes	Yes
"Trust Me"	2018	Yuto Adachi, Wooseok, Dawn	Non-album single	Yes	Yes	Yes
"Off-Road"	2018	Pentagon	Positive	Yes	No	No
"Shine" (빛나리)	2018	Pentagon	Positive	Yes	Yes	No
"Think About You" (생각해)	2018	Pentagon	Positive	Yes	No	No
"Do It For Fun" (재밌겠다)	2018	Pentagon	Positive	Yes	Yes	Yes
"Nothing I Can Do" (보낼 수밖에)	2018	Pentagon	Positive	Yes	No	No
"Let's Go Together" (함께 가자 우리)	2018	Pentagon	Positive	Yes	Yes	No
"Young & One"	2018	United Cube	One	Yes	No	No
"Feeling" (느낌)	2018	Triple H	Retro Futurism	Yes	Yes	No
"Retro Future"	2018	Triple H	Retro Futurism	Yes	Yes	No
"Show Me"	2018	Triple H	Retro Futurism	Yes	No	No
"Naughty Boy" (청개구리)	2018	Pentagon	Thumbs Up!	Yes	Yes	No
"Skateboard"	2018	Pentagon	Thumbs Up!	Yes	No	No
"Money"	2019	Dawn	Non-album single	Yes	Yes	No
"Money (OnlyOneOf ver.)"	2020	OnlyOneOf	Non-album single	Yes	Yes	No
"Dawndididawn" (던디리던) (featuring Jessi)	2020	Dawn	Dawndididawn	Yes	No	No
"Still" (가마니) (featuring Crush)	2020	Dawn	Dawndididawn	Yes	Yes	No
"Tantara" (딴따라)	2020	Dawn	Dawndididawn	Yes	Yes	No
"Butterfly" (호랑나비)	2020	Dawn	Dawndididawn	Yes	Yes	No
"Ordinary Night" (펑소와 똑같은 밤)	2020	Dawn	Dawndididawn	Yes	Yes	No
"Deep Dive"	2021	Hyuna & Dawn	1+1=1	Yes	Yes	No
"Ping Pong"	2021	Hyuna & Dawn	1+1=1	Yes	Yes	No
"XOXO"	2021	Hyuna & Dawn	1+1=1	Yes	Yes	No
"I Know" (우린 분명 죽을 만큼 사랑했다)	2021	Hyuna & Dawn	1+1=1	Yes	Yes	No
"Love%" (featuring Dawn)	2021	Demian	A Blue Not Blues	Yes	No	No
"I'm Not Cool"	2021	Hyuna	I'm Not Cool	Yes	No	No
"Party, Feel, Love" (featuring Dawn)	2021	Hyuna	I'm Not Cool	Yes	Yes	No
"Nabillera" (나빌레라)	2022	Hyuna	Nabillera	Yes	No	No
"Bad Dog"	2022	Hyuna	Nabillera	Yes	Yes	No
"Stupid Cool"	2022	Dawn	Non-album single	Yes	Yes	No
"Dear My Light" (빛이 나는 너에게)	2023	Dawn	Non-album single	Yes	Yes	No
"Star" (featuring 10cm)	2023	Dawn	Narcissus	Yes	Yes	No
"Heart"	2023	Dawn	Narcissus	Yes	Yes	No
"I Don't"	2023	Dawn	Narcissus	Yes	Yes	No
"Fallin'" (featuring pH-1)	2023	Dawn	Narcissus	No	Yes	No
"Seasons" (featuring Gemini)	2023	Dawn	Narcissus	Yes	Yes	No
"Memory" (기억) (featuring Kim Sa-wol)	2023	Dawn	Narcissus	Yes	Yes	No
"Lullaby" (놓고 갈게)	2023	Dawn	Narcissus	Yes	No	No
"Abyss"	2023	Dawn	Narcissus	No	Yes	No

== Filmography ==
=== Television series ===
Year	Title	Role	Notes
2016	Spark	Dexter	Cameo

=== Television shows ===
Year	Title	Notes	Ref.
2016	Pentagon Maker	Contestant	
2017	Triple H Fun "Agency"	Variety show about Triple H.	
2023	Alien HoHwiHyo"	Mockumentary starring comedian Lee Jinho, GroovyRoom's Lee Hwi-min, and Dawn.	

== Awards and nominations ==
Name of the award ceremony, year presented, award category, nominee(s) of the award, and the result of the nomination
Award ceremony	Year	Category	Nominee(s) / Work(s)	Result	Ref.
MAMA Awards	2023	Best Vocal Performance Solo	"Dear My Light"	Nominated	
MAMA Awards	2023	Song of the Year	"Dear My Light"	Nominated	
