= Following (EP) =

EP by Hyuna
- Released: August 29, 2017
- Genre: K-pop; dance-pop; R&B; hip hop
- Length: 16:24
- Label: Cube; LOEN

Hyuna chronology
A'wesome (2016)	Following (2017)	Lip & Hip (2017)

Singles from Following
- 1. "Babe" Released: August 29, 2017

Music video
- "Babe" on YouTube

Following is the sixth extended play (EP) by South Korean singer Hyuna. It was released on August 29, 2017, by Cube Entertainment and distributed by LOEN Entertainment. "Babe" was released as the lead single.

== Background ==
In May 2017, Hyuna debuted along with fellow labelmates and Pentagon members Hui and E'Dawn in a new sub-unit group. The promotions for their first mini album 199X went on until the end of the month. Later in July, Hyuna revealed in an interview for Grazia magazine that she was preparing a new comeback album to be released during the summer.

== Release ==
On August, Cube Entertainment revealed her return to the Korean music scene was supposed to happen on September, but they decided to do it sooner because Hyuna could not wait to meet with her fans again, so it was pushed forward to the end of August. The first teaser image was unveiled on August 8, with the name of the mini album being revealed later on August 17, along with black and white intimate pictures of Hyuna without make-up. The images also confirmed the EP to be released on August 29. On August 23, the company revealed the title song to be called "Babe", which was composed by Hyuna herself, Shinsadong Tiger and Beom x Nang. The tracklist was unveiled on August 24 through her official YouTube channel, along with an audio snippet of each song from the album.

The EP was officially released on August 29 through many Korean online music services, including Melon. For the global market, the EP was made available on iTunes. It was also released in physical format.

== Music video ==
On August 27, a teaser for the music video of "Babe" was released. The full music video, which was released on August 29, features Hyuna going back and forth to another dimension.

== Promotion ==
Hyuna held the first comeback stage for the album during MBC's Show Champion on August 30, where she performed the songs "Babe" and "Dart". The promotions continued on Arirang's Simply K-Pop and KBS's Music Bank on September 1, MBC's Show! Music Core on September 2, SBS's Inkigayo on September 3, and Mnet's M Countdown on September 7.

== Commercial performance ==
Following debuted at number 9 on the Gaon Album Chart on the issue dated between August 27 and September 2, 2017. For the month of August, it appeared on the monthly edition of the Gaon Album Chart at number 28, with 5,773 physical copies sold. The album also entered Billboard's World Albums Chart at number 5 on the week of September 16, 2017.

== Track listing ==
Following track listing
No.	Title	Lyrics	Music	Arrangement	Length
1.	"Party (Follow Me)" (featuring Wooseok of Pentagon)	Big Sancho; Hyuna; Wooseok	Big Sancho; Hyuna	Big Sancho	3:09
2.	"Babe" (베베)	Shinsadong Tiger; Beom x Nang; Hyuna	Shinsadong Tiger; Beom x Nang	Shinsadong Tiger	3:13
3.	"Purple" (보라색; Bolasaeg (with E'Dawn of Pentagon))	E'Dawn; Hyuna	E'Dawn	Big Sancho	3:42
4.	"Dart"	Son Youngjin; Kang Dongha; Hyuna	Youngjin	Youngjin	3:13
5.	"Mirror" (자화상; Jahwasang)	January 8; Hyuna	Ruby Spiro; Andreas Wallevik; Espen Andersen; Peter Wallevik	A. Wallevik; Andersen; P. Wallevik	3:07
Total length:					16:24

== Charts ==
=== Weekly charts ===
Weekly chart performance for Following
Chart (2017)	Peak position
South Korean Albums (Gaon)	9
US World Albums (Billboard)	5

=== Monthly charts ===
Monthly chart performance for Following
Chart (2017)	Peak position
South Korean Albums (Gaon)	28

== Release history ==
Release history and formats for Following
Region	Date	Format	Label	Ref.
South Korea	August 29, 2017	CD, Digital download	Cube Entertainment, LOEN Entertainment	
Various	August 29, 2017	Digital download	Cube Entertainment, LOEN Entertainment	
