= 1+1=1 =

EP by Hyuna & Dawn
- Released: September 9, 2021
- Genres: K-pop; dance-pop; R&B
- Length: 11:16
- Languages: Korean; English
- Labels: P Nation; Kakao
- Producer: Park Jae-sang (exec.)

Hyuna chronology
I'm Not Cool (2021)	1+1=1 (2021)	Nabillera (2022)

Dawn chronology
Dawndididawn (2020)	1+1=1 (2021)

Singles from 1+1=1
- 1. "Ping Pong" Released: September 9, 2021

1+1=1 is a collaborative extended play (EP) by South Korean singer-songwriter Hyuna and South Korean rapper Dawn. The EP was released on September 9, 2021, through P Nation and distributed by Kakao Entertainment. The EP consists of four tracks, including the title track "Ping Pong".

== Background ==
On August 30, P Nation confirmed that Hyuna and Dawn would release a duet EP. The next day, P Nation unveiled the tracklisting to the EP on their official social media accounts, revealing "Ping Pong" as the lead single.

== Release ==
The EP was released on September 9 through many Korean online music services, including Melon. For the global market, the EP was made available on iTunes and Spotify. It was also released in physical format.

== Music video ==
On September 6, a teaser for the music video of "Ping Pong" was released. On September 9, the official music video of "Ping Pong" was released.

== Track listing ==
Credits adapted from track listing and Melon.

1+1=1 track listing
No.	Title	Lyrics	Music	Arrangement	Length
1.	"Deep Dive"	Dawn	Dawn; Philip Kwon	Philip Kwon	1:53
2.	"Ping Pong"	Dawn; Hyuna	Dawn; Hyuna; Yoo Geon-hyeong; Philip Kwon; Space One	Yoo Geon-hyeong; Space One; Philip Kwon	2:38
3.	"XOXO"	Dawn; Hyuna	Hyuna; Philip Kwon; Dawn	Philip Kwon	3:16
4.	"I Know" (우린 분명 죽을 만큼 사랑했다)	Hyuna; Dawn	Dawn; Yoo Geon-hyeong; Philip Kwon; Pilseong Kang	Yoo Geon-hyeong; Pilseong Kang; Philip Kwon	3:27
Total length:					11:16

== Charts ==
Chart performance for 1+1=1
Chart (2021)	Peak position
South Korean Albums (Gaon)	13

== Release history ==
Release dates and formats for 1+1=1
Region	Date	Format	Label	Ref.
Various	September 9, 2021	CD; digital download; streaming	P Nation; Kakao Entertainment	
