= Babe (Hyuna song) =

Single by Hyuna

from the EP Following
- Released: August 29, 2017
- Genre: K-pop; EDM
- Length: 3:13
- Label: Cube; LOEN
- Songwriter(s): Hyuna; Shinsadong Tiger; Beom x Nang
- Producer(s): Shinsadong Tiger; Beom x Nang

Hyuna singles chronology
"How's This?" (2016)	"Babe" (2017)	"Lip & Hip" (2017)

Music video
- "Babe" on YouTube

"Babe" (Korean: 베베; RR: bebe; stylized in all caps) is a song recorded by South Korean singer-songwriter and rapper Hyuna, and is the lead single of her sixth extended play, Following (2017). It was written by Hyuna, Shinsadong Tiger and Beom X Nang, and produced by the latter two. The singer performed the song in several South Korean music programs, including Music Bank and Inkigayo.

Commercially, "Babe" debuted at number 16 on the Gaon Digital Chart and rose three positions to number 13 where it peaked the following week. It was nominated for Best Dance Performance – Solo at the 2017 Mnet Asian Music Awards.

== Composition ==
"Babe" was written by Hyuna, Shinsadong Tiger and Beom X Nang and was produced by the latter two. At the surface-level, the song appears to be written about a relationship, but it draws parallels to her experiences in the music industry with the hook revolving around needing approval, changing against her will, and being infantilized. The lyrics where she counts her age backwards shows Hyuna getting progressively younger and younger, seemingly referencing the expectation that she needs to continue to act and appear young as she grows older.

== Commercial performance ==
Following the song's release, Hyuna trending on several domestic real-time search engines. It debuted at number 16 on the Gaon Digital Chart, on the chart issue dated August 27 – September 2, 2017, with 65,334 downloads sold and 1,356,010 streams. It also debuted at number 3 on the Gaon Social Chart on the same week. On the issue between September 3 and 9, 2017, the song peaked at number 13. The song placed at number 17 on the chart for the month of September 2017, as a hot track, with 193,586 downloads sold. It also debuted at number 43 on Billboard Korea's K-pop Hot 100. In its second week, the song rose to number 17 and peaked at number 13 a week later.

== Music video and promotion ==
A music video teaser was released on August 27, 2017, through Hyuna's official YouTube channel. The music video was officially released two days later and garnered 1 million views in a day. The 1990s-inspired video has the singer dancing in different scenarios, one of them being outer space.

The singer started live performances on MBC Music's Show Champion on August 30 and continued on Mnet's M Countdown on August 31, KBS' Music Bank on September 1, MBC's Show! Music Core on September 2 and SBS' Inkigayo on September 3.

== Charts ==
Chart (2017)	Peak position
South Korea (Gaon)	13
South Korea (K-pop Hot 100)	13
US World Digital Song Sales (Billboard)	10
