= Nabillera =

- Digital cover

EP by Hyuna
- Released: July 20, 2022
- Genre: K-pop
- Length: 15:15
- Language: Korean
- Labels: P Nation; Kakao

Hyuna chronology
1+1=1 (2021)	Nabillera (2022)	Attitude (2024)

Singles from Nabillera
- 1. "Nabillera" Released: July 20, 2022

Nabillera (Korean: 나빌레라; RR: Nabillera) is the eighth extended play (EP) by South Korean singer-songwriter and rapper Hyuna. It was released on July 20, 2022, through P Nation and distributed by Kakao Entertainment. The EP consists of five tracks, including the title track of the same name. The EP serves as Hyuna's last solo release under P Nation following her departure from the company in August 2022.

== Background and release ==
On July 12, P Nation confirmed that Hyuna would release a new album after a year and six months since her latest release. The following day, the first promotional poster was revealed, following by track listing on the next day, confirming "Nabillera" as the lead single. On July 14 and 18, a choreography preview in a "short-form" video was released. A music video teaser video for the lead single was uploaded on July 19. The music video was released on July 20, alongside the EP, its released through many Korean online music services, including Melon. For the global market, the EP was made available on iTunes and Spotify. It was also released in physical format.

== Composition ==
The EP consists of five tracks, including the title track. The album includes "Bad Dog", "Picasso & Fernande Olivier", "Dinga Dinga" (띵가띵가'), and "Watch Me". The title track "Nabillera was written by Hyuna, Psy, and Dawn, and is described as a "Latin-style" song with a light and minimal beat and tropical rhythm. Its lyrics express a desire to become a butterfly, hoping to leave a mark in someone's memory. The song's title – written in Korean as 나빌레라 – its a native Korean phrase from an old poem named "The Nun's Dance", which roughly translates to "like a butterfly" in English.

Dawn participated in writing and composing track two, "Bad Dog". It was described as a rock song led by an "intense guitar sound" with lyrics about an ex-lover. Hyuna recorded two of her self-composed songs, including the third track "Picasso & Fernande Olivier" and fifth track "Watch Me". "Picasso & Fernande Olivier" was described as an "attractive" hip hop song with an 808 bass beat that Hyuna participated in writing and composing. The lyrics express Hyuna's desire for her lover to be by her side like Pablo Picasso and his muse, Fernande Olivier.

Track 4 "Dinga Dinga" (띵가띵가') is a song written and produced by Sunwoo Jung-a, who previously worked with Hyuna on her fifth EP A'wesome. It is a pop song with a "West Coast vibe". The lyrics are about "expressing her attitude to focus on the things she likes". "Watch Me", another song Hyuna participated in composing, was described an "emotional" soft pop song with lyrics as if Hyuna is "telling a story to her friends".

== Promotion ==
On July 18, a teaser for the music video of "Nabillera" was released. Two days later, the official music video of "Nabillera" was released. On July 20, Hyuna held an online media showcase to commemorate the release of her album 'Nabillera' through the official YouTube channel and unveiled the stage for the title song 'Nabillera' for the first time. Hyuna performed the song for the first time on M Countdown on July 22, followed with her performances on Music Bank, Inkigayo, and Show! Music Core. The album’s promo lasted only one week after her departure from the company.

== Accolades ==
Award and nominations for "I'm Not Cool"
Year	Organization	Award	Result	Ref.
2022	Asian Pop Music Awards	Album of the Year (Overseas)	Nominated	
2022	Asian Pop Music Awards	Top 20 Albums of the Year (Overseas)	Won	
2022	Asian Pop Music Awards	Best Female Artist	Nominated	

== Track listing ==
Nabillera track listing
No.	Title	Lyrics	Music	Arrangement	Length
1.	"Nabillera" (나빌레라)	Hyuna; Psy; Dawn	Daniel Caesar; Johanna Söderberg; Jerker Hansson	Caesar	2:48
2.	"Bad Dog"	Hyuna; Dawn; Ann	Dawn; Ann; Philip Kwon	Kwon	2:41
3.	"Picasso & Fernande Olivier"	Hyuna	Hyuna; Kwon	Kwon	2:36
4.	"Dinga Dinga" (띵가띵가)	Hyuna; Sunwoo Jung-a; Realmeee	Sunwoo; Realmeee	Sunwoo; Baek Kyung-jin; Realmeee	3:40
5.	"Watch Me"	Hyuna	Hyuna; Kwon	Kwon	3:30
Total length:					15:15

== Charts ==
=== Weekly charts ===
Chart performance for Nabillera
Chart (2022)	Peak position
South Korean Albums (Circle)	14

=== Monthly charts ===
Monthly chart performance for Nabillera
Chart (July 2022)	Peak position
South Korean Albums (Circle)	49

== Release history ==
Release dates and formats for Nabillera
Region	Date	Format	Label	Ref.
Various	July 20, 2022	CD; digital download; streaming	P Nation; Kakao Entertainment	
