= I'm Not Cool (song) =

Single by Hyuna

from the EP I'm Not Cool
- Language: Korean; English
- Released: January 28, 2021
- Genre: Electropop; trap
- Length: 2:54
- Label: P Nation
- Composers: Yoo Geon-hyeong; Space One; Slyme Young
- Lyricists: Hyuna; Psy; Dawn

Hyuna singles chronology
| "Flower Shower" (2019) | "I'm Not Cool" (2021) | "Ping Pong" (2021) |

Music video
- "I'm Not Cool" on YouTube

"I'm Not Cool" is a song recorded by South Korean singer-songwriter Hyuna, released on January 28, 2021, under P Nation, simultaneously with the accompanied music video and her seventh EP by the same name, the latter is which the song is from.

== Composition ==
The song was written by Psy, Hyuna and Dawn. The song is composed in the key E-flat minor and has 116 beats per minute and a running time of 2 minutes and 54 seconds.

== Commercial performance ==
"I'm Not Cool" debuted at number 73 on the South Korean Gaon Digital Chart and the next week the song peaked at number 9, making it Hyuna's first Top 10 entry since her 2016 song How's This?, which peaked at number 5. In the US, the song debuted at number 19 on the Billboard World Digital Song Sales and the next week the song peaked at number 8.

== Music video and promotion ==
On January 26, a first teaser for the music video of "I'm Not Cool" was released. On the next day, the second teaser was released. On January 28, the official music video was released. On January 28, Hyuna held her first comeback stage for the song on Mnet's M Countdown. The next day, Hyuna performed the song on KBS2's Music Bank and You Hee-yeol's Sketchbook. On January 30, Hyuna performed the song on MBC's Show! Music Core and on SBS's Inkigayo the following day.

== Accolades ==
Award and nominations for "I'm Not Cool"
| Year | Organization | Award | Result | Ref. |
|---|---|---|---|---|
| 2021 | Mnet Asian Music Awards | Best Dance Performance – Solo | Nominated | |
| 2021 | Mnet Asian Music Awards | Song of the Year | Longlisted | |
| 2021 | Asian Pop Music Awards | Song of the Year | Nominated | |
| 2021 | Asian Pop Music Awards | Best Dance Performance | Nominated | |
| 2021 | Asian Pop Music Awards | People's Choice Award (Overseas) | Won | |
| 2021 | Asian Pop Music Awards | Top 20 Songs of the Year (Overseas) | Won | |
| 2022 | Gaon Chart Music Awards | Song of the Year – January | Nominated | |
| 2022 | Golden Disc Awards | Digital Song Bonsang | Nominated | |
| 2022 | Seoul Music Awards | R&B Hiphop Award | Won | |

== Credits and personnel ==
Credits adapted from Melon.

- Hyuna – vocals, songwriting, composing, chorus
- Psy – songwriting, composing
- Dawn – songwriting
- Yoo Geon-hyeong – producer
- Space One – producer
- Slyme Young – producer

== Charts ==
Chart performance for "I'm Not Cool"
| Chart (2021) | Peak position |
|---|---|
| Billboard Global Excl. U.S. | 165 |
| New Zealand Hot Singles (RMNZ) | 25 |
| Singapore (RIAS) | 14 |
| South Korea (Gaon) | 9 |
| South Korea (Kpop Hot 100) | 11 |
| US World Digital Songs (Billboard) | 8 |

=== Year-end Chart ===
| Chart (2021) | Peak position |
|---|---|
| South Korea (Gaon) | 121 |

== Release history ==
Release history for "I'm Not Cool"
| Region | Date | Format | Label |
|---|---|---|---|
| Various | January 28, 2021 | Digital download; streaming | P Nation |
