= Triple H (band) =

South Korean musical trio

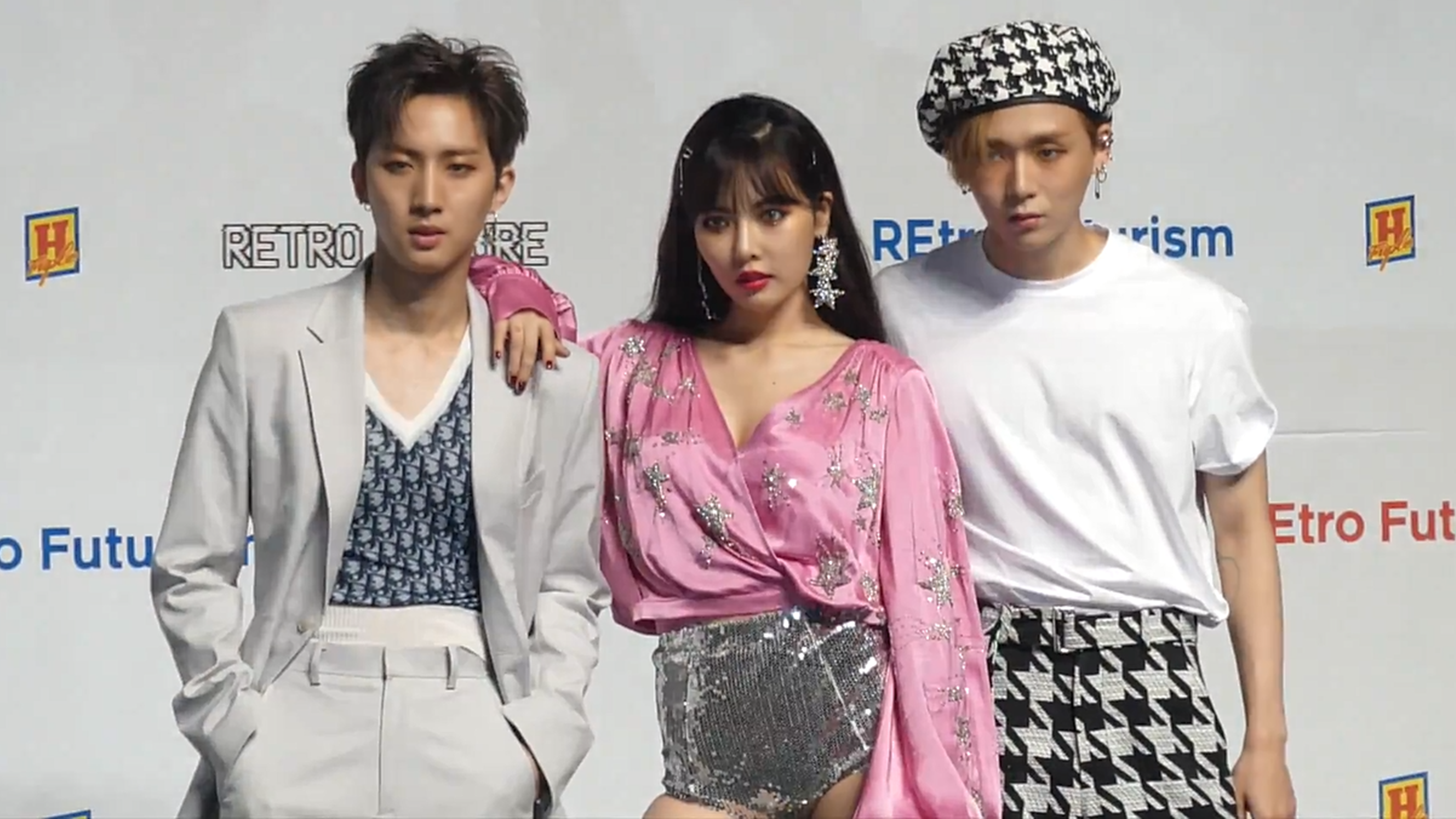
- Triple H in July 2018

Background information
- Origin: Seoul, South Korea
- Genres: K-pop; dance-pop; hip-hop
- Years active: 2017–2018
- Label: Cube
- Past members: Hyuna; Hui; E'Dawn
- Website: cubeent.co.kr/tripleh

Triple H (Korean: 트리플 H) was a South Korean musical group formed by Cube Entertainment. The group consisted of former 4minute member Hyuna and Pentagon members Hui and E'Dawn. As a group, Triple H released two extended plays, 199X (2017) and Retro Futurism (2018).

In 2018, Cube confirmed the end of the group after Hyuna and E'Dawn were dismissed from the agency following an unapproved press release confirming they were in a relationship.

== Career ==
=== 2017: Debut with 199X ===
In March 2017, Cube Entertainment announced that Hyuna had formed a project group with unnamed label mates, that was set to debut in May. On April 4, Cube Entertainment announced that Hui and E'Dawn from the boyband Pentagon were the other members of the group, which would be called Triple H, and that they would star in a reality show called Triple H Fun Agency.

On May 1, Triple H released their first extended play, 199X, along with the single "365 Fresh" and its music video. The EP reached #4 on the Gaon Album Chart and #10 on the Billboard World Albums Chart. The music video for "365 Fresh" was the subject of controversy due to its depictions of sex, suicide, and crime.

=== 2018: Retro Futurism and departures ===
In June 2018, Cube Entertainment announced that Triple H would be making a comeback in July. On July 18, Triple H released their second extended play, Retro Futurism, accompanied by a music video for the single, "Retro Future". The EP reached #8 on the Gaon Album Chart.

On August 2, 2018, Hyuna revealed that she had been dating E'Dawn since May 2016. On September 13, Cube Entertainment announced that they would be terminating their contracts, citing that they could not "maintain trust" with them. However, Cube announced that they would still remain in discussion with both of them until further notice. On October 5, a related source reported Hyuna and E'Dawn confirmed their departures from Cube Entertainment. On October 15, Cube Entertainment officially confirmed Hyuna's departure. On November 14, Cube Entertainment officially confirmed E'Dawn's departure.

== Discography ==
=== Extended plays ===
List of extended plays, with selected details, chart positions, and sales
Title	Details	Peak chart positions		Sales
Title	Details	KOR	US World	Sales
199X	Released: May 1, 2017; Label: Cube Entertainment; Formats: CD, digital download	4	10	KOR: 5,157
Retro Futurism	Released: July 18, 2018; Label: Cube Entertainment; Formats: CD, digital download	8	—	KOR: 11,605
"—" denotes releases that did not chart or were not released in that region.

=== Singles ===
Title	Year	Peak chart positions		Sales	Album
Title	Year	KOR	US World	Sales	Album
"365 Fresh"	2017	81	7	KOR: 44,260	199X
"Retro Future"	2018	— (Note: "Retro Future" did not enter the Gaon Digital Chart but charted at #39 on the Gaon Download Chart.)	16	—N/a	Retro Futurism
"—" denotes releases that did not chart or were not released in that region.
