= How's This? =

2016 single by Hyuna

Single by Hyuna

from the EP A'wesome
- Released: August 1, 2016
- Recorded: 2016
- Genre: Hip-hop; trap
- Length: 3:19
- Label: Cube
- Composer: Seo Jae-woo
- Lyricists: Hyuna; Seo Jae-woo; Big Sancho

Hyuna singles chronology
"Roll Deep" (2015)	"How's This?" (2016)	"Babe" (2017)

Music video
- "How’s This" on YouTube

"How's This?" (Korean: 어때?; RR: eottae?) is a song recorded by South Korean singer-songwriter and rapper Hyuna. It is the lead single of her fifth extended play, A'wesome, released on August 1, 2016. It was written by Hyuna, Big Sancho and Seo Jaewoo. The singer performed the song on several South Korean music programs, including M Countdown and Inkigayo, where she also won a music show award on each.

The song peaked at number 5 on the Gaon Digital Chart and at number 4 on the US World Digital Chart.

== Background and release ==
"How's This?" was written by Hyuna, Big Sancho and Seo Jae-woo and produced by Jae-woo.

== Composition ==
"How's This?" is a hip-hop and trap song that incorporates saxophone riff, West Coast hip hop–inspired beat, a dark, lo-fi breakdown at the outro, and "sassy" talk-rap style. Its lyrics "express Hyuna's sexy charm." Jeff Benjamin writing for Fuse's "[it is] a typical club banger" that "moves through different genres and vocal deliveries over a pounding beat".

== Music video ==
A music video for "How's This?" was released on August 1, and was directed by Hong Won-ki of Zanybros. The video is set in a club party, which featured one-hundred dancers. "How's This?" topped multiple real-time music charts upon its release, and the accompanying music video reached more than 2 million views within 24 hours.

== Accolades ==
Awards
Year	Organization	Award	Result	Ref.
2016	Mnet Asian Music Awards	Best Dance Performance - Solo	Nominated	
2016	Mnet Asian Music Awards	UnionPay Song of the Year	Nominated	
2016	Mnet Asian Music Awards	UnionPay Artist of the Year	Nominated	

Music programs awards
Program	Date	Ref.
M! Countdown	August 11, 2016	
Inkigayo	August 14, 2016	

== Charts ==
The song debuted at number 5 on the Gaon Digital Chart, on the chart issue dated July 31 - August 6, 2016, with 102,587 downloads sold and 2,201,140 streams. The song also debuted at number 16 on the chart for the month of August 2016, with 190,625 downloads sold and 7,372,262 streams accumulated.

Chart (2016)	Peak position
South Korea (Gaon)	5
Chinese Music Charts	1
US World Digital Chart	4
