= Nabillera (song) =

2022 single by Hyuna

Single by Hyuna

from the EP Nabillera
- Language: Korean; English
- Released: July 20, 2022
- Genre: K-pop; dance-pop
- Length: 2:48
- Label: P Nation
- Composers: Daniel Caesar; Johanna Söderberg; Jerker Hansson
- Lyricists: Hyuna; Psy; Dawn

Hyuna singles chronology
"Ping Pong" (2021)	"Nabillera" (2022)	"Q&A" (2024)

Music video
- "Nabillera" on YouTube

"Nabillera" (Korean: 나빌레라; RR: Nabillera) is a song recorded by South Korean singer-songwriter and rapper Hyuna, released on July 20, 2022, under P Nation. It is the title track from the EP of the same name, and was released simultaneously with an accompanying music video. The song serves as Hyuna's last solo release under P Nation following her departure from the company in August 2022.

== Composition ==
The song was written by Hyuna, Psy, and Dawn. "Nabillera" was described as a "Latin-style" song with a light and minimal beat and tropical rhythm. Its lyrics express a desire to become a butterfly, hoping to leave a mark in someone's memory. The song's title – written in Korean as 나빌레라 – its a native Korean phrase from an old poem named "The Nun's Dance", which roughly translates to "like a butterfly" in English.

== Accolades ==
Award and nominations for "Nabillera"
Year	Organization	Award	Result	Ref.
2022	Asian Pop Music Awards	People's Choice Award (Overseas)	Won	
2022	Asian Pop Music Awards	Top 20 Songs of the Year (Overseas)	Won	
2022	Asian Pop Music Awards	Song of the Year (Overseas)	Nominated	
2022	Asian Pop Music Awards	Best Dance Performance (Overseas)	Nominated	

== Music video ==
On July 18, a teaser for the music video of "Nabillera" was released. On July 20, the official music video of "Nabillera" was released.

== Promotion ==
On July 20, Hyuna held an online media showcase to commemorate the release of her album 'Nabillera' through the official YouTube channel and unveiled the stage for the title song 'Nabillera' for the first time. On July 21, Hyuna performed the song for the first time on Mnet's M Countdown. followed with her performances on KBS's Music Bank on July 22, MBC's Show! Music Core on July 23, and SBS's inkigayo on July 24. As of 2024, the singer only performed the song for the album’s promotions back in 2022.

== Credits and personnel ==
Credits adapted from Melon.

- Hyuna – vocals, songwriting, composing, chorus
- Psy – songwriting
- Dawn – songwriting
- Daniel Caesar – composer, arrangement
- Johanna Söderberg – composer
- Jerker Hansson – composer

== Charts ==
Chart performance for "Nabillera"
Chart (2022)	Peak position
South Korea (Circle)	147

== Release history ==
Release history for "Nabillera"
Region	Date	Format	Label
Various	July 20, 2022	Digital download; streaming	P Nation
