= A'wesome =

EP by Hyuna
- Released: August 1, 2016
- Genre: K-pop; dance-pop; R&B; hip hop
- Length: 24:47
- Label: Cube; Universal Music
- Producer: Seo Jaewoo; Son Youngjin; Big Sancho; Brian Lee

Hyuna chronology
A+ (2015)	A'wesome (2016)	Following (2017)

Singles from A'wesome
- 1. "How's This?" Released: August 1, 2016; 2. "Morning Glory" Released: August 22, 2016

Music video
- "How's This?" on YouTube

A'wesome is the fifth extended play (EP) by South Korean singer Hyuna. It was released on August 1, 2016, by Cube Entertainment and distributed by Universal Music. It marks her first release as a solo artist since the disbandment of girl group 4Minute. The EP consists of six Korean-language songs. "How's This?" was released as the lead single.

== Background ==
Girl group 4Minute, of which Hyuna was part of, disbanded in June 2016. Four of the members, Jihyun, Gayoon, Jiyoon, and Sohyun, parted ways with Cube Entertainment after their contract termination. Hyuna was the only member to renew her contract with the agency, and would continue her career as a solo artist.

== Release and promotion ==
Later in July, Cube confirmed that Hyuna will be returning as a solo artist on August 1 with the release of her 5th mini album A'wesome. On July 25, Hyuna dropped the first teaser images that were taken in Bali, Indonesia. It was also revealed that Hyuna will be promoting with the title track "How's This?". On July 28, Hyuna launched her official YouTube channel, and uploaded a highlight medley of her upcoming EP.

On August 1, the EP was released as a digital download on different music portals. A music video for "How's This?" was also released on the same day. It was directed by Hong Won-ki of Zanybros, and was set on a club party that featured a hundred dancers. "How's This?" topped multiple real-time music charts upon its release, and the accompanying music video reached more than 2 million views within 24 hours.

Hyuna made her first music show performance on Music Bank on August 5. She performed the singles How's This?, U&ME and Freaky different times. The track "Do It" was deemed unfit for broadcast by KBS because the lyrics contain a vulgar expression.

On August 22, 2016, a video for the song "Morning Glory" was released on Hyuna's YouTube channel, featuring behind the scenes clips of the album's creation.

== Composition ==
The album tracks ranges from hip-hop to indie music genres. The title track of the album, "How's This?", is a trap and hip-hop song played in saxophone riff and 808 bass sound. It is produced by Seo Jaewoo, who also produced her previous works like "Red" and "Roll Deep". "Wolf" is an emotional hip-hop track that features rapper Hanhae. "U&Me" is described as a light song in an easy beat. "Morning Glory" is an indie-style song produced by singer-songwriter Seonwoo Jeong-a, and features indie musician, Qim Aisle. "Flirt" is a trap beat track. "Do it!" is produced by Seo Jaewoo, Big Sancho and American songwriter, Brian Lee. EXID's LE and BTOB's Jung Il-hoon also participated in the chorus and rap verse.

== Commercial performance ==
A'wesome entered and peaked at number 2 on the Gaon Album Chart on the chart issue dated July 31 – August 6, 2016. In its second week, the EP charted at number 33 before leaving the chart the following week.

The mini-album entered at number 12 on the Gaon Album Chart for the month of August 2016 with 9,224 physical copies sold.

The lead single "How's This?" entered at number 5 on the Gaon Digital Chart on the chart issue dated July 31- August 6, 2016 with 102,587 downloads sold and 2,201,140 streams.

== Track listing ==
No.	Title	Lyrics	Music	Arrangement	Length
1.	"U & Me♡"	Seo Jaewoo; Son Youngjin; Hyuna	Seo Jaewoo; Son Youngjin	Seo Jaewoo; Son Youngjin	3:27
2.	"How's This?" (어때?)	Hyuna; Seo Jaewoo; Big Sancho	Seo Jaewoo	Seo Jaewoo	3:19
3.	"Do it!"	Seo Jaewoo; Big Sancho; Brian Lee; Hyuna	Seo Jaewoo; Big Sancho; Brian Lee	Seo Jaewoo; Big Sancho; Brian Lee	3:19
4.	"Morning Glory" (featuring Qim Isle)	Seonwoo Jeonga	Seonwoo Jeonga	Seonwoo Jeonga	3:31
5.	"Freaky" (꼬리쳐)	Big Sancho; Hyuna	Big Sancho	Seo Jaewoo; Big Sancho	3:17
6.	"Wolf" (featuring Hanhae of Phantom)	Hyuna; Hanhae	Seo Jaewoo; Son Youngjin	Seo Jaewoo; Son Youngjin	3:54
Total length:					24:47

== Charts ==
=== Weekly charts ===
Chart (2016)	Peak position
South Korea (Gaon Album Chart)	2

=== Monthly charts ===
Chart (2016)	Peak position
South Korea (Gaon Album Chart)	12

== Awards and nominations ==
=== Music program awards ===
Song	Program	Date
"How's This?"	M! Countdown (Mnet)	August 11, 2016
"How's This?"	Inkigayo (SBS)	August 14, 2016
