= Flower Shower =

2019 single by Hyuna

Single by Hyuna

from the EP I'm Not Cool
- Language: Korean; English
- Released: November 5, 2019
- Recorded: 2019
- Genre: K-pop; dance
- Length: 3:08
- Label: P Nation; Kakao M
- Composers: Psy; Hyuna; Yu Geon-hyeong; Space One; Anna Timgren
- Lyricists: Psy; Hyuna

Hyuna singles chronology
"Lip & Hip" (2017)	"Flower Shower" (2019)	"I'm Not Cool" (2021)

Music video
- "Flower Shower" on YouTube

"Flower Shower" (stylized in all caps) is a song recorded by South Korean singer-songwriter Hyuna, released on November 5, 2019, by P Nation and distributed by Kakao M as a single. The music video was released on the same day. "Flower Shower" was Hyuna’s first release with P Nation after her departure from her former agency Cube Entertainment. The song was later included in Hyuna's seventh EP I'm Not Cool.

== Composition ==
The song was written and produced by Psy. It was mainly composed in C major, apart from the chorus, and it is in a tempo of 100 bpm.

== Promotion ==
Hyuna promoted the song on several music programs in South Korea including M Countdown, Show! Music Core and Inkigayo.

== Chart performance ==
"Flower Shower" debuted at number 71 on the South Korean Gaon Digital Chart and the next week the song peaked at number 54. In the US, the song also debuted at number 6 on the Billboard World Digital Song Sales with 1,000 downloads sold.

== Music video ==
The music video teaser was released on November 4. The official music video was released on November 5. The dance practice was released on November 8.

== Credits and personnel ==
- Hyuna – vocals, songwriting, producer
- Psy – songwriting, producer
- Yu Geon-hyeong – producer
- Space One – producer
- Anna Timgren – producer

== Charts ==
=== Weekly charts ===
Chart (2019)	Peak position
South Korea (Gaon)	54
South Korea (Kpop Hot 100)	31
US World Digital Songs (Billboard)	6

== Release history ==
Region	Date	Format	Label
Various	November 5, 2019	Digital download; streaming	P Nation; Kakao M
