= Lip & Hip =

2017 single by Hyuna

Single by Hyuna
- Released: December 4, 2017
- Genre: K-pop; EDM
- Length: 3:29
- Label: Cube
- Songwriter(s): Hyuna; Big Sancho; Son Young-jin (MosPick); Scott
- Producer(s): Big Sancho; Son Young-jin

Hyuna singles chronology
| "Babe" (2017) | "Lip & Hip" (2017) | "Flower Shower" (2019) |

Music video
- "Lip & Hip" on YouTube

"Lip & Hip" is a song by South Korean singer-songwriter and rapper Hyuna. It was released through digital platforms under Cube Entertainment on December 4, 2017, while the CD single was made available the following day. The single serves as Hyuna's last solo release under Cube Entertainment following her departure from the company in October 2018.

== Background and release ==
On November 21, Cube revealed that the singer would be releasing a new song on December 4, adding that music programs appearances were still in discussion. On November 27, the rapper revealed through a V Live that the song was a “thanks” to her fans on her 10th anniversary since debut. She also revealed that the music style and fashion would be different from her last song "Babe", released a few months prior. A few days later, promotional pictures were released, captioning the song as a "ThanX Single".

On November 29, it was reported that the singer will be attending the 2017 Melon Music Awards and that she will be performing the song, two days prior to the official release. The single was released through several music portals on December 4, 2017, including MelOn in South Korea and iTunes worldwide.

== Music video and promotion ==
A music video teaser was released on December 1. The official music video was released in conjunction the song on December 4. It was described by Billboard as "one of the most suggestive clips out of K-pop in some time, as the soloist takes ownership of female passion through a subtle coming-of-age narrative". The music video was directed by Lumpens.

Hyuna premiered the song at the 2017 Melon Music Awards on December 2, 2017, two days prior to the official release. Music shows promotions started on KBS' Music Bank on December 8. It continued on MBC's Show! Music Core on December 9 and SBS' Inkigayo on December 10.

== Commercial performance ==
The physical copy of the single debuted and peaked at number 14 on the Gaon Album Chart. It placed at number 44 for the month of December 2017, with 3,000 copies sold. "Lip & Hip" debuted and peaked at number 16 on the Gaon Digital Chart, on the chart issue dated December 3–9, 2017, with 61,108 downloads sold and 1,483,409 streams. In its second week, the song fell to number 42 with 32,821 downloads sold and 1,435,211 streams. It also debuted and peaked at number 35 on Billboard Korea's Kpop Hot 100. In its second week, the song fell to number 36. The song placed at number 44 for the month of December 2017.

== Usage in media ==
The song has been played in the hit American TV show, The Bold Type, during its seventh episode of the second season.

== Track listing ==
CD single

1. Lip & Hip – 3:29
2. Lip & Hip (Instrumental) – 3:29

== Charts and sales ==
=== Weekly charts ===
| Chart (2017) | Peak position |
|---|---|
| South Korean Singles (Gaon) | 16 |
| South Korean Albums (Gaon) | 14 |
| South Korea (K-pop Hot 100) | 36 |
| US World Digital Songs (Billboard) | 5 |

=== Sales ===
| Country | Sales (2017) |
|---|---|
| South Korea (digital single) | 361,855 |
| South Korea (physical) | 3,000 |

== Release history ==
| Region | Date | Format | Distributor |
|---|---|---|---|
| Various | December 4, 2017 | Digital download | Cube Entertainment; LOEN Entertainment |
| South Korea | December 4, 2017 | Digital download | Cube Entertainment; LOEN Entertainment |
| South Korea | December 5, 2017 | CD | Cube Entertainment; LOEN Entertainment |
