= Hyuna =

South Korean singer (born 1992)

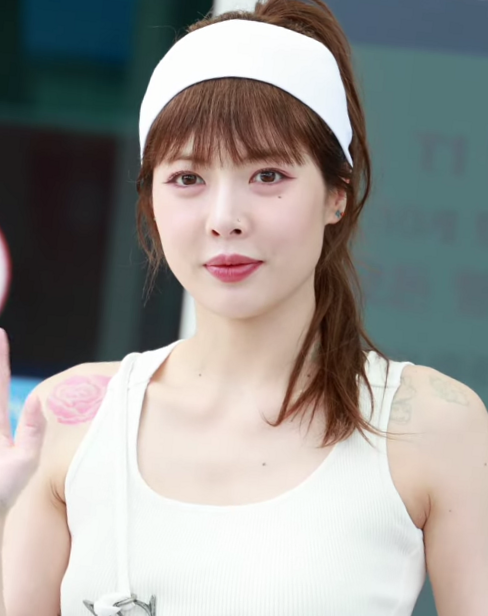
- Hyuna in July 2023
- Born: Kim Hyun-ah; June 6, 1992 (age 34); Seoul, South Korea
- Education: Konkuk University
- Occupations: Singer-songwriter; rapper; model
- Spouse: Yong Jun-hyung (m. 2024)
- Awards: Full list
- Musical career
- Genre: K-pop
- Instrument: Vocals
- Years active: 2006–present
- Labels: JYP; Cube; P Nation; At Area
- Formerly of: Wonder Girls; 4Minute; Trouble Maker; Triple H; JYP Nation; United Cube

Korean name
- Hangul: 김현아
- Hanja: 金泫雅
- RR: Gim Hyeona
- MR: Kim Hyŏna

Signature
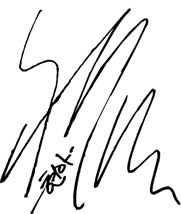

Kim Hyun-ah (Korean: 김현아; born June 6, 1992), known professionally as Hyuna (stylized as HyunA), is a South Korean singer-songwriter, rapper and model. She debuted as a member of the girl group Wonder Girls in February 2007. Upon leaving the ensemble shortly after, Hyuna subsequently left JYP Entertainment and joined the girl group 4Minute. The group debuted in June 2009 under Cube Entertainment. In 2010, Hyuna began a solo career with a style she described as "performance-oriented music". Her solo debut single "Change" charted at number-two on South Korea's Gaon Digital Chart.

In 2011, Hyuna gained wider public recognition with the release of her first extended play Bubble Pop!. The title track sold more than three million digital copies and she became the first female K-pop solo artist to reach 100 million views on a single music video on YouTube. Later the same year, she formed the duo Trouble Maker with former Beast member Hyunseung, releasing the hit single "Trouble Maker". In 2012, she appeared in a successful duet rendition of Psy's worldwide hit "Gangnam Style" and later released her second extended play Melting, which featured the number-one single "Ice Cream". Her next two extended plays A Talk and A+ yielded the successful singles "Red" and "Roll Deep", respectively. Following 4Minute's disbandment in mid-2016, she released her fifth extended play A'wesome, which was supported by her first concert tour The Queen's Back. In 2017, she was involved in the trio Triple H with Pentagon members Hui and E'Dawn before releasing her sixth extended play Following.

In 2018, Hyuna ended her contract with Cube Entertainment after several internal conflicts, and signed with Psy's P Nation the following year. Her first digital single under P Nation "Flower Shower" became her seventh top-ten entry on the US Billboard World Digital Song Sales. In 2021, Hyuna released her seventh extended play I'm Not Cool.

== Life and career ==
=== 1992–2009: Early life and career beginnings ===
Hyuna was born on June 6, 1992 in Seodaemun District, Seoul, South Korea. She attended Choongam Middle School and Korea High School of Music and Arts. Hyuna graduated from Konkuk University, in Contemporary Arts, for which she had received special admission.

In 2006, she was revealed as a member of the JYP Entertainment managed girl group Wonder Girls as the group's main rapper. Hyuna participated in the group's debut mini album The Wonder Begins, released in February 2007. She participated in the group's television show MTV Wonder Girls for two seasons, and co-hosted Show! Music Core with Wonder Girls' Sohee and Fly to the Sky singer Brian Joo from May 12 – June 30, 2007. Hyuna left Wonder Girls in July, when she was removed by her parents due to their concern over her health, particularly chronic gastroenteritis and fainting spells. In 2008, she joined Cube Entertainment. In May 2009, it was announced that Hyuna would debut as part of the girl group 4Minute. The group debuted with the single "Hot Issue" on June 15.

=== 2009–2010: Solo debut and rising success ===
Hyuna collaborated with Lee Gi-kwang on the song "2009" for his debut album First Episode: A New Hero, and also appeared in the music video of his single "Dancing Shoes," which was released on March 30, 2009. On August 13, she rapped for Navi's song "Wasteful Tears" and she also appeared in the music video. Hyuna also featured in Brave Brothers' song "Bittersweet," released August 18. She became part of the "Dream Team Girl Group," a promotional group for Samsung's Anycall phone with Han Seung-yeon, Uee, and Gain. Their first digital single "Tomorrow" was released on October 6, 2009, and the official music video was released on October 12, starring actor Lee Dong-gun. As well, Hyuna released an individual version of the music video which released on October 27. She also participated in the South Korean variety show Invincible Youth. However, Hyuna left the show due to some scheduling conflicts with her group's overseas promotions on June 11, 2010.

On January 4, 2010, she released the single "Change", which charted highly on various online charts. The song reached number fourteen on the Gaon 2010 digital yearly chart with 2,469,354 copies sold. Ten days later, on January 14, the "Change" music video was flagged with a 19+ rating by the Ministry of Gender Equality and Family for being inappropriate for minors. Cube Entertainment stated that the music video would be re-edited and submitted for approval. However, broadcast station SBS, announced the music video would be restricted for a 15+ audience instead, and MBC announced that it would still be viewable for all audiences. Hyuna's "Change" promotions ended in March 2010. She released a few more singles in 2010, including "Love Parade" featuring T-max's member Park Yun-hwa, "Outlaw in the Wild" featuring Nassun, and produced by E-Tribe. Hyuna also participated in G.NA's duet single "Say You Love Me", for which she wrote the rap lyrics. In October 2010, she made a cameo appearance in the thriller film Midnight FM with 4Minute member Jihyun on October 14, 2010.

=== 2011–2015: Breakthrough and comeback with 4Minute ===
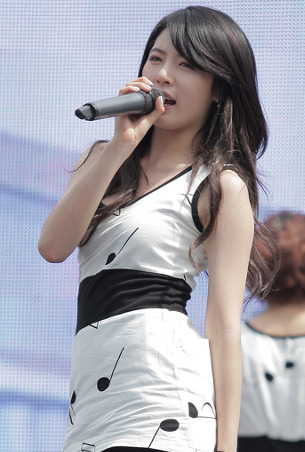
Hyuna performing in May 2011

In 2011, Hyuna appeared in the Korean version of Dancing with the Stars. The show began broadcasting on June 10. The same year, she released her first mini album, Bubble Pop, featuring five new songs including the title track of the same name. The single was a global success, and featured on top of YouTube's "most watched today" chart after gaining one million views in two days. It eventually became the first music video by a K-pop artist to surpass 100 million views. Hyuna was ranked 17th on Billboard's '21 Under 21′, a staff-compiled list of notable young acts; while "Bubble Pop" was listed as ninth place on Spin magazine's "Best 20 Songs of 2011." On November 24, 2011, Cube revealed that she would be in a co-ed unit called Trouble Maker with BEAST's Hyunseung. Trouble Maker's first mini album, Trouble Maker, consisted of a dance track and an emotional ballad, as well as solo songs for both Hyuna and Hyunseung. Trouble Maker performed for the first time at the Mnet Asian Music Awards.

In March 2012, she joined The Birth of a Family, an "animal communion variety" program where idols adopt stray pets and take care of them for a certain period of time to raise awareness for animal rights. On March 14, Hyuna announced the launch of her brand Hyuna x SPICYCOLOR. She also appeared in Psy's viral music video for "Gangnam Style," having been selected personally by Psy during the initial production stage. "Gangnam Style" became the most viewed K-pop music video, and drew worldwide global recognition for Hyuna. Psy released the female version of "Gangnam Style", known as "Oppa Is Just My Style" in August 2012, featuring additional vocals by Hyuna herself. Hyuna released her second mini album titled Melting on October 21, 2012, with the title track "Ice Cream". The song was produced by Brave Brothers and was the first collaborative effort between the producer and Hyuna as a solo artist. The video for Ice Cream was released on October 22, 2012, and features a cameo by Psy. "Ice Cream" drew global attention, after being featured by several international media outlets. It drew a record number of views on YouTube and became the then-fastest Korean music video to reach 20 million views. Melting is also notable for Hyuna's contributions as a lyricist and composer for "Very Hot" and "To My Boyfriend". In the same month, it was announced that she would join four other K-pop stars; Sistar's Hyolyn, Secret's Jun Hyo-seong, After School's Nana and Kara's Nicole to form a project group titled "Dazzling Red". The group performed at the 2012 SBS Gayo Daejeon.

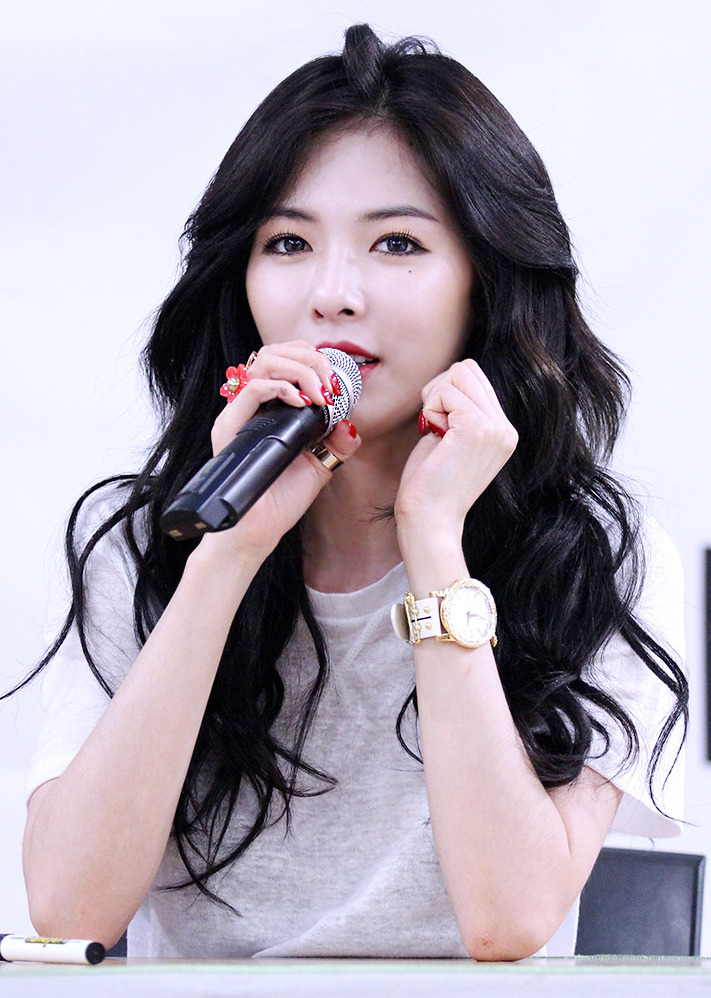
Hyuna at Gimpo Airport in 2014

On May 24, Hyuna collaborated with makeup artists Son & Park to launch a series of charitable activities titled "Kiss of Hope", whose profits were donated to the education of children in poor countries. In March, she became a spokesmodel for the 2013 Toyota Corolla. Hyuna released the short music video "Corolla x Hyuna: My Color", and the "Corolla x Hyuna" mobile app which teaches her song and choreography. On March 11, she performed at the K-Pop Night Out at SXSW at Austin, Texas. Hyuna then went to Los Angeles to film a Funny or Die sketch with British singer Rita Ora. The two stars' "Better Walk" video was released on "Funny or Die" on April 2, 2014. In October, she and Hyunseung made a comeback as Trouble Maker. They released the single "Now" from their Chemistry EP. The song reached number one on ten of Korea's major music charts, and was deemed by Instiz.net as an All-Kill. It also topped Billboard K-Pop Hot 100 chart. In July 2014, she released her third album titled A Talk and its lead single "Red". To promote the album, Hyuna appeared in her own reality show titled Hyuna's Free Month, which showcased various aspects of her daily life. Red proved to be a success, with Billboard praising her for establishing herself as a global pop brand and Rolling Stone naming "Red" number five on their list of the top ten music videos of 2014. The album also topped charts in Taiwan. In August 2015, she released her fourth mini album A+, with the lead single titled "Because I'm the Best" featuring Jung Il-hoon. Hyuna made her comeback on M! Countdown and performed "Ice, Ice" featuring Hwasa.

=== 2016–present: Continued soloist success, label changes and upcoming projects ===
On June 13, 2016, it was announced that 4Minute had made the decision to disband. Hyuna was the only member of the group to renew her contract with Cube Entertainment. Following the group's disbandment, she resumed her activities as a solo artist, with the release of her fifth mini album A'wesome and its title track "How's This?" (Korean: 어때 (eottae?), on August 1, 2016. Behind-the-scenes footage of Hyuna's album's preparation was featured on her solo reality program HyunA X19. The album topped nine local music charts upon release. She embarked on her first solo Asia tour soon after. To mark her tenth anniversary, Hyuna announced a fan-meeting tour in North America. She visited ten cities in total during February 2017. On April 3, 2017, Cube Entertainment confirmed that she and Pentagon members Hui and E'Dawn were set to debut in May as new sub-unit, Triple H. On April 4, Cube TV debuted a new reality TV program called Triple H Detective Agency. Hyuna released her sixth mini album Following and its title track "Babe" on August 29, 2017. On December 2, 2017, the rapper attended the 2017 Melon Music Awards, where she premiered the single "Lip & Hip". It was officially released two days later.

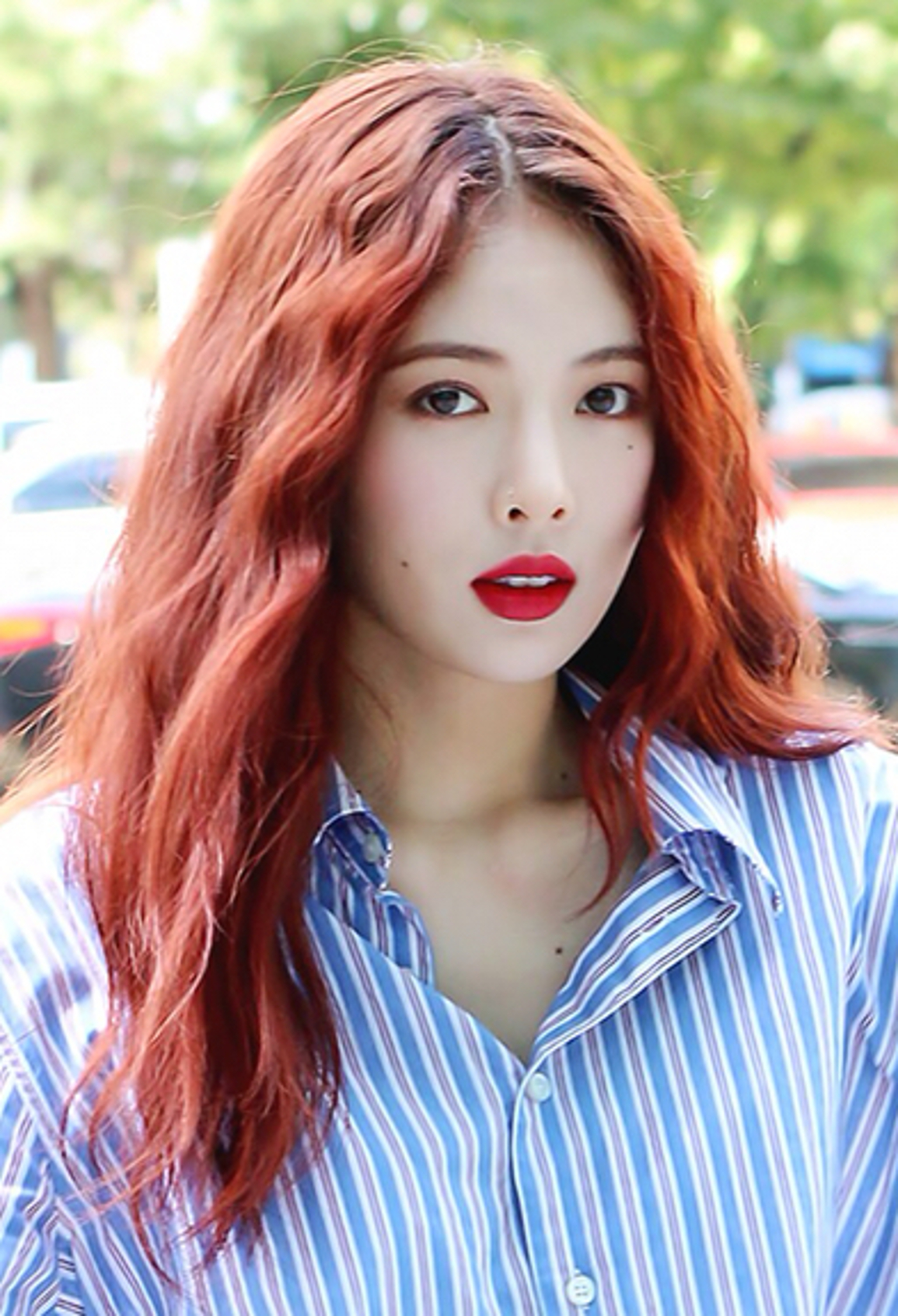
Hyuna in September 2017

On August 2, 2018, photos of Hyuna with Pentagon's E'Dawn were released. Cube Entertainment denied rumors that they were dating, however, she and E'Dawn held an interview with Yeonhap News later that day, admitting to their relationship which began in May 2016, after they had got to know each other through their project group Triple H promotions. The company responded to Hyuna's confirmation of the dating rumors by cancelling all previously planned performances for Triple H, on-air appearances and fan events including a fan meet-up that was scheduled on the next day. Fans were divided in reactions to the event, with some calling for E'Dawn to be removed from Pentagon, and others focusing on how the company mistreated her and E'Dawn after releasing the scandal, rather than on their relationship. On September 13, Cube Entertainment announced that they would be terminating their contracts, citing that they could not "maintain trust" with them. However, the company announced that they would still remain in discussion with both of them until further notice. Cube Entertainment cited "loss of trust" as a reason saying "After much deliberation, we've concluded that the trust between the company and the artists had been damaged to a degree that it cannot be restored, leading us to believe expulsion is necessary," in its official statement. On October 15, Cube Entertainment officially confirmed Hyuna's departure.

On January 27, 2019, she signed with P Nation, a new agency founded by Psy since he left YG Entertainment in May 2018. On November 5, 2019, she released a single titled Flower Shower, her first release under P Nation. In January 2021, P Nation announced Hyuna's first comeback since "Flower Shower", with the release of her seventh EP I'm Not Cool and its title track of the same name, which was released on January 28. On September 9, 2021, Hyuna and Dawn collaborated to release their duet EP 1+1=1.

On June 7, 2022, it was announced that Hyuna would be attending the J-Rim Super Nova Festival with Dawn, taking place on July 2–3, 2022. On July 20, 2022, Hyuna released her eighth EP Nabillera and its title track of the same name. On August 29, 2022, P Nation announced that Hyuna would be leaving the company after deciding not to renew her contract.

On November 6, 2023, it was reported that Hyuna had signed an exclusive contract with At Area.

In April 2024, it was announced that Hyuna would make a comeback on May 2 with her ninth EP Attitude with the title track Q&A.

On April 16, 2025, it was announced that Hyuna would make a comeback on April 30 with a new single titled Mrs. Nail.

== Personal life ==
On November 28, 2019, Hyuna posted a letter on Instagram where she opened up about her health. She revealed that, in 2016, she was diagnosed with depression and panic disorder. Additionally, she revealed she experienced foggy vision, causing her to collapse. Thinking they were symptoms of her panic disorder, she ignored it. However, after seeing a doctor, she received a brain wave test that concluded a diagnosis of vasovagal syncope. The following year Hyuna opened up about her struggles on MBC's Radio Star, where she stated she has been struggling for nearly 10 years with vasovagal syncope.

=== Relationships ===
On August 2, 2018, Hyuna revealed that she has been in a relationship with Pentagon member E'Dawn since May 2016. They got engaged on February 3, 2022, with the couple posting the announcement on Instagram. In November 2022, Hyuna posted on her Instagram account that the couple had separated.

On July 8, 2024, Hyuna's agency announced that she would be marrying singer Yong Jun-hyung. The wedding took place on October 11, 2024.

== Endorsements ==
On March 15, 2018, Hyuna became the ambassador for the German brand Puma, where she digested the two opposing concepts of 'Pink or Black" for the brand's campaign. On March 19, 2019, Hyuna released pictorial and a video, for 'Puma Light Sandals' campaign, where she appeared as the brand ambassador alongside Dawn. Later in 2019 Hyuna inked endorsement deal with the brand again, where she released a pictorial and a video for 'Trail Fox' campaign. In March 2020, Calvin Klein announced Hyuna as their ambassador for the "CK ONE" collections. On July 13, 2021, Spanish fashion house Loewe announced that they selected Hyuna as their new global ambassador.

== Filmography ==
=== Film ===
Year	Title	Role	Notes
2010	Midnight FM	Herself	Cameo

=== Television shows ===
Year	Title	Notes
2007	Show! Music Core	Host with Ahn So-hee and Brian Joo
2009–2010	Invincible Youth	Cast member (as part a G7 member)
2010	Waving the Korean Flag	Cast member
2011	Dancing with the Stars	Contestant (partnered with Nam Kee-yong)
2012	Birth of a Family 2	Cast member
2014	Hyuna's Free Month	Documentary
2016	Hyuna X 19	Documentary
2017	Triple H Detective Agency	Cast member
2017–2018	The Unit: Idol Rebooting Project	Mentor

== Discography ==
=== Extended plays ===
- Bubble Pop! (2011)
- Melting (2012)
- A Talk (2014)
- A+ (2015)
- A'wesome (2016)
- Following (2017)
- I'm Not Cool (2021)
- Nabillera (2022)
- Attitude (2024)

=== Collaborative EP ===
- 1+1=1 with Dawn (2021)

== Concerts ==
Headlining

- The Queen's Back (2016–2017)

Co-headlining

- United Cube Concert – One (with other United Cube artists) (2018)

Festivals

- SXSW Music Festival in North America (2013)
- Viral Fest Asia 2016 (2016)
