= 2022 MAMA Awards =

24th edition of the MAMA Awards held in 2022

- Date: November 29–30, 2022
- Venue: Kyocera Dome Osaka, Osaka, Japan
- Presented by: Yogibo
- Hosted by: Jeon Somi (Nov 29); Park Bo-gum (Nov 30)

Highlights
- Most wins: BTS (6)
- Website: 2022 MAMA Awards

Television/radio coverage
- Network: Mnet, across CJ E&M channels, and other international networks

The 2022 MAMA Awards took place on November 29 and 30, 2022 at the Kyocera Dome Osaka, Japan. It was hosted by singer Jeon Somi and actor and singer Park Bo-gum. It was broadcast live through music channel Mnet.

== Background ==
On August 23, 2022, CJ E&M announced that the "Mnet Asian Music Awards" would be rebranded as simply the "MAMA Awards" going forward. The theme for the ceremony was "K-POP World Citizenship" with sub-themes per night: "The world we build together" for first day, and "We are K-POP" for the second. The ceremony is the first to carry the new rebranded name, the first to take place overseas during the COVID-19 pandemic, and the 24th in the show's history.

On November 16, Mnet announced the hosts of the ceremony, Jeon Somi will be hosting day 1 while Park Bo-gum will host day 2. They also announced that BTS member, J-hope, will perform and collaboration stages.

This year's ceremony saw the addition of the MAMA Platinum award which will be given to artists who've won all four Grand Prizes (Daesang) in a single night. BTS was the first, and so far only, artist to receive the award, by virtue of winning all of the four Grand Prizes in the previous three editions.

=== Selection process ===
All songs that have been released from November 1, 2021, to October 21, 2022, are eligible to be nominated. On November 9, 2022, Mnet announced that due to the changes in Twitter which makes securing and collecting data impossible, they will remove all Twitter votes from the Worldwide Icon of the Year and Worldwide Fan's Choice category without making adjustments to the other sources.

| Division | MAMA professional panel (Local and foreign) | Digital sales | Record sales | Global music video view counts | Online voting |
|---|---|---|---|---|---|
| Artist of the Year | 40% | 30% (20% South Korea + 10% Global) | 30% | — | — |
| Categories by Artist (Note: Best New Male/Female Artist, Best Male/Female Artist, Best Male/Female Group.) | 40% | 30% (20% South Korea + 10% Global) | 30% | — | — |
| Song of the Year | 40% | 60% (40% South Korea + 20% Global) | — | — | — |
| Categories by Genre (Note: Best Dance Performance (Solo/Male/Female Group), Best Vocal Performance (Solo/Group), Best Hip-hop & Urban Music, Best Band Performance, Best Collaboration, Best OST.) | 40% | 60% (40% South Korea + 20% Global) | — | — | — |
| Album of the Year (Note: Only albums with 5 new songs or more.) | 40% | — | 60% | — | — |
| Best Music Video | 70% | — | — | 30% | — |
| Worldwide Icon of the Year (Note: Pre-voting is open from October 24 to November 4, 2022. Main voting period will be held from November 10 to November 24, 2022. Twitter live vote is open until during the ceremony, before being dropped) | — | — | — | 10% | 50% (Mnet Plus); 30% (Spotify votes); ~~10% (Twitter)~~ |
| Worldwide Fans' Choice Top 10 | — | — | — | 10% | 50% (Mnet Plus); 30% (Spotify votes); ~~10% (Twitter)~~ |

== Performers ==
On October 26, Mnet announced the first line up of artists for the ceremony. On November 9, Mnet announced the second line up of artists for the ceremony.

=== Day 1 ===
| Artist(s) | Song(s) | Stage theme title |
|---|---|---|
| Jeon Somi and Leejung Lee (with YGX) | Songs From Worldwide Fans' Choice Nominated Artist (Note: Aespa's "Illusion", Seventeen's "Hot", Twice's "Talk That Talk", NCT 127's "2 Baddies", NCT Dream's "Glitch Mode", Stray Kids' "Maniac", Treasure's "Jikjin", Mamamoo's "Illella", Tomorrow X Together's "Good Boy Gone Bad", Itzy's "Sneakers", Got7's "Nanana", Enhypen's "Future Perfect (Pass the Mic)", Ateez's "Guerrilla", Blackpink's "Pink Venom", and BTS' "Yet to Come (The Most Beautiful Moment)") | "The New Passion" |
| Nmixx | "O.O", "Dice" | "Downside Up" |
| DKZ | "Uh-Heung" | "The Final Destination" |
| Hyolyn | "Layin' Low" | "Two Women" |
| Bibi | "Bibi Vengeance" | "Two Women" |
| Bibi + Hyolyn | "Youknowbetter", "Law" | "Two Women" |
| JO1 | "SuperCali" (MAMA version) | "I Am, I Wish, I Will" |
| Le Sserafim | "Antifragile", "Fearless" | "Dear You Who Wish for My Fall" |
| Kep1er | "The Girls (Can't Turn Me Down)", "Wa Da Da" | "The Girls WaDaDa to Dream" |
| Forestella | "Fake Love" (BTS cover), "Save Our Lives" | "Live a Life of Love" |
| Street Man Fighter & Kang Daniel | "World Changer" | "Dance Makes One" |
| Ive, Kep1er, Nmixx, Le Sserafim, NewJeans | "Eleven" (Note: performed by Jang Won-young of Ive; Xiaoting and Huening Bahiyyih of Kep1er; Sullyoon of Nmixx; Sakura of Le Sserafim; and Danielle of NewJeans), "Wa Da Da" (Note: performed by Rei and Liz of Ive; Mashiro, Kim Chae-hyun and Hikaru of Kep1er; Haewon and Jiwoo of Nmixx; Hong Eun-chae of Le Sserafim; and Hanni of NewJeans), "O.O" (Note: performed by Gaeul of Ive; Kim Da-yeon and Kang Ye-seo of Kep1er; Lily and Jinni of Nmixx; Kazuha of Le Sserafim; and Minji of NewJeans), "Fearless" (Note: performed by An Yu-jin of Ive; Seo Young-eun of Kep1er; Bae of Nmix; Huh Yun-jin of Le Sserafim; and Hyein of NewJeans), "Hype Boy" (Note: performed by Leeseo of Ive; Choi Yu-jin of Kep1er; Kyujin of Nmixx; Kim Chae-won of Le Sserafim; and Haerin of NewJeans) "Cheer Up" (Twice cover) | "LINNK the Next Generation" |
| Tomorrow X Together | "Opening Sequence", "Lonely Boy", "Good Boy Gone Bad" | "Goodbye Romeo" |
| Kara | "Lupin", "Step", "Mister", "When I Move" | "Kara Is Back" |
| Stray Kids | "Venom" (MAMA version), "Maniac" (MAMA version) | "Do You Want to Be Oddinary?" |

=== Day 2 ===
| Artist(s) | Song(s) | Stage theme title | Ref. |
|---|---|---|---|
| Jung Jae-il | "Parasite", "Squid Game" | "The Letter from Music" | |
| Jung Jae-il, Tiger JK & 3Racha | "Music Makes One" | "The Letter from Music" | |
| Tempest | "Dragon" | "Fly High" | |
| NewJeans | Intro, (Note: "Cookie", "Attention", "Hurt", "Hype Boy" (MAMA version)) "Hype Boy", "Attention" | "NewFriends" | |
| Enhypen | "Blessed-Cursed", "Walk the Line", "Future Perfect (Pass the Mic)" | "Manifesto: 革命" | |
| Ive | "Eleven", "Love Dive", "After Like" | "God Is Alive" | |
| NiziU and INI | "Yuki no Hana" (Mika Nakashima cover), "Clap" (Seventeen cover) | "Into the Universe" | |
| NiziU | "Clap Clap" | "Into the Universe" | |
| INI | "Spectra" | "Into the Universe" | |
| Treasure | "Volkno", "Jikjin", "Hello" | "We Don't Need Way Back" | |
| (G)I-dle and Jaurim | "Twenty-Five, Twenty-One", "Tomboy" & "Boxing Helena", "Beeswax Angel" | "We Never Die" | |
| Jaurim | "Hahaha Song" | "We Never Die" | |
| (G)I-dle | "My Bag", "Tomboy" | "We Never Die" | |
| Itzy | "Cheshire", "Sneakers" | "Birth of a Queen" | |
| Lim Young-woong and Monika | "If We Ever Meet Again" | "Good, Bye" | |
| Zico, Street Man Fighter and Soyeon of (G)I-dle | "New Thing", "Freak" | "Freakout" | |
| J-Hope | "More", "Arson", "Future" | "I'm Your Hope" | |

== Presenters ==
2022 MAMA Awards hosts

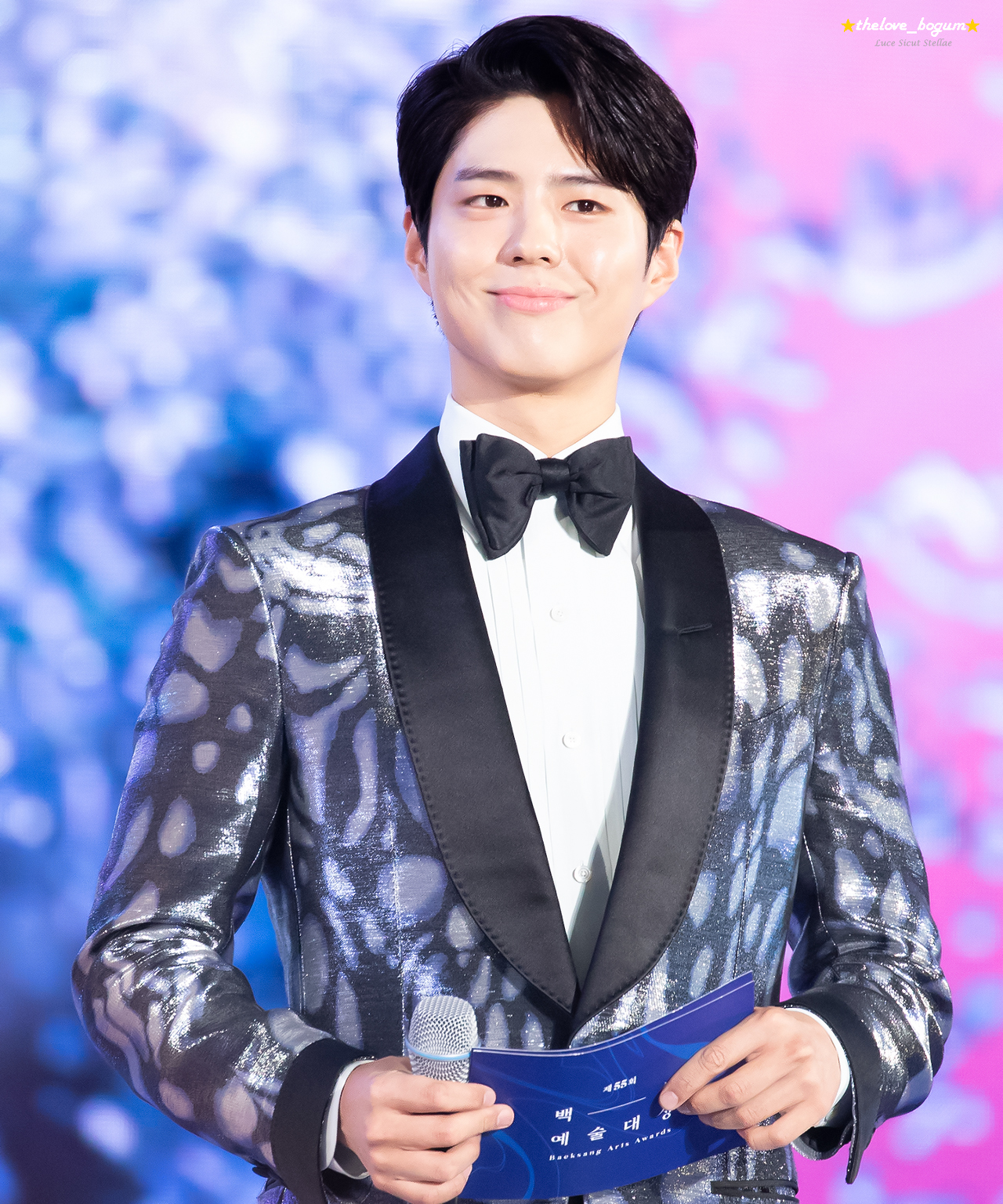
Park Bo-gum

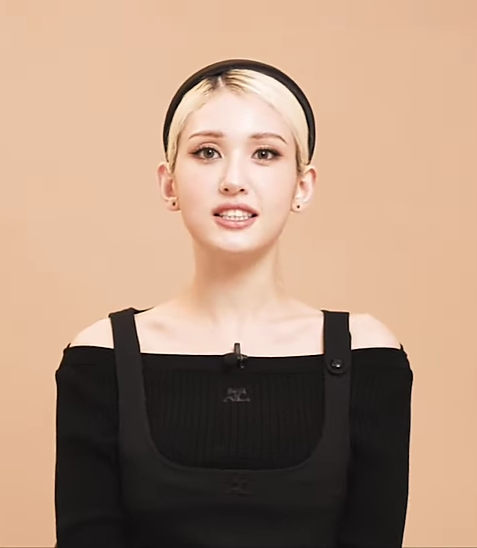
Jeon Somi

=== Day 1 ===
- Ahn Hyun-mo, Nam Yoon-su and Gabee – Red Carpet Hosts
- Joo Jung-hyuk – Worldwide Fans' Choice Top 10
- Kang Han-na – Favorite New Artist and Worldwide Fans' Choice Top 10
- Kwak Yoon-gy and Gabee – Yogibo Chill Artist Award
- Nam Yoon-su and Mio Imada – Worldwide Fans' Choice Top 10 and Favorite New Artist
- Park Sung-hoon – Favorite New Artist and Worldwide Fans' Choice Top 10
- Pak Se-ri – Favorite Asian Artist and Worldwide Fans' Choice Top 10
- Lee Jae-wook – Favorite New Artist and Worldwide Fans' Choice Top 10
- Seo Ji-hye – Worldwide Fans' Choice Top 10
- Park Bo-gum – Worldwide Icon of the Year

=== Day 2 ===
- Ahn Hyun-mo, Nam Yoon-su and Aiki – Red Carpet Hosts
- Enhypen – Best New Male Group
- Yeo Jin-goo – Inspiring Achievement
- Woo Do-hwan and Han Sun-hwa – Best Male Artist and Best Female Artist
- Nam Yoon-su and Aiki – Global Music Trend Leader
- Moon Ga-young – Breakout Producer
- Yeo Jin-goo and Kim So-hyun – Most Popular Male Artist
- Kim Hae-joon and Lee Eun-ji – Best Dance Performance Female Group
- Hwang Min-hyun and Ahn So-hee – Favorite Female Group and Best Dance Performance Male Group
- Kentaro Sakaguchi – Album of the Year
- Jung Woo-sung – Song of the Year
- Yuna Kim – Artist of the Year
- Hwang Jung-min – MAMA Platinum

== Winners and nominees ==
The nominees were announced during the live announcement last October 24, 2022 at 6PM KST. Voting opened an hour after. Winners and nominees are listed in alphabetical order. Winners listed first and highlighted in bold.

=== Main awards ===
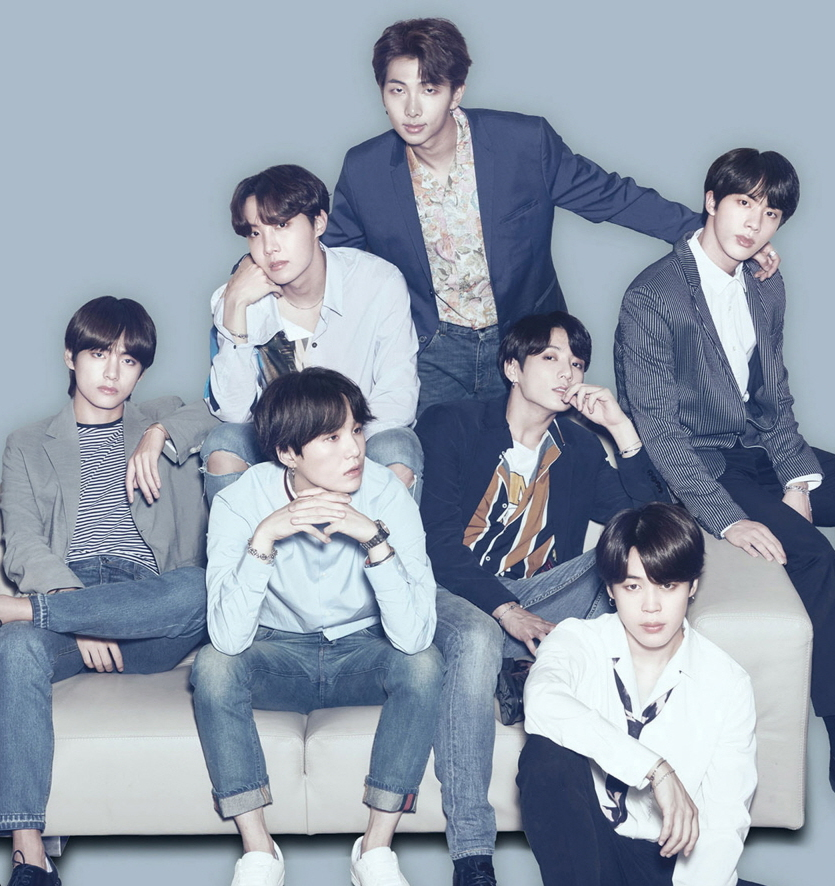
BTS won six awards, including the Album of the Year (Daesang), Artist of the Year (Daesang), Best Male Group, MAMA Platinum, Worldwide Fans' Choice - Top 10, and Worldwide Icon of the Year

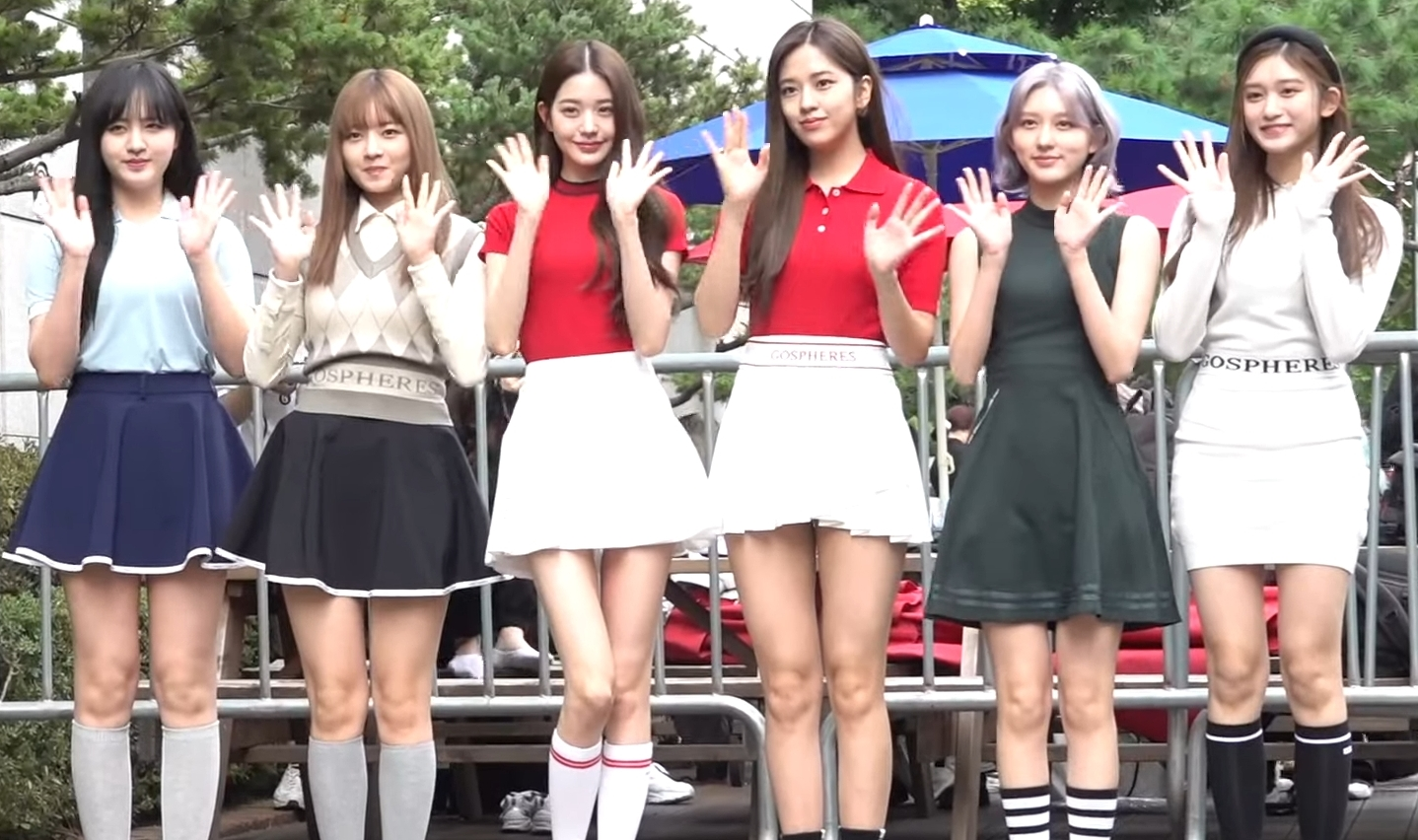
Ive won four awards, including the Song of the Year (Daesang), Best New Female Artist, Favourite New Artist, and Best Dance Performance - Female Group

| Artist of the Year (Daesang) | Song of the Year (Daesang) |
|---|---|
| **BTS**; (G)I-dle; Blackpink; Ive; Stray Kids | **Ive – "Love Dive"**; (G)I-dle – "Tomboy"; Blackpink – "Pink Venom"; BTS – "Yet to Come (The Most Beautiful Moment)"; NewJeans – "Attention" |
| Album of the Year (Daesang) | Worldwide Icon of the Year (Daesang) |
| **BTS – Proof**; Blackpink – Born Pink; NCT Dream – Glitch Mode; Seventeen – Face the Sun; Stray Kids – Maxident | **BTS**; Blackpink; Enhypen; Got7; NCT Dream; Psy; Seventeen; Stray Kids; Tomorrow X Together; Treasure |
| Best Male Group | Best Female Group |
| **BTS**; Enhypen; NCT Dream; Seventeen; Stray Kids; Tomorrow X Together | **Blackpink**; (G)I-dle; Aespa; Itzy; Red Velvet; Twice |
| Best Male Artist | Best Female Artist |
| **Lim Young-woong**; J-Hope; Kang Daniel; Psy; Zico | **Nayeon**; IU; Miyeon; Seulgi; Taeyeon |
| Best Dance Performance – Male Group | Best Dance Performance – Female Group |
| **Seventeen – "Hot"**; NCT 127 – "2 Baddies"; NCT Dream – "Glitch Mode"; Stray Kids – "Maniac"; Tomorrow X Together – "Good Boy Gone Bad"; Treasure – "Jikjin" | **Ive – "Love Dive"**; (G)I-dle – "Tomboy"; Blackpink – "Pink Venom"; Le Sserafim – "Fearless"; NewJeans – "Attention"; Red Velvet – "Feel My Rhythm" |
| Best Dance Performance – Solo | Best Vocal Performance – Solo |
| **Psy – "That That" (feat. Suga)**; Jessi – "Zoom"; Nayeon – "Pop!"; Sunmi – "Heart Burn"; Choi Ye-na – "Smiley" (feat. Bibi) | **Taeyeon – "INVU"**; IU – "Drama"; Kim Min-seok – "Drunken Confession"; Lee Mu-jin – "When It Snows" (feat. Heize); Lim Young-woong – "Our Blues, Our Life" |
| Best Vocal Performance – Group | Best Collaboration |
| **Big Bang – "Still Life"**; BTS – "Yet to Come (The Most Beautiful Moment)"; Davichi – "Fanfare"; Enhypen – "Polaroid Love"; Winner – "I Love U" | **Psy and Suga – "That That"**; 10cm and Big Naughty – "Just 10 Centimeters"; Crush and J-Hope – "Rush Hour"; Loco and Hwasa – "Somebody!"; Woo Won-jae and Meenoi – "Ghosting" |
| Best New Male Artist | Best New Female Artist |
| **Xdinary Heroes**; ATBO; Tempest; TNX; Younite | **Ive**; Kep1er; Le Sserafim; NewJeans; Nmixx; Choi Ye-na |
| Best OST | Best HipHop & Urban Music |
| **MeloMance – "Love, Maybe" (from Business Proposal)**; 10cm – "Drawer" (from Our Beloved Summer); Jimin and Ha Sung-woon – "With You" (from Our Blues); V – "Christmas Tree" (from Our Beloved Summer); Wonstein – "Your Existence" (from Twenty-Five Twenty-One) | **Jay Park – "Ganadara" (feat. IU)**; Be'O – "Counting Stars" (feat. Beenzino); Big Naughty – "Beyond Love" (feat. 10cm); J-Hope – "More"; Zico – "Freak" |
| Best Band Performance | Best Music Video |
| **Xdinary Heroes – "Happy Death Day"**; Jannabi – "Grippin' the Green"; Jaurim – "Stay with Me"; Lucy – "Play"; The Black Skirts – "My Little Lambs" | **Blackpink – "Pink Venom"** |

=== Favorite awards ===
Worldwide Fans' Choice Top 10
**Blackpink**; **BTS**; **Enhypen**; **Got7**; **NCT Dream**; **Psy**; **Seventeen**; **Stray Kids**; **Tomorrow X Together**; **Treasure**; List of nominated artists: Aespa; Astro; Ateez; Big Bang; Billlie; Brave Girls; BtoB; Chungha; Crush; Dreamcatcher; Everglow; Fromis 9; (G)I-dle; Girls' Generation; Itzy; IU; Ive; Jay Park; Jessi; Jo Yu-ri; Kai; Kang Daniel; Kard; Kep1er; Le Sserafim; Loona; Mamamoo; Monsta X; NCT 127; NewJeans; Nmixx; Oneus; Pentagon; Red Velvet; STAYC; Sunmi; The Boyz; Twice; Winner; Yena
| Favorite New Artist | Favorite Asian Artist |
| **Ive**; **Kep1er**; **Le Sserafim**; **Nmixx** | **JO1** |
Favorite Female Group
**(G)I-dle**

=== Special awards ===
| Category | Winner |
|---|---|
| Yogibo Chill Artist | Stray Kids |
| Bibigo Culture and Style | J-Hope |
| Inspiring Achievement | Jaurim |
| Global Music Trend Leader | Zico |
| Most Popular Male Artist | J-Hope |
| Most Popular Group | Stray Kids |
| MAMA Platinum | BTS |

=== Professional categories ===
| Category | Winner | Work |
|---|---|---|
| Breakout Producer | Min Hee-jin | New Jeans |

=== Multiple awards ===
The following artist(s) received three or more awards:

| Awards | Artist(s) |
|---|---|
| 6 | BTS |
| 4 | Ive |
| 3 | Blackpink |
| 3 | Psy |
| 3 | Stray Kids |

== Broadcast ==
The ceremony was broadcast live worldwide from Mnet in South Korea, and wa simulcast across CJ E&M channels (where available); other international networks, and online via Mnet K-pop, Mnet TV, M2, and KCON's YouTube account. The red carpet wa be broadcast live two hours before the main ceremony.

| Country | Network | |
|---|---|---|
| Worldwide (Note: Restricted access in some countries due to broadcasting rights. See below this table.) | YouTube (Mnet K-Pop, Mnet TV, M2 and KCON Official) | |
| South Korea | Mnet, tvN Show (awards show only), TVING | |
| Japan | Mnet Japan, Mnet Smart+, au Smart Pass | |
| Singapore | Channel U (live highlights), MeWATCH | tvN Asia |
| Taiwan | FET Friday Video, FET Mobile Circle app (Far EasTone) | tvN Asia |
| Malaysia | TonTon (awards show only) | tvN Asia |
| Vietnam | FPT Play | |
| Philippines | tvN Asia (via Smart GigaPlay & Cignal (PLDT Group)) | |
| Hong Kong | tvN Asia | |
| Indonesia | tvN Asia | |
| Thailand | tvN Asia | |
| Myanmar | tvN Asia | |
| Maldives | tvN Asia | |
| Macau | tvN Asia | |
| Sri Lanka | tvN Asia | |
