= List of High School Rapper (season 2) contestants =

High School Rapper 2 is a South Korean Hip hop survival television show.

== Contestants ==
Color key

- Contestant in Final
- Elimination in Semi Final
- Elimination in Collaboration
- Elimination in Team Battle
- Elimination in Finalization

Mentor	Name	From	Grade	School	Round									#
Mentor	Name	From	Grade	School	Finalization	Team Battle	Collaboration			Semi Final	Final			#
Mentor	Name	From	Grade	School	Finalization	Team Battle	Guest judges	Audience	Total	Semi Final	1	2	Total	#
Hangzoo and Boi B	Oh Dam-ryul^{2} (CHIL CHILLA)	Ansan, Gyeonggi	3 grade	Ansan Design Culture High School	176	85	121	234	355	(eliminated)				12
Hangzoo and Boi B	Park Young-seo (Cloudybay)	Seoul	3 grade	Jungang Woman High School	141	(eliminated)								
Hangzoo and Boi B	Yoon Jin-young^{3} (Ash Island)	Busan	3 grade	Yongin High School	173	41	170	294	464	402	379	105	484	4
Hangzoo and Boi B	Bang Yeon-seo / Lee Ro-han^{4} (Webster B)	Gangneung, Gangwon	2 grade	GED	184	85	170	294	464	424	447	125	572	2
Hangzoo and Boi B	Lee Seung-hwa^{3} (Ellick)	Gwangmyeong, Gyeonggi	2 grade	Gwangmyeong Management Accounting High School	154	41	(eliminated)							13
Hangzoo and Boi B	Kim Sung-ho	Jeju	2 grade	Jeju National University High School	142	(eliminated)								
Hangzoo and Boi B	Song Jae-hoon	Seoul	2 grade	Korea Art High School	151	(eliminated)								
Hangzoo and Boi B	Seok Min^{1}	Gwangmyeong, Gyeonggi	1 grade	Chunghyeon High School	131	(eliminated)								
Groovy Room	Kim Young-kyun^{6} (Hwiyoung)	Seoul	3 grade	Hanlim Multi Art High School	154	(eliminated)								
Groovy Room	Park Jun-ho^{5} (Pullik)	Seoul	3 grade	Seoul National University High School	159	79	161	242	403	298	(eliminated)			9
Groovy Room	Kim Ha-on^{1} ^{2} ^{4} (Haon)	Namyangju, Gyeonggi	2 grade	GED	191	79	190	281	471	473	445	134	579	1
Groovy Room	Lee Byung-jae^{4} (Vinxen)	Incheon	2 grade	GED	180	15	190	281	471	468	443	91	534	3
Groovy Room	Jo Eun-san	Namyangju, Gyeonggi	2 grade	Deokso High School	128	(eliminated)								
Groovy Room	Go Joon-seo	Jeju	1 grade	Namnyeong High School	63	(eliminated)								
Groovy Room	Kim Min-seok	N/A	Pre 1 grade	N/A	146	(eliminated)								
Groovy Room	Ha Seon-ho^{7} (Sandy)	Seoul	Pre 1 grade	Seoul Foreign Language School	162	15	(eliminated)							16
San E and Cheetah	Kim Yoon-ho^{2} ^{4} (Yenjamin)	Seoul	3 grade	Sungsil High School	160	81	156	266	422	340	(eliminated)			7
San E and Cheetah	Bang Jae-min^{2} ^{4} (A.mond)	Seoul	3 grade	Hanlim Multi Art High School	152	81	124	272	396	332	(eliminated)			8
San E and Cheetah	Bin Ha-neul^{8}	Seoul	3 grade	Hanlim Multi Art High School	N/A	(eliminated)								
San E and Cheetah	Kim Geun-soo	Seoul	2 grade	St. Paul American High School Shanghai	176	59	124	272	396	264	(eliminated)			10
San E and Cheetah	Jo Won-woo^{1} ^{2} (H2adin)	Busan	2 grade	GED	178	59	156	266	422	436	377	45	422	5
San E and Cheetah	Kim Hyo-dong (Wavy)	Busan	1 grade	Kyongil High School	148	(eliminated)								
San E and Cheetah	Lee Min-woo	Seoul	1 grade	Kyunggi High School	151	(eliminated)								
San E and Cheetah	Park Ji-won	Seoul	Pre 1 grade	Seongbu Junior School	133	(eliminated)								
Deepflow	Kim Sae-ryung (BNOM)	Asan, South Chuncheong	3 grade	Baebang High School	116	(eliminated)								
Deepflow	Lee Ji-eun^{2} ^{9} (Isabella)	Seoul	2 grade	Korea Art High School	121	19	(eliminated)							15
Deepflow	Yoon Byung-ho^{2} (Bully Da Ba$tard)	Icheon, Gyeonggi	2 grade	GED	171	21	176	262	438	396	(eliminated)			6
Deepflow	Park Jin-oh (J1no)	Bucheon, Gyeonggi	1 grade	Zion High School	141	21	(eliminated)							13
Deepflow	Ji Min-hyuk^{10}	Cheongju, North Chuncheong	1 grade	Heungdeok High School	115	(eliminated)								
Deepflow	Kim Eun-ji (Quinsha)	Busan	1 grade	Seongmo High School	N/A	(eliminated)								
Deepflow	Alice	Seoul	1 grade	Dulwich College Seoul	N/A	(eliminated)								
Deepflow	Lee Ye-chan^{1}	Seoul	Pre 1 grade	Dongjak Junior School	157	19	154	215	374	(eliminated)				11

== Team Finalization - Your Personal Story (Episodes 2 - 3) ==
Lee Ye-chan team
Place	Student	Score	%
1	Yoon Byung-ho	171	85.5
2	Lee Ye-chan	157	78.5
3	Park Jin-oh	141	70.5
4	Lee Ji-eun	121	60.5
5	Kim Se-ryung	116	58.0
6	Ji Min-hyuk	115	57.5
-	Kim Eun-ji	-	-
-	Alice	-	-

Results for students Kim Eun-ji and Alice weren't disclosed. Afterwards, Deepflow became the team's mentor.

Seok Min team
Place	Students	Score	%
1	Bae Yeon-seo	184	92.0
2	Oh Dam-ryul	176	88.0
3	Yoon Jin-young	173	86.5
4	Lee Seung-hwa	154	77.0
5	Song Jae-hoon	151	75.5
6	Kim Seong-ho	142	71.0
7	Park Young-seo	141	70.5
8	Seok Min	131	65.5

Afterwards, the team chose Hangzoo and Boi B as their mentors.

Kim Ha-on team
Place	Students	Score	%
1	Kim Haon	191	95.5
2	Lee Byung-jae	180	90.0
3	Ha Seon-ho	162	81.0
4	Park Joon-ho	159	79.5
5	Hwi-young	154	77.0
6	Kim Min-seok	153	76.5
7	Jo Eun-san	128	64.0
8	Go Jun-seo	63	31.5

Afterwards, Groovy Room was chosen as the team's mentors.

Kim Yoon-ho team
Place	Students	Score	%
1	Jo Won-woo	178	89.0
2	Kim Geun-soo	176	88.0
3	Kim Yoon-ho	160	80.0
4	Bang Jae-min	152	76.0
5	Lee Min-woo	151	75.5
6	Kim Hyo-dong	148	74.0
7	Park Ji-won	133	66.5
-	Bin Ha-neul	-	-

Bin Ha-neul's results weren't disclosed. Afterwards, the team chose San E and Cheetah for their mentors.

== Team Battle - Textbook Literature (Episodes 4-5) ==
Categories		Mentor	Groups		Song	Point (max. votes 100)
Poem	VS	San E, Cheetah	Jo Won-woo	Kim Geun-soo	Cast Away the Useless	59
Poem	VS	Hangzoo, Boi B	Yoon Jin-young	Lee Seung-hwa*	Wavering Flower	41
Poem	VS	Hangzoo, Boi B	Bae Yeon-seo	Oh Dam-ryul	Buk	85
Poem	VS	Groovy Room	Lee Byung-jae	Ha Seon-ho*	By Burning Thirst	15
Novel	VS	Groovy Room	Kim Ha-on	Park Joon-ho	The Little Prince	79
Novel	VS	Deepflow	Yoon Byung-ho	Park Jin-oh*	Wan-deuk	21
Novel	VS	San E, Cheetah	Kim Yoon-ho	Bang Jae-min	Oseong and Haneum	81
Novel	VS	Deepflow	Lee Ye-chan	Lee Ji-eun*	Camellia Blossoms	19

== Team Battle - Collaboration with Mentors (Episodes 5 - 6) ==
Groups	#	Mentor	Student(s)	Song	Guest Judges (max. votes 200)	%	Audience (max. votes 300)	%	Total (from 500 votes)	%
Perform with Mentors	1	Deepflow	Yoon Byung-ho	Rain	176	88.0	262	87.3	438	87.6
Perform with Mentors	2	Groovy Room	Park Joon-ho	MADMAX (feat. Woodie Gochild)	161	80.5	242	80.7	403	80.6
Perform with Mentors	3	Hangzoo, Boi B	Oh Dam-ryul	Young Waves	121	60.5	234	78.0	355	71.0
Perform with Mentors	4	San E, Cheetah	Bang Jae-min, Kim Geun-soo	Santa Claus	124	62.0	272	90.7	396	79.2
Perform on Mentor's Beat	1	Hangzoo, Boi B	Bae Yeon-seo, Yoon Jin-young	Like It	170	85.0	294	98.0	464	92.8
Perform on Mentor's Beat	2	San E, Cheetah	Jo Won-woo, Kim Yoon-ho	Break Time	156	78.0	266	88.7	422	84.4
Perform on Mentor's Beat	3	Deepflow	Lee Ye-chan	March	154	77.0	218	72.7	374	74.4
Perform on Mentor's Beat	4	Groovy Room	Kim Ha-on, Lee Byung-jae	Barcode (prod. by BOYCOLD)	190	95.0	281	93.7	471	94.2

== Semi-Final (Episode 7) ==
#	Mentor	Student	Song	Points (max. votes 500)	%
1	San E, Cheetah	Bang Jae-min	Good Boy Syndrome (prod. by Im Jae-hyung)	332	66.4
2	Groovy Room	Park Joon-ho	Take Off	298	59.6
3	San E, Cheetah	Kim Yoon-ho	Movement (prod. by Bangroz)	340	68.0
4	Deepflow	Yoon Byung-ho	Alone	396	79.2
5	Hangzoo, Boi B	Yoon Jin-young	Night Vibe (Remake)	402	80.4
6	San E, Cheetah	Kim Geun-soo	Happy All Day	264	52.8
7	San E, Cheetah	Jo Won-woo	What Time	436	87.2
8	Groovy Room	Lee Byung-jae	Blame (prod. by BOYCOLD)	468	93.6
9	Hangzoo, Boi B	Bae Yeon-seo	Aim	424	84.8
10	Groovy Room	Kim Ha-on	Adios (prod. by BOYCOLD)	473	94.6

== Final (Episode 8) ==
#	Mentor	Student	Song	1st Round	%	2nd Round	%	Total
1	Hangzoo, Boi B	Yoon Jin-young	YAHO (feat. Geegooin)	379	75.8	105	21.0	484
2	Hangzoo, Boi B	Bae Yeon-seo	Lee Rohann (feat. ELO, Jessi)	447	89.4	125	25.0	572
3	San E, Cheetah	Jo Won-woo	053 (feat. Hanhae)	377	75.4	45	9.0	422
4	Groovy Room	Lee Byung-jae	Not at all (feat. Woo Won-jae)	443	88.6	91	18.2	534
5	Groovy Room	Kim Ha-on	Boong-boong (feat. Sik-K)	445	89.0	134	26.8	579

== Notes ==
- ^{1}Contestant was revived in wildcard challenge.
- ^{2}Oh Dam-ryul, Kim Ha-on, Kim Yoon-ho, Bang Jae-min, Jo Won-woo, Lee Ji-eun and Yoon Byung-ho was a previous contestant on High School Rapper.
- ^{3}Yoon Jin-young and Lee Seung-hwa are member of hip hop crew PABLO MU2IK.
- ^{4}Bang Yeon-seo, Kim Ha-on, Lee Byung-jae, Kim Yoon-ho and Bang Jae-min are members of hip hop crew KIFF CLAN.
- ^{5}Park Jun-ho is a son of actor Park Ho-san.
- ^{6}Kim Young-kyun (also known as Hwiyoung) is member of boy group SF9 under FNC Entertainment.
- ^{7}Ha Seon-ho is trainee under Mystic Entertainment. She was a participant on rap competition Show Me The Money 6.
- ^{8}Bin Ha-neul was a contenstant on girl group survival show Idol School.
- ^{9}Lee Ji-eun is a trainee under Music Works and was contenstant on survival show Mix Nine. Aftermath, she left the agency and debut as rapper with stage name Isabella on 2019 under Hot Dog Entertainment.
- ^{10}Ji Min-hyuk is actor.
