= Psy 9th =

Studio album by Psy
- Released: April 29, 2022
- Recorded: 2018–2022
- Genre: K-pop
- Length: 41:14
- Language: Korean
- Labels: School Boy; Republic; P Nation; Dreamus
- Producer: PSY

Psy chronology
| 4×2=8 (2017) | Psy 9th (2022) |

Singles from Psy 9th
- 1. "That That" Released: April 29, 2022; 2. "Celeb" Released: May 3, 2022; 3. "Happier" Released: May 19, 2022; 4. "Everyday" Released: June 3, 2022

Psy 9th (stylized as PSY 9th, Korean: 싸다9; RR: Ssada-gu (Note: The Korean title is a pun on the Korean word ssadagu (싸다구), which means a slap in the face. It is also an acronym for "Psy's colourful 9th album (싸이의 다채로운 9집)" according to Psy.)) is the ninth studio album by South Korean singer Psy. It was released on April 29, 2022, through School Boy, Republic, P Nation, and distributed by Dreamus Company. This album is Psy's first release in five years since 4×2=8 (2017) and his first to be published under his label (P Nation), which was established in January 2019. It is the first Psy album without the involvement of YG Entertainment since his departure on May 15, 2018. The album has twelve tracks including the lead single, "That That", featuring Suga of BTS, alongside various other guest appearances including Sung Si-kyung, Heize, Jessi, Hwasa, Crush, and Tablo.

== Background and release ==
The album was originally planned to be released in July 2019. On July 15, Psy exclusively pre-released the music videos for "Everyday", "Celeb", and "Happier". On December 30, 2021, Psy's publishing label P Nation announced the album would finally be released in the following year after multiple delays due to his schedules and management of his company.

On April 29, 2022, Psy held a listening party at a hotel in Seoul. Press attended. In the listening party, speaking about his reasons for releasing a physical album, Psy said he felt that CDs are an outdated format since, despite the CD format being popular among K-Pop idols, nobody has a CD player and releasing a CD-based album felt like a very exhausting move in this age. While he thought releasing a digital single might be more long-lasting, Psy felt that—as an artist in a "waist position", who connects his juniors and seniors in K-Pop—he wanted to balance the old and new in K-Pop and have a retro album in the digital age.

== Production and lyrics ==
The songs on Psy 9th were written during Psy's five-year hiatus since his previous studio album, 4×2=8, starting as early as 2018. During an interview, Psy revealed that the long production time was due to his reliance on collecting feedback from fellow artists, friends, and other people he trusts as he refines each song. Despite achieving international success, the album was not specifically targeted at a foreign audience, with Psy focusing on performances in Korea after its release. The singer cited the reception of "Gangnam Style" as his reason for focusing on domestic markets as he felt that the song's success overshadowed him as an artist, stating that, "some foreigners even think that my name is 'Gangnam Style'." He also compared the success of "Gangnam Style" with more junior idols who are currently famous in North America, such as BTS and Blackpink, who have achieved success for their personalities and thus have a more long-lasting quality to their popularity.

The album's feature song, "That That", was originally written by Suga, who approached Psy and asked to produce it for him. During production Suga became more involved in other aspects of the song and eventually recorded a rap verse and featured in the music video for the song. Psy tried to move away from the EDM feel of his previous songs, but still wanted an upbeat tempo. For this reason, he liked the accompaniment Suga recorded and found that the upbeat Latin feel fit perfectly.

"Ganji" was offered to Jessi while she was performing her latest single, "Zoom". Psy attempted new flow styles in the song and reflected the frustrations of translating Jessi's English lyrics into Korean. Psy asked Sung Si Kyung to feature in the song "You Move Me". Despite being a frequent collaborator with Sung, he found it was more awkward to request him to participate in the song. The song is about life, and Psy felt the song was finished with Sung's special diction regarding the song's Korean lyrics. "Sleepless" was recorded in a single day; Psy has stated that he hoped it would heal people's souls who are tired from a hard night at work. "Happier" was finished in 2019 before Crush became part of Psy's company P nation. "Celeb" was originally going to be released in 2019, but was delayed due to Psy's attempt to pair the emotionality of a song like "Celeb" with a typical party song like "Champion" to balance the album, a strategy he tried to keep throughout his previous albums. Psy wrote "Forever" at dawn when he feared that he would miss the fullness of his performances and that feeling might not come.

== Music videos ==
The music video for "Celeb" was filmed in three days. Bae Suzy reportedly had practiced the dances intensely for four consecutive days.

The music video for "That That" features Suga of BTS, and has the duo wearing cowboy outfits and dancing in a western themed saloon.

== Track listing ==
| No. | Title | Lyrics | Music | Arrangement | Length |
|---|---|---|---|---|---|
| 1. | "9INTRO" | Psy | Psy; Yoo Gun-hyung; Space One | Yoo; Space One | 2:46 |
| 2. | "That That" (featuring and produced by Suga of BTS) | Psy; Suga | Suga; Psy; El Capitxn | Suga; El Capitxn (Note: Pseudonym for Jang Yi Jeong, who was a member of Kpop band History) | 2:54 |
| 3. | "Celeb" | Zico; Psy | Zico; Psy; Yoo | Yoo | 3:19 |
| 4. | "You Move Me" (감동이야) (featuring Sung Si-kyung) | Psy; White 99; Tablo | Psy; White 99; Duble Sidekick | Yoo; Go Tae-young | 3:40 |
| 5. | "Sleepless" (밤이 깊었네) (Note: The song is a rework of the 2001 song "Oh! What a shiny night (밤이 깊었네)" from the album Poor Hand Love Song by South Korean punk band Crying Nut. Captainrock is the solo stage name of Han Kyung-Rock who is a member of the band.) (featuring Heize) | Captainrock; Psy | Captainrock; Psy | Seo Won-jin | 3:05 |
| 6. | "GANJI" (featuring Jessi) | Psy; Jessi | Psy; Yoo | Yoo | 2:51 |
| 7. | "Now" (이제는) (Note: A cover of the 1984 song, "When the Rain Begins to Fall". The lyrics are based on the 1987 South Korean remake song by the group Seoul Family and it was written by Oh Dong-shik.) (featuring Hwasa) | Oh Dong-shik | Mike Bradley; Stephen Wittmack; Peggy March | Yoo | 3:27 |
| 8. | "Happier" (featuring Crush) | Psy; Crush; General Sound | Psy; Crush; Yoo | Yoo | 4:11 |
| 9. | "Hello Monday" (나의 월요일) | Giriboy | Giriboy; Gleam; Yoo | Yoo | 2:51 |
| 10. | "Everyday" | Psy; VVN; Aura | Psy; Seo won jin; VVN; Aura | Seo won jin; VVN; Aura | 4:36 |
| 11. | "forEVER" (featuring Tablo) | Psy; Tablo | Psy; Aura | Seo won jin; Aura (kimjisun) | 3:28 |
| 12. | "Dear Me" (내일의 나에게) | Psy; Aura (kimjisun) | Psy; VVN; Aura; White 99 | Seo won jin; Aura | 4:06 |
| Total length: | | | | | 41:19 |

== Charts ==
Chart performance for Psy 9th
| Chart (2022) | Peak position |
|---|---|
| Japanese Digital Albums (Oricon) | 20 |
| Japanese Hot Albums (Billboard Japan) | 65 |
| South Korean Albums (Gaon) | 36 |
| US Heatseekers Albums (Billboard) | 2 |
| US Independent Albums (Billboard) | 36 |
| US World Albums (Billboard) | 3 |
