= 30th Seoul Music Awards =

2021 award ceremony

- Date: January 31, 2021
- Venue: Olympic Gymnastics Arena
- Country: South Korea
- Hosted by: Shin Dong-yup; Kim Hee-chul; Choi Soo-young

Highlights
- Most wins: BTS (6 awards)
- Website: seoulmusicawards.com

The 30th Seoul Music Awards, organized by Sports Seoul and broadcast through KBS N and Niconico, on January 31, 2021. The ceremony was held with no on-site audience due to the COVID-19 pandemic.

== Background ==
On January 24, 2021, Shin Dong-yup, Kim Hee-chul and Choi Soo-young was announced as the host of the ceremony.

== Criteria ==
All songs and albums that are eligible to be nominated must be released from January to December 2020.

Category	Online voting	Panelist	Music sales	Album sales
Main Prize (Bonsang)	30%	40%	30%	
Rookie of the Year	30%	40%	30%	
Popularity Award	100% (Korea Only)	N/A		
K-wave Popularity Award	100% (Overseas Only)	N/A		
Trot Award	30%	40%	30%	
Ballad Award	30%	40%	30%	
OST Award	30%	40%	30%	
R&B Hiphop Award	30%	40%	30%	
Best Performance	N/A	100%	N/A	
Band Award	N/A	100%	N/A	
Discovery of the Year	N/A	100%	N/A	

== Winners and nominees ==
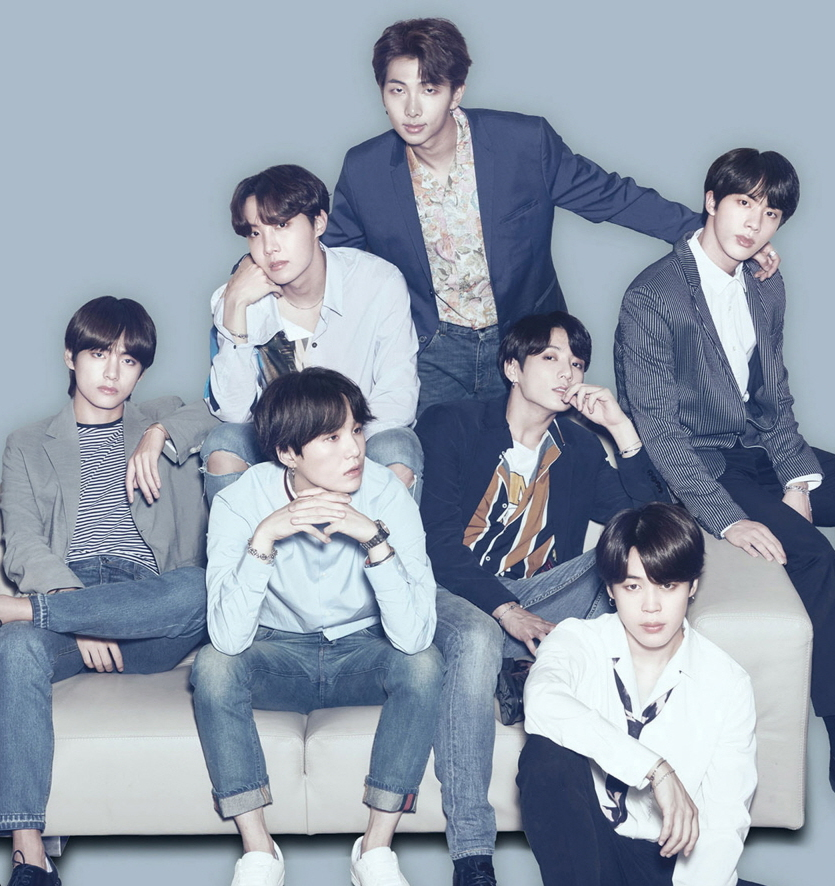
BTS won 6 awards, including the Grand Award (Daesang), Main Award (Bonsang), and Best Song/Album Award.

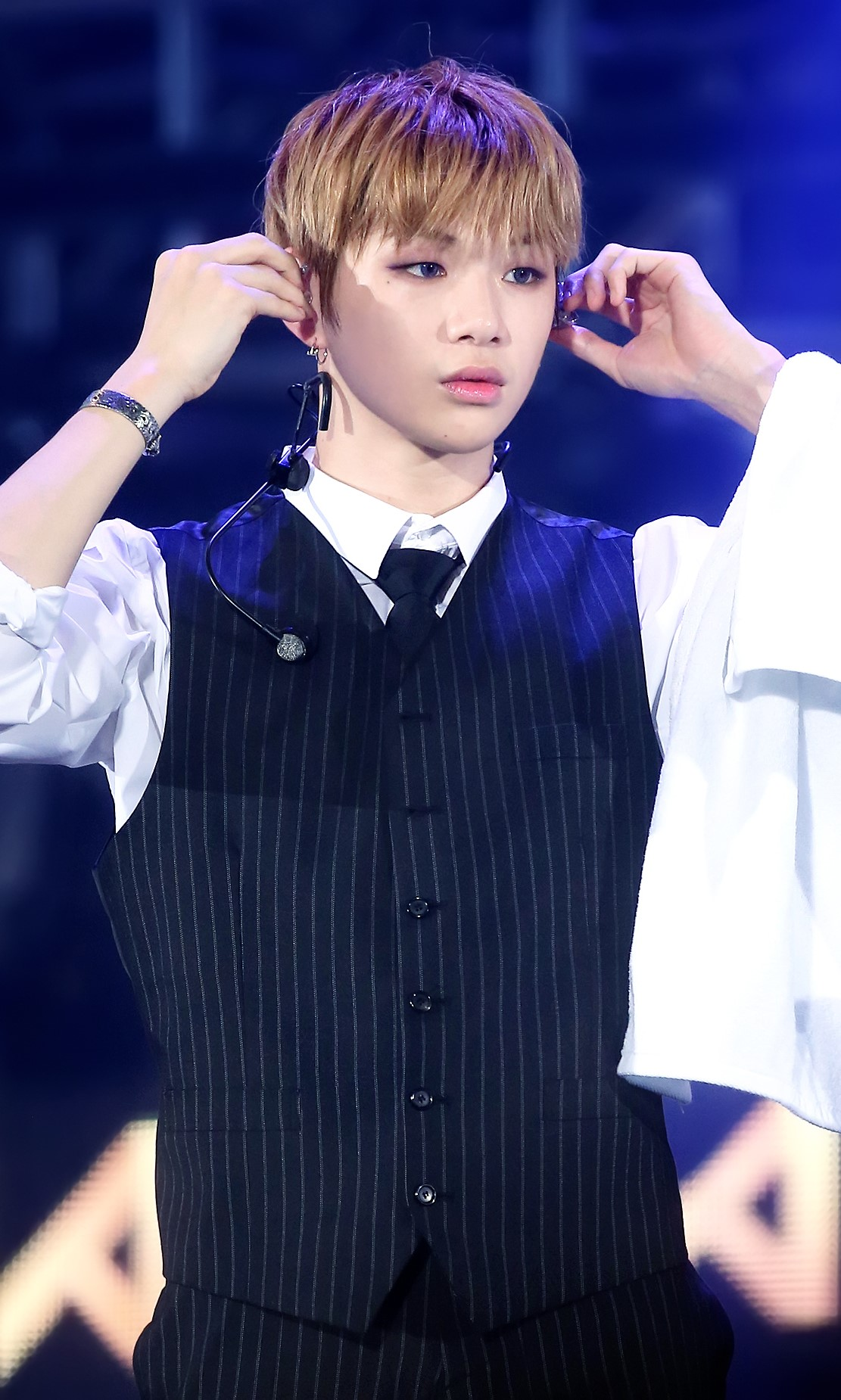
Kang Daniel won 2 awards, including the Main Award (Bonsang) and Fan PD Artist Award.

Winners are listed first and emphasized in bold.

The list of nominees for:

- Fan PD Artist Award were announced on December 1, 2020, through the Idol Champ application.
- WhosFandom Award were announced on December 8, 2020, through the Whofans application.
- remaining categories were announced on December 9, 2020, through the official website.

The online voting for:

- Fan PD Artist Award opened on the Idol Champ application on December 1, 2020, and closed on December 31, 2020.
- WhosFandom Award opened on the WhosFan application on December 15, 2020, and closed on December 18, 2020.
- remaining categories opened on the official website on December 11, 2020, and closed on January 24, 2021.

Grand Award (Daesang)	Main Award (Bonsang)
**BTS**; Ateez; Iz*One; Kang Daniel; Monsta X; NCT 127; NU'EST; Oh My Girl; Seventeen; Stray Kids; Twice; TXT	**Ateez**; **BTS**; **Iz*One**; **Kang Daniel**; **Monsta X**; **NCT 127**; **NU'EST**; **Oh My Girl**; **Seventeen**; **Stray Kids**; **Twice**; **TXT**; List of nominated artists: AB6IX; Apink; April; Astro; Baekhyun; Baek Ji-young; Blackpink; Bol4; Chungha; CIX; Day6; Dreamcatcher; Exo; GFriend; (G)I-dle; Got7; Ha Sung-woon; Hwasa; Itzy; IU; Jessi; Loona; Mamamoo; NCT; NCT Dream; Park Ji-hoon; Park Jin-young; Paul Kim; Pentagon; SF9; Sunmi; Super Junior-D&E; Super Junior-K.R.Y.; Taemin; Taeyeon; The Boyz; Victon; Zico
Best Song Award	Best Album Award
**BTS – "Dynamite"**	**BTS – Map of the Soul: 7**
Rookie of the Year	Best Performance
**Aespa**; **Enhypen**; **Treasure**; Cravity; Drippin; Ghost9; Natty; P1Harmony; Secret Number; STAYC; Weeekly; WEi	**(G)I-DLE**; **The Boyz**
Popularity Award	K-wave Popularity Award
**Lim Young-woong**; List of nominated artists: AB6IX; Aespa; Apink; April; Astro; Ateez; Baekhyun; Baek Ji-young; Blackpink; BOL4; BTS; Chungha; CIX; Cravity; Day6; Dreamcatcher; Drippin; Enhypen; Exo; GFriend; Ghost9; (G)I-DLE; Got7; Ha Sung-woon; Hwasa; Itzy; IU; Iz*One; Jessi; Kang Daniel; Kim Ho-joong; Loona; Mamamoo; Monsta X; Na Hoon-a; Natty; NCT; NCT 127; NCT Dream; NU'EST; Oh My Girl; P1Harmony; Park Ji-hoon; Park Jin-young; Paul Kim; Pentagon; Secret Number; Seventeen; SF9; STAYC; Stray Kids; Sunmi; Super Junior-D&E; Super Junior-K.R.Y.; Taemin; Taeyeon; The Boyz; Treasure; TXT; Twice; Victon; Weeekly; WEi; Young Tak; Zico	**BTS**; List of nominated artists: AB6IX; Aespa; Apink; April; Astro; Ateez; Baekhyun; Baek Ji-young; Blackpink; BOL4; BTS; Chungha; CIX; Cravity; Day6; Dreamcatcher; Drippin; Enhypen; Exo; GFriend; Ghost9; (G)I-DLE; Got7; Ha Sung-woon; Hwasa; Itzy; IU; Iz*One; Jessi; Kang Daniel; Kim Ho-joong; Loona; Mamamoo; Monsta X; Na Hoon-a; Natty; NCT; NCT 127; NCT Dream; NU'EST; Oh My Girl; P1Harmony; Park Ji-hoon; Park Jin-young; Paul Kim; Pentagon; Secret Number; Seventeen; SF9; STAYC; Stray Kids; Sunmi; Super Junior-D&E; Super Junior-K.R.Y.; Taemin; Taeyeon; The Boyz; Treasure; TXT; Twice; Victon; Weeekly; WEi; Young Tak; Zico
Trot Award	Ballad Award
**Lim Young-woong**; Jang Minho; Jang Yoon-jeong; Jo Myung-sup; Jung Dong-won; Kim Ho-joong; Kim Soo-chan; Na Hoon-a; Na Tae-joo; Ryu Ji-kwang; Song Ga-in; Super Five	**Sandeul**; Ailee; Baek Ji-young; Car, the Garden; Huh Gak; Im Chang-jung; Jang Beom-june; Jeon Sang-geun; Kim Jae-hwan; Kyuhyun; Noel; Paul Kim
OST Award	R&B Hiphop Award
**Jo Jung-suk – "Aloha"**; Baekhyun – "My Love"; Baek Yerin – "Here I Am Again"; Gaho – "Start"; Ha Hyun-woo – "Diamond"; Heize and Punch – "Midnight"; IU – "Give You My Heart"; Jeon Mi-do – "I Knew I Love"; Joy – "Introduce me a good person"; Kim Feel – "Someday, The Boy"; Kyuhyun – "Confession Is Not Flashy"; Lee Su-hyun – "In Your Time"; Taeyeon – "Kiss Me"; Urban Zakapa – "Beautiful My Love"; Wheein – "With My Tears"	**Jessi**; Baekhyun; Giriboy; Lee Hi; Loco; Lunch; MakTub; Ovan; Paul Kim; Sik-K, PH-1, Jay Park, Haon; Zico
Band Award	Discovery of the Year
**Leenalchi**	**Itzy**
Fan PD Artist Award	WhosFandom Award
**Kang Daniel**; AB6IX; Astro; Ateez; Blackpink; BTS; Dreamcatcher; Exo; GFriend; Got7; Ha Sung-woon; Kim Jae-hwan; Loona; Monsta X; NCT 127; NCT Dream; NU'EST; Ong Seong-wu; Park Ji-hoon; Pentagon; Secret Number; Seventeen; SF9; Shinee; Stray Kids; Super Junior; Tomorrow X Together; Treasure; Twice; WayV	**BTS**; Ateez; Blackpink; Dreamcatcher; Exo; Got7; Mamamoo; Monsta X; NCT; Red Velvet; Seventeen; Stray Kids; Tomorrow X Together; Treasure; The Boyz; Twice

== Presenters and performers ==
=== Presenters ===
Name of the presenter and the award they presented
No.	Name(s)	Presented
1	Yoo Yeon-seok	Main Award (Bonsang)
2	Kim Dong-wan (Shinhwa)	Main Award (Bonsang)
3	Yoon Eun-hye	Best Song Award
3	Yoon Eun-hye	Best Album Award
4	Son Dam-bi	Main Award (Bonsang)

=== Performers ===
Name of the performer and the song(s) they performed
No.	Name(s)	Performed	Ref.
1	Hyunjae (The Boyz), Eunbi (Iz*One), Jongho (Ateez), Lia (Itzy), Seunghee (Oh My Girl) & Seungmin (Stray Kids)	"Once in a Lifetime" by Shinhwa	
2	Stray Kids	"Back Door"	
3	Leenalchi	"You Know Who I Am?"	
4	Jessi	"Star"	
4	Jessi	"Nunu Nana"	
5	The Boyz	"The Stealer"	
6	Itzy	"Wannabe"	
6	Itzy	"Not Shy"	
7	Aespa	"Black Mamba"	
8	Enhypen	"Given-Taken"	
9	Treasure	"Slow Motion"	
9	Treasure	"I Love You (Mellow Mood)"	
9	Treasure	"My Treasure"	
10	Kang Daniel	"2U"	
10	Kang Daniel	"Who U Are"	
11	Iz*One	"Really Like You"	
11	Iz*One	"Sequence"	
11	Iz*One	"Panorama"	
11	Iz*One	"Slow Journey"	
12	(G)I-dle	"Hwaa"	
13	Ateez	"Utopia"	
13	Ateez	"Inception"	
14	Tomorrow X Together	"We Lost The Summer"	
14	Tomorrow X Together	"Blue Hour"	
15	Oh My Girl	"Secret Garden"	
15	Oh My Girl	"Remember Me"	
15	Oh My Girl	"Dolphin"	
15	Oh My Girl	"Nonstop"	
16	Lim Young-woong	"Trust in Me"	
17	NU'EST	"I'm in Trouble"	
17	NU'EST	"Moon Dance"	
17	NU'EST	"Drive"	
18	Monsta X	"Last Carnival"	
18	Monsta X	"Night View"	
18	Monsta X	"Gasoline"	
18	Monsta X	"Love Killa"	
19	Twice	"More & More"	
19	Twice	"I Can't Stop Me"	
20	Seventeen	"Fallin' Flower"	
20	Seventeen	"All My Love"	
20	Seventeen	"Home;Run"	
