= That That =

Single by Psy featuring Suga

from the album Psy 9th
- Language: Korean, English
- Released: April 29, 2022
- Length: 2:54
- Label: School Boy; Republic; P Nation
- Composers: Psy; Suga; El Capitxn
- Lyricists: Psy; Suga
- Producers: Psy; Suga; El Capitxn

Psy singles chronology
"I Luv It" (2017)	"That That" (2022)	"Celeb" (2022)

Suga singles chronology
"Blueberry Eyes" (2020)	"That That" (2022)	"Lilith (Diablo IV Anthem)" (2023)

Music video
- "That That" on YouTube

"That That" is a song recorded by South Korean singer Psy and South Korean rapper Suga of BTS for Psy's ninth studio album Psy 9th. The song was written and produced by Psy and Suga. It was released for digital download and streaming on April 29, 2022, as the album's lead single by School Boy, Republic, and P Nation.

== Background and release ==
On April 26, 2022, "That That", was announced as the lead single for Psy's eighth studio album, Psy 9th. The song was written and produced by Psy and Suga. Mixing was handled by Tony Maserati, while mastering was done by Sterling Sound's Chris Gehringer.

The song was released for digital download and streaming by P Nation on April 29, 2022.

== Music video ==
The music video for "That That" was filmed on a sandy beach in Incheon in mid-March. According to Psy, the weather was cold and rainy, causing some difficulties during filming, as the sand became muddy and made their feet sink into the ground. It garnered more than 30 million views within 24 hours of its release and 100 million views within a week of its release.

== Critical reception ==
"That That" was ranked at number 20 on Billboard's list of The 25 Best K-pop Songs of 2022 and number 10 on Paris Match's list of The 10 best K-pop releases from 2022.

== Accolades ==
Awards and nominations for "That That"
Organization	Year	Category	Result	Ref.
Circle Chart Music Awards	2023	Global Digital Music – April	Nominated	
Genie Music Awards	2022	Song of the Year	Nominated	
Golden Disc Awards	2023	Digital Bonsang	Won	
MAMA Awards	2022	Best Collaboration	Won	
MAMA Awards	2022	Best Dance Performance – Solo	Won	
MAMA Awards	2022	Song of the Year	Nominated	
Melon Music Awards	2022	Song of the Year	Nominated	

Music program awards (7 total)
Program	Date	Ref.
Show Champion	May 11, 2022	
Show Champion	May 18, 2022	
Inkigayo	May 15, 2022	
Inkigayo	May 22, 2022	
Inkigayo	May 29, 2022	
M Countdown	May 19, 2022	
Show! Music Core	May 21, 2022	

== Credits and personnel ==
Credits adapted from the album's liner notes.

Studio

- P Nation – recording, digital editing
- Klang Studio – mixing
- Sterling Sound – mastering

Personnel

- P Nation – executive producer
- Psy – producer, vocals, lyrics, composition, background vocals
- Suga – producer, vocals, lyrics, composition, arrangement, background vocals, keyboard, synthesizer
- El Capitxn – producer, composition, arrangement, keyboard, synthesizer
- Kyaku (Vendors) – synthesizer
- Zenur (Vendors) – guitar
- Lee Ki-ho – recording, digital editing
- Hong Soo-yeon – recording
- Tony Maserati – mixing
- Koo Jong-pil – mixing
- Kang Sun-young – mixing assistant
- Chris Gehringer – mastering

== Charts ==
=== Weekly charts ===
Chart performance for "That That"
Chart (2022)	Peak position
Australia (ARIA)	49
Canada Hot 100 (Billboard)	41
Global 200 (Billboard)	5
Hungary (Single Top 40)	6
India (Billboard)	13
Indonesia (Billboard)	10
Japan Hot 100 (Billboard)	14
Japan Combined Singles (Oricon)	32
Malaysia (Billboard)	5
Mexico Ingles Airplay (Billboard)	19
Netherlands (Dutch Global Top 40)	2
New Zealand Hot Singles (RMNZ)	7
Peru (Billboard)	20
Philippines (Billboard)	15
Singapore (RIAS)	6
Singapore (Billboard)	5
South Korea (Gaon)	1
South Korea (Billboard)	1
Switzerland (Schweizer Hitparade)	98
Taiwan (Billboard)	15
UK Singles (Official Charts)	61
US Billboard Hot 100	80
US World Digital Song Sales (Billboard)	1
Vietnam (Vietnam Hot 100)	1

=== Monthly charts ===
Monthly chart performance
Chart (2022)	Position
South Korea (Gaon)	1

=== Year-end charts ===
Year-end chart performance
Chart (2022)	Position
Global Excl. US (Billboard)	198
Japan Download Songs (Billboard Japan)	68
South Korea (Circle)	8

Year-end chart performance
Chart (2023)	Position
South Korea (Circle)	130

== Certifications ==
Certifications
Region	Certification	Certified units/sales
Streaming
South Korea (KMCA)	Platinum	100,000,000^{†}
^{†} Streaming-only figures based on certification alone.
