= Down (Jessi song) =

2018 single by Jessi

Single by Jessi
- Released: July 6, 2018
- Genre: Tropical house; hip hop
- Length: 3:01
- Label: YMC Entertainment
- Songwriters: Jessi; Double K; Gray; Danny Chung

Jessi singles chronology
"Gucci" (2017)	"Down" (2018)	"Who Dat B" (2019)

Music video
- "Down" on YouTube

"Down" is a single by American singer-songwriter and rapper Jessi. It was released on July 6, 2018 by YMC Entertainment as her last release with the company, and distributed by LOEN Entertainment.

== Background and release ==
"Down " – Full music video

The rapper announced the single by posting several teaser videos in July, the first being released on July 4, 2018, on the YMC Entertainment YouTube channel. The single was released on July 6, 2018, by YMC Entertainment, as her last release with the company following her contract expiration with the agency in October 2018, the single's music video was released on the same day.

On the single's release day, Jessi posted scenes from the music video on her personal Instagram account and wrote that she is "Breaking Korea's societal norms" in the music video. The music video was Directed by Korlio (August Frogs).

== Composition ==
The single was written by Jessi, Double K, Gray, and Danny Chung. "Down" is a Hip-hop and Tropical house song.

== Controversy ==
The single caused controversy in conservative South Korea due to its music video, which was filmed at the beach and featured Jessi wearing a bikini and twerking. Replying to her critics, Jessi stated, "My new song has a tropical vibe, so I wore swimsuits often; but because it doesn't fit with the Korean standards, I received a lot of hate ... I'm okay now. I hope all women live with confidence. I believe that being able to show confidence in your body is a good thing".

== Live performances ==
To promote the single, Jessi performed in, The Show July 10, 2018, Show Champion on July 11, Music Bank on July 13, Show! Music Core on July 14, Inkigayo on July 15, and Simply K-Pop on July 27.
