= Uptown (band) =

South Korean hip hop group

Uptown 업타운
- Origin: South Korea
- Genres: Korean hip hop
- Years active: 1997–2000, 2006–2010
- Members: Chris Jung (1996-present); Carlos Galvan (1997-2006); Steve Kim (1997-2006); Tasha Reid (1997-2000); Jessica H.O (2006); Maniac (2009-2010); Snacky Chan (2009-2010); Swings (2009)

Uptown (Korean: 업타운) was a pioneering South Korean hip hop group that formed in 1997. The group's four original members were Chris Jung, Carlos Galvan, Steve Kim and Tasha Reid.

The group underwent several line-up changes during the 90s and disbanded in 2000 following drug charges against Jung, Galvan, and Kim. When Reid left Uptown to pursue a solo career, the group made a comeback without her in 2006 with the album Testimony. Teenage rapper Jessica H. O. joined the group for the album. Jung was the only remaining original member on the group's 2009 album, New Era, which featured new members Maniac, Snacky Chan, and Swings. Uptown has been inactive since its 2010 album Surprise!

== Original members ==
- Chris Jung
- Carlos Ricardo Galvan
- Steve Kim
- Tasha Reid

=== Other members ===
- Jessica H.O.
- Maniac
- Snacky Chan
- Swings

== Discography ==
- 1997: Represent
- 1997: Represented...Now Believe
- 1998: Mutual Best
- 1998: Chapter 3 in History
- 1998: Absolute Power
- 1998: Verbal Medication
- 2000: History
- 2006: Testimony
- 2009: New Era
- 2010: Surprise!

== Uptown 3000 ==
Uptown members Carlos Galvan and Steve Kim formed a duo called Uptown 3000 in 2002. The duo was signed to a label in Atlanta, Georgia and was meant to break into the U.S. hip hop market. However, they released only one album, 2003's Same Book Different Chapter, before disbanding.

== Awards ==
Year	Award-Giving Body	Category	Work	Result
2006	Mnet Asian Music Awards	Best Hip-Hop Performance	"Go To Hong Kong"	Nominated
