= Seoul National University High School =

Public high school in Seoul, South Korea

Seoul National University High School 서울대학교 사범대학 부설고등학교

Location
- 6 Wolgok-ro, Seongbuk-gu, Seoul; South Korea
- Coordinates: 37.5928°N 127.0378°E

Information
- Type: Public
- Established: 1946
- Principal: Lee Ki-Seong (이기성)
- Faculty: 109
- Gender: Boys and Girls
- Enrolment: 940 (as of 11 Mar 2015)
- Campus size: 36,338 m^{2}
- Website: http://www.snu.hs.kr/

Seoul National University High School is a public high school attached to Seoul National University located in Jongam-dong, Seongbuk-gu, Seoul.

== History ==
The school was founded on September 1, 1946, as Seoul National University Middle School (서울대학교 사범대학 부속중학교), serving Grades 7 to 12. It then split into a separate middle school and high school on September 1, 1951. The school moved to its location at Jongam-dong on November 6, 1971, and changed its name to Seoul National University High School on March 1, 2001.

Principal Lee Ki-seong was appointed on September 1, 2011, as the 16th principal of the school. As of 5 February 2015, 25,741 students had graduated from the school.

== Notable alumni ==
- 김호진 Kim Ho-jin - Actor
- 김두성 Kim Doo-Seong - Civil servant
- 전상우 Jeon Sang-woo - Civil servant
- 김영길 Kim Young-gil - Spaceship engineer
- 윤석남 Yoon Seok-nam - Artist
- 어윤배 Uh Yoon-bae - 8th and 9th President of Soongsil University
- 이기준 Lee Gi-jun - Seoul National University professor
- 장수길 Jang Su-gil - Lawyer under Kim & Chang
- 장영희 Chang Young-hee - Professor, translator, scholar, essayist
- 전광우 Jun Kwang-woo - Professor at Yonsei University's Graduate School of Economic
- 이수빈 Lee Soo-bin - Owner of Samsung Lions
- 이건희 Lee Kun-hee - Chairman of Samsung
- 이영회 Lee Young-hee
- 성기학 Seong Gi-hak - President of Korea Federation of Textile Industries
- 이희범 Lee Hee-beom - Adviser of LG International Corp.
- 송필호 Song Pil-hon - President of the Korea Newspapers Association and vice-chairman of Joongang Ilbo board of directors
- 오권용 Kwon Oh-yong - Vice-president of SK Group
- 엄창섭 Uhm Chang-seob -
- 김도현 Kim Do-hyun - Mayor of Gangseo-gu from 2006.07.01—2007.10.26
- 홍사덕 Hong Sa-deok - Former member of the National Assembly
- 이범관 Lee Beom-gwan - Former member of the National Assembly
- 김영순 Kim Young-soon - Mayor of Songpa-gu from 2006.07.01—2010.06.30
