= Nuna (EP) =

EP by Jessi
- Released: July 30, 2020
- Genres: K-pop; hip hop
- Length: 19:24
- Labels: P Nation; Kakao M

Jessi chronology
| Kill Bill 2nd Live: Jessi (2019) | Nuna (2020) | P.M.S (2025) |

Singles from Nuna
- 1. "Who Dat B" Released: September 23, 2019; 2. "Drip" Released: November 2, 2019; 3. "Nunu Nana" Released: July 30, 2020; 4. "Numb" Released: August 14, 2020

Nuna (stylized in all caps) is the second extended play (promoted as her third (Note: Jessi's debut release, 'Get Up' (2005), was promoted as a single album upon its release, and 'Un2verse' (2017) was promoted as her debut EP. Both releases are now presumably considered EPs by the singer and her label.)) by Korean-American rapper and singer Jessi. It was released on July 30, 2020 by P-Nation and distributed by Kakao M. It consists of six songs, including the previously released singles "Who Dat B" and "Drip", and the title track "Nunu Nana". This marks her first and only album release under P Nation and her first album in almost three years, following Un2verse in 2017.

== Background and release ==
Following the expiration of her recording contract with YMC Entertainment, under which she released her first EP Un2verse in July 2017, Jessi signed with Psy's self-formed record label P-Nation in January 2019. Her first release under the label, the single "Who Dat B" was released in September 2019, followed by the Jay Park collaboration "Drip" that November.

The EP was released on July 30, 2020, through several music portals including Melon and Apple Music.

== Promotion ==
=== Singles ===
"Who Dat B" was released as a standalone digital single on September 23, 2019 as her first release under P-Nation. The hip-hop and K-rap single, noted as a "bad girl anthem" driven by "biting lyrics and an infectious beat," peaked at number 68 on the Billboard Korea K-pop Hot 100 and at number eight on the Billboard World Digital Songs Sales chart. The music video for the single was released to her YouTube channel in conjunction with the single release. As of February 2021, it has 18.94 million views.

"Drip" featuring Korean-American rapper Jay Park, was released as her second standalone single on November 2, 2019. The trap single is sung entirely in English and peaked at number 16 on the World Digital Songs Sales chart. The music video was released to her YouTube channel in conjunction with the single. As of February 2021, it has 11.43 million views.

"Nunu Nana" (눈누난나, stylized in all caps) was released as the EP's third single on July 30, 2020 alongside the release of the EP itself. A "hip-hop track with pop elements," the single became a commercial success in South Korea. "Nunu Nana" peaked at number two on the Gaon Digital Chart, becoming her first chart entry since "Gucci" peaked at number 99 in 2017, as well as her highest-charting song to date. The song also peaked at number two on the Billboard Korea K-pop Hot 100 and at number 17 on the World Digital Songs Sales chart. The music video, which stars South Korean musician Lee Hyori, was posted on July 30 and has 111.2 million views as of May 2021, making it her first music video to surpass 100 million views.

"Numb" was released as the final single from the EP on August 14, 2020. The music video was released that day and has 4.92 million views as of February 2021.

== Track listing ==
Digital download
| No. | Title | Lyrics | Music | Arrangement | Length |
|---|---|---|---|---|---|
| 1. | "Nunu Nana" (눈누난나) | Jessi; Psy; Illson; PENOMECO; DAMIAN; JohnJohn; Jaero | Yoo Gun-hyung; PENOMECO; Jeon Byeong-Il | Yoo Gun-hyung; Jeon Byeong-Il; Kang Pilseong | 3:15 |
| 2. | "Star" | Illson; Jaero; Jessi | Yoo Gun-hyung; Jessi; Jaero | Yoo Gun-hyung; Kang Pilseong | 3:01 |
| 3. | "Put It On Ya" (featuring KARD's BM and nafla) | Jessi; nafla; BM; JohnJohn; Jaero | CUZD; JohnJohn | CUZD; JohnJohn | 2:50 |
| 4. | "Numb" | Emile Ghantous; Angel Taylor; Jessi; Peter Chun; Aurora Pfeiffer | Emile Ghantous; Angel Taylor; Jessi; Peter Chun; Aurora Pfeiffer | Emile Ghantous; Angel Taylor; Jessi; Peter Chun; Aurora Pfeiffer | 3:29 |
| 5. | "Who Dat B" | Double K; Jessi; Brian Lee | Brian Lee; Jessie Lauren Foutz | Brian Lee; A-$Sharp; Kang Pilseong | 3:17 |
| 6. | "Drip" (featuring Jay Park) | Jessi; Jay Park; JohnJohn | Jessi; JohnJohn; CUZD | JohnJohn; CUZD | 3:32 |
| Total length: | | | | | 19:24 |

== Charts ==
=== Singles ===
==== "Who Dat B" ====
| Chart (2019) | Peak position |
|---|---|
| South Korea (Billboard Korea K-Pop Hot 100) | 68 |
| US World Digital Songs Sales (Billboard) | 8 |

==== "Drip" (featuring Jay Park) ====
| Chart (2019) | Peak position |
|---|---|
| US World Digital Songs Sales (Billboard) | 16 |

==== "Nunu Nana" (눈누난나) ====
Weekly charts

| Chart (2020) | Peak position |
|---|---|
| Singapore (RIAS) | 17 |
| South Korea (Gaon) | 2 |
| South Korea (Billboard Korea K-Pop Hot 100) | 2 |
| US World Digital Songs Sales (Billboard) | 17 |

Year-end charts

| Chart (2020) | Peak position |
|---|---|
| South Korea (Gaon) | 49 |

== Accolades ==
| Year | Organization | Award | Nominated work | Result | Ref. |
|---|---|---|---|---|---|
| 2020 | Mnet Asian Music Awards | Best Dance Performance – Solo | "Nunu Nana" | Nominated | |
| 2020 | Mnet Asian Music Awards | Song of the Year | "Nunu Nana" | Nominated | |
| 2020 | Mnet Asian Music Awards | Favorite Dance Performance – Female Solo | "Nunu Nana" | Won | |
