= Un2verse =

EP by Jessi
- Released: July 13, 2017
- Genre: K-rap
- Length: 16:47
- Label: YMC; LOEN

Jessi chronology
Get Up (2005)	Un2verse (2017)	Kill Bill 2nd Live: Jessi (2019)

Singles from Un2verse
- 1. "Gucci" Released: July 13, 2017

Un2verse (pronounced "universe") is the debut extended play by Korean American rapper and singer Jessi. It was released on July 13, 2017, by YMC Entertainment and distributed by Kakao M, formerly known as LOEN Entertainment. It consists of five songs, with all five being written by the singer and two produced by her. "Gucci" was released as the title track.

The EP peaked at number 31 on the Gaon Album Chart and at number four on the Billboard World Albums chart.

== Background and release ==
On June 22, 2017, it was announced that the rapper and singer will be making a comeback on July. It was stated that the rapper finished the recording process and was in final stages. Since this was the first EP in more than 12 years of career, Jessi showed intentions of being more involved in the process.

On July 2, the rapper shared through her personal Instagram account that her upcoming release will be an extended play called Un2verse, setting the release date to July 13 at 6 p.m. KST. A day later, she explained the reason behind the EP name as "the universe is everything, all existing matter, space, and time. The un2verse is my everything. Who I am, where I've been, and where we can go". She continued using her account revealing the track list on July 7. It consists of 5 songs, including the title track named "Gucci".

The EP was digitally released on July 13, 2017, through several music portals, including MelOn in South Korea, and iTunes and Spotify for the global market. A physical release is expected on July 21.

== Promotion ==
=== Live performances ===
The rapper held her first comeback stage on Mnet's M Countdown on July 13, 2017, performing the song "Gucci". The song name was changed to "Why" (Hangul: 굳이; RR: gud-i), in order to avoid copyright infringement on broadcast television. She continued on KBS's Music Bank on July 14, MBC's Show! Music Core on July 15 and SBS's Inkigayo on July 16.

=== Single ===
"Gucci" was released as the title track in conjunction with the EP on July 13. On July 9, the first music video teaser was released. The full music video was released on July 13. The song debuted at number 99 on the Gaon Digital Chart, on the chart issue dated July 9–15, 2017, with 22,251 downloads sold.

== Commercial performance ==
Un2verse debuted and peaked at number 31 on the Gaon Album Chart, on the chart issue dated July 16–22, 2017. In its second week, the EP fell to number 41. The EP also debuted at number 4 on the US World Albums chart, on the week ending August 5, 2017. The EP placed at number 64 on the Gaon Album Chart for the month of July 2017, with 1,091 physical copies sold.

== Track listing ==
No.	Title	Lyrics	Music	Arrangement	Length
1.	"Gucci"	Jessi; Swings; Antonia Macklin Jr.	Antonia Macklin Jr. "Anti pop"; Stereotypes	Stereotypes	2:55
2.	"Boing" (feat. Changmo)	Jessi; Kam Parker; CJ; Changmo	Kam Parker; Jonathan Yip; Jeremy Reeves; Ray Romulus; Ray McCullough	Stereotypes	3:07
3.	"My Walk" (걸음걸이; geol-eumgeol-i; feat.Year of the OX)	Jessi; Year of the OX; Black Wave	Black Wave	Antik	3:37
4.	"Spirit Animal"	Jessi; Dumbfoundead	Jessi; Dumbfoundead	Diego Ave; Famous Bro; Hymax	3:00
5.	"Arrived"	Jessi; Dumbfoundead	Jessi; Dumbfoundead	Big Banana	4:04
Total length:					16:47

== Charts ==
Chart (2017)	Peak position
South Korea (Gaon Album Chart)	31
US World Albums (Billboard)	4

== Release history ==
Region	Date	Format	Label
South Korea	July 13, 2017	Digital download	YMC Entertainment, LOEN Entertainment
Worldwide	July 13, 2017	Digital download	YMC Entertainment, LOEN Entertainment
South Korea	July 13, 2017	Digital download	YMC Entertainment, LOEN Entertainment
South Korea	July 21, 2017	CD	YMC Entertainment, LOEN Entertainment
