= Seoul Foreign Language High School =

- Hangeul: 서울외국어고등학교
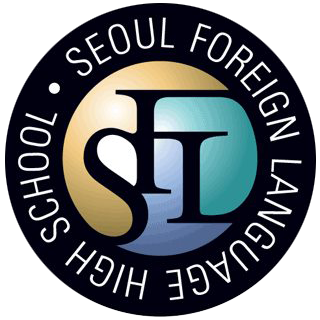

Location
- Dobong-gu, Seoul; South Korea
- Coordinates: 37°38′44″N 127°03′08″E

Information
- Type: Private
- Motto: Honesty, Diligence, Responsibility (정직, 근면, 책임)
- Established: 1993
- Principal: Kim Sang Gyum (김상겸)
- Deputy Principal: Lee Sang Joon
- Faculty: approx. 87
- Enrolment: approx. 1,050
- Tree: Yew
- Flower: Rose
- Website: http://www.sfl.hs.kr

Seoul Foreign Language High School (Korean: 서울외국어고등학교; Hanja: 서울外國語高等學校) is private preparatory school located in Seoul. Classified as a Foreign Language High School under the Ministry of Education, Science, and Technology's categorization of Special Purpose High Schools, Seoul FLHS's curriculum is centered on the specialized education of various European and Asian languages. Seoul Foreign Language High School is the sixth foreign language high school to be established in South Korea.

The school's primary language of instruction is Korean.

Like most schools in South Korea, SFLHS starts its school year in March, starts its second semester in September, and ends the school year in February.

== Admissions ==
The school receives applications from around the country. Students can gain admission to Seoul Foreign Language High School by demonstrating ability in a variety of areas, but the most common way students are accepted is through SFLHS's own admissions test, which includes written exams and an interview.

Seoul Foreign Language High School has its own admission tests. Usually only the top 3% of middle school students can get an offer from this school. SFLHS students choose one primary language as a major upon application from English, German, Chinese, French, or Japanese to study during their three years at SFLHS. Korean and English are mandatory subjects, regardless of which focus language students choose when entering the school.
