= Jun Kwang-woo =

South Korean businessman (born 1949)

Jun Kwang-Woo
- 전광우
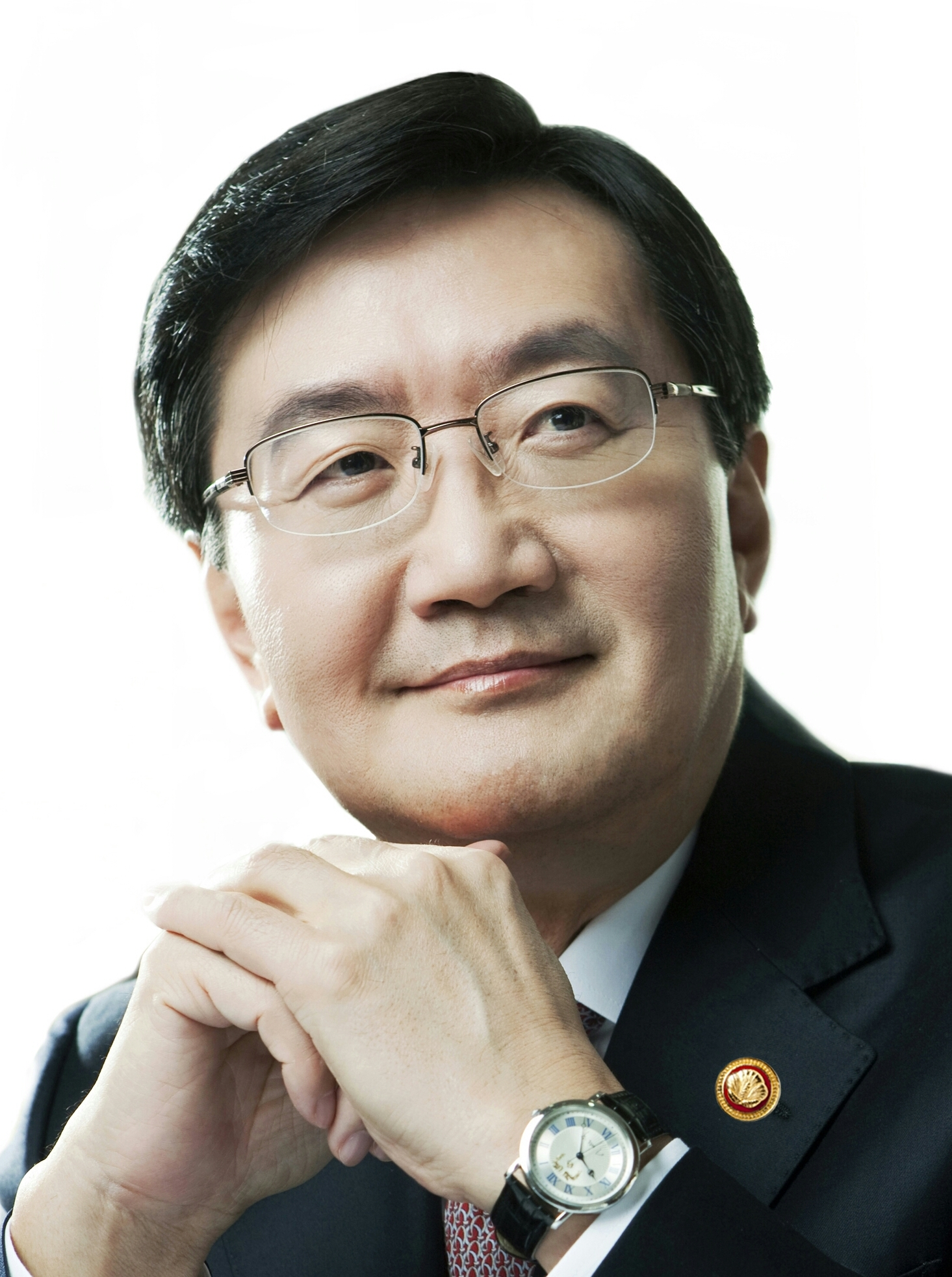
- Born: May 7, 1949 (age 77); Seoul, South Korea
- Education: Seoul National University
- Occupation: Chairman of Institute for Global Economics

Korean name
- Hangul: 전광우
- Hanja: 全光宇
- RR: Jeon Gwangu
- MR: Chŏn Kwangu

Jun Kwang-Woo (Korean: 전광우; born May 7, 1949) served in 2009–2013 as chairman and chief executive officer of the National Pension Service (NPS) of Korea, the 7,000-member public organization with over KW900 trillion (approximate US$800billion) fund, one of the world's largest in terms of total assets, and led the NPS to become a global force during his tenure. After serving as a distinguished professor at Yonsei University's Graduate School of Economics, he is currently chairman of the Institute for Global Economics (IGE).

In 2008 and 2009, Jun served as founding chairman (minister) of Financial Services Commission (FSC), the cabinet post in charge of financial policy and supervision, and played a leading role in successfully coping with the 2008 financial crisis. He was also elected chairman of the Asia-Pacific Regional Committee of the International Organization of Securities Commissions (IOSCO), the first time for a Korean top regulator.

His previous positions include Korea's ambassador for international finance; chairman of the board of POSCO, a global steel group; chairman of Deloitte Korea; group vice chairman of Woori Financial Holdings; president of the Korea Center for International Finance. After serving as a finance professor at Michigan State University, he worked for the World Bank for more than 12 years in various capacities. At the height of the 1997 Asian financial crisis, he returned home as special advisor to deputy prime minister.

Jun is an author of numerous articles and books, including Beyond the Crisis (2010). He has been featured in interviews or columns appearing in The Financial Times, The Wall Street Journal, The Economist, Bloomberg, CNBC, among others, and has been a frequent invited speaker at international conferences.

He received his BA in economics from Seoul National University, and MA in economics and MBA and Ph.D. in finance from Indiana University. He has completed the Executive Program at Harvard Business School and the AMP from the Wharton School, the University of Pennsylvania. He is the inaugural recipient of Indiana University's Distinguished International Alumni Award (2013).
