= Jessi (musician) =

American rapper and singer (born 1988)

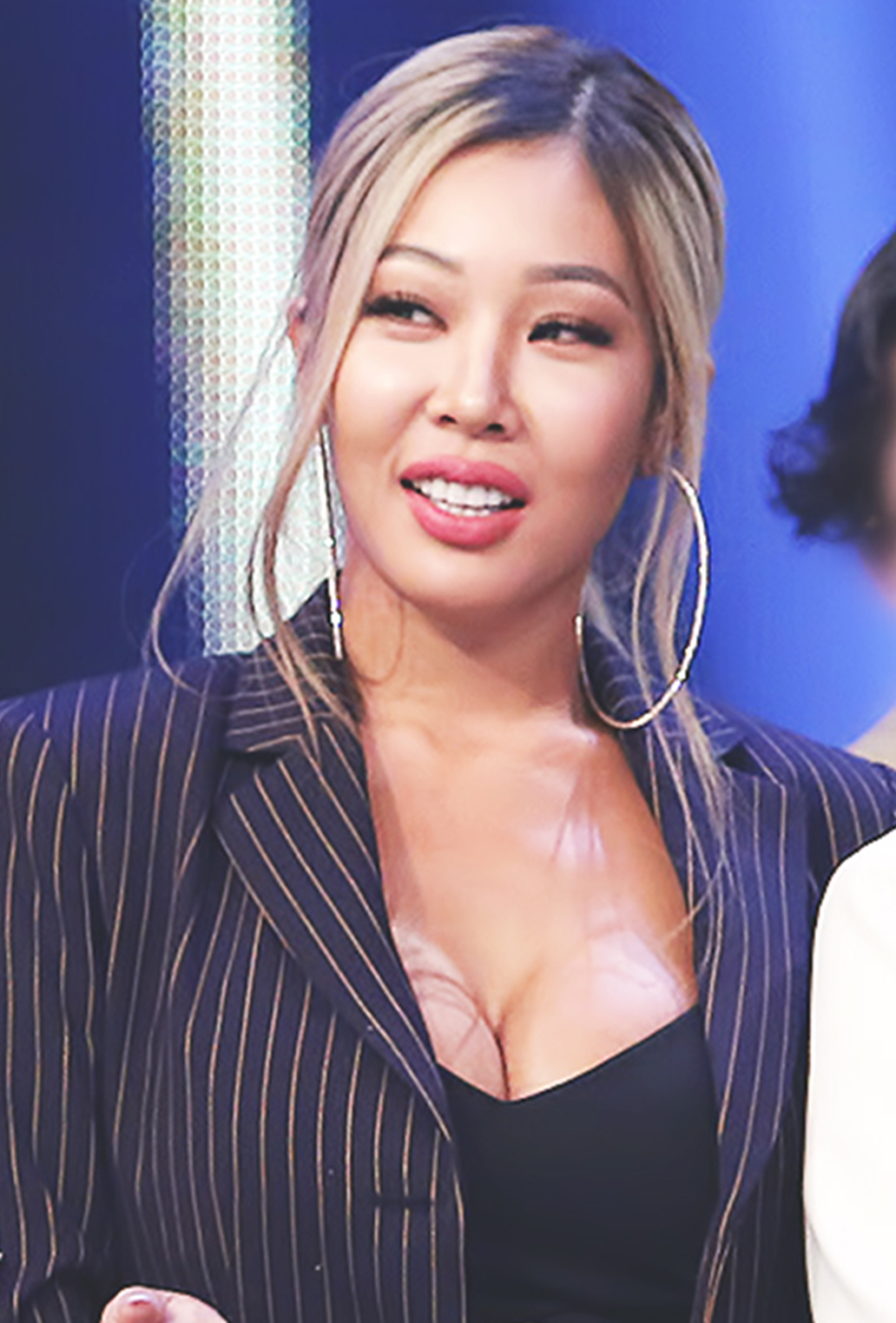
- Jessi in 2016
- Born: Jessica Hyunju Ho; December 17, 1988 (age 37); New York City, United States
- Occupations: Rapper; singer; songwriter; television presenter
- Musical career
- Genres: Korean hip-hop; hip-hop; R&B
- Instrument: Vocals
- Years active: 2005–2009; 2014–present
- Labels: Doremi; YMC; P Nation; More Vision; DOD; UNNI
- Formerly of: Uptown; Jay Park; Lucky J; Sister's Slam Dunk; Refund Sisters
- Website: Official website

Korean name
- Hangul: 호현주
- RR: Ho Hyeonju
- MR: Ho Hyŏnju

Jessica Hyunju Ho (Korean: 제시 현주 호; born December 17, 1988), known mononymously as Jessi (Korean: 제시), is an American rapper and singer based in South Korea. She was born in New York City and raised in New Jersey. She moved to Seoul, South Korea, at the age of 15. Jessi originally debuted in South Korea in 2005 and briefly joined the Korean hip-hop group Uptown in 2006. After a hiatus, she returned to music as part of the hip-hop trio Lucky J and as a soloist under YMC Entertainment, until the group's disbandment in 2016. She then signed with Psy's record label P Nation in 2019 as its first artist, where she continued her solo career until her departure from the label in 2022. Several of her solo and collaborative singles have been commercially successful, with five Top 10 entries in the Gaon Digital Chart, including her highest-charting solo single "Nunu Nana" and the chart-topping single "Don't Touch Me" as part of the Refund Sisters.

Jessi is a prominent presence in Korean variety programs. She achieved mainstream popularity as part of the first season of Mnet hip hop competition show Unpretty Rapstar, where she placed second. She also served as a judge in competition shows High School Rapper and Cap-teen, as well as a host in her own YouTube talk show with SBS, Jessi's Showterview. She is also notable for her regular appearances in programs with comedian Yoo Jae-suk, such as guest appearances in Running Man and Hangout with Yoo, as well as being a series regular in Sixth Sense.

== Career ==
=== 2005–2014: Early career and Lucky J ===
Jessi made her debut with single album Get Up in 2005. In 2006, the hip hop group Uptown featured her in their album Testimony, replacing their original vocalist Yoon Mi-rae. Jessi's second single album, entitled "The Rebirth", was released in January 2009. After the release, she took a break from music, and left Korea to return to America.

In 2014, after a 5-year hiatus, Jessi returned as a member of hip-hop trio Lucky J with rapper J'Kyun and vocalist J-Yo. Lucky J debuted with the digital single "Can You Hear Me" under YMC Entertainment in July of that year.

=== 2015–2018: Television roles and Un2verse ===
From January to March 2015, Jessi was part of the first season of Unpretty Rapstar, a spin-off of the program Show Me the Money. Unpretty Rapstar is a female rapper survival program, where contestants compete for the chance to be featured on tracks in a compilation album. Jessi was chosen as the second-place winner of the show by audience vote. After her appearance on Unpretty Rapstar, Jessi was featured in JYP's single "Who's Your Mama?" and its music video, which were both released in April 2015. The track topped all nine major music charts in Korea as soon as it was released. She released her first ever solo rap single, "Ssenunni", on September 15. On October 16, 2015, Jessi performed in the United States for the first time at the Belasco Theater in Los Angeles with hip-hop duo Mighty Mouth.

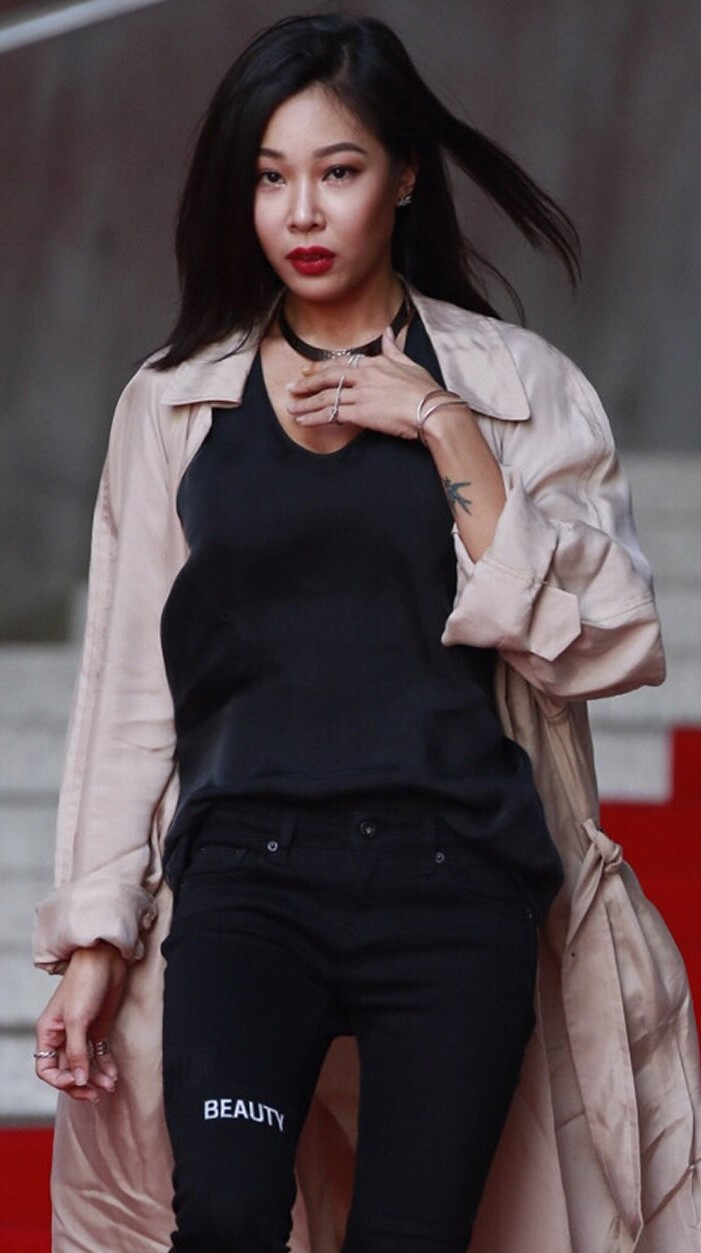
Jessi at the 2016 Seoul Fashion Week

In 2016, Jessi was cast in Sister's Slam Dunk. In 2017, Jessi released another rap single, "Gucci" from her first mini-album, entitled Un2verse, both of which released on July 13. On July 6, 2018, she released a single titled "Down".

=== 2019–2022: P Nation and Nuna ===
Jessi's contract with YMC Entertainment ended in October 2018, and in January 2019, she signed a contract with Psy's record label P Nation. Her first single under the label, "Who Dat B," was released on September 23, 2019. "Who Dat B" peaked at number eight on the World Digital Songs Sales chart and 68 on the Billboard Korea K-Pop Hot 100. She released another rap single, "Drip" featuring Jay Park, on November 2. The collaboration reached number 16 on the World Songs chart.

On June 4, 2020, Jessi premiered her new variety show, Jessi's Showterview, on SBS's Mobidic YouTube channel.

The singer released her second extended play, Nuna, on July 30. The single "Nunu Nana" was released in conjunction with the EP. "Nunu Nana" peaked at number two on the Gaon Digital Chart, becoming her first top-ten single as a solo artist and her highest-charting solo single. On August 14, the music video for "Numb" was released.

Jessi joined the cast of MBC reality-variety show Hangout with Yoo in August 2020 as a member of four-member supergroup Refund Sisters (환불 원정대). The group consists of Jessi along with Korean singers Lee Hyo-ri, Uhm Jung-hwa, and Hwasa; they made their debut on October 10, releasing their debut single, "Don't Touch Me." "Don't Touch Me" peaked atop the Gaon Digital Chart for two consecutive weeks.

She also became part of the main cast of tvN variety show Sixth Sense, which reunited her with Yoo Jae-suk and premiered in September 2020. She returned for the series' second season, which began airing in June 2021.

On March 17, 2021, Jessi released a new digital single titled "What Type of X" (어떤X). On October 12, Jessi released the single "Cold Blooded," which was served as a collaborative track with the Mnet dance crew competition show Street Woman Fighter; the dance crews were tasked to choreograph for the song, with YGX winning the segment. Jessi and fellow singer Sunmi featured in an official remix for Ed Sheeran's song "Shivers," which was released on November 24.

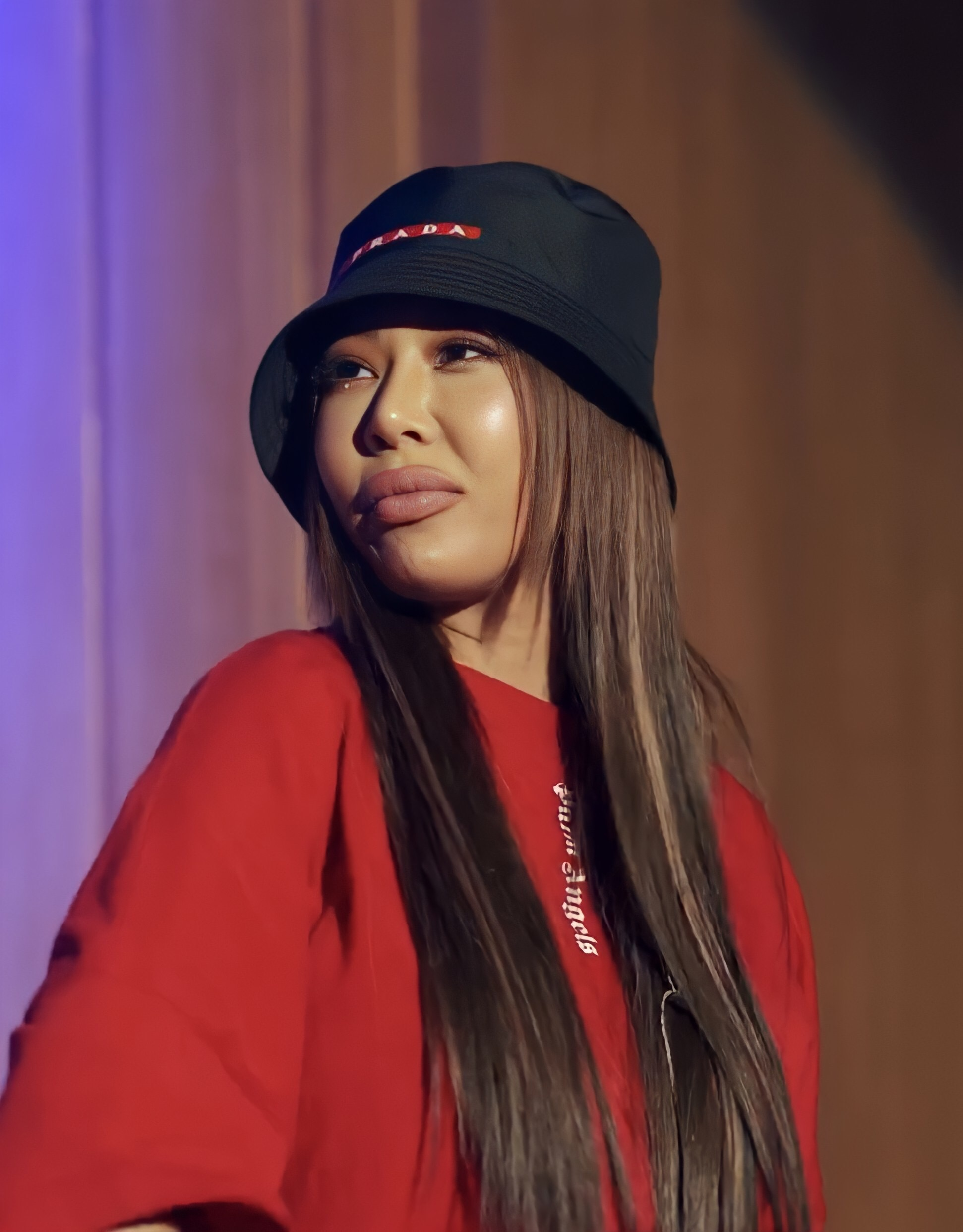
Jessi at the Cultwo Show in 2022

On April 1, 2022, the agency announced that Jessi would make a comeback with the digital single "Zoom" on April 13. The song peaked at number twelve at the Gaon Digital Chart. The song became a viral hit on video platform TikTok. Psy's ninth studio album Psy 9th, released April 29, 2022, features Jessi on the track "Ganji".

In June 2022, it was announced that Showterview would be replacing Sunmi as its host instead of Jessi. Jessi stated on Instagram Live that "she had no idea she was being replaced until the news broke publicly."

On June 10, 2022, it was confirmed that Jessi's contract with P Nation would expire in June 2022, and at the time she was discussing a potential contract extension. On July 6, 2022, P Nation announced that Jessi left the company after three years with the label.

=== 2023–present: More Vision and independent label ===
On April 14, 2023, Jessi signed with Jay Park's label More Vision. On October 25, she released the single "Gum".

On January 31, 2024, it was announced that Jessi had left Jay Park's label More Vision after a mutual decision to terminate her contract. On August 20, 2024, Apple TV+ announced K-Pop Idols, a documentary series featuring Jessi, Blackswan, and Cravity, which premiered on August 30. On September 20, 2024, Jessi signed a management contract with DOD Entertainment and launched her own independent label, UNNI. On October 18, following the fan assault controversy, DOD Entertainment announced that they had terminated the contract at Jessi's request. On June 27, 2025, she made a comeback with her first single under UNNI, “Newsflash”, and partnered with BMG for international distribution.

== Personal life ==
Jessi attended Korea Kent Foreign School along with Girls' Generation members Tiffany Young and Jessica Jung. Jessi successfully passed an SM Entertainment audition, the same company her then two classmates were under. However, she chose not to become part of the label, as she believed its approach to music did not match her style. Before Jessi went on temporary hiatus from the music industry, she struggled to become accustomed to Korean culture. She did not find immediate success after her debut, and was sometimes forced to sleep in saunas when she did not have enough money for a place to stay.

== Controversies ==
In May 2013, Jessi was booked in the case of a group assault filed by a Korean-American identified in the case as "A". The woman claimed that Jessi and her friends assaulted her in the women's restroom of a club in Itaewon. "A" initially pressed charges but later dropped them. Jessi later claimed that she only tried to stop the fight but did not participate in the assault. However, "A" refuted this claim and said that she dropped the charges because she was leaving for the US.

On September 29, 2024, a man who is identified as her fan reported to the police that he was physically assaulted by someone in her group after asking for a picture with her. The victim testified that, when he apologized and was about to leave after Jessi declined his request, the perpetrator in her group suddenly struck him in the face. According to the security footage reviewed by the police, flustered Jessi initially attempted to break up the fight by grabbing the perpetrator's arms, but left the scene shortly afterwards with no further intervention. The victim expressed his disappointment in Jessi for just leaving the scene with no effort to resolve the situation.

She later issued an apology to the victim on social media, and her agency specified that the assailant was a Chinese man who was an acquaintance of the producer in her group. It has been reported that the perpetrator has already left South Korea, and that she is now working with her agency to contact the perpetrator. On 16 October 2024, She was summoned to the Gangnam Police Station as a defendant in the case, but she was released the next day.

== Discography ==
=== Extended plays ===
Title	Details	Peak chart positions		Sales
Title	Details	KOR	US World	Sales
Un2verse	Released: July 13, 2017; Label: YMC Entertainment; Formats: CD, digital download	31	4	KOR: 1,091
Nuna	Released: July 30, 2020; Label: P Nation; Formats: Digital download	—	—	—N/a
P.M.S.	Released: November 12, 2025; Label: UNNI/BMG; Formats: Digital download	—	—	—N/a
"—" denotes releases that did not chart or were not released in that region.

=== Single albums ===
Title	Details	Peak chart positions	Sales
Title	Details	KOR RIAK	Sales
Get Up	Released: December 1, 2005; Label: Doremi Records; Format: CD, digital download; Track listing: 1. W.T.H; 2. Missin' U (Korean Ver.); 3. Get Up; 4. 1-2 Step (Korean Ver.); 5. Give It All; 6. Missin' U (English Ver.); 7. All I Need... 1-2 Step (English Ver.); 8. The Christmas Song	49	KOR: 1,926

=== Live albums ===
Title	Details
Kill Bill 2nd Live: Jessi	Released: February 22, 2019; Label: Soribada; Format: CD, digital download; Track listing: 1. 굳이 (Gucci) (Live); 2. 젖어'S (Wet) (Live) (Feat. Flowsik); 3. Spirit Animal (Live); 4. Down (Live)

=== Singles ===
==== As a lead artist ====
Title	Year	Peak chart positions										Sales	Album
Title	Year	KOR	KOR Billb.	MYS Songs	NZ Hot	PHL Songs	SGP RIAS	SGP Songs	US World	VIE	WW	Sales	Album
"Get Up"	2005	—	—	—	—	—	—	—	—	—	—	—N/a	Get Up
"1-2 Step"	2005	—	—	—	—	—	—	—	—	—	—	—N/a	Get Up
"Life Is Good" (인생은 즐거워)	2009	—	—	—	—	—	—	—	—	—	—	—N/a	The Rebirth
"Unpretty Dreams"	2015	11	—	—	—	—	—	—	—	—	—	KOR: 250,119	Compilation Album Unpretty Rapstar Semi Final
"I Want to Be Me" (나이고 싶어)	2015	31	—	—	—	—	—	—	—	—	—	KOR: 60,061	Non-album singles
"Ssenunni" (쎈언니)	2015	29	—	—	—	—	—	—	—	—	—	KOR: 110,808	Non-album singles
"Raise Your Heels" (뒷꿈치 들어) (featuring Dok2)	2015	94	—	—	—	—	—	—	—	—	—	KOR: 24,074	Non-album singles
"Excessive Love" (살찐 사랑)	2016	65	—	—	—	—	—	—	—	—	—	KOR: 33,087	Non-album singles
"Don't Make Me Cry" (울리지마)	2017	85	—	—	—	—	—	—	—	—	—	KOR: 18,434	Non-album singles
"Gucci"	2017	99	—	—	—	—	—	—	9	—	—	KOR: 22,251	Un2verse
"Down"	2018	—	—	—	—	—	—	—	—	—	—	—N/a	Non-album single
"Who Dat B"	2019	—	68	—	—	—	—	—	8	—	—	—N/a	Nuna
"Drip" (featuring Jay Park)	2019	—	—	—	—	—	—	—	16	—	—	—N/a	Nuna
"Nunu Nana" (눈누난나)	2020	2	2	—	—	—	17	—	17	—	—	—N/a	Nuna
"Numb"	2020	—	—	—	—	—	—	—	—	—	—	—N/a	Nuna
"What Type of X" (어떤X)	2021	38	30	—	40	—	— (Note: "What Type of X" did not enter the RIAS Top International Streaming Chart, but it peaked at number 13 on the Top Regional Streaming Chart.)	—	5	—	—	—N/a	Non-album singles
"Cold Blooded"	2021	30	22	—	—	—	— (Note: "Cold Blooded" did not enter the RIAS Top International Streaming Chart, but it peaked at number 14 on the Top Regional Streaming Chart.)	—	12	—	—	—N/a	Non-album singles
"Zoom"	2022	12	9	5	27	4	5	5	7	21	93	—N/a	Non-album singles
"Gum"	2023	— (Note: "Gum" did not enter the Circle Digital Chart but appeared at number 39 on the component Circle Download Chart.)	—	—	—	—	—	—	—	—	—	—N/a	Non-album singles
"Newsflash"	2025	—	—	—	—	—	—	—	—	—	—	—N/a	P.M.S.
"Girls Like Me"	2025	— (Note: "Girls Like Me" did not enter the Circle Digital Chart, but it peaked at number 150 on the component Circle Download Chart.)	—	—	—	—	—	—	—	—	—	—N/a	P.M.S.
"—" denotes releases that did not chart or were not released in that region.

==== As a featured artist ====
Title	Year	Peak chart positions		Sales	Album
Title	Year	KOR	US World	Sales	Album
"How Much Is Your Love" (얼마짜리 사랑) (Wheesung & Bumkey featuring Jessi of Lucky J)	2014	15	—	KOR: 85,622	Non-album singles
"No No No" (Pharoh featuring Jessi)	2014	—	—	—N/a	Non-album singles
"Bonnie & Clyde" (Vasco featuring C-Luv & Jessi)	2015	—	—	—N/a	Code Name : 211
"Who's Your Mama?" (어머님이 누구니) (Park Jin-young featuring Jessi)	2015	1	12	KOR: 1,160,311	Non-album single
"I Deserve It" (San E featuring Jessi, Illinnit & i11evn)	2015	—	—	KOR: 19,629	The Boy Who Cried Wolf
"Just Like You" (Primary featuring Yankie & Jessi)	2015	73	—	KOR: 35,209	2
"Something I Can Do" (내가 할 수 있는 건) (Black Nut featuring Jessi)	2015	12	—	KOR: 339,052	Show Me the Money 4 Episode 5
"Me, Myself & I" (Heize featuring Wheesung & Jessi)	2015	19	—	KOR: 134,960	Unpretty Rapstar 2
"We" (Turbo featuring K.Will, Jessi)	2015	54	—	KOR: 37,946	Again
"Never Enough" (Double K featuring Jessi)	2016	—	—	—N/a	Non-album single
"Hangover" (술김에) (Baechigi featuring Jessi)	2016	66	—	KOR: 73,190	Regression
"Crazy Guy" (미친놈) (#Gun featuring Jessi)	2016	5	—	KOR: 436,901	Show Me the Money 5 Episode 9
"Talkin Bout" (Microdot featuring Jessi)	2016	—	—	—N/a	+64
"BeBopaLula" (삐빠빠룰라) (Tae Jin-ah featuring Jessi)	2016	—	—	—N/a	Non-album singles
"We Are Young" (위하여)(G2 featuring Jessi)	2016	—	—	—N/a	Non-album singles
"Dawndididdawn" (Dawn featuring Jessi)	2020	—	13	—N/a	Dawndididdawn
"Shivers" (Ed Sheeran featuring Jessi & Sunmi)	2021	—	—	—N/a	=
"Die for Love" (B.I featuring Jessi)	2023	— (Note: "Die for Love" did not enter the Circle Digital Chart, but appeared at number 170 on the Download chart.)	—	—N/a	To Die For
"—" denotes releases that did not chart or were not released in that region.

==== Collaborations ====
Title	Year	Peak chart positions	Sales	Album
Title	Year	KOR	Sales	Album
"I'll Be There" (with The Nuts)	2007	—	—N/a	Platonic Syndrome: White Romance Vol.1
"My Type" (with Cheetah feat. Kangnam)	2015	2	KOR: 778,193	Unpretty Rapstar Compilation
"Kwaejina Ching Ching Nane" (쾌지나 칭칭나네 (with Kim Young-im & Crispi Crunch)	2016	—	—N/a	Non-album singles
"K.B.B" (가위바위보) (with Microdot, Dumbfoundead & Lyricks)	2016	—	—N/a	Non-album singles
"Life Is Beautiful" (with VaVa, Yitai Wang & DOK2)	2020	—	—N/a	Non-album singles
"—" denotes releases that did not chart or were not released in that region.

=== Soundtrack appearances ===
Title	Year	Album
"Engraved" (각인)	2015	Glamorous Temptation OST
"Why Do You" (너는 왜) (with Hanhae of Phantom)	2016	Two Yoo Project Sugar Man OST
"My Romeo"	2016	Cinderella with Four Knights OST
"A match (Kill Bill)" (성냥 한 개비 (킬빌)) (featuring Double K)	2019	Target: Billboard - Kill Bill
"Gosh"	2022	Woori the Virgin OST

=== Other charted songs ===
Title	Year	Peak chart positions		Sales	Album
Title	Year	KOR Gaon	US World	Sales	Album
"Ganji" (Psy featuring Jessi)	2022	122	15	—N/a	Psy 9th
"Don't Tell" (Kang Daniel featuring Jessi)	2022	— (Note: "Don't Tell" did not enter the Gaon Digital Chart, but it peaked at number 36 on the component Gaon Download Chart.)	—	—N/a	The Story
"—" denotes releases that did not chart.

== Composition credits ==
All song credits are adapted from Korea Music Copyright Association (KMCA) database otherwise noted.

Year	Album	Artist	Song	Lyrics		Composer	
Year	Album	Artist	Song	Credited	With	Credited	With
2005	Get Up	Herself	"WTH"	Yes	–	No	–
2005	Get Up	Herself	"Missin' U (English Ver.)"	Yes	–	No	–
2005	Get Up	Herself	"All I need...1-2 Step (English Ver.)"	Yes	–	No	–
2015	Unpretty Rapstar compilation album	Herself	"My Type. prod by Verbal Jint"	Yes	Jintae Kim, Hyun Joo, Cheetah|	No	–
2015	Unpretty Rapstar compilation album	Herself	"Unpretty Dreams"	Yes	J'Kyun	Yes	Gray
2015	Non-album single	Herself	"I want to be"	No	–	Yes	6d
2015	Non-album single	Herself	"strong sister"	Yes	237	No	–
2015	Non-album single	Herself	"Heel Up " feat. Dok2	Yes	earattack, Dok2	No	–
2016	It's good luck	Herself	"It's good luck"	Yes	Crispi Crunch	No	
2016	It's good luck	Herself	"Kwijina Ching Ching Nane 쾌지나 칭칭나네"	Yes	Crispi Crunch	No	–
2017	High School Rapper Regional Competition Part.2	Herself	"I'm good"	Yes	Kim Dong-hyun (MC Gree)	Yes	Big Banana
2017	Un2verse	Herself	"Gucci"	Yes	Swings, Antonia Macklin jr 'Anti pop'	No	–
2017	Un2verse	Herself	"Boing" feat. Changmo	Yes	Swings, Antonia Macklin jr 'Anti pop'	No	–
2017	Un2verse	Herself	"My Walk" feat. Year of the OX	Yes	Year Of The OX, BLACK WAVE	No	–
2017	Un2verse	Herself	"Spirit Animal"	Yes	Dumbfoundead	Yes	Dumbfoundead
2017	Un2verse	Herself	"Arrived"	Yes	Dumbfoundead	Yes	Dumbfoundead
2017	Mix and the City Part.3	Herself	"Love Me When I'm Gone"	Yes	AK47	Yes	Torai Park
2018	Non-album single	Herself	"Thorns,"	Yes	Double K, Microdot	Yes	LUKA. 5ILY
2018	Non-album single	Herself	"Down"	Yes	Double K	Yes	GRAY, Danny Chung
2019	Kill Bill Special Stage	Herself	"One Match" feat. Double K	Yes	ILLSON	Yes	Konquest, Whos (WHO$), Kriz, Kyung-hyun Cho
2019	Kill Bill Special Stage	Herself	"Wet'S" feat. Flowsik	Yes	Flowsik, Gonhills	Yes	Flowsik, Gonhills, Revive, Punch Sound
2019	Non-album single	Herself	"Who Dat B"	Yes	Double K, Brian Lee	Yes	Brian lee, Jessie Lauren Foutz
2019	Non-album single	Herself	"Drip" feat. Jay Park	Yes	Jay Park, john john	Yes	johnjohn, CuzD
2020	Nuna	Herself	"Nunu Nana"	Yes	PSY, ILLSON, PENOMECO, DAMIAN, JohnJohn, Jaero	No	–
2020	Nuna	Herself	"STAR"	Yes	Illson (Double K), JAE RO,	Yes	Yoo Geon-hyung, JAE RO
2020	Nuna	Herself	"Put it on ya (Feat. BM of KARD, nafla)"	Yes	nafla, BM of KARD, johnjohn, JAE RO	No	–
2020	Nuna	Herself	"Numb"	Yes	Emile Ghantous, Angel Taylor, Peter Chun, Aurora Pfeiffer	Yes	Emile Ghantous, Angel Taylor, Peter Chun, Aurora Pfeiffer
2021	Non-album single	Herself	"What Type of X"	Yes	Psy, JohnJohn, Jaero, KOALA	Yes	PSY, Gunhyung Yoo, Kurz D, JohnJohn, Jaero, Donna, SPACE ONE
2021	Non-album single	Herself	"Cold Blooded"	Yes	Bobblehead JohnJohn, Jaero	Yes	Bobblehead, CuzD, bayb
2021	Non-album single	Secret Number	"Fire Saturday"	Yes	BEATAMIN	No	–
2022	Non-album single	Herself	"Zoom"	Yes	PSY, bobblehead, Yeomda	No	–
2022	Psy 9th	Psy	"Ganji"	Yes	Psy	No	–
2023	To Die For	B.I	"Die For Love"	Yes	B.I	Yes	White Noise Club (Note: The five members of the team – B.I, Kim Chang-hoon, Millennium, Padi and Sihwang – were registered as composers with the Korea Music Copyright Association.)

== Filmography ==
=== Television show ===
Year	Title	Role	Notes	Ref.
2014	The Hairy Bikers' Asian Adventure	Herself	Episode 6	
2015	Unpretty Rapstar	Contestant	Runner-up	
2015	Real Men 3	Cast member		
2015	King of Mask Singer	Contestant	With the stage name "Miss Korea" (Episode 35)	
2016	Sister's Slam Dunk	Cast member		
2016	Duet Song Festival	Contestant	With Kim Seok-goo (Episode 1–2)	
2017	High School Rapper	Judge		
2018	King of Mask Singer	Contestant	As Laundry Fairy (Episode 161–162)	
2020–2022	Sixth Sense	Cast member	Season 1–3	
2020	Hangout with Yoo	Cast member	Episode 57–68, 82-83	
2020	Law of the Jungle – Tribe Chief and Granny	Cast member	Episode 427–429	
2020–2021	Cap-Teen	Judge		
2021	Street Woman Fighter	Special Guest		

=== Web show ===
Year	Title	Role	Notes	Ref.
2020–2022	Showterview with Jessi	Host	SBS's Mobidic channel	

=== Film ===
Year	Title	Role	Notes	Ref.
2024	K-Pops!	Herself	Cameo appearance	

=== Television series ===
Year	Title	Role	Ref.
2021	Somehow Family	Herself	

== Concerts ==
- Zoom in Manila (2022)

== Awards and nominations ==
Name of the award ceremony, year presented, category, nominee of the award, and the result of the nomination
Award ceremony	Year	Category	Nominee(s) / Work(s)	Result	Ref.
Asia Artist Awards	2021	Female Solo Singer Popularity Award	Jessi	Nominated	
Asia Artist Awards	2023	Popularity Award – Singer (Female)	Jessi	Nominated	
Brand Customer Loyalty Awards	2021	Best Female Solo Artist	Jessi	Nominated	
Gaon Chart Music Awards	2021	Song of the Year – July	"Nunu Nana"	Nominated	
Golden Disc Awards	2021	Best Solo Artist	Jessi	Won	
KBS Entertainment Awards	2016	Best Newcomer in Variety Show	Jessi	Nominated	
Korea Cable TV Awards	2016	Cable Star Awards – Best Singer	Jessi	Won	
Korea First Brand Awards	2021	Best R&B/Hip-Hop Artist	Jessi	Won	
Korea First Brand Awards	2021	Hot Icon	Jessi	Won	
MBC Entertainment Awards	2020	Excellence Award in Music/Talk Category – Female	Omniscient Interfering View & Hangout with Yoo	Won	
Mnet Asian Music Awards	2020	Worldwide Icon of the Year	Jessi	Nominated	
Mnet Asian Music Awards	2020	Best Dance Performance – Solo	"Nunu Nana"	Nominated	
Mnet Asian Music Awards	2020	Favorite Dance Performance – Female Solo	"Nunu Nana"	Won	
Mnet Asian Music Awards	2020	Song of the Year	"Nunu Nana"	Nominated	
Mnet Asian Music Awards	2021	Best Hip Hop & Urban Music	"What Type of X"	Nominated	
SBS Entertainment Awards	2020	Rookie Award	SBS Mobidic: Jessi's Showterview	Won	
Seoul Music Awards	2021	Best R&B Hiphop Award	"Nunu Nana"	Won	
Seoul Music Awards	2021	Main Award (Bonsang)	Jessi	Nominated	
Seoul Music Awards	2021	Popularity Award	Jessi	Nominated	
Seoul Music Awards	2021	K-wave Popularity Award	Jessi	Nominated	
Style Icon Asia	2016	Awesome Swagger	Jessi	Won	
The Fact Music Awards	2020	Best Performer	Jessi	Won	
The Fact Music Awards	2020	TMA Popularity Award	Jessi	Nominated	
