= P Nation =

South Korean entertainment company

- Native name: 피네이션
- Type: Private
- Industry: Entertainment
- Genre: K-pop; dance-pop; electropop; R&B; hip hop
- Founded: October 29, 2018; 8 years ago
- Founder: Psy
- Headquarters: 21, Nonhyun-ro 151-gil, Sinsa-dong, Gangnam, Seoul, South Korea
- Key people: Kim Lionelsoo (CEO); Psy (Founder, executive director)
- Revenue: 10–50 billion won
- Owner: Psy (62.6%); SK Telecom (10%); DY Holdings (10%) (2019)
- Website: pnation.com

P Nation (Korean: 피네이션) is a South Korean entertainment company. The company operates as a record label, entertainment agency, and concert production company founded in 2018 by singer Psy. As of February 2026, the label had eight artists signed to the label. The record label is located in the Gangnam area.

== History ==
=== 2019-present: Founding and first artists ===
Following Psy's departure from YG Entertainment in 2018, Psy founded his own entertainment company, P Nation. Psy announced the first artist signed to his label in January 2019, the rapper Jessi. Later that month P Nation signed Hyuna and Dawn, after their joint departure from Cube Entertainment.

Following the announcement of the establishment of P Nation, the stock of DI Corporation, owned by Psy's father, rose for eight consecutive days, despite the companies having no business connections.

In April, SK Telecom invested 5 billion won in the company as part of their content investment strategy, bringing their sharehold to ten percent. In June, P Nation signed the singer Crush.

In September 2020, Heize, a rapper and singer previously signed to Stone Music Entertainment, was signed to the label. In November, it was announced that P Nation would join with JYP Entertainment to host a new survival reality show, titled Loud, that would result in two new boy groups, one from each company. The program aired in 2021, following global auditions for the program. In December, P Nation signed D.Ark, a rapper who appeared on Show Me the Money 777, Show Me the Money 9 and High School Rapper 4.

In April 2021, Penomeco and Swings were each announced to have signed with P Nation. On November 12, 2021, it was confirmed that D.Ark had left P Nation.

On May 17, 2022, P Nation debuted their first boy group, TNX, with 6 members. On July 6, 2022, it was announced that Jessi would be leaving P Nation after 3 years. On August 29, Hyuna and Dawn also left the label. In October 2022, P Nation launched an online fan forum called SoPSYety, based on non-fungible tokens (NFT).

On June 30, 2023, Hwasa signed with P Nation while performing on stage at founder Psy's Summer Swag concert. On September 15, P Nation officially signed An Shin-ae of The Barberettes.

== Concert incidents ==
In July 2022, Psy's Summer Swag concerts were under investigation for audience transmission of COVID-19. South Korea's Central Disaster and Safety Countermeasure Headquarters had received multiple reports from people who claimed to have contracted COVID-19 after attending a music concert that "sprays water". In August 2022, P Nation offices were raided by authorities investigating the death of a construction worker at a concert venue. The construction worker, in his 20's, had fallen to his death while dissembling Psy's Summer Swag concert venue.

== Artists ==
=== Groups ===
- TNX
- Baby Dont Cry

=== Soloists ===
- Psy
- Crush
- Heize
- Swings
- Hwasa
- An Shin-ae
- Daniel Jikal

== Former artists ==
- D.Ark (2020–2021)
- Jessi (2019–2022)
- Hyuna (2019–2022)
- Dawn (2019–2022)
- Penomeco (2021–2024)
- TNX
  - Kyungjun (2022–2024)

== Discography ==
Released	Title	Artist	Type	Format
2019	"Nappa"	Crush	Digital single	Digital download
2019	"Who Dat B"	Jessi	Digital single	Digital download
2019	"Drip"	Jessi	Digital single	Digital download
2019	"Money"	Dawn	Digital single	Digital download
2019	"Flower Shower"	Hyuna	Digital single	Digital download
2019	From Midnight to Sunrise	Crush	Studio album	CD, digital download
2020	"Digital Lover"	Crush	Digital single	Digital download
2020	"Maday"	Crush	Digital single	Digital download
2020	"Ohio"	Crush	Digital single	Digital download
2020	Nuna	Jessi	Extended Play	Digital download
2020	Dawndididawn	Dawn	Extended Play	Digital download
2020	With Her	Crush	Extended Play	CD, digital download
2020	"Potential"	D.Ark	Digital single	Digital download
2021	I'm Not Cool	Hyuna	Extended Play	CD, Digital download
2021	"What Type of X"	Jessi	Digital single	Digital download
2021	Dry Flower	Penomeco	Extended Play	CD, Digital download
2021	Genius	D.Ark	Extended Play	CD, Digital download
2021	Happen	Heize	Extended Play	CD, Digital download
2021	"Organic"	Penomeco	Digital single	Digital download
2021	1+1=1	Hyuna & Dawn	Extended play	CD, Digital download
2021	"Cold Blooded"	Jessi	Digital single	Digital download
2022	"Mother"	Heize	Digital single	Digital download
2022	"Zoom"	Jessi	Digital single	Digital download
2022	Psy 9th	Psy	Studio album	CD, Digital download
2022	Way Up	TNX	Extended Play	CD, Digital download
2022	"Stupid Cool"	Dawn	Digital Single	Digital Download
2022	Undo	Heize	Studio album	CD, Digital download
2022	Nabillera	Hyuna	Extended play	CD, Digital download
2022	"Rush Hour" (feat. J-Hope of BTS)	Crush	Digital single	Digital download
2023	Love Never Dies	TNX	Extended play	CD, Digital download
2023	[ Rorschach ] Part 1	Penomeco	Extended play	CD, Digital download
2023	[ Rorschach ] Part 2	Penomeco	Extended play	CD, Digital download
2023	"I Love My Body"	Hwasa	Digital single	Digital download
2023	"Respect"	An Shin-ae	Digital single	Digital download
2023	wonderego	Crush	Studio album	CD, Digital download
2023	Last Winter	Heize	Extended play	CD, Digital download
2024	"Fresh"	Daniel Jikal	Digital single	Digital download
2024	Upgrade V	Swings	Studio album	CD, Digital download
2024	"Fuego"	The New Six	Digital single	Digital download
2024	O	Hwasa	Extended play	CD, Digital download
2024	Fallin'	Heize	Extended play	CD, Digital download
2025	Dear Life	An Shinae	Extended play	CD, Digital download
2025	For Real?	TNX	Extended play	CD, Digital download
2025	"F Girl"	Baby Don't Cry	Digital single	Digital download
2025	Fang	Crush	Extended play	CD, Digital download
2025	"Good Goodbye"	Hwasa	Digital single	Digital download
