= Zoom (Jessi song) =

Single by Jessi
- Released: April 13, 2022
- Recorded: Ingrid Studio; P Nation Studio
- Genre: Hip hop; trap
- Length: 2:55
- Label: P Nation
- Songwriters: Jessi; Psy; Bobblehead; Yumdda

Jessi singles chronology
"Cold Blooded" (2021)	"Zoom" (2022)	"Gum" (2023)

Music video
- "Zoom" on YouTube

"Zoom" is a song by Korean-American rapper and singer Jessi. It was released on April 13, 2022, by P Nation and distributed by Kakao Entertainment. An upbeat hip hop and trap song, "Zoom" was written by Jessi, Psy, Bobblehead, and Yumdda.

"Zoom" was the final release by Jessi under P Nation, as she would depart the label on July 6, 2022.

== Background and release ==
In October 2021, Jessi released the digital single "Cold Blooded", in collaboration with the Mnet reality show Street Woman Fighter. In March 2022, P Nation then announced that she would be coming back with a new single that April. The first teaser trailer was released to YouTube on April 11, 2022, followed by a second on April 12. "Zoom" was released to digital music platforms as a single on April 13, 2022.

== Composition ==
"Zoom" is an upbeat hip hop and trap song, inspired by people's desire to be "photographed and get attention from others", which Jessi called "a sad reality" in an interview with NME. The song was written by Jessi, Psy, Bobblehead, and Yumdda, while it was arranged by the later two. The song was composed in the key of F# major with tempo of 100 BPM.

== Commercial performance ==
In South Korea, "Zoom" debuted at number 155 on the Gaon Digital Chart for the issue dated April 10–16, 2022, with 2,350,415 Gaon Index points; on its component charts, the song debuted at number 17 on the Gaon Download Chart for the week dated April 10–16 and number 89 on the Gaon Streaming Chart for the week dated April 17–24. The song later peaked at number 12 on the Gaon Digital Chart for the issue dated May 8–14. "Zoom" peaked at number 76 on the now-defunct K-pop Hot 100 and number nine on South Korea Songs, which replaced the former as part of Billboard's Hits of the World series of record charts. Elsewhere in Asia, "Zoom" peaked at number eight in Indonesia, five in Malaysia, four in the Philippines, five in Singapore, 20 in Taiwan, and 21 in Vietnam.

In New Zealand, "Zoom" debuted and peaked at number 27 on the RMNZ Hot Singles chart, Jessi's second and highest debut on the chart. The song debuted at number seven on the World Digital Song Sales chart. It has since charted for six weeks, being her longest-charting song on the chart. The song debuted at number 163 on the Billboard Global 200 for the issue dated May 1–7, 2022, peaking at number 93 the next week and charting for four total weeks.

== Personnel ==
- Jessi – vocals, songwriting
- Psy – songwriting, production
- Bobblehead – songwriting
- Yumdda – songwriting
- Yoo Geon-hyung – production, arrangement
- Bayb – production, arrangement
- Lee Ki-ho – recording, digital editing
- Jung Eun-kyung – recording
- Stay Tuned – mixing
- Kwon Nam-woo – mastering

Studio

- Ingrid Studio – recording
- P Nation – recording, digital editing
- Stay Tuned Studio – mixing
- 821 Sound – mastering

== Charts ==
=== Weekly charts ===
Weekly chart performance for "Zoom"
Chart (2022)	Peak position
Global 200 (Billboard)	93
Indonesia (Billboard)	8
Malaysia (Billboard)	5
New Zealand Hot Singles (RMNZ)	27
Philippines (Billboard)	4
Singapore (RIAS)	5
Singapore (Billboard)	5
South Korea (Gaon)	12
South Korea (K-pop Hot 100)	76
South Korea (Billboard)	9
Taiwan (Billboard)	20
US World Digital Song Sales (Billboard)	7
Vietnam (Vietnam Hot 100)	21

=== Monthly charts ===
Monthly chart performance for "Zoom"
Chart (2022)	Position
South Korea (Gaon)	14

=== Year-end charts ===
Year-end chart performance for "Zoom"
Chart (2022)	Position
South Korea (Circle)	97

== Release history ==
Release history and formats for "Zoom"
Region	Date	Format	Label	Ref.
Various	April 13, 2022	Digital download; streaming	P Nation; Kakao	
