= Heize =

South Korean singer and rapper (born 1991)

- 장다혜
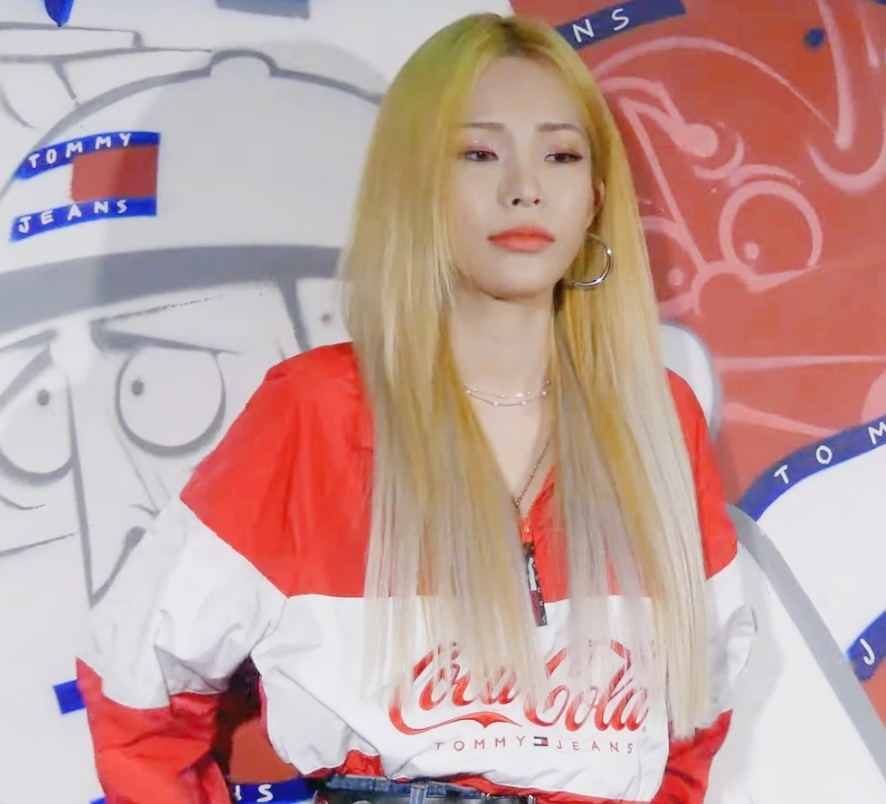
- Heize in April 2019
- Born: Jang Da-hye; August 9, 1991 (age 35); Daegu, South Korea
- Education: Pukyong National University
- Occupations: Singer; songwriter; rapper; composer; producer
- Musical career
- Genres: K-pop; R&B; neo soul; hip hop; pop
- Instrument: Vocals
- Years active: 2014–present
- Labels: Stone; Studio Blu; P Nation
- Website: Official website

Korean name
- Hangul: 장다혜
- Hanja: 張多蕙
- RR: Jang Dahye
- MR: Chang Tahye

Jang Da-hye (Korean: 장다혜; born August 9, 1991), better known by her stage name Heize (헤이즈), is a South Korean singer-songwriter, rapper, composer and producer currently signed to P Nation. The name Heize was inspired by the name of an American rapper Angel Haze, but instead of using the same English spelling, she decided to use Heize instead of Haze, because that was the spelling that came to mind. After making her debut in 2014 with the EP Heize, she gained attention after appearing on the second season of South Korean reality show Unpretty Rapstar. Shortly after, her breakout hit "Star" reached the top of the music charts.

== Career ==
=== 2014–2019: Career beginnings ===
Heize made her debut in 2014 with her EP Heize, which included a total of six songs. Heize took part in Mnet's reality rap show Unpretty Rapstar but was eliminated in the semi-finals. Nevertheless, her appearance brought her attention as a singer.

Heize released her second EP And July in 2016, and it eventually peaked at 34 at the Gaon Music Chart. The two singles "And July" and "Shut Up & Groove" peaked at 8 and 27, respectively, on the Korean national chart. "Shut Up & Groove" also charted on Billboard US World chart.

Heize released her digital single "Star" in December 2016, and it achieved an "All-Kill" after reaching number one in all Korean music real-time charts upon release. Her third extended play, /// (You, Clouds, Rain) (2017) and its lead singles "Don't Know You" and "You, Clouds, Rain" were successful and achieved "All-Kill" after reaching number one in all Korean music real-time charts and charted at number one on Gaon Digital Chart. Heize released her fourth EP, Wind (alternatively called Wish & Wind), on March 8, 2018. It was well received, with the lead singles topping the charts.

=== 2019–present: She's Fine, Undo and OSTs ===
Heize released her first studio album, She's Fine, on March 19, 2019. The album contains 11 songs and features appearances from Simon Dominic, Colde, Sunwoo Jung-a, Jooyoung, Nafla and DAVII. She reportedly chose the title of the album because she "wanted to tell people that it's all fine." Billboard ranked the album as number 11 on its list of the "25 Best K-pop Albums of 2019", commenting, "Satin-soft sensitivity wraps the album in warm comfort, drawing one into Heize's heart and proving why she is one of the most colorful and exciting artists of her generation."

On July 7, 2019, Heize released the single "We Don't Talk Together" featuring Korean rapper Giriboy. Produced by Suga, the alt R&B song is co-written by Heize and is about how a former couple has grown far apart from one another." The song reached number two on the South Korean Gaon Digital Chart.

On September 16, 2020, it was announced that Heize signed with P Nation, an entertainment company founded by Psy. On May 20, 2021, Heize released her seventh EP, Happen, her first release under P Nation. On March 29, 2022, Heize released the digital single, "Mother". On June 30, 2022, Heize released her second studio album, Undo. In August 2022, Heize will join the radio show Heize's Volume Up, which will air for the first time on August 22, joining after the actress, Shin Ye-eun who withdrew.

In November 2025, it was announced that Heize will release her tenth mini-album Love Virus Pt.1, with the lead single of the same name, featuring I.M, on November 27. She was featured in Loona Chuu's song Rule on July 2, 2026.

== Discography ==
Studio albums

- She's Fine (2019)
- Undo (2022)

== Filmography ==
=== Television shows ===
Year	Title	Role	Notes	Ref.
2015	Unpretty Rapstar 2	Contestant		
2019	Two Yoo Project Sugar Man	Host	Season 3	
2023	Begin Again - Intermission	Cast Member	spin-off	

=== Radio shows ===
Year	Title	Role	Notes	Ref.
2019	Heize's Diary	Host		
2022–2023	Heize's Volume Up	Host	August 22, 2022 – September 3, 2023	

== Tours and concerts ==
- Heize 1st Concert 'Heize City (2022)

== Awards and nominations ==
Name of the award ceremony, year presented, category, nominee of the award, and the result of the nomination
Award ceremony	Year	Category	Nominee / work	Result	Ref.
Asia Artist Awards	2021	Female Solo Singer Popularity Award	Heize	Nominated	
Brand Customer Loyalty Awards	2020	Most Influential R&B/Soul Artist	Heize	Won	
Brand of the Year Awards	2020	R&B Soul Artist	Heize	Won	
Brand of the Year Awards	2021	Female Vocalist	Heize	Won	
Circle Chart Music Awards	2017	Song of the Year – July	"And July"	Nominated	
Circle Chart Music Awards	2017	Song of the Year – December	"Star"	Nominated	
Circle Chart Music Awards	2018	Song of the Year – June	"Don't Know You"	Nominated	
Circle Chart Music Awards	2018	Song of the Year – June	"You, Clouds, Rain"	Nominated	
Circle Chart Music Awards	2018	R&B Discovery of the Year	Heize	Won	
Circle Chart Music Awards	2019	Song of the Year – March	"Didn't Know Me"	Nominated	
Circle Chart Music Awards	2019	Song of the Year – March	"Jenga"	Nominated	
Circle Chart Music Awards	2020	Artist of the Year – Digital Music (July)	"We Don't Talk Together"	Nominated	
Circle Chart Music Awards	2022	Artist of the Year – Digital Music (May)	"Happen"	Nominated	
Dong-A.com's Pick	2017	National Pension Award	Heize	Won	
Genie Music Awards	2018	Artist of the Year	Heize	Nominated	
Genie Music Awards	2018	Song of the Year	"Jenga"	Nominated	
Genie Music Awards	2018	Best Female Vocal Performance	"Jenga"	Won	
Genie Music Awards	2018	Best Female Solo	Heize	Nominated	
Genie Music Awards	2018	Genie Music Popularity Award	Heize	Nominated	
Genie Music Awards	2019	The Female Solo Artist	Heize	Nominated	
Golden Disc Awards	2018	Digital Daesang	"You, Clouds, Rain"	Nominated	
Golden Disc Awards	2018	Digital Bonsang	"You, Clouds, Rain"	Won	
Golden Disc Awards	2018	Global Popularity Award	Heize	Nominated	
Golden Disc Awards	2019	Popularity Award	Heize	Nominated	
Golden Disc Awards	2019	Digital Bonsang	"Jenga"	Nominated	
Golden Disc Awards	2022	Digital Song Bonsang	"Happen"	Won	
Golden Disc Awards	2022	Seezn Most Popular Artist Award	"Heize"	Nominated	
Korea Popular Music Awards	2018	Best Ballad	"Jenga"	Nominated	
Korean Culture and Entertainment Awards	2016	K-Pop Singer Award	Heize	Won	
K-Global Heart Dream Awards	2022	K-Global Heart Dream Bonsang	Heize	Won	
K-Global Heart Dream Awards	2023	K-Global Best OST Award	Heize	Won	
Korean Music Awards	2019	Best Pop Song	"Jenga"	Nominated	
Melon Music Awards	2017	Artist of the Year	Heize	Nominated	
Melon Music Awards	2017	Top 10 Artist	Heize	Won	
Melon Music Awards	2017	Kakao Hot Star Award	Heize	Nominated	
Melon Music Awards	2018	Top 10 Artist	Heize	Nominated	
Melon Music Awards	2018	Best Rap/Hip Hop Award	"Jenga"	Nominated	
Melon Music Awards	2018	Best OST	"Would Be Better"	Nominated	
Melon Music Awards	2019	Top 10 Artist	Heize	Won	
Melon Music Awards	2019	Artist of the Year	Heize	Nominated	
Melon Music Awards	2019	Best R&B/Soul	"We Don't Talk Together"	Won	
Melon Music Awards	2021	Album of the Year	Happen	Nominated	
Melon Music Awards	2021	Song of the Year	"Happen"	Nominated	
Melon Music Awards	2021	Top 10 Artist	Heize	Won	
Melon Music Awards	2021	Best Female Artist	Heize	Nominated	
Mnet Asian Music Awards	2017	Best Female Artist	Heize	Nominated	
Mnet Asian Music Awards	2017	Best HipHop & Urban Music	"Don't Know You"	Won	
Mnet Asian Music Awards	2017	Best Vocal Performance – Solo	"You, Clouds, Rain"	Won	
Mnet Asian Music Awards	2017	Song of the Year	"You, Clouds, Rain"	Nominated	
Mnet Asian Music Awards	2018	Best Female Artist	Heize	Nominated	
Mnet Asian Music Awards	2018	Artist of the Year	Heize	Nominated	
Mnet Asian Music Awards	2018	Best Vocal Performance – Solo	"Didn't Know Me"	Won	
Mnet Asian Music Awards	2018	Song of the Year	"Didn't Know Me"	Nominated	
Mnet Asian Music Awards	2018	Best HipHop & Urban Music	"Jenga"	Nominated	
Mnet Asian Music Awards	2018	Song of the Year	"Jenga"	Nominated	
Mnet Asian Music Awards	2019	Best Female Artist	Heize	Nominated	
Mnet Asian Music Awards	2019	Artist of the Year	Heize	Nominated	
Mnet Asian Music Awards	2019	Best Collaboration	"We Don't Talk Together"	Nominated	
Mnet Asian Music Awards	2019	Song of the Year	"We Don't Talk Together"	Nominated	
Mnet Asian Music Awards	2019	Best HipHop & Urban Music	"She's Fine"	Won	
Mnet Asian Music Awards	2019	Song of the Year	"She's Fine"	Nominated	
Mnet Asian Music Awards	2019	Worldwide Fans' Choice Top 10	Heize	Nominated	
Mnet Asian Music Awards	2021	Best Female Artist	Heize	Nominated	
Mnet Asian Music Awards	2021	Artist of the Year	Heize	Longlisted	
Mnet Asian Music Awards	2021	Worldwide Fans' Choice Top 10	Heize	Nominated	
Mnet Asian Music Awards	2021	Song of the Year	"Happen"	Longlisted	
Mnet Asian Music Awards	2021	Best Vocal Performance	"Happen"	Nominated	
Seoul Music Awards	2018	Bonsang Award	Heize	Nominated	
Seoul Music Awards	2018	Popularity Award	Heize	Nominated	
Seoul Music Awards	2018	Hallyu Special Award	Heize	Nominated	
Seoul Music Awards	2019	Bonsang Award	Heize	Nominated	
Seoul Music Awards	2019	Popularity Award	Heize	Nominated	
Seoul Music Awards	2019	Hallyu Special Award	Heize	Nominated	
Seoul Music Awards	2021	OST Award	"Midnight"	Nominated	
Seoul Music Awards	2022	Bonsang Award	Heize	Won	
Seoul Music Awards	2022	Popularity Award	Heize	Nominated	
Seoul Music Awards	2022	Hallyu Popularity Award	Heize	Nominated	
Seoul Music Awards	2025	R&B / Hip-Hop Award	Heize	Nominated	
Seoul Music Awards	2025	Ballad Award	Heize	Nominated	
