= Gangnam Style =

2012 single by Psy

Single by Psy

from the EP Psy 6 (Six Rules), Part 1
- Language: Korean
- Released: July 15, 2012
- Recorded: 2011–2012
- Genre: K-pop; hip hop; dance-pop; EDM
- Length: 3:39
- Label: YG; Universal Republic; School Boy
- Composers: Park Jae-sang; Yoo Gun-hyung
- Lyricist: Park Jae-sang
- Producers: Yang Hyun-suk (exec.); Psy; Yoo Gun-hyung

Psy singles chronology
"Korea" (2012)	"Gangnam Style" (2012)	"Gentleman" (2013)

Psy 6 (Six Rules), Part 1 Disc artwork

Audio sample
- "Gangnam Style": file; help

Music video
- "Gangnam Style" on YouTube

Korean name
- Hangul: 강남스타일
- Hanja: 江南스타일
- RR: Gangnam seutail
- MR: Kangnam sŭt'ail

"Gangnam Style" (Korean: 강남스타일; pronounced [kaŋnam sɯtʰa.iɭ]) is a K-pop song by South Korean singer Psy, released on July 15, 2012, by YG Entertainment as the lead single of his first extended play, Psy 6 (Six Rules), Part 1. Gangnam District is a top global hub for fashion and trends and a wealthy neighborhood, home to countless luxury residences, high-end designer boutiques, and skyscrapers. The term "Gangnam Style" is a neologism that refers to the nouveau riche lifestyles associated with the Gangnam region of Seoul.

"Gangnam Style" was released on to Psy's YouTube channel and debuted at number one on South Korea's Gaon Chart, receiving generally positive reviews, with praise for its catchy beat and Psy's amusing dancing during live performances and in various locations around the world in its music video. The song and its music video went viral in August 2012 and have influenced popular culture worldwide. In the United States, "Gangnam Style" peaked at number two on the Billboard Hot 100, which at the time, was the highest charting song by a South Korean artist. By the end of 2012, "Gangnam Style" had topped the music charts of more than 30 countries including Australia, Canada, France, Germany, Italy, Spain, and the United Kingdom. Psy's dance in the music video itself became a cultural phenomenon.

The song subsequently won Best Video at the MTV Europe Music Awards held that year. It became a source of parodies and reaction videos by many different individuals, groups, and organizations. On December 21, 2012, "Gangnam Style" became the first YouTube video to reach a billion views. The song's music video was the most viewed video on YouTube from November 24, 2012, when it surpassed the music video for "Baby" by Justin Bieber featuring Ludacris, to July 10, 2017, when it was itself surpassed by the music video for "See You Again" by Wiz Khalifa featuring Charlie Puth.

The song's dance was attempted by political leaders such as British Prime Minister David Cameron and United Nations Secretary-General Ban Ki-moon, who hailed it as "a force for world peace". On May 7, 2013, at a bilateral meeting with South Korea's President Park Geun-hye at the White House, U.S. President Barack Obama cited the success of "Gangnam Style" as an example of how people around the world are being "swept up" by the Korean Wave of culture.

== Background and release ==
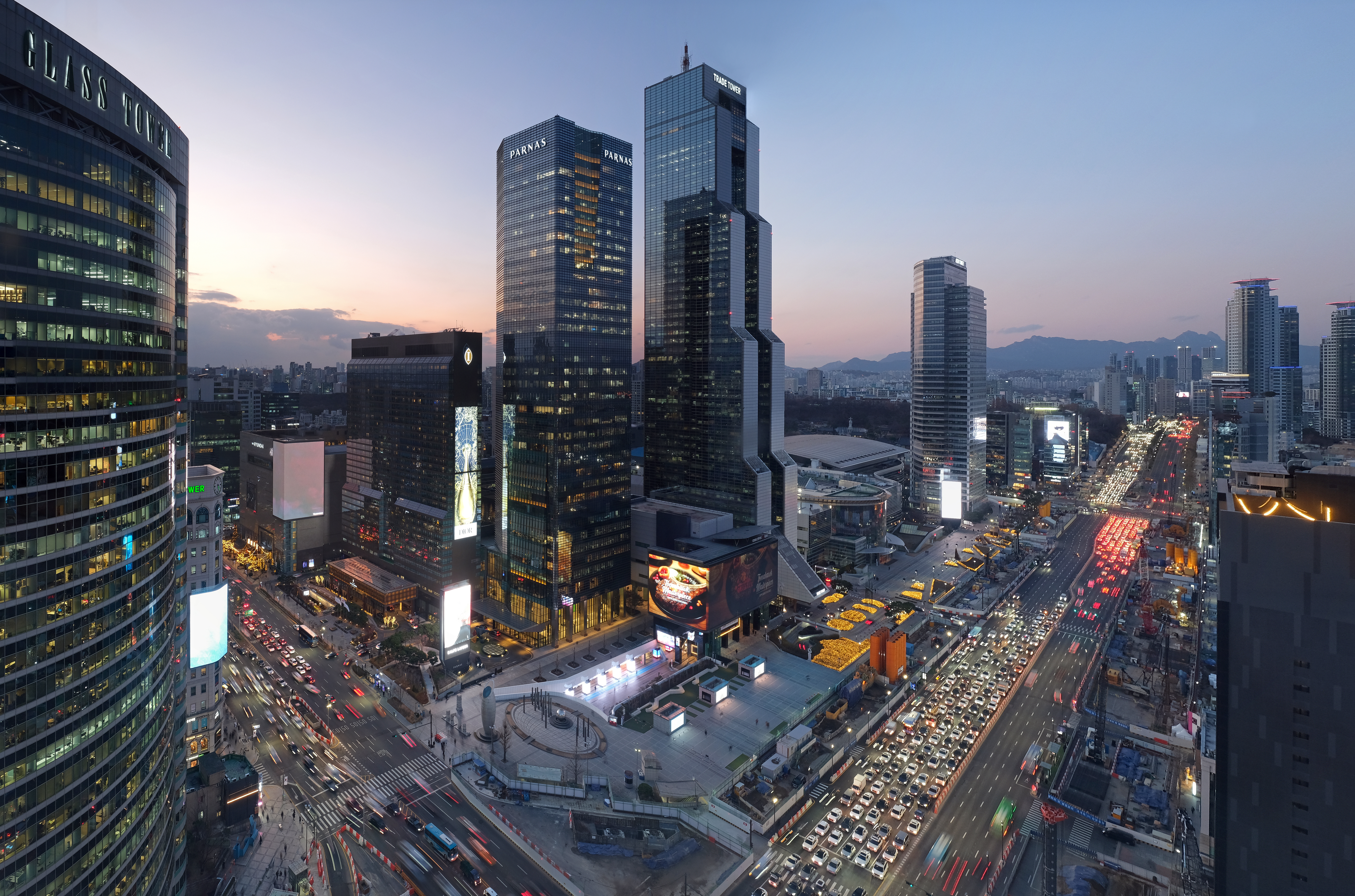
Gangnam District in Seoul

"Gangnam Style" is a South Korean neologism that refers to a lifestyle associated with the Gangnam region of Seoul, where people are trendy, hip, and exude a certain supposed class. The term was defined in Time's weekly vocabulary list as "a manner associated with lavish lifestyles in Seoul's Gangnam district". Psy likened Gangnam to Beverly Hills, California, and said in an interview that he intended the title as a joke, claiming that he has "Gangnam Style" when everything about the song, dance, looks, and music video is far from high class:

People who are actually from Gangnam never proclaim that they are—it's only the posers and wannabes that put on these airs and say that they are "Gangnam Style"—so this song is actually poking fun at those kinds of people who are trying very hard to be something that they're not.

The song talks about "the perfect girlfriend who knows when to be refined and when to get wild" The song's refrain "오빤 강남 스타일 (Oppan Gangnam style)" has been translated as "Big brother is Gangnam style," with Psy referring to himself. During an interview with The New York Times, Psy revealed that South Korean fans have high expectations about his dancing, so he felt a lot of pressure. In order to keep up with those expectations, he studied hard to find something new and stayed up late for about 30 nights to come up with the "Gangnam Style" dance. Along the way, he had tested various "cheesy" animal-inspired dance moves with his choreographer Lee Ju-sun, including panda and kangaroo moves, before settling for the horse trot, which involves pretending to ride a horse, alternately holding the reins and spinning a lasso, and moving into a legs-shuffling side gallop.

During an interview with Reuters, Psy said that "Gangnam Style" was originally produced only for local K-pop fans. On July 11, 2012, Psy and his music label YG Entertainment started releasing several promotional teasers for "Gangnam Style" to their subscribers on YouTube. Four days later, the full music video of "Gangnam Style" was uploaded onto YouTube and was immediately a sensation, receiving about 500,000 views on its first day. However, at the time of its release in Germany, a dispute between YouTube and the GEMA (the country's performance rights organization) regarding copyright issues led to thousands of music videos including "Gangnam Style" being blocked in the country. The music video, along with other music videos from GEMA-protected artists released on YouTube, were unblocked in Germany on October 31, 2016, after YouTube reached an agreement with GEMA on copyrights and royalties.

Search volume for K-pop since 2008 according to Google Trends

According to the news agency Agence France-Presse, the success of "Gangnam Style" could be considered as part of the Korean Wave, a term coined by Chinese journalists to refer to the significant increase in the popularity of South Korean entertainment and culture since the late 1990s.

South Korean popular music (K-pop), considered by some to be the most important aspect of the Korean Wave, is a music genre that relies on cultural technology to adapt to the tastes of foreign audiences and has now grown into a popular subculture among teenagers and young adults in many places around the world. Although it has spread to the Middle East, Eastern Europe, and parts of South America, its reception in the Western world was initially lukewarm. However, booming social media networks such as YouTube, Facebook, and Twitter made it easier for K-pop musicians to reach a wider audience in the West, and the song and video soon became a global phenomenon.

== Reception ==
The song has received mixed to positive ratings from music critics. Music journalist Bill Lamb from About.com praised the song for "spreading smiles and pure fun around the world in record time." He then writes, "take one part LMFAO's synth-based party music, another part Ricky Martin's Latin dance party and the rest a powerfully charismatic South Korean showman and you have the first worldwide K-Pop smash hit." Billboard K-Town columnist Jeff Benjamin became one of the first music critics to review the song when he published an article and reported that "Gangnam Style" has gone viral on the Internet. In his article, Benjamin introduced the reader to a couple of popular K-pop songs and wrote that "'Gangnam Style' in particular, plays all the right moves sonically while "borrowing from LMFAO along the way."

Hallie Sekoff of The Huffington Post quoted from the video's official YouTube video description that the song is characterized by its "strongly addictive beats," and wrote that this is not too far-fetched, considering "how obsessed we've found ourselves." Then London's mayor Boris Johnson considered the song to be the greatest cultural masterpiece of 2012.

Despite its popularity, a few music critics including Robert Copsey from Digital Spy criticized the song for being monotonous. Copsey wrote that "you could slap an LMFAO tag on the cover and few would know the difference", and Paul Lester of The Guardian similarly labeled it as "generic ravey Euro dance with guitars." Lester described the song as "Pump Up the Jam meets the Macarena with a dash of Cotton Eye Joe," while Robert Myers of The Village Voice dismissed "Gangnam Style" as an "inspired piece of silliness."

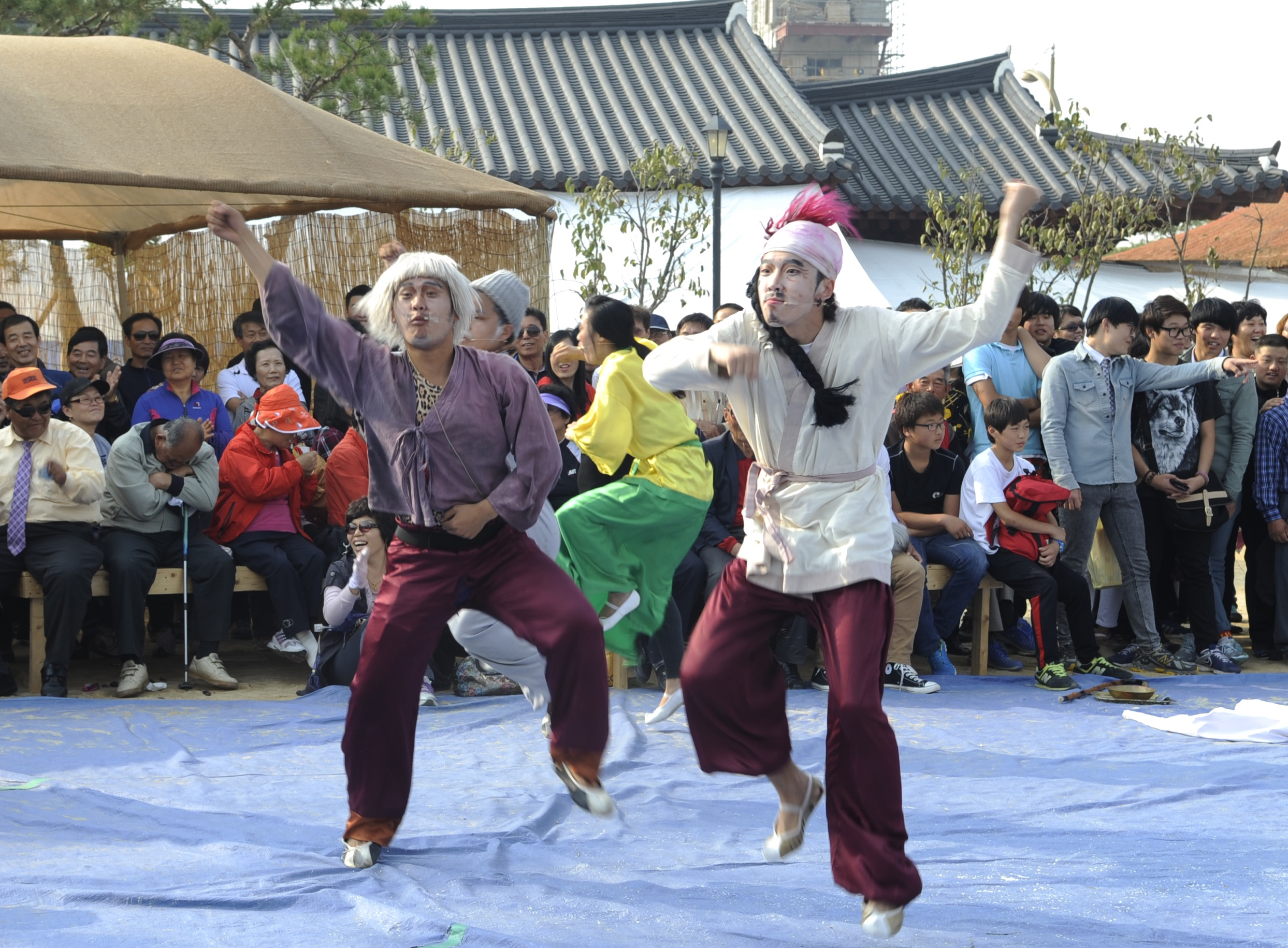
Dancers performing "Gangnam Style" at the Gimje Horizon Festival

Cha Woo-jin, a South Korean music critic, told The Chosun Ilbo that "Gangnam Style"'s sophisticated rendering and arrangement has made it very appealing to the general public. Choe Kwang-shik, the South Korean Minister of Culture, Sports and Tourism, told reporters that "Gangnam Style" had played an important role in introducing the South Korean culture, language, and lifestyle to the rest of the world. However, some have criticized the song for failing to accurately represent South Korean culture. Oh Young-Jin, managing editor of The Korea Times, wrote that the dance has more to do with Americans than South Koreans.

In Japan, the song was met with considerable criticism. When "Gangnam Style" first appeared in Japanese TV shows in July, the reaction from viewers was negative. As a result, Psy's Japanese record label YGEX canceled a previously planned Japanese-language re-release of "Gangnam Style." According to The Dong-A Ilbo, a South Korean newspaper, the song's lukewarm reception in Japan could have been caused by a diplomatic conflict between the two countries, and the newspaper accused the Japanese media of keeping its people "in the dark." However, Jun Takaku of the Japanese daily newspaper Asahi Shimbun explained that "Gangnam Style" had caused "barely a ripple in Japan" because Psy does not conform to the image of other "traditionally polished" K-pop acts popular in Japan such as Girls' Generation and TVXQ. Erica Ho from Time magazine similarly noted that, despite the K-pop musical genre being very popular in Japan, the country seemed to be "immune to PSY Mania", and she advised her readers who dislike the song to "pack your bags for Japan."

Immediately after its release, "Gangnam Style" was mentioned by various English-language websites providing coverage of South Korean pop culture for international fans, including Allkpop and Soompi. Simon Stawski and Martina Sazunic, a Canadian couple living in Seoul who were among the first to parody "Gangnam Style" in late July, wrote that the song has the potential to become "one of the biggest songs of the year." However, during an interview with Al Jazeera a few weeks later, Martina Sazunic claimed that the worldwide popularity of "Gangnam Style" has been viewed negatively by some K-pop fans, because "they [the fans] didn't want K-pop being liked by other people who don't understand K-Pop."

=== Music video ===
The music video of "Gangnam Style" has been met with positive responses and praises from the music industry and the commentators, who drew attention to its tone and dance moves, though some found them vulgar. Another notable aspect that helped popularize the video was its comical dance moves that can be easily copied, such as the pelvic thrust during the elevator scene. The United Nations hailed Psy as an "international sensation" because of the popularity of his "satirical" video clip and its "horse-riding-like dance moves." As such, the music video spawned a dance craze unseen since the Macarena of the mid-1990s.

The World Bank's lead economist David McKenzie remarked that some of Psy's dance moves "kind of look like a regression discontinuity," while the space agency NASA called "Gangnam Style" a dance-filled music video that has forever entered the hearts and minds of millions of people. Melissa Locker of Time noted that "it's hard not to watch again ... and again ... and again," while CNN reporter Shanon Cook told the audience that she had watched "Gangnam Style" about 15 times.

The German news magazine Der Spiegel attributed the popularity of "Gangnam Style" to its daring dance moves, a sentiment similarly voiced by Maura Judkis of The Washington Post, who wrote, "'Gangnam Style' has made an extraordinarily stupid-looking dance move suddenly cool." The video was also positively reviewed by Steve Knopper from Rolling Stone, who called "Gangnam Style" an astoundingly great K-pop video that has all the best elements of hypnotically weird one-hit wonders and hopes that "PSY gets filthy rich from this."

Mesfin Fekadu of the Associated Press wrote that Psy's dance moves are "somewhat bizarre" but the music video is full of colorful, lively outfits. Matt Buchanan and Scott Ellis of The Sydney Morning Herald wrote that the video "makes no sense at all to most Western eyes" and it "makes you wonder if you have accidentally taken someone else's medication" whereas Deborah Netburn of the Los Angeles Times called it "one of the greatest videos ever to be uploaded to YouTube." Kim Alessi from Common Sense Media considered the music video for "Gangnam Style" worth seeing for its caricature of contemporary Asian and American urban lifestyles, but also warned that "Gangnam Style" contains sexually suggestive images and "degrading messages" which could be inappropriate for children and teenagers.

== Music video ==
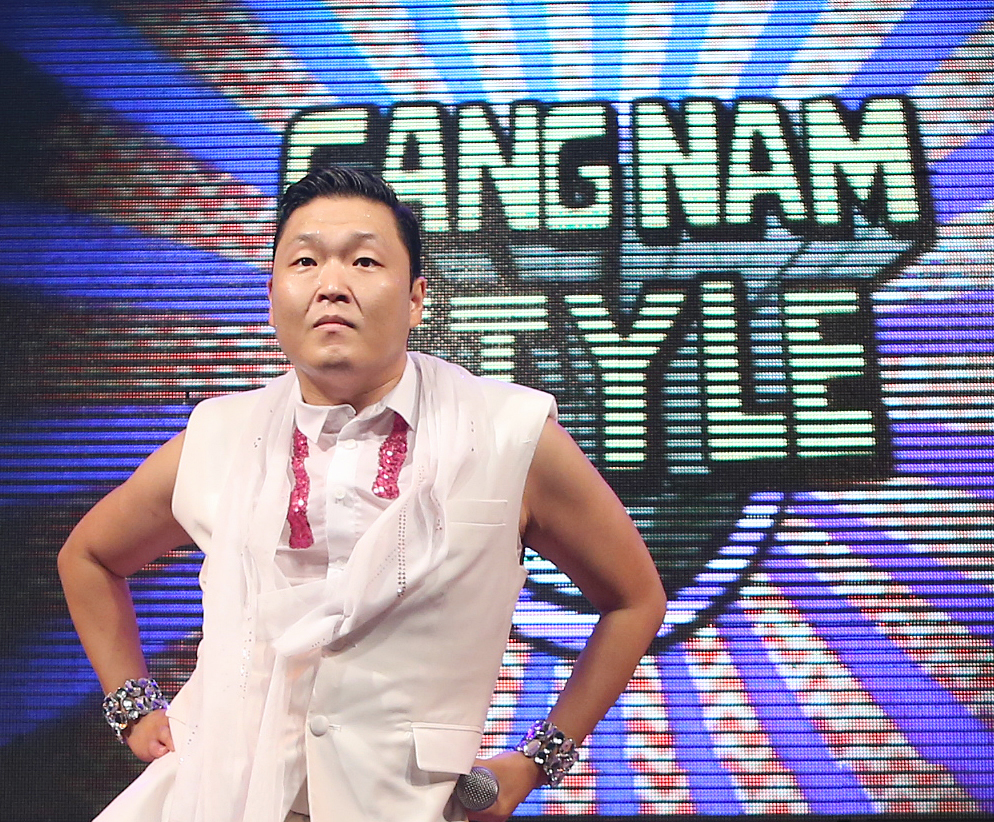
Psy with the "Gangnam Style" logo in September 2012

The video begins with Psy, who is lounging at what looks like a sandy beach, under a sun umbrella and holding a cold drink, but the camera zooms out to reveal he is actually at a playground. The video then alternates between the playground, where a boy (Hwang Min-woo) dances next to him; and a row of horses, who are in stalls, where Psy performs his signature "invisible horse dance." As Psy (and two women) walk through a parking garage, they are pelted by pieces of newspaper, trash, and snow. At a sauna, he rests his head on a man's shoulder, dressed in blue, while another man covered in tattoos is stretching. He then sings in front of two men (then labelmates under YG Entertainment, Big Bang's Daesung and Seungri, dressed as older men) playing Janggi (Korean chess), dances with a woman at a tennis court, and bounces around on a tour bus of seniors. The scenes alternate quickly until there is an explosion near the chess players, causing them to dive off the bench. Psy immediately walks toward the camera, pointing and shouting "Oppa Gangnam Style." The chorus starts as he and some dancers perform at a horse stable. He dances as two women walk backwards. He dances at the tennis court, a carousel, and the tour bus. He shuffles into an outdoor yoga session and on a boat. The camera zooms in on a woman's butt, then shows Psy "yelling" at it.

The chorus ends and he is seen in a parking garage, where Psy is approached by a man (Yoo Jae-suk) in a yellow suit who steps out of a red Mercedes-Benz SLK 200; they have a dance duel. Psy then appears in an elevator underneath a man (Noh Hong-Chul) who is straddling him and thrusting his pelvis. The man in the yellow suit then gets in his car and leaves. The camera pans and it shows Psy in the subway station, where he boards the train and notices Hyuna (who would have her own version of the song) dancing. At one of the train stops, he approaches the woman in slow motion, and she approaches him. They start to embrace. He then tells the woman "Oppa Gangnam Style," and they horse dance along with some other dancers at the train stop, commencing the second chorus. He also surfaces from a spa hot tub. In the Rolling Stone interview, Psy says he copied the spa surfacing scene from Lady Gaga's video ("Poker Face").

Psy sings to the woman at a night club as people in various costumes walk behind them. He raps in a serious tone in an enclosed space, but when he says "You know what I'm saying" the camera zooms out, and it is revealed that he is actually sitting on a toilet with his pants down. Psy, the woman, and the group of people in costumes do the horse dance and strike a final pose. After a brief reprise of the dance duel, the video finishes with a cartoon graphic of Psy at the stable.

=== Production ===
The music video is directed by Cho Soo-hyun, who later directed the video for Psy's follow-up single "Gentleman" and the video for "This Love" by Shinhwa. It shows Psy performing a comical horse-riding dance and appearing in unexpected locations around the Gangnam District, such as an outdoor yoga session and a hot tub. He wears several distinctive suits and black sunglasses with a mindset of "dress classy and dance cheesy." It features a "skewering [of] the Gangnam image" by the "non-Gangnam Psy"; this parody would be recognizable to viewers familiar with South Korean culture. Although there are more than ten different locations featured, only two of the scenes are filmed in the Gangnam district proper. The sauna scene, elevator scene, and bathroom scene were filmed elsewhere in the greater Seoul region, and some shots were filmed in World Trade Center Seoul and the Songdo International Business District, which includes Songdo Central Park and International Business District Station. The video was shot over 48 hours in July 2012.

In K-pop, it is routine to have cameos by celebrities in a music video, such as in the dance scenes in the elevator and the parking garage. Guest appearances in the music video include:

- 4Minute member Hyuna, who dances in the subway car and attracts Psy's attention.
- Hwang Min-woo, a 7-year-old boy who dances at the beginning of the video. During an interview with CNN, Psy stated that "the night before the music video shoot, I was watching Korea's Got Talent and saw him dance to Michael Jackson. His moves were ridiculous. So we called him up and asked him to be in the music video, which was shooting the very next day, and he came and it all worked out." He has been praised for his eye-catching dance moves that have received a lot of attention from viewers.
- Comedian/television personality Korea's Nation MC Yoo Jae-suk, who engages in a dance duel with Psy.
- Comedian/television personality Noh Hongchul, who does his trademark pelvis-thrusting dance in an elevator while Psy raps underneath him.

== Viral spread ==
Following its July 15, 2012 release, "Gangnam Style" overtook Carly Rae Jepsen's "Call Me Maybe" to reach the number one position on the YouTube Top 100 Music Videos during the week of August 28, 2012. On September 1, it overtook Girls' Generation's "Gee" to become the most viewed K-pop video on YouTube. Although "Call Me Maybe" had unusually strong staying power, averaging over 1.5 million views each day, "Gangnam Style" increased to an average of over nine million views per day within just two months. This was mainly because "Call Me Maybe" remained largely a North American trend, whereas the popularity of "Gangnam Style" was not confined to the United States. 61.6 percent of viewers were male, and those aged between 13 and 17 represented the biggest group.

According to The Wall Street Journal, T-Pain was among the first to have "sent [the video] to the stratosphere" when he tweeted about it on July 29, 2012. The next day, it was then picked up by Neetzan Zimmerman from the social blog Gawker, who asked: "Did this underground Hip Hop artist from South Korea just release the Best Music Video of the Year?" This was soon followed by Robbie Williams, Britney Spears, Katy Perry, Tom Cruise, Joseph Gordon-Levitt, and William Gibson.

The earliest video to catch the attention of media networks outside South Korea was "Psy Gangnam Style MV Reaction," which was uploaded by Katie and Mindy Anderson on July 18, 2012. The Andersons were subsequently interviewed by Evan Ramstad from The Wall Street Journal a few weeks later. In his article published on August 6, 2012, Ramstad also included "Kpop Music Mondays : PSY Gangnam Style," a review and parody of "Gangnam Style" uploaded on July 23 by K-pop video bloggers Simon Stawski and Martina Sazunic, a Canadian couple living in Seoul. This makes the Stawskis' video the earliest parody featured in an American newspaper. On August 8, 2012, Ramstad appeared on WSJ Live, and he mentioned the Andersons and the Stawskis again, before claiming that "a lot of Koreans are also making their own parodies of 'Gangnam Style.'"

On September 3, 2012, the number of daily views generated by "Gangnam Style" went past the 5-million mark. By the end of September, it had topped the iTunes charts in 31 countries.

"Gangnam Style" reached the unprecedented milestone of 1 billion YouTube views on December 21, 2012. YouTube specially marked the video's accomplishments with a cartoon dancing Psy animated icon, added first by the site logo, and later next to the video's view counter when it exceeded 1 billion views. On April 6, 2013, the YouTube video reached 1.5 billion views.

== Cultural impact ==
NASA staff performing the "Gangnam Style" dance at the Johnson Space Center

After the release of "Gangnam Style," the American talent manager Scooter Braun, who discovered Justin Bieber on YouTube, asked on Twitter "How did I not sign this guy [Psy]?" Soon afterward, it was reported that Psy had left for Los Angeles to meet with representatives of Justin Bieber, to explore collaboration opportunities. On September 3, 2012, Braun made a public announcement that was later uploaded onto YouTube, saying that he and Psy have decided to "make some history together. [To] be the first Korean artist to break a big record in the United States." The next day, it was confirmed that Psy was signed to Braun's School Boy Records.

The music video for the song went viral and became an Internet meme. Although Psy attributed the song's popularity to YouTube and his fans while at the same time insisted that he is not responsible for the song's success, the South Korean Ministry of Culture, Sports and Tourism recognized the singer for "increasing the world's interest in Korea" and announced its decision to award Psy with a 4th Class Order of Cultural Merit. The phrase "Oppan Gangnam Style" was entered into The Yale Book of Quotations as one of the most famous quotes of 2012.

=== Social ===
As the song's popularity continued to rise, it caused the share price of the song's music label YG Entertainment to gain as much as 50% on the Korea Exchange. DI Corporation, whose executive chairman Park Won-ho is Psy's father, saw its share price increase by 568.8% within a few months of the song's release despite making a year-over-year loss. Soon, "Gangnam Style" began to attract the attention of several business and political leaders, including UN Secretary-General Ban Ki-moon who recognized the song as a "force for world peace." During his meeting with Psy at the United Nations Headquarters, he commented, "We have tough negotiations in the United Nations. In such a case I was also thinking of playing Gangnam Style-dance so that everybody would stop and dance. Maybe you can bring UN style."

UN Secretary-General Ban Ki-moon performs the "Gangnam Style" dance with Psy.

Through social networks like Facebook, many small, unofficial fan-organized flash mobs have been held in universities and colleges throughout the world. The earliest flash mobs were held in Pasadena, California, and Sydney, Australia. On September 12, 2012, Times Square in Manhattan was filled with a dance mob dancing to the music of "Gangnam Style" during ABC's Good Morning America. Major flash mobs (those with more than 1,000 participants) were also held in Seoul (South Korea), South Sulawesi (Indonesia), Palermo (Italy), Milan (Italy), and Paris (France).

Top 5 "Gangnam Style" dance mobs with most participants
Date	Location	Country	Participants
October 6, 2012	Seoul	South Korea	15,000
October 14, 2012	Makassar, South Sulawesi	Indonesia	12,000
October 21, 2012	Piazza del Duomo, Milan	Italy	20,000
November 5, 2012	Jardins du Trocadéro, Paris	France	20,000
November 10, 2012	Piazza del Popolo, Rome	Italy	15,000

The song has been mentioned in tweets by the United Nations, the United Nations Children's Fund, and the American space agency NASA; by a reporter during a U.S. State Department briefing; and referenced by the president of the International Criminal Court Song Sang-Hyun during his speech in front of the UN Security Council. On October 9, the mayor of London Boris Johnson held a speech at the 2012 Conservative Party Conference where he told the audience that he and the British Prime Minister David Cameron have danced "Gangnam Style." During a Google Earnings call, Larry Page, the CEO and co-founder of Google, hailed the song as a glimpse of the future of worldwide distribution through YouTube.

The American Council on Exercise estimated that dancing "Gangnam Style" will burn 150–200 calories per half-hour. Swype, an input method for Android operating systems, included "Gangnam Style" in its list of recognized words and phrases. U.S. President Barack Obama revealed possible plans to privately perform "Gangnam Style" for his spouse Michelle Obama. In November 2012, a Māori cultural group from Rotorua performed a version of the Gangnam Style dance mixed with a traditional Māori haka in Seoul, celebrating 50 years of diplomatic relations between South Korea and New Zealand.

In Thailand, officials from the Dan Sai municipality in Loei Province shot a video of people wearing masks and performing "Gangnam Style" during the Phi Ta Khon "ghost" festival. According to the Thai newspaper The Nation, villagers and spiritual leaders from Loei province felt "uneasy" and also "greatly offended" about this "Gangnam Style" performance which tarnishes the image of a 400-year-old tradition. Another controversial incident was sparked by a "Gangnam Style" parody by officers from the Royal Thai Navy, which was not well received by some high-ranking commanders. Although Vice Admiral Tharathorn Kajitsuwan from the Third Naval Area Command insisted that "we had no intention to insult or make fun of navy officers in uniform," some senior officers called it "improper." Kajitsuwan claimed that his subordinates had the right to upload the video to YouTube, although he did not expect them to do so. On October 1, 2012, he issued an apology to his colleagues. Commander Surasak Rounroengrom believed an investigation was unnecessary because the video caused no damage to the navy, but he admitted that there was some impropriety about military officers doing their "fancy stepping in uniform."

=== Political and environmental activism ===
On September 18, 2012, the North Korean government became the first to use "Gangnam Style" for political activism when it uploaded a parody with the title "I'm Yushin style!" onto the government website Uriminzokkiri. The parody mocks the South Korean ruling conservative party president-elect Park Geun-hye. It shows a Photoshopped image of the presidential candidate performing the dance moves of "Gangnam Style" and labels her as a devoted admirer of the Yushin system of autocratic rule set up by her father, Park Chung Hee. A few weeks later, "草泥马 style" (literally, "Grass Mud Horse Style"; the Chinese characters are a homonym for a vulgar slur) was uploaded onto YouTube and other Chinese websites by the political activist and dissident Ai Weiwei. In his parody, Ai Weiwei dances "Gangnam Style" with a pair of handcuffs as a symbol of his arrest by Chinese authorities in 2011. According to the Associated Press, government authorities had removed the video from almost all Chinese websites the next day.

South Korean President Park Geun-hye took office on February 25, 2013. At her inauguration, Psy performed "Gangnam Style" and "Champion", one of his first hits in his native country. In order to show his solidarity with Ai Weiwei and to advocate freedom of expression, the British sculptor Anish Kapoor produced the video Gangnam for Freedom, which features other prominent British artists as well as human rights activists from various international organisations including Index on Censorship and Amnesty International. A few days prior, the global grassroots network Students for a Free Tibet had uploaded a parody of "Gangnam Style" to show its support for the Tibetan independence movement. According to Max Fisher from The Washington Post, this parody of "Gangnam Style" was likely filmed in Dharamshala, the home of Tibet's government-in-exile in the northern Indian state of Himachal Pradesh.

Greenpeace announced that it was "Going Gangnam, Greenpeace Style" in order to raise public awareness about illegal and unsustainable fishing practices off the coast of Mozambique. Activists from Greenpeace had parodied "Gangnam Style" on board the organization's excursion yacht Rainbow Warrior.

GCF Songdo Style

Songdo, a ubiquitous city 40 miles (65 km) west of Gangnam, was among five cities vying for the right to host the Green Climate Fund (GCF), a project developed by the United Nations Framework Convention on Climate Change to channel $100 billion a year from developed countries to help developing countries combat climate change. During its campaign to win the right to host the GCF, the country's Presidential Committee on Green Growth produced a promotional video entitled "GCF Songdo Style by Psy" in which Psy recommends Songdo as the host city for the GCF. He announces that a "new paradigm" will begin at Songdo with the GCF and the video heralds "The beginning of Songdo Style" while "Gangnam Style" plays in the background. On October 20, 2012, the board of the GCF announced that Songdo had won the right to host the fund.

In December 2012, the Department of Health in the Philippines launched a "Gangnam Style" dance campaign against the use of firecrackers to celebrate the New Year. Janine Tugonon, 2012 Miss Universe first runner-up, joined and danced in one of their campaigns at Pandacan, Manila. According to the department's assistant secretary, Dr. Eric Tayag, the popularity of the song will attract people especially children to use safer means of celebration such as dancing to "Gangnam Style". In contrast, the Philippine National Police was confirming intelligence reports about a firecracker named "Gangnam bomb," which was supposedly produced by illegal firecracker makers in Bocaue, Bulacan and apparently riding on the popularity of the song. According to Chief Superintendent Raul Petrasanta, director of the Firearms and Explosives Office of the Philippine National Police, he did not know what the possibly dangerous "Gangnam bomb" looks like.

Muhammad Rahim al Afghani, a close associate of Osama bin Laden currently held at the Guantanamo Bay detention camp, used the song to demonstrate his ability to gain access to popular cultural trends despite being confined within a top secret prison. In a letter to his lawyer, Muhammad wrote, "I like this new song Gangnam Style. I want to do the dance for you but cannot because of my shackles."

=== Other parodies and covers ===
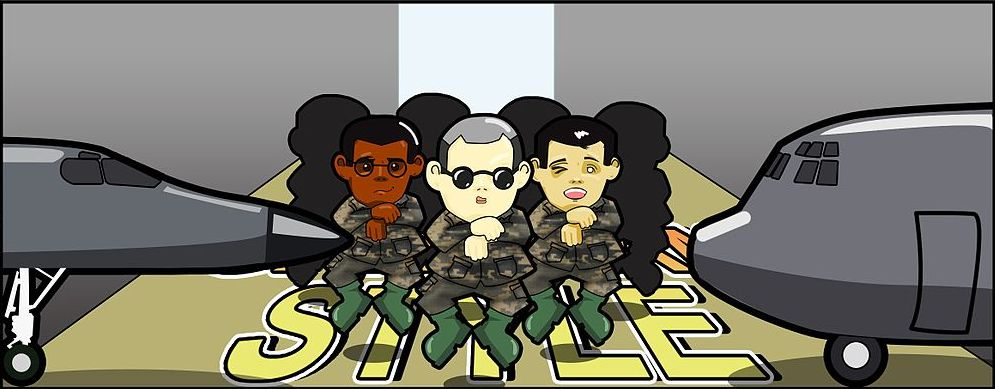
"Gangnam Style" as parodied in a comic strip published by Dyess AFB, an airbase of the U.S. Air Force

Reaction videos and parodies have been made for or with the music respectively. Some of these user generated videos have received international media recognition. "Gangnam Style"-related videos and parodies have also been uploaded by the CPDRC Dancing Inmates, Rucka Rucka Ali, Cody Simpson, Seungri, Latino, Fine Brothers, WAVEYA Dance Group, Barely Political, and the Tampa Bay Buccaneers Cheerleaders.

Numerous parodies have been spawned on college campuses. The Massachusetts Institute of Technology's version ("MIT Gangnam Style") featured Donald Sadoway, recognized in Time magazine as one of 2012 "Top 100 Most Influential People in the World"; Eric Lander, who is co-chairman of President Barack Obama's Council of Advisors on Science and Technology; and linguistics pioneer Noam Chomsky. The Maccabeats, an a cappella group from Yeshiva University, parodied the song as "What's Next? Sukkos Style?" with group members waving the four species. In addition, there have been parodies from The Ohio University Marching 110, York University, McMaster University, University of Illinois at Urbana–Champaign, Boston University, Dartmouth College, Stanford University Eton College, and the University of Michigan.

The American space agency NASA uploaded an educational parody shot by its students at its Mission Control Center in Houston, Texas. The video features cameo appearances by astronauts Tracy Caldwell Dyson, Mike Massimino, Michael Coats, Ellen Ochoa, and the International Space Station's Expedition 15 flight engineer Clayton Anderson, who dances "Gangnam Style" halfway through the video. Shortly after its upload, the parody was retweeted by the European Space Agency and the SETI Institute.

The song was also parodied by cadets from the United States Military Academy, United States Merchant Marine Academy, United States Naval Academy, United States Air Force Academy, and the Royal Military College of Canada; soldiers from the 210th Fires Brigade, the 2nd Infantry Division, service members from an undisclosed unit and location in Afghanistan, and service members from the China Coast Guard's Jiangsu division, as well as high-ranking officers from the Royal Thai Navy. CollegeHumor uploaded "Mitt Romney Style," while What's Trending uploaded "Obama Style." During the two weeks before August 7, 2012, nearly 1,000 videos with the word "Gangnam" in the title were uploaded onto YouTube.

The Portuguese public broadcaster RTP1 spoofed the song in its late-night show 5 Para A Meia-Noite as Gamar com Style, sung by the comedian Pedro "Pacheco" Fernandes, criticizing the Prime Minister Pedro Passos Coelho, the European Union, the IMF, and the 2010–13 Portuguese financial crisis. There are many "Gangnam Style" parodies used for education. One such parody includes "Conjugation Style," a parody used to teach students about the conjugation of -er verbs in the French language. YouTube comedian cs188 uploaded a YouTube poop of the song's iconic video, called "[PSYTP] Oppa Goddamn Style." The video has received more than 15 million views since its upload on October 11, 2012.

== Live performances ==
=== Asia ===
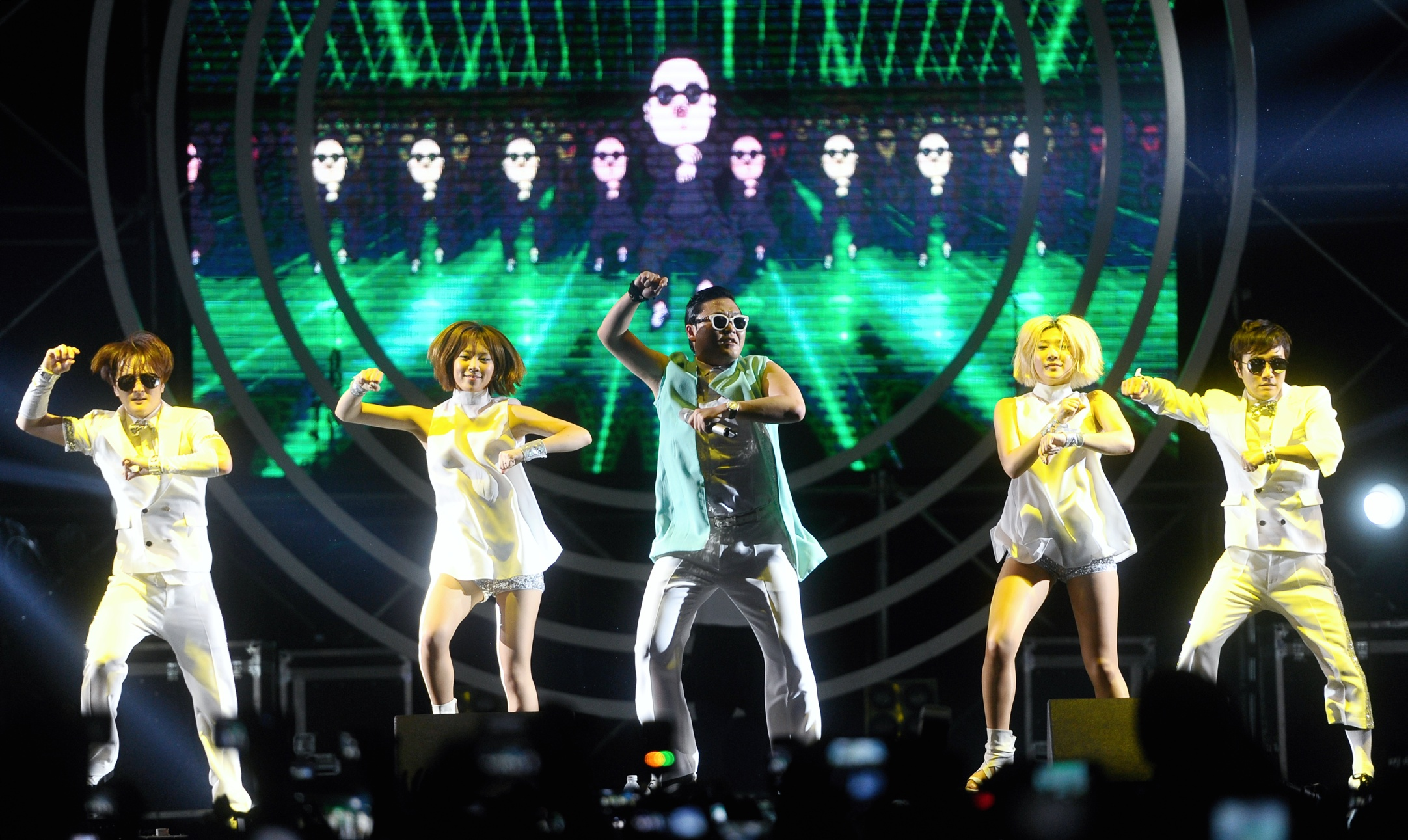
Psy performing "Gangnam Style" during Future Music Festival Asia 2013 at Sepang

Following the release of "Gangnam Style," Psy made several performances on television and at concerts in Korea. Early performances included his appearance on the weekly South Korean music program, The Music Trend. Psy also performed at several concerts prior to his departure to the United States, including during "The Heumbbeok Show" and the Summer Stand Concert in Seoul. After returning to South Korea, Psy performed "Gangnam Style" during a free concert that he held outside the Seoul City Hall. More than 80,000 fans attended the event, leading to the closure of part of the city center and an increase in subway operations. While Psy was in the US, it was announced that he, as ambassador of the Formula One Korean Grand Prix, would perform "Gangnam Style" at the event during the 2012 edition. At the event Psy taught Formula One drivers Mark Webber and Sebastian Vettel how to perform the dance.

On November 28, 2012, Psy visited Thailand and held his concert "Gangnam Style Thailand Extra Live" at the SCG Stadium in Muang Thong Thani, Bangkok. At the show, a part of celebration for the 85th birthday of Thai's King Bhumibol Adulyadej, he performed the song along with his other hits. During the 2012 Mnet Asian Music Awards held in Hong Kong on November 30, he performed the song on stage, joined by the video's co-star Hyuna and Yoo Jae-Seok look-alikes in yellow suits. The track was one of three-song setlist on Psy's free showcase, held at the Marina Bay Sands in Singapore on December 1, 2012.

On February 11, 2013, Psy arrived at the Malaysian state of Penang and performed "Gangnam Style" at a concert in front of more than 100,000 guests, including the Prime Minister of Malaysia Mohd Najib Abdul Razak as well as other high-ranking politicians from the country's ruling Barisan Nasional party.

=== Australia ===
In early October 2012, Psy traveled to Sydney, Australia, and performed "Gangnam Style" on The X Factor, a reality TV music competition, where Melanie Brown joined him in performing the "horse dance" on stage. The following day, he performed on breakfast TV show Sunrise in Martin Place, Sydney.

=== Europe ===
Psy's first public performance in Europe was on November 5, 2012, in France, where he and 20,000 fans danced "Gangnam Style" in front of the Eiffel Tower in Paris during a flashmob organized by NRJ Radio. Then, Psy traveled to Oxford and performed a short rendition of "Gangnam Style" with students from the Oxford Union, before moving on to the Yalding House in London where he danced "Gangnam Style" with the BBC's radio DJ Scott Mills. Shortly afterward, Psy left for Cologne and met up with the German comedian and television host Stefan Raab during the popular late-night show TV total, where Psy gave an interview and performed "Gangnam Style" for Raab. During the 2012 MTV Europe Music Awards held in Frankfurt on November 11, Psy delivered a performance of "Gangnam Style" which featured a David Hasselhoff appearance and backup dancing of Psy look-alikes.

In early 2013, Psy returned to France for the 2013 NRJ Music Awards at the Palais des Festivals et des Congrès in Cannes, where he began performing "Gangnam Style" on the red carpet before finishing the rest of the choreography on stage and leaving the ceremony with three awards.

=== North America ===
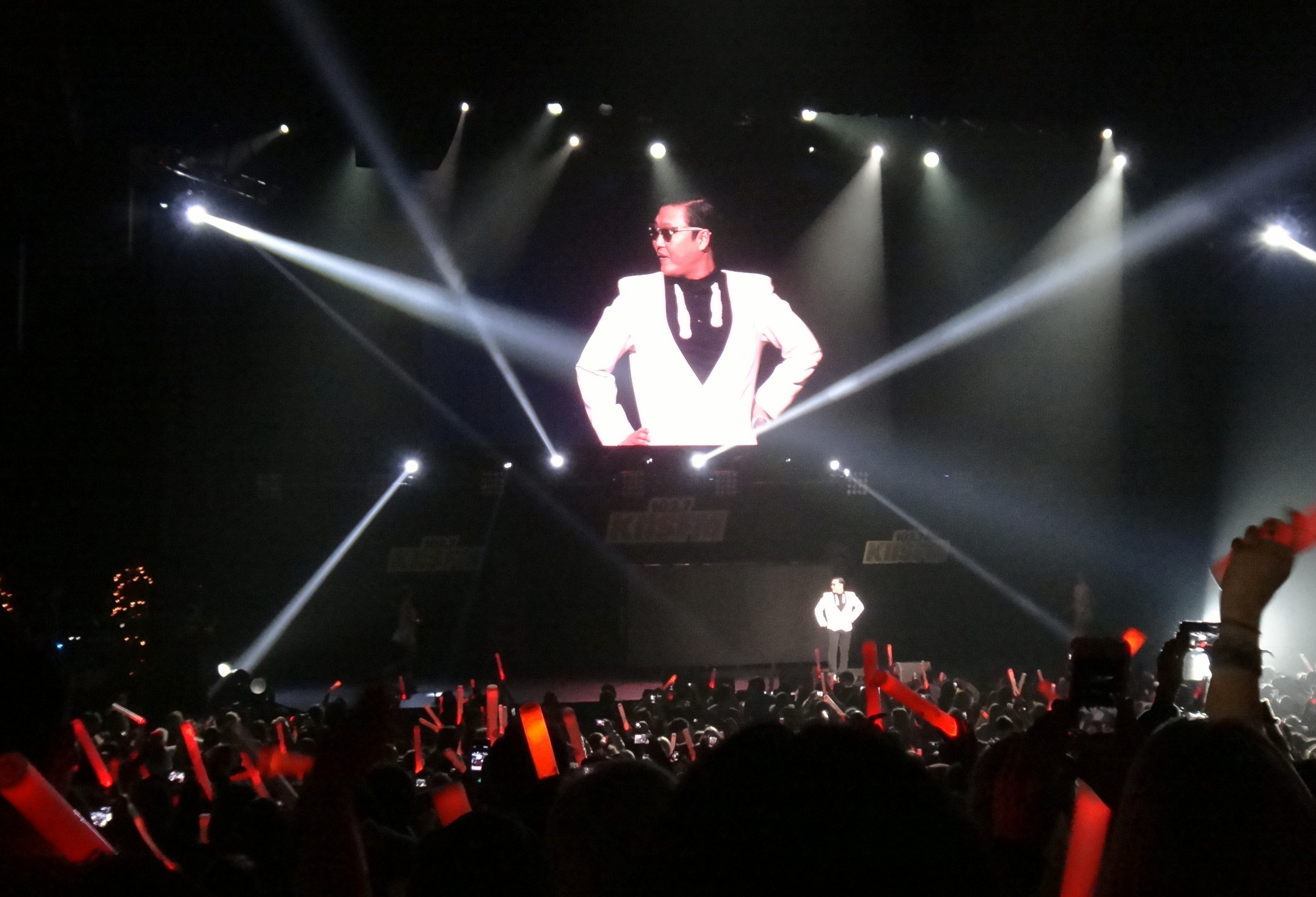
Psy performs Gangnam Style at the KIIS-FM Jingle Ball concert in Los Angeles.

Following the viral success of his music video, Psy left for the United States and performed "Gangnam Style" in various locations. On August 29, 2012, Psy posted on Twitter "Bringing #GangnamStyle to the Dodgers–Giants game this evening." Dodger Stadium presented a segment called "Psy Dance Cam" where they showed clips of the music video, followed by live shots of baseball fans dancing, and then Psy, who waves and does the dance. Two days later, Psy appeared on VH1's Big Morning Buzz Live show, and taught television hosts Carrie Keagan and Jason Dundas how to dance "Gangnam Style."

On September 26, Psy appeared at the 2012 MTV Video Music Awards performing his "Gangnam Style" dance alongside comedian Kevin Hart. After the event, he made several more appearances on US TV programs. On September 20, he appeared on The Ellen DeGeneres Show in Burbank, California, introducing himself as "Psy from Korea" before teaching Britney Spears the dance. He described the dance as "pretending to bounce like riding on an invisible horse" and when DeGeneres told Spears she would have to remove her high-heeled shoes to perform the dance, Psy protested that no, the point was "to dress classy, and dance cheesy." On September 24, he appeared on NBC's morning program Today in New York City for its Toyota Concert Series, where he performed the song and also taught the anchors the dance. The September 29, 2012, season premiere episode of Saturday Night Live featured a sketch based on the song and its video. Bobby Moynihan portrayed Psy, but was joined mid-sketch by Psy himself. He also made his second appearance on The Ellen Show's September 24 episode to perform the song along with his backup dancers. On September 28, Psy made an appearance at the iHeartRadio Music Festival to perform "Gangnam Style."

On November 14, Psy joined Madonna on stage during her concert at Madison Square Garden in New York, where they performed a mashup of the song and her 2008 hit "Give It 2 Me"; Psy later told reporters that his gig with Madonna had "topped his list of accomplishments." On November 19, Psy, who rocked out in traditional Hammer pants, closed out the 40th American Music Awards show with a performance of "Gangnam Style" joined by surprise guest MC Hammer, who brought in his own moves and Psy's horse-riding dance as the song mashed into his 1990s hit "2 Legit 2 Quit." Jason Lipshutz of Billboard wrote that "Psy's feverish rendition of 'Gangnam Style' accomplished what so few award show performances can: a palpable sense of excitement. The combination of the K-pop star and MC Hammer ... was a stroke of genius that very few could have seen coming," and chose it as the best performance of the night. The Tonight Show with Jay Leno did a special Thanksgiving broadcast with an all-military audience on November 26, and Psy appeared as the musical guest. The singer sang the song and danced alongside the soldiers, going into the crowd for part of his performance.

Psy performed "Gangnam Style" during the second night of KIIS-FM Jingle Ball concert at Nokia Theatre L.A. Live on December 3, 2012. Wearing an all-red outfit including a sparkling, sequined top, he sang the song at TNT's Christmas in Washington special, attended by the US President Barack Obama and his family, and held at the National Building Museum on December 13. Four days later, Psy performed the song at the halftime show of the NFL game between the Buffalo Bills and Seattle Seahawks in Toronto. During the Dick Clark's New Year's Rockin' Eve event at Times Square in Manhattan on December 31, 2012, more than a million people witnessed a live "Gangnam Style" performance by Psy as he was joined on stage by characters (Yoo Jae-Seok, Noh Hong-chul) from the song's video for the first part of the performance, before MC Hammer appeared to perform a mash-up of the song and 2 Legit 2 Quit".

=== South America ===
During the five-day Carnival in Rio attended by more than five million people, Psy performed "Gangnam Style" with singers Claudia Leitte and Gilberto Gil to mark the 50th anniversary of the start of Korean immigration to Brazil.

== Legacy ==
The success of "Gangnam Style" was a result of the build-up of South Korea's music industry that had been in the works for more than 20 years, and it led to other K-pop artists positioning themselves for similar breakthroughs in the U.S. music industry. Frances Moore, chief executive of the International Federation of the Phonographic Industry, brought up "Gangnam Style" as an example of how South Korea became one of the "most successful exporters of repertoire".

According to the news agency Agence France-Presse, the success of "Gangnam Style" has led to the further rise and spread of the Korean Wave to other countries. As the song continued to attract worldwide media attention, it also led to various broadcasting networks and national newspapers focusing its attention on K-pop and other aspects of Korean culture. For example, The Daily Telegraph published an article encouraging readers to try out everything from K-Pop to "K-Cars", "K-Phones" and "K-Cuisine". Kim Byoung-gi, the Korean Ambassador to Lebanon, wrote that "Gangnam Style" had helped bridge Lebanese and Korean cultures. The French-born political commentator Tim Soutphommasane, a research fellow at Monash University, agreed that the "Gangnam phenomenon" was "something worth studying". According to Soutphommasane, the world was only beginning to appreciate Gangnam Style as "part of a broader hallyu cultural wave coming out of the country [South Korea]".

In 2012, the South Korean government announced that "Gangnam Style" had brought in $13.4 million to the country's audio sector, and it subsequently launched a campaign to further expand the K-Pop music industry overseas. According to the Bank of Korea, the country's services account recorded a surplus of US$2.3 billion in the first nine months of this year, compared to a deficit of US$4.5 billion last year. This was mainly due to the growing influence and popularity of K-pop songs such as "Gangnam Style." However, American journalist John Seabrook noted that by "satirizing standard K-pop tropes in Gangnam Style", Psy may have subverted the music genre's chances of making it big in the West.

Record executives in the music industry believe that music charts will increasingly be filled with YouTube-driven globalised acts from foreign countries. Sean Carey, a research fellow in the School of Social Sciences at the University of Roehampton, wrote that the flow of popular music will no longer be a single traffic route from North America and Europe to other parts of the globe, but will also move the other way as well. According to Adam Sherwin from The Independent, the global web demand for Gangnam Style had short-circuited the "traditional reluctance" of radio stations to play foreign-language songs. The song is also underlining a shift in how money is being made in the music business. Although Psy earned more than US$60,000 from music sales of "Gangnam Style" in South Korea alone, he and his music label YG Entertainment have raked in almost US$1 million from advertisements which appear on YouTube videos identified for using "Gangnam Style" in its content. The Harvard Business Review published an article written by Kevin Evers, who explained how "Gangnam Style" had changed Billboard's ranking methodology of its music charts. Instead of relying solely on radio plays and paid purchases, Billboard started to place a heavier emphasis on digital sales and YouTube views. As a result of the change, "Gangnam Style" moved up to the top position of Billboard's Hot Rap Songs music chart. According to the British Phonographic Industry's report based on Official Charts Company sales data, thanks to "Gangnam Style" and Carly Rae Jepsen's "Call Me Maybe", pop had become the UK's favourite musical genre of the year, taking the lion's share of the singles market (38.5%) in 2012.

In 2015, a statue was placed in the Gangnam District in honor of the song.

== Track listing ==
Digital download
No.	Title	Length
1.	"Gangnam Style (강남스타일)"	3:39

Digital download – 2 Legit 2 Quit Mashup
No.	Title	Length
1.	"Gangnam Style / 2 Legit 2 Quit Mashup" (featuring MC Hammer)	3:57

Digital download – Remix EP
No.	Title	Length
1.	"Gangnam Style (강남스타일)" (featuring 2 Chainz and Tyga) (Diplo Remix)	3:25
2.	"Gangnam Style (강남스타일)" (Afrojack Remix)	6:05
3.	"Gangnam Style (강남스타일)" (Afrojack Remix) (Instrumental)	3:25
4.	"Gangnam Style (강남스타일)" (Instrumental)	3:39
Total length:		16:34

CD single
No.	Title	Length
1.	"Gangnam Style (강남스타일)"	3:39
2.	"Gangnam Style (강남스타일)" (Music Video)	4:13
Total length:		7:52

== Credits and personnel ==
Credits adapted from the EP's liner notes.

Studio

- YG Studio – recording, mixing
- Sterling Sound – mastering

Personnel

- Yang Hyun-suk – executive producer
- Psy – producer, vocals, lyrics, composition
- Yoo Gun-hyung – producer, composition, arrangement
- Han Jae-yong – recording
- Lee Kyung-joon – recording
- Jason Roberts – mixing
- Tom Coyne – mastering

== Accolades and records ==
Awards and nominations
Year	Organization	Award	Result	Ref.
2012	MTV Europe Music Awards	Best Video	Won	
2012	American Music Awards	New Media Honoree	Won	
2012	Mnet Asian Music Awards	Best Music Video	Won	
2012	Mnet Asian Music Awards	Song of the Year	Won	
2012	4Music Video Honours	Best Video	Nominated	
2012	Melon Music Awards	Song of the Year	Won	
2012	Capricho Awards	Internet – Viral do ano (Viral of the Year)	Won	
2013	People's Choice Awards	Favorite Music Video	Nominated	
2013	Golden Disk Awards	Digital Daesang (Grand Prize in Digital Releasing)	Won	
2013	NRJ Music Awards	Chanson Internationale de l'année (International Song of the Year)	Won	
2013	NRJ Music Awards	Clip de l'année (Music Video of the Year)	Won	
2013	NME Awards	Best Dancefloor Anthem	Nominated	
2013	Korean Music Awards	Song of the Year	Won	
2013	Korean Music Awards	Best Dance & Electronic Song	Nominated	
2013	Kids' Choice Awards	Favorite Song	Nominated	
2013	Billboard Music Awards	Top Streaming Song (Video)	Won	
2013	Billboard Music Awards	Top Rap Song	Nominated	
2013	Billboard Music Awards	Top Dance Song	Nominated	
2023	Korea Federation of Copyright Societies (Note: The Korea Federation of Copyright Societies is an association that consists of 10 organizations, including the Korea Music Copyright Association (KOMCA), the Korean Music Performers Association, the Korean Broadcasting Writers Association, and the Korea Press Foundation, and has a total of 300,000 members.)	Hall of Fame	Inducted	

Music program awards (20 total)
Program	Date	Ref.
Music Bank	August 17, 2012	
Music Bank	August 24, 2012	
Music Bank	August 31, 2012	
Music Bank	September 14, 2012	
Music Bank	September 21, 2012	
Music Bank	September 28, 2012	
Music Bank	October 5, 2012	
Music Bank	October 12, 2012	
Music Bank	October 19, 2012	
Music Bank	October 26, 2012	
Music Bank	November 2, 2012	
Music Bank	November 9, 2012	
Music Bank	November 16, 2012	
Music Bank	November 30, 2012	
Music Bank	December 21, 2012	
Music Bank	December 28, 2012	
Music Bank	January 4, 2013	
M Countdown	August 23, 2012	
M Countdown	August 30, 2012	
M Countdown	September 6, 2012	

=== Records attained ===
The song and its accompanying music video currently hold, or have attained, the following records:

- Most viewed K-pop video on YouTube – On September 1, 2012, it overtook "Gee" by the 9-member K-Pop idol-group Girls' Generation with 89 million views.
- Most liked video on YouTube – On September 13, 2012, it overtook "Party Rock Anthem" by the American electro recording duo LMFAO upon receiving 1.57 million "likes", and subsequently won its first Guinness World Record one week later.
- First K-pop song to top the UK Singles Chart – On October 6, 2012, the song reached number one of the UK singles chart and Psy became the first South Korean musician to achieve that feat.
- Most viewed video on YouTube – On November 24, 2012, it overtook "Baby" by the Canadian singer-songwriter Justin Bieber after receiving more than 803 million views.
- First video in Internet history to be viewed more than a billion times – On December 21, 2012, it acquired its billionth view at around 15:50 UTC.
- First video in Internet history to be viewed more than two billion times – On May 31, 2014, it acquired its 2 billionth view. A second dance animation was added next to the view counter. They were removed in July 2014.

=== Year-end media picks ===
"Gangnam Style" was ranked No. 25 on the Rolling Stone's 50 best songs of 2012 list and No. 8 on SPIN's 40 best songs of the year. The song also took the No. 8 spot on the 2012 Billboard 20 best K-Pop songs list by Jeff Benjamin and Jessica Oak, who commented "[the song] stands out not only for its slick, electronic production but also for its deeper critique on high-class society." According to MTV's list of the 2012 best songs, the song was ranked No. 8 with MTV news staff James Montgomery's comment: "'Gangnam' is either the track we, as a culture needed right now, or the track we, as a culture, deserved." Time magazine chose it as the second best song of 2012 after Usher's "Climax," writing "The YouTube meme, a good-natured, mind-bendingly catchy lampoon [...] turned into a global obsession." The song was one of the best songs of the year on The New York Times pop critics' list and E! Online's No. 1 pick on the top 10 pop songs of 2012 list. Digital Spy ranked the song No. 20 among the 20 best singles of the year. It was voted the 12th best single of 2012 by The Village Voice's 40th annual Pazz & Jop critics' poll. Music critic Robert Christgau placed "Gangnam Style" as the No. 2 single on his 2012 Dean's List.

The music video for "Gangnam Style" was chosen as the best music video of 2012 by Time. Melissa Locker of the magazine wrote "The catchy song paired with social satire and tongue-in-cheek vibe has spread so quickly it reminds us why videos are called viral. The video has sparked an International dance craze and catapulted Psy to international super stardom." Rolling Stone also ranked the video No. 1 on its "The Best Music Videos of 2012" list, saying "The Korean auteur [Psy] conquered the world with his 'dress classy, dance cheesy' aesthetic, blurring the line between parody and celebration." The video took No. 4 position on the Digital Spy's list of 10 top pop music videos of the year.

=== Miscellaneous ===
The music video came in first with 21% rating in the 2012 Billboard.com's readers poll, beating "Where Have You Been" by Rihanna (19%) and "Beauty and a Beat" by Justin Bieber featuring Nicki Minaj (11%). The song was the most popular song played on New Year's Eve and the most sung song on the day, leaving "Auld Lang Syne" in second place for the first time since 2005, on karaoke company Lucky Voice's online service in the United Kingdom. CNN readers picked "Gangnam Style" as the eighth best song of 2012. The Week (US edition) ranked the song's global popularity at No. 6 with the strapline "'Gangnam Style' takes over the world" on the 13 biggest pop culture moments of the year list. The phenomenon of the song and the video was also picked as one of the 2012's most viral moments in music by Wendy Geller of Yahoo! Music, and No. 2 on the 2012 top 20 music moments list after Whitney Houston's death by Billboard, being written "If there's one meme, song and face that has been truly inescapable in the second half of 2012, it's South Korean rapper Psy and his outrageous 'Gangnam Style'."

On December 1, 2014, YouTube announced that "Gangnam Style" had exceeded the number of views that are possible to store using a 32-bit signed integer, that being 2,147,483,647 (2^{31}−1, or two billion). As a result, YouTube was forced to upgrade to using 64-bit integers to store view numbers, with a maximum value of 9,223,372,036,854,775,807 (2^{63}−1, or nine quintillion). "We never thought a video would be watched in numbers greater than a 32-bit integer, but that was before we met Psy," stated a YouTube spokesperson.

With 132 beats per minute, the song was momentarily forbidden in gyms in South Korea during the COVID-19 pandemic. The country restricted music faster than 120 BPM to avoid Koreans feeling energized by the tempo of music, breathing more heavily or sweating more intensely.

== Chart performance ==
=== South Korea ===
Upon its release, "Gangnam Style" was an enormous hit. The song went straight to number one on the Gaon Singles Chart on the fourth week of July 2012, with 816,868 digital downloads, and spent five consecutive weeks at the top position of the chart, tying it with IU's "Good Day" for the most weeks at number one single in the chart's history. In addition, the song became the first-place winner on various weekly chart shows such as M Countdown (three straight weeks) and Music Bank (a total of 16 weeks including a record 10-consecutive-week). According to the Korea Music Content Industry Association, "Gangnam Style" became the best selling song of 2012 in South Korea with 3,842,109 download sales.

The song debuted at number six on the Billboard Korea K-Pop Hot 100 for the week of July 28, 2012. It then topped the chart the week after and remained at the summit for five consecutive weeks, tying IU's record with "You and I" for the longest running number one song on the chart. The record, however, was broken by Lee Seung-gi's "Return" earned six weeks at the top spot from December 2012 to January 2013. "Gangnam Style" took number one spot on the 2012 Billboard K-Pop Hot 100 year-end chart.

=== Oceania ===
In Oceania, "Gangnam Style" was a huge success. The single made its chart debut on the New Zealand Singles Chart at number 21 on September 3, 2012. After two weeks, the song reached in the top ten and the following week topped the chart, becoming the first K-pop song and the first foreign language song in three decades to achieve that feat since German band Nena's "99 Luftballons" hit the top spot in March 1982. The song remained atop the chart for two consecutive weeks before being deposed from the top spot by One Direction's "Live While We're Young." After one week of the band's reign, "Gangnam Style" regained its number one position and stayed at the top spot for a further four weeks, tallying a total of six nonconsecutive weeks atop the chart. The track was ranked in the top ten of the chart for 17 consecutive weeks before it fell to number 11 on the January 14, 2013, chart. The song has been certified 4× Platinum with sales exceeding 60,000 by the Recording Industry Association of New Zealand (RIANZ). "Gangnam Style" was the second biggest-selling single of 2012 in the country behind Carly Rae Jepsen's "Call Me Maybe."

In Australia, the song debuted at number seven on the ARIA Singles Chart on September 17, 2012, becoming the highest debut for the week. It reached number one on the chart just three weeks after its release, overtaking "Battle Scars" by Guy Sebastian featuring Lupe Fiasco, and spent six consecutive weeks at the summit, making it the second-longest running chart-topper for 2012 behind Flo Rida's "Whistle," which remained at the pole position for seven weeks. As a result, Psy became the first artist to reach number one on the chart with a foreign-language song since Las Ketchup topped the chart with "The Ketchup Song" in September 2002, and the eighth overall. In addition, "Gangnam Style" was the first Korean song to enter the chart and to climb to the top spot in Australian chart history. After the single spent the first 14 weeks in the top ten of the chart since its chart debut, it dropped to number 11 in its 15th week. The song, however, rebounded from the position to number three on the issue date of December 31, 2012. It descended to number 14 in its 18th week, ending a 16-week in the top ten, and out of the top 20 the following week, placed at number 23. It has been certified 10× Platinum by the Australian Recording Industry Association (ARIA), with sales exceeding 700,000 copies. "Gangnam Style" was placed at number two on the 2012 ARIA Singles year-end chart behind Carly Rae Jepsen's "Call Me Maybe."

=== Europe ===
In Europe, the song was successful as well, topping the charts in almost all countries. "Gangnam Style" made its first European chart appearance, entering the Danish Singles Chart at number 40 on August 3, 2012. It reached the top ten in its fifth week, and climbed to number four in its sixth. For the issue dated September 14, 2012, the song became Psy's first number one on the chart, ending the one-week reign of the Danish rock band Nephew's "Hjertestarter." The song remained at the top position for seven consecutive weeks, tying it with "Somebody That I Used to Know" performed by Gotye featuring Kimbra for the longest running number one single on the chart for 2012. In its 24th week, it climbed back to the top, giving it its 8th week in that position. The single spent 22 straight weeks in the top ten of the chart. In January 2013, the International Federation of the Phonographic Industry (IFPI Denmark) certified the single 2× Platinum, denoting sales of 60,000 copies.

The song entered the UK Singles Chart at number 196 on September 1, 2012, and in its fourth week broke into the top 40 at number 37. In its fifth week, the song reached the top five on the chart and eventually peaked at number one on the week of October 6, becoming the first-ever K-pop song to achieve that feat. While the track only remained atop the chart for one week before being overtaken by Rihanna's "Diamonds", it spent a further 17 consecutive weeks in the top ten of the chart before it fell to number twelve on the January 26, 2013, chart. The song was the sixth biggest selling single of 2012 with 878,000 sales, and ranked at number 24 among the top 40 most streamed tracks of the year in the United Kingdom. According to Official Charts Company sales data, "Gangnam Style" has become not only the 129th track to sell more than 1 million copies in the history of the UK's Official Singles Chart, but also the first million seller by an Asian music star. On April 9, 2013, the song became 13th most downloaded single ever in the UK.

Elsewhere in Europe, the song also peaked at number one on the German Singles Chart for two non-consecutive weeks in 2012. For the week of January 11, 2013, it returned to the summit, ending the ten-consecutive-week reign of "Diamonds" by Rihanna, and spent a week at the top. Psy's song remained in the top ten on the chart for a 19th straight week including 15 in the top three position since October 2012. It has been certified 5× Gold by the Bundesverband Musikindustrie (BVMI), denoting sales of 750,000 copies. In addition, the single remained number one in Austria for four nonconsecutive weeks, Belgium (Flanders) for five consecutive weeks, Belgium (Wallonia) for seven straight weeks, Czech Republic for one week, Finland for four consecutive weeks, France for six non-consecutive weeks, Italy for a week, the Netherlands for two consecutive weeks, Norway for four straight weeks, Scotland for a week, Spain for 12 consecutive weeks, and Switzerland for three nonconsecutive weeks. It additionally placed top five positions in Iceland, Ireland, and Sweden, and top ten in Hungary and Slovakia.

=== North America ===
In the United States, "Gangnam Style" debuted at number 64 the Billboard Hot 100 in the week of September 22, 2012, with 61,000 downloads sold, more than the total number of previous weeks (57,000), becoming the second K-pop song to enter the chart behind the Wonder Girls' "Nobody," which spent a week at number 76 on the October 31, 2009 chart. The following week, the song rocketed to number 11 on the chart with 188,000 downloads, seeing a sales increase of 210% after Psy appeared on various TV shows such as The Ellen DeGeneres Show and NBC's Today. In its third week, it rose to number two on the chart, topping the Hot Digital Songs chart with a 60% increase to 301,000 downloads sold and climbing to number nine on On-Demand Songs chart. After that, the song peaked at the runner-up spot for seven consecutive weeks behind Maroon 5's "One More Night," failing to gain in enough radio audience to ascend to the summit, although it ruled Hot Digital Songs for a fourth week and On-Demand Songs for a fifth week during that period. While "One More Night" dominated the Radio Songs chart for eight weeks, "Gangnam Style" peaked at just number 12 on the chart.

For the week of November 24, the song dropped to number five on the Hot 100, despite leading in sales with 188,000 downloads. In its 12th week, the single rebounded from number seven to number five with top Digital Gainer accolades, spurred by Psy's show-closing performance of the song with MC Hammer at the AMA. The track returned for a sixth week atop Hot Digital Songs with 229,000 downloads sold including 41,000 stemmed from the duet version, which mixed in Hammer's 1992 No. 5 Hot 100 hit "2 Legit 2 Quit." It was the first song to spend six weeks at number one on the Digital Songs chart without reaching the top spot on the Hot 100 since Miley Cyrus's "Party in the U.S.A." in 2009. After the song stayed in the top ten of the Hot 100 for 11 consecutive weeks, it dropped out of the top ten on the December 22, 2012, chart, falling from number 10 to number 11. The following week, "Gangnam Style" descended to number 18 on the chart but achieved the milestone of 3 million downloads sold in the country, becoming the first and only K-pop song to reach the mark. For the week of January 12, 2013, powered by consumers purchasing some of 2012's most buzzworthy hits and radio airplay recounting the same in year-end retrospectives, the song resurged from number 19 to number six with its best weekly total 400,000 downloads sold, returning to the Hot 100's top ten after three weeks out of the top ten. The track dropped to number 14 in its 18th week, ending a 12-week in the top 10, and number 22 in its 19th week, despite staying in the top ten of Digital Songs chart with 192,000 and 105,000 copies sold, respectively. On February 20, 2013, Billboard and Nielsen announced the addition of U.S. YouTube video streaming data to its platforms, which includes an update to the methodology for the Billboard Hot 100 chart. Thanks to the change to reflect online video activity, "Gangnam Style" rebounded from number 48 to number 26 on the Hot 100 for the week of March 2, 2013.

On October 11, 2012, Billboard unveiled new methodology for the Hot Rap Songs chart, including digital download sales and streaming data for the first time, along with radio airplay audience impressions as measured by Nielsen BDS. Due to this, "Gangnam Style" soared from number 20 to number one on the October 20, 2012, chart. The song spent eight consecutive weeks atop the chart before being overtaken by Flo Rida's "I Cry." After four weeks of his reign, "Gangnam Style" regained its number one position in the week of January 12, 2013. The track also peaked at number three on the Hot Dance/Club Play Songs chart in the week of November 17, 2012. The song was certified 4× Platinum by the Recording Industry Association of America (RIAA) on April 19, 2013, denoting digital download sales of 4,000,000. According to Nielsen SoundScan, "Gangnam Style" became the 9th best selling song of 2012 in the United States with 3,592,000 download sales. In late January 2013, the song topped the 4 million mark in digital sales, becoming the third comic/novelty song to reach the mark, following LMFAO's "Sexy and I Know It" and Cee Lo Green's "Fuck You!."

In Canada, "Gangnam Style" was a big hit just like the rest of the world. The song entered the Canadian Hot 100 chart at number 71 on the week of September 8, 2012. In its fourth week, it reached in the top ten of the chart, climbing to number three, and the following week hit the pole position. The single spent seven consecutive weeks atop the chart, making it the second longest running number one song of 2012 behind Maroon 5's "Payphone" remained at the top for eight straight weeks. On the week of September 12, 2012, the song debuted at number seven on the Top 20 Digital Tracks chart, based on Nielsen SoundScan data. The following week it topped the chart and spent four weeks at the top spot before giving the summit to "I Knew You Were Trouble" by Taylor Swift. "Gangnam Style," however, was back on top of the chart for the week of October 24, and grabbed the number one position for another four straight weeks, tallying a total of eight nonconsecutive weeks atop the chart. On November 16, 2012, the track was certified 4× Platinum by Music Canada, and as of January 2013 had sold more than 476,000 copies in the country.

=== iTunes Music Video Charts ===
On August 21, 2012, "Gangnam Style" charted number one on the iTunes Music Video Charts, overtaking Justin Bieber's "As Long as You Love Me" and Katy Perry's "Wide Awake"; this feat was the first for any South Korean artist. From September 8, 2012, to February 23, 2013, the song has also peaked and stayed at number one on Billboard's YouTube Chart for 22 weeks, until being surpassed by "Stay" by Rihanna for one week; as of April 2013, it had reclaimed its top position for a 30th week.

== Charts ==
=== Weekly charts ===
Weekly chart performance
Chart (2012–2013)	Peak position
Australia (ARIA)	1
Austria (Ö3 Austria Top 40)	1
Belgium (Ultratop 50 Flanders)	1
Belgium Dance (Ultratop Flanders)	1
Belgium (Ultratop 50 Wallonia)	1
Belgium Dance (Ultratop Wallonia)	1
Brazil Hot 100 Airplay (Billboard Brasil)	10
Brazil Hot Pop Songs	1
Bulgaria Airplay (IFPI)	1
Canada Hot 100 (Billboard)	1
China (Baidu 500)	1
CIS Airplay (TopHit)	7
Colombia (National-Report)	3
Czech Republic Airplay (ČNS IFPI)	1
Denmark (Tracklisten)	1
Europe (Euro Digital Songs)	1
Finland (Suomen virallinen lista)	1
France (SNEP)	1
Germany (GfK)	1
Greece Digital Songs (Billboard)	1
Honduras (Honduras Top 50)	1
Hungary (Dance Top 40)	3
Hungary (Rádiós Top 40)	6
Ireland (IRMA)	2
Israel International Airplay (Media Forest)	1
Italy (FIMI)	1
Japan Hot 100 (Billboard)	20
Lebanon (Lebanese Top 20)	1
Luxembourg (Billboard)	1
Mexico (Billboard Mexican Airplay)	1
Mexico (Monitor Latino)	1
Netherlands (Dutch Top 40)	1
Netherlands (Single Top 100)	1
New Zealand (Recorded Music NZ)	1
Norway (VG-lista)	1
Poland (Top 5 Video Airplay)	1
Poland Dance (ZPAV)	6
Portugal Digital Songs (Billboard)	1
Romania (Romanian Top 100)	42
Russia Airplay (TopHit)	7
Scottish Singles Sales (Official Charts)	1
Slovakia Airplay (ČNS IFPI)	7
Slovenia (SloTop50)	42
South Korea (Gaon)	1
South Korea (K-pop Hot 100)	1
Spain (Promusicae)	1
Sweden (Sverigetopplistan)	2
Switzerland (Schweizer Hitparade)	1
Ukrainian Airplay (TopHit)	24
UK Radio Airplay (Nielsen Soundscan)	18
UK TV Airplay (Nielsen Soundscan)	1
UK Singles (Official Charts)	1 (Note: The UK Singles Chart number-one peak position is for a sales-only chart. Data from UK's streaming chart was not added until July 2014.)
UK Streaming (Official Charts)	1
US Billboard Hot 100	2
US Pop Airplay (Billboard)	10
US Hot Rap Songs (Billboard)	1
US Dance Club Songs (Billboard)	3
US Hot Dance/Electronic Songs (Billboard)	4
US Adult Pop Airplay (Billboard)	32
Venezuela Top 100 (Record Report)	47

=== Monthly charts ===
2012 monthly chart performance for "Gangnam Style"
Chart (2012)	Peak position
CIS Airplay (TopHit)	9
Perú (UNIMPRO)	1
Russia Airplay (TopHit)	9
Ukraine Airplay (TopHit)	31

2013 monthly chart performance for "Gangnam Style"
Chart (2013)	Peak position
CIS Airplay (TopHit)	74
Russia Airplay (TopHit)	97
Ukraine Airplay (TopHit)	48

=== Year-end charts ===
2012 year-end chart performance for "Gangnam Style"
Chart (2012)	Position
Australia (ARIA)	2
Austria (Ö3 Austria Top 40)	13
Belgium (Ultratop 50 Flanders)	7
Belgium (Ultratop 40 Wallonia)	10
Brazil (Crowley)	45
Canada (Canadian Hot 100)	37
CIS Airplay (TopHit)	66
Denmark (Hitlisten)	3
Finland (Suomen virallinen lista)	5
France (SNEP)	4
Germany (Media Control AG)	8
Hungary (Dance Top 40)	39
Hungary (Rádiós Top 40)	54
Iceland (Tónlist)	25
Israel (Media Forest Radio Airplay)	31
Italy (FIMI)	13
Netherlands (Dutch Top 40)	13
Netherlands (Mega Single Top 100)	5
New Zealand (NZ Top 40 Chart)	2
Poland (ZPAV)	4
Russia (2M Top 25 Digital Tracks)	6
Russia Airplay (TopHit)	66
South Korea (K-pop Hot 100)	1
Spain (PROMUSICAE Top 50 Canciones)	13
Sweden (Sverigetopplistan)	18
Switzerland (Schweizer Hitparade)	10
Ukraine Airplay (TopHit)	196
UK Singles (Official Charts Company)	6
US Billboard Hot 100	47
US World Digital Songs (Billboard)	1
Worldwide (IFPI)	3

2013 year-end chart performance for "Gangnam Style"
Chart (2013)	Position
Australia (ARIA)	90
Austria (Ö3 Austria Top 40)	36
Belgium (Ultratop 50 Flanders)	41
Belgium (Ultratop 50 Wallonia)	15
Canada (Canadian Hot 100)	47
Denmark (Tracklisten)	37
Finland (Suomen virallinen lista)	18
Germany (Media Control AG)	31
Hungary (Dance Top 40)	58
Netherlands (Dutch Top 40)	121
Netherlands (Single Top 100)	98
South Korea (K-pop Hot 100)	16
Sweden (Sverigetopplistan)	48
Switzerland (Schweizer Hitparade)	20
UK Singles (Official Charts Company)	49
US Billboard Hot 100	55
US Dance/Electronic Songs (Billboard)	16
US Hot Rap Songs (Billboard)	11
US World Digital Songs (Billboard)	1

2014 year-end chart performance for "Gangnam Style"
Chart (2014)	Position
US Streaming Songs (Billboard)	14
US Dance/Electronic Streaming Songs (Billboard)	2
US Dance/Electronic Digital Songs (Billboard)	46
US Rap Streaming Songs (Billboard)	4
US World Digital Songs (Billboard)	2

2015 year-end chart performance for "Gangnam Style"
Chart (2015)	Position
US Streaming Songs (Billboard)	24
US Rap Streaming Songs (Billboard)	9
US World Digital Songs (Billboard)	3

=== Decade-end charts ===
2010s-end chart performance for "Gangnam Style"
Chart (2010–2019)	Position
Australia (ARIA)	17
Germany (Official German Charts)	49

== Certifications and sales ==
Certifications and sales
Region	Certification	Certified units/sales
Australia (ARIA)	10× Platinum	700,000^{^}
Austria (IFPI Austria)	2× Platinum	60,000^{*}
Belgium (BRMA)	2× Platinum	60,000^{*}
Brazil (Pro-Música Brasil)	10× Diamond	2,500,000^{‡}
Canada (Music Canada)	4× Platinum	40,000^{^} / 502,000
Denmark (IFPI Danmark)	Platinum	30,000^{^}
Finland (Musiikkituottajat)	Gold	9,025
France	—	348,000
Germany (BVMI)	5× Gold	750,000^{‡}
Italy (FIMI)	3× Platinum	90,000^{*}
Japan (RIAJ)	Gold	100,000^{^}
New Zealand (RMNZ)	5× Platinum	75,000^{*}
South Korea (Gaon)	—	4,041,000
Spain (Promusicae)	Platinum	40,000^{*}
Sweden (GLF)	4× Platinum	160,000^{‡}
Switzerland (IFPI Switzerland)	3× Platinum	90,000^{^}
United Kingdom (BPI)	3× Platinum	1,800,000^{‡}
United States (RIAA)	5× Platinum	5,000,000^{‡}
United States (RIAA) Video Single	5× Platinum	250,000^{^}
^{*} Sales figures based on certification alone.^{^} Shipments figures based on certification alone.^{‡} Sales+streaming figures based on certification alone.

== Release history ==
Release dates for "Gangnam Style"
Country	Date	Format	Label
South Korea	July 15, 2012	Digital download	YG Entertainment
Argentina	September 4, 2012	Digital download	Schoolboy; Universal Republic Records
Australia	September 4, 2012	Digital download	Schoolboy; Universal Republic Records
Austria	September 4, 2012	Digital download	Schoolboy; Universal Republic Records
Brazil	September 4, 2012	Digital download	Schoolboy; Universal Republic Records
Czech Republic	September 4, 2012	Digital download	Schoolboy; Universal Republic Records
Denmark	September 4, 2012	Digital download	Schoolboy; Universal Republic Records
United Kingdom	September 4, 2012	Digital download	Schoolboy; Universal Republic Records
United States	September 6, 2012	Digital download	Schoolboy; Universal Republic Records
Canada	September 6, 2012	Digital download	Schoolboy; Universal Republic Records
Mexico	September 6, 2012	Digital download	Schoolboy; Universal Republic Records
United States	September 11, 2012	Mainstream airplay	Schoolboy; Universal Republic Records
Germany	October 15, 2012	CD single (enhanced)	Schoolboy; Universal Republic Records
United States	November 19, 2012	Digital remix single	Universal Republic Records

== "Oppa Is Just My Style" ==
"Oppa Is Just My Style"

Single by Hyuna and Psy
- Released: August 14, 2012
- Label: YG; Universal Republic
- Songwriters: Yoo Gun Hyung; Psy
- Producer: Yang Hyun-seok

Hyuna singles chronology
"Trouble Maker" (2011)	"Oppa Is Just My Style" (2012)	"Ice Cream" (2012)

Music video
- "Oppa Is Just My Style" on YouTube

- Oppa Is Just My Style
- Hangul: 오빤 딱 내 스타일
- RR: Oppan ttak nae seutail
- MR: Oppan ttak nae sŭt'ail

"Gangnam Style" was officially re-released on August 14, 2012, as "Oppa Is Just My Style" (오빤 딱 내 스타일), featuring additional vocals provided by Korean singer and 4Minute member Hyuna. Mallika Rao of The Huffington Post wrote that the video was "apparently retrofitted here to work from a woman's point of view, but the main difference we're spotting is less invisible horse riding and more sultry side-eyeing." As of September 2026, the accompanying music video had received more than 854 million views, 3.1 million likes, and 598,000 dislikes on YouTube.

== See also ==
- Korean Wave
- K-pop
- Gangnam Style in popular culture
- List of best-selling singles
- List of best-selling singles in Australia
- List of best-selling singles in Brazil
- List of best-selling singles in South Korea
- List of best-selling singles in the United States
- List of million-selling singles in the United Kingdom
- List of top hit singles (Youtube 100)
- World Digital Song Sales
