= Gangnam Style in popular culture =

Pop culture of a K-Pop song

"Gangnam Style" is a single released by South Korean singer Psy on July 15, 2012. It achieved widespread international recognition and became the most viewed YouTube video, becoming the first video to gain a billion views on December 21, 2012. "Gangnam Style"'s unprecedented worldwide popularity was acknowledged by YouTube, who called it a "massive" hit at a global level "unlike anything we've ever seen before" while Billboard noted that "Gangnam Style" was nothing short of a pop culture phenomenon. As a result, it has influenced worldwide popular culture in many aspects.

== Television ==
- In a Saturday Night Live sketch, a Lids employee (Kenan Thompson) feels down in the dumps, so another employee (Seth MacFarlane) cheers him up by pushing a very button which brings out Psy (Bobby Moynihan), who dances "Gangnam Style", later used in a nut commercial. Towards the end of the sketch, the button press reveals the real Psy.
- During VH1's Big Morning Buzz Live show, the television host Carrie Keagan told the audience that everyone in her office is "completely obsessed" with the dance moves of "Gangnam Style", which she later performed with Jason Dundas.
- South Korean boy band Shinhwa also showed their interests in "Gangnam Style" (especially lead vocalist Shin Hye Sung) with the members dancing to the "horse-riding choreography" repeatedly on episode 24 of their own variety show SHINHWA Broadcast, which was aired by JTBC.
- American stand-up comedian and actress Chelsea Handler mentioned Psy and "Gangnam Style" on-air during her late night comedy talk show Chelsea Lately. Psy later appeared on the show on September 19, in a parody sketch called "Psy Office Style".
- The Tonight Show with Jay Leno has presented several jokes involving the dance. On August 31, Leno showed parody video footage of American presidential candidate Mitt Romney, who made his entrance at the Republican National Convention "Gangnam Style". The October 8 "Headlines" segment started with the fake headline "Joe Biden will debate Paul Ryan 'Gangnam Style'." On October 25, the day after Barack Obama's appearance, Leno shows parody footage of a KTLA news story about Obama on ABC's Dancing with the Stars dancing to the song with another contestant.
- Big Brother Australia created a commercial with the housemates dancing to "Gangnam Style" to promote the 2012 series. It was danced again on the series finalé on November 7, 2012 by the ex-housemates with a taped recording of Psy appearing to announce the start of the performance.
- Indian actors Amitabh Bachchan and Shah Rukh Khan danced "Gangnam Style" during the Indian television game show Kaun Banega Crorepati.
- In the Brazilian comedy show A Praça é Nossa aired by Sistema Brasileiro de Televisão, the actress Marlei Cevada teaches the comedian Carlos Alberto de Nóbrega how to dance "Gangnam Style".
- The Pakistani telecommunication company Zong created a mobile phone network advertisement in which actors were seen performing Gangnam dance moves. The advertisement also loosely imitated some scenes from the original "Gangnam Style" music video.
- The Mexican television series Sabadazo, aired by Televisa, uses "Gangnam Style" as the series' theme song. The show also features a parody of the dance itself, named Sabadazo Style, which is danced differently than the actual "Gangnam Style" dance.
- Animated series South Park episode "A Nightmare on FaceTime" featured a Halloween party in which a large portion of the attendees dressed as Psy and danced to "Gangnam Style". Stan attends the party in disguise as "Gangnamstein", wearing a Frankenstein costume sporting a hairstyle similar to that of Psy and sunglasses.
- Contestants Kirstie Alley, Emmitt Smith, Kelly Monaco, and Gilles Marini, along with professional partners Maksim Chmerkovskiy, Cheryl Burke, Val Chmerkovskiy, and Peta Murgatroyd, danced to the song in the fifth week of competition on ABC's Dancing with the Stars in the fifteenth season.
- At the 2012 Country Music Association Awards, hosts Carrie Underwood and Brad Paisley danced to "Gangnam Style" during the opening speech.
- In the German television show Wetten, dass..? broadcast by ZDF, the television host Markus Lanz challenged the city of Bremen to find 100 residents willing to dance "Gangnam Style" on stage, which the city eventually completed just before the end of the programme.
- In the British television show Strictly Come Dancing, the contestants with their partners as well as the judges and presenters danced to "Gangnam Style" on the Halloween Show.
- In the "Thanksgiving" episode of the fourth season of Glee, the cast performs "Gangnam Style".
- The retired Brazilian footballer Ronaldo danced "Gangnam Style" during the Brazilian TV show Medida Certa Ronaldo Fenomeno as part of his weight loss programme, prompting sports journalist Michael Cummings of Bleacher Report to write that "Gangnam Style" is already "out of style a few weeks ago", but Ronaldo is now jumping onto the "bandwagon" like everyone else.
- Disney has parodied "Gangnam Style" in several of its cartoons. In the Phineas and Ferb episode "Happy New Year", Phineas, Ferb, Isabella, and the Fireside Girls do the "Gangnam Style" dance. Phineas is dressed in a blue suit as Psy; Ferb is dressed in a yellow suit as Yoo Jae-suk as they dance in a parking garage. Disney has also featured "Gangnam Style" in some of their promotional material in South Korea. On the videocast Doof's Daily Dirt, Dr. Heinz Doofenshmirtz comments on the video, and calls it Open Quantum Style. In The 7D episode "The Jollywood Jam", The 7D briefly dress up in blue suits and perform "Gangnam Style"; the queen and her assistant also do the dance.
- In Randy Cunningham: 9th Grade Ninja episode Whoopee 2: The Wrath of Whoopee 2, Randy briefly doing the dance "Gangnam Style dance in his NinjaNomicon.
- In Total Nonstop Action Wrestling shows and events, Christopher Daniels and Kazarian, as tag team Bad Influence, dance "Gangnam Style" as one of their in-ring taunts.
- Zara Phillips, the granddaughter of Queen Elizabeth II, performed "Gangnam Style" in a video with Team GB as part of the BBC's charity telethon programme Children in Need.
- In a sketch from an episode of the 2015 revival of CBBC series Horrible Histories, Kevin Eldon performs a song titled "Norman Style" as William the Conqueror.
- In the November 9, 2012 episode of Italian program Tale e quale show, comedian Gabriele Cirilli impersonated Psy and performed "Gangnam Style".
- On November 12, 2016, former Labour politician Ed Balls famously danced a salsa to the song with his professional partner Katya Jones during the eighth week of the fourteenth series of Strictly Come Dancing. Judge Len Goodman said of Balls' performance: "I don't think there's any words in the dictionary to describe that."

== Film ==
- The song was used in the 2013 comedy, This Is the End.
- The song was used in the 2013 documentary, Linsanity.
- This song appears during the credits of the 2014 film The Nut Job, with animals and humans from the movie dancing to it. An animated version of Psy also appears.
- In the movie Zyuden Sentai Kyoryuger: Gaburincho of Music, one of the villains dances "Gangnam Style" during a musical scene.
- In the 2020 animated film Trolls World Tour, Poppy, Branch and Biggie perform this song while trying to cheer up the country trolls with a pop medley.

== Flash mobs and folk culture ==
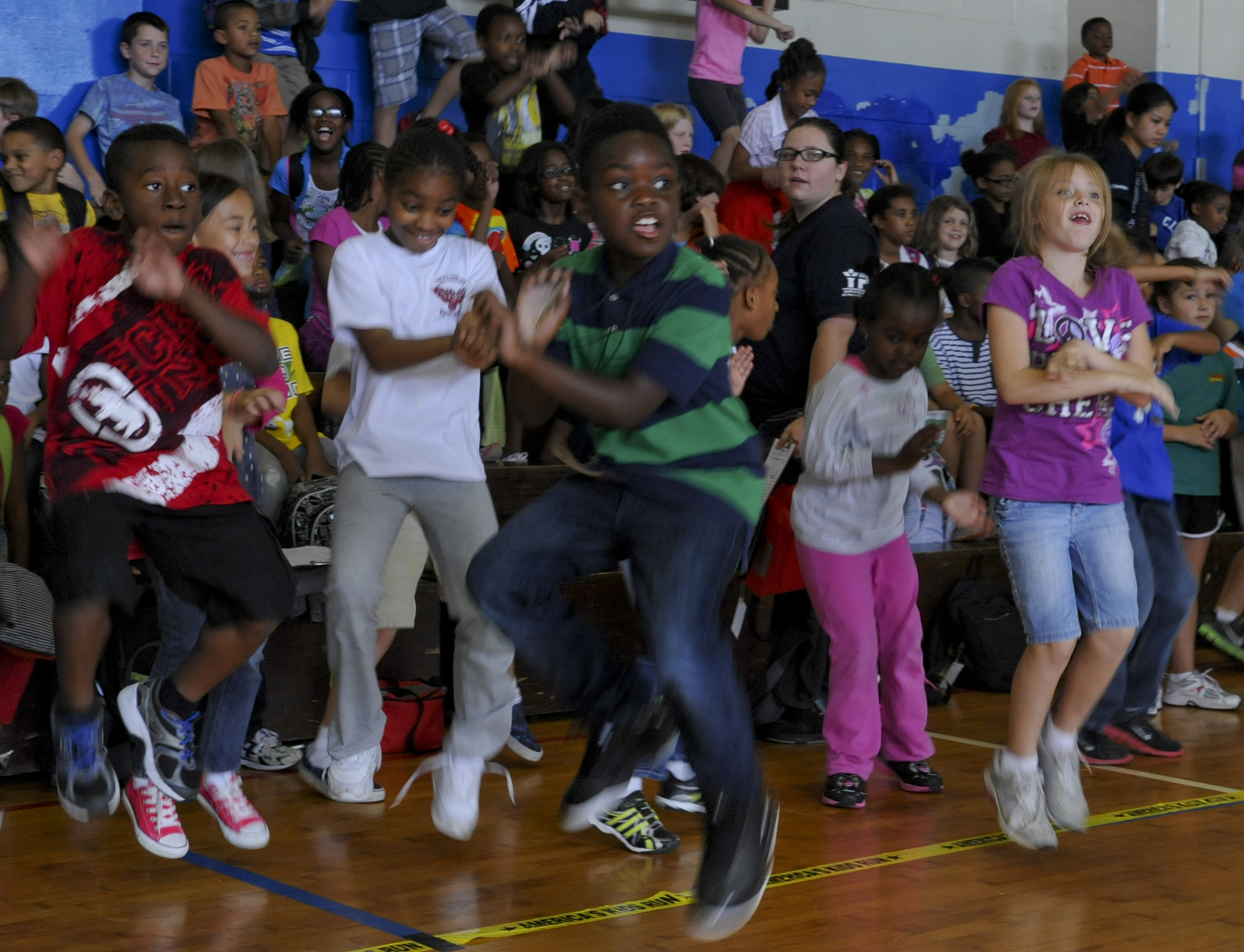
Children performing "Gangnam Style"

The earliest "Gangnam Style" flash mobs were held in Pasadena, California, and Sydney, Australia. On September 12, Times Square in Manhattan was filled with a flash mob dancing to the music of "Gangnam Style" during ABC's Good Morning America. Five days later, Psy appeared in a flash mob organized by the American entertainment TV show Extra in Los Angeles. The dress code was either "something comfortable" or "Psy-inspired clothing." A "Gangnam Style" flash mob in front of the Obelisco de Buenos Aires national monument in Argentina was shown on the national news programme Antes del Mediodía. In the Indian film Rangrezz, the song is an official parody of "Gangnam Style" featuring Jakky Bhagnani as Psy. All the scenes are from "Gangnam Style" video converted into Mumbai. In Thailand, officials from the Dan Sai municipality in Loei Province shot a video of people wearing masks and performing "Gangnam Style" during the Phi Ta Khon "ghost" festival. According to the Thai newspaper The Nation, villagers and spiritual leaders from Loei province have felt "uneasy" and also "greatly offended" about this "Gangnam Style" performance which tarnishes the image of a 400-year-old tradition.

== Sports ==
"Gangnam Style" has also made its way into various sporting events:

- On September 1, "Gangnam Style" was featured in the Presidents Race held during the Washington Nationals' home game at Nationals Park.
- On September 16, Starcraft II player Stephano celebrated his win by dancing "Gangnam Style" at the Starcraft II World Championship Series European Finals at the Ericsson Globe. Other finalists and e-commentators participated with the audience.
- On September 16, Canadian tennis player Filip Peliwo danced to "Gangnam Style" during the Davis Cup World Group playoffs at Uniprix Stadium in Montreal.
- The Ohio University Marching 110 performed the song during its halftime show on September 22. The video generated 5.1 million hits by Thursday before it had to be taken down from a security breach.
- Former UFC Light Heavyweight Champion Quinton Jackson on September 26, as well as the professional boxer Manny Pacquiao, who danced "Gangnam Style" while training for his scheduled December 8 fight against Juan Manuel Marquez.
- Members of WFTDA roller derby teams London Brawling and the Charm City All-Stars spontaneously danced "Gangnam Style" during the halftime of the championship bout at the WFTDA East Region Playoffs on September 30, 2012.
- On October 7, Novak Djokovic celebrated his victory at the third China Open title by dancing to "Gangnam Style". He promised his fans that he will do the dance after his win against the French tennis player Jo-Wilfried Tsonga.
- On October 22, Indiana Pacers center Roy Hibbert led a group of fans in a "Gangnam Style" flash mob at Circle Center Mall in Indianapolis.
- The American sprinter Justin Gatlin danced "Gangnam Style" during the Xi'an City Wall International Marathon Competition.
- During the Fast5 Netball World Series, the New Zealand national netball team launched into a rehearsed dance routine of "Gangnam Style" in their pre-game warm-up against England.
- On April 20, 2013, Texas Rangers fan the "Greene's Hill Kid" danced "Gangnam Style" after snagging A. J. Pierzynski's home run over Franklin Gutierrez of the Seattle Mariners.
- The song was played at the opening ceremony of the 2018 Winter Olympics in Pyeongchang, South Korea.

=== Association football ===
- On August 18, the Brazilian player Wesley from Gangwon FC scored a goal against Busan I'Park during Round 28 of the 2012 K-League and celebrated by dancing "Gangnam Style".
- On September 16, the Uruguayan footballer Edinson Cavani scored a goal during Napoli's 3–1 win over Parma in the Italian Serie A and celebrated by dancing "Gangnam Style" dance.
- On September 25, Selangor FA player Safiq Rahim danced "Gangnam Style" to celebrate his side's first goal during their 3–1 win over Johor FC in the 2012 Malaysia Cup.
- On October 3, Vancouver Whitecaps player Camilo Sanvezzo celebrated scoring the third goal in a 4–0 thrashing of Chivas USA by dancing "Gangnam Style". On October 7, Kei Kamara and C.J. Sapong of Sporting Kansas City danced "Gangnam Style" to celebrate Sapong's goal in their 1–1 draw with Columbus Crew.
- On October 16, the Bolivian footballer Carlos Saucedo danced the "Gangnam Style" after he scored three goals during the match between Bolivia vs. Uruguay. Bolivia won 4–1. This match was also, the debut of Saucedo in the Bolivia national football team.
- Neymar, a 20-year-old footballer who plays in the Brasileirão Série A, was reported to have danced "Gangnam Style" in the dressing room of Santos FC.
- The Hungarian footballer Ádám Szalai, who plays for 1. FSV Mainz 05, danced "Gangnam Style" after scoring a goal against TSG 1899 Hoffenheim in the Fußball-Bundesliga of Germany.
- On October 31, the German footballer Mathias Fetsch from Kickers Offenbach scored a goal against 1. FC Union Berlin during the 2012–13 DFB-Pokal competition and celebrated his goal by dancing "Gangnam Style".
- The German footballer André Schürrle from Bayer Leverkusen celebrated his club's second goal against SK Rapid Wien by dancing "Gangnam Style" during the pre-knockout stage of the 2012–13 UEFA Europa League.
- The Scottish footballers David Wotherspoon and Leigh Griffiths from Hibernian F.C. danced "Gangnam Style" at Fir Park Stadium after Wotherspoon scored the opening goal against Motherwell F.C. in the Scottish Premier League.
- The Slovak footballer Filip Hološko and the Turkish footballer Oğuzhan Özyakup from Beşiktaş J.K. danced "Gangnam Style" after their team scored a third goal against Mersin İdmanyurdu SK in the Turkish Süper Lig competition.
- The Iranian footballers Javad Kazemian and Mehdi Seyed Salehi from Tractor Sazi F.C. danced "Gangnam Style" after their team scored second goal against Al Jazira Club in the 2013 AFC Champions League competition.

=== Cricket ===
- Jamaican cricketer Chris Gayle danced "Gangnam Style" twice during the West Indies' match against Ireland and then repeated the act again when he took a wicket during the 2012 ICC World Twenty20 match against England. He also told his fans that he will keep celebrating "Gangnam Style" as the competition progresses. He and teammate Andre Russell had held a late-night "Gangnam Style" party, which resulted in three British female guests being briefly arrested by guards from Sri Lanka's. After the West Indies won the World Cup, the whole team, including non playing members, celebrated with a mid-pitch "Gangnam Style" dance. Gayle continued this for the night, including the medal ceremony and the team photo. Ministerial Security Division.
- On December 8, Bangladesh national cricket team celebrated their ODI series win against West Indies cricket team with "Gangnam Style" dance.

=== National Football League ===
- On August 17, Baltimore Ravens punt returner Asa Jackson danced "Gangnam Style" after scoring a touchdown against the Detroit Lions. The touchdown was nullified by a holding penalty.
- Uploaded on September 19, Shahid Khan, owner of the Jacksonville Jaguars, appeared in a "Gangnam Style" parody done by local radio station RadioNow 97.9 FM.
- On September 30, Cincinnati Bengals defensive tackle Domata Peko danced "Gangnam Style" after sacking Jacksonville Jaguars quarterback Blaine Gabbert.
- On October 21, New York Giants defensive end Jason Pierre-Paul celebrated with the "Gangnam Style" dance after sacking Washington Redskins quarterback Robert Griffin III. Mike Tolbert of the Carolina Panthers and Stevie Johnson of the Buffalo Bills also did the dance after scoring touchdowns in their Week 7 games.
- On October 28, Miami Dolphins defensive end Olivier Vernon danced "Gangnam Style" after scoring a touchdown off Jimmy Wilson's block of the New York Jets' punt. Vernon danced again after blocking a field goal attempt.
- On November 18, New Orleans Saints receiver Lance Moore danced "Gangnam Style" after scoring against the Oakland Raiders.
- On December 23, Indianapolis Colts interim head coach Bruce Arians danced "Gangnam Style" after his team clinched a playoff spot with a win over the Kansas City Chiefs.

== Technology ==
=== Robotics ===
- CHARLI-2, a five-foot-tall military robot built for the US Navy by the Robotics and Mechanisms Laboratory at the Virginia Polytechnic Institute and State University was one of the first of its kind programmed to dance "Gangnam Style"
- During the Industrial Summit Forum in Hangzhou, China, one particular robot was programmed to dance "Gangnam Style" and eventually won a dancing competition.
- The Human Interface Technology Laboratory at the University of Canterbury programmed its robots to dance "Gangnam Style" for a "better understanding of human-robot relationships".

=== Applications and video games ===
- In Ratchet & Clank: Full Frontal Assault, if the player throws a Groovatron during the fight with Zurgo, he will perform moves from "Gangnam Style".
- Just Dance 4, a dance game by Ubisoft, released "Gangnam Style" as downloadable content on November 20, 2012 for the Xbox 360 and Wii, November 27, 2012 on the PlayStation 3, and January 3, 2013 (PAL) and January 24, 2013 (NTSC) for the Wii U. The dance routine includes most of the choreography from the official video and the live performances, some rearranged or improvised.
- Just Dance 2014, another Ubisoft game, released this song as a recycled DLC, mostly for the PS4 and Xbox One, as those consoles did not get Just Dance 4. Released for December, the DLC is also available for Xbox 360, PS3, Wii, and Wii U.
- Just Dance 2015 released this song as DLC the day it released.
- This is in Just Dance Now and Just Dance Unlimited (Mainly for PC and Nintendo Switch as neither console got Just Dance 4)
- Dance Central 3, a dance game by Harmonix, released "Gangnam Style" as downloadable content on November 27, 2012 for the Xbox 360. The dance routine includes most of the choreography from the official video and the live performances, some rearranged or improvised.
- Pro Evolution Soccer 2013, a soccer sports game by Konami, included "Gangnam Style" in its selection of goal celebrations.
- In September 2012, app development company Workprint Innovations created Dance Video App, with a collection of "Gangnam Style" inspired dancers. Within this collection, users can choose between four Gangnam Style dance situations while capturing video with their iPhones.
- Swype, an input method for Android operating systems, included "Gangnam Style" in its list of recognized words and phrases.
- For a short time, characters in the Facebook game FarmVille 2 would dance "Gangnam Style" when the player leveled up.
- Psycho Bear Studios posted a Gangnam Style Story "endless runner" game on iTunes.
- In Starcraft II: Heart of the Swarm, each race features a unit that can perform the "Gangnam Style" dance.
- In League of Legends, the character Twisted Fate performs this dance as one of the taunts to his opponents.
- In Smite, the character Hercules has several of the dance moves as his dance emote.
- In Fortnite Battle Royale, two of the dance moves from the Gangnam Style music video are usable emotes. One of them, "Gangnam Style," uses the official licensed music, but "Ride The Pony" does not use the music.
- In the mobile app Sniper Shooter, the third mission in the first level, ironically titled "Gangnam Style", is a segment when you have to kill a man impersonating Psy, and the level features many references to this song, such as the quote on the victory screen being "Oppa Gangnam Style", and the bonus mission is to kill three Sexy Ladies, which is another reference to the song's lyrics.

== Parodies and reaction videos ==
In Geneva, Switzerland, about 300 people gathered at the International Monument to the Reformation for a parody of "Gangnam Style" organized by a local radio station. According to The Christian Post, "Gangnam Style" was parodied by Inri Cristo, a self-proclaimed reincarnation of Jesus Christ, to attract the public's attention. Another noteworthy parody is "Jerusalem Syndrome Gangnam Style", which is shot at the Old City of Jerusalem and includes important heritage sites such as Mahane Yehuda Market, Western Wall, Zion Square, and the Hebrew University of Jerusalem. It also includes a special cameo appearance by the Mayor of Jerusalem Nir Barkat. The Times of Israel described the parody as "a unique Jerusalem twist to the song". The Argentine TV series Graduados made another parody, danced by the Argentine-Korean actor Chang Kim Sung. Obama Gangnam Style! is a parody by Barack Obama impersonator Reggie Brown. The musical television series Glee covers the song in their season 4 episode "Thanksgiving" with Jenna Ushkowitz on lead vocals. The rapidly growing popularity and international recognition of "Gangnam Style" has spawned many user generated videos, some of them have received international media recognition, such as:

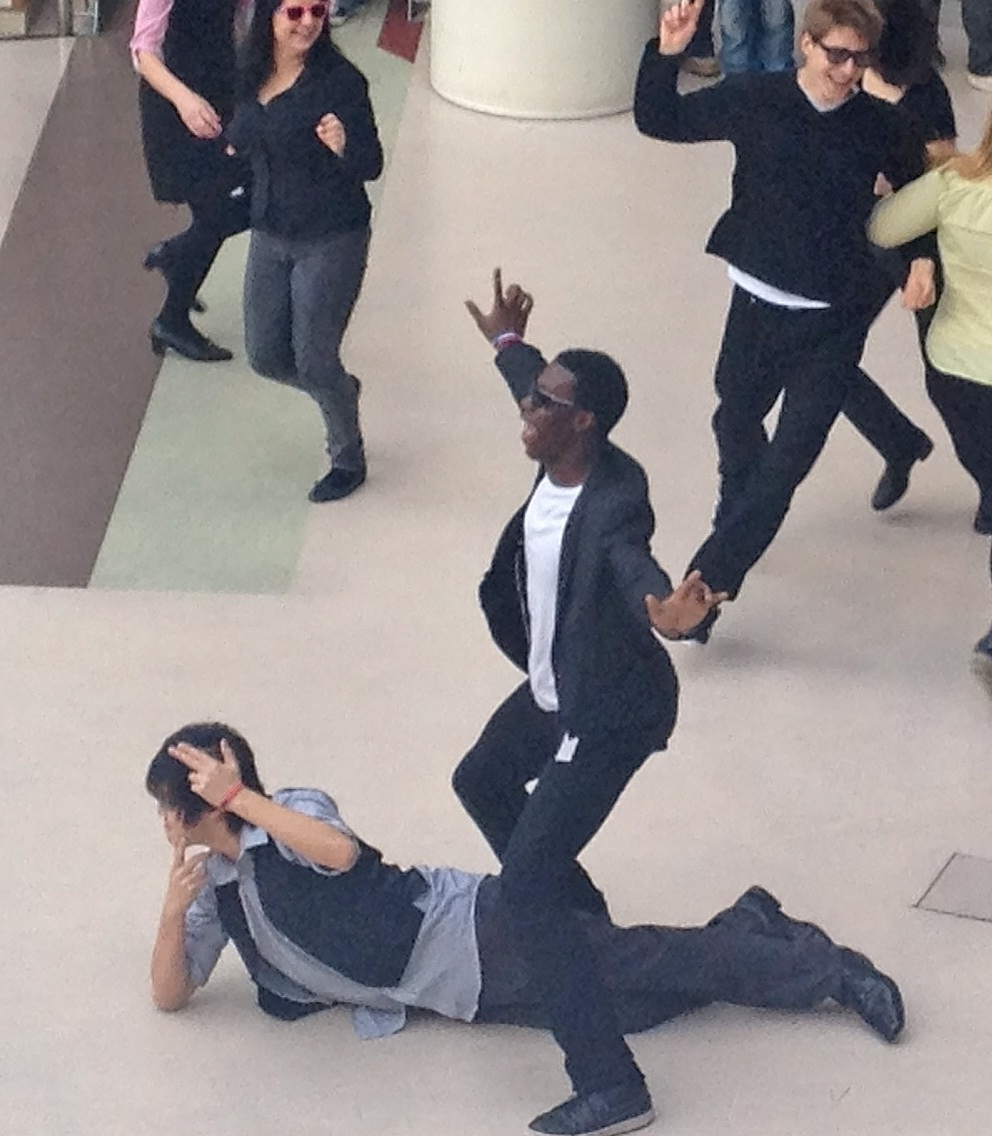
Students reenacting the elevator scene at the University of Bradford's atrium in West Yorkshire, England

- According to The Wall Street Journal, the Canadian couple Simon and Martina Stawski from the video blog Eatyourkimchi were among the first to review and do a parody of "Gangnam Style" on July 23, 2012, before T-Pain's tweet on July 29 "sent it into the stratosphere."
- Teens react to Gangnam Style, produced by the Fine Brothers. Jeff Yang of the Wall Street Journal wrote, "Ha ha, the Fine Bros. got around to exposing PSY on their panel of unsuspecting adolescents. Turns out, however, that most of them already listen to K-pop."
- Condom Style (from Bart Baker)
- Gangnam Style (Pentatonix Cover) Featuring the band singing the song in Korean lyrics.
- 'Gangnam Style' Also Calms Fussy Babies, Meredith Bennett-Smith of The Huffington Post wrote, ""Gangnam Style" may have broken a Guinness World Record for being the most "liked" video in online history, but it seems the tune and its "horsey-style" choreography also calms down fussy babies...The first video, which was posted on September 23, has already gone viral, amassing more than 400,000 views. It features Claire, a rather unhappy baby, who only calms down when the Korean pop song is played."
- Orange Nya Nya Style (from Annoying Orange) features the food parodying and dancing to Gangnam Style by PSY.
- NASA Johnson Style (from Johnson Space Center)
- Brony Style (Ima Pedophile) (from Rucka Rucka Ali) (featuring every character from the My Little Pony franchise and the characters from Family Guy, except Stewie) while the 1st video was uploaded by YouTuber HellBronyXendor.
- Hongdae Style, a parody by Trend Factory, was mentioned by The Wall Street Journal as one of five must-see Gangnam Style response videos.
- o "Lucky Fun Time Party").
- PSY Gangnam Style MV Reaction, by K-Pop bloggers Katie and Mindy Anderson. Evan Ramstad of The Wall Street Journal writes that "The Andersons’ reaction video is fun because of their spontaneity, laughter and creeping realization of what’s going on."
- Gangnam Style Meets Metal, by Eric Calderone, was mentioned in the Daily Mirror, a British national newspaper.

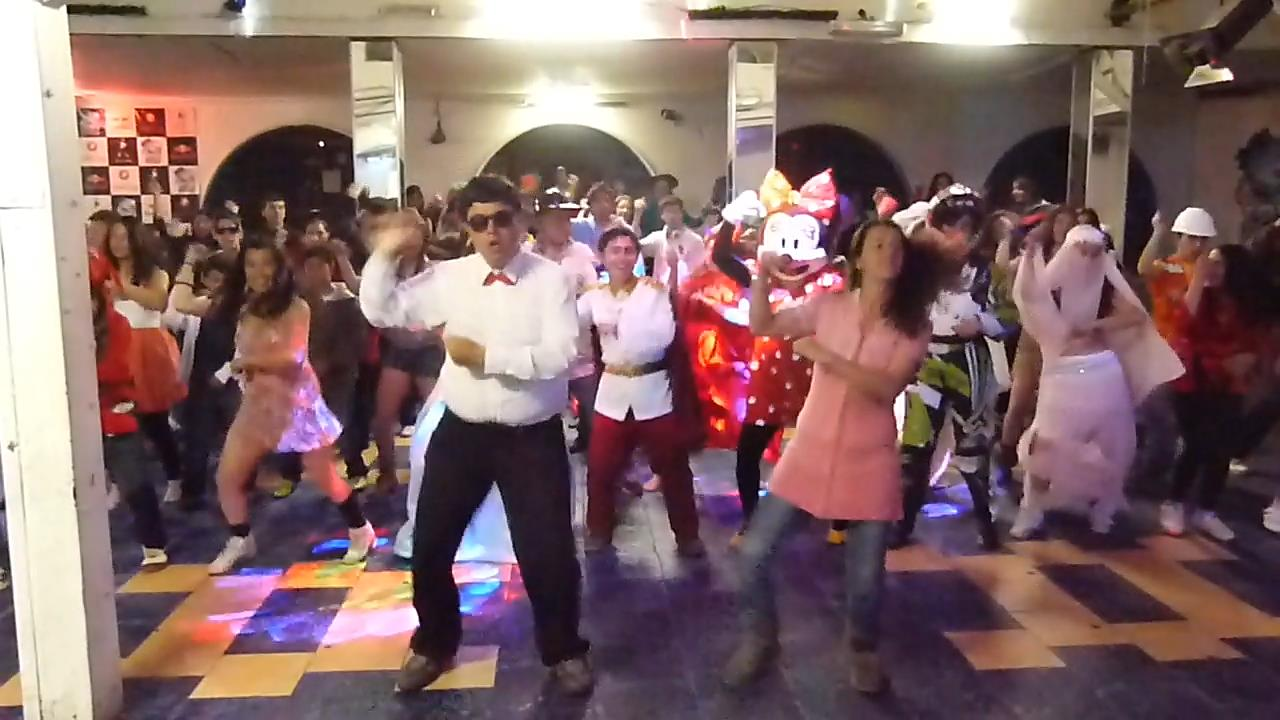
Students from the Colegio de la Preciosa Sangre de Pichilemu performing the final scene of Gangnam Style

- A Chilean parody made by students from the Colegio de la Preciosa Sangre de Pichilemu, featuring historic places of Pichilemu, O'Higgins Region, was published on YouTube under the title of Gangnam Style (강남스타일) - ALIANZA ROJA CPS PICHILEMU 2012.
- Bomba Style – Parody of the Iranian nuke, by Tal Talmon, was mentioned in The Jerusalem Post, an Israeli newspaper.
- In installment #607 of the webcomic Looking for Group, Richard the Warlock re-enacts scenes from the video.
- Gangnam Style สามัคคีนาวีอันดามัน produced by Royal Thai Navy, was featured in the Associated Press.
- Sukkos Style, published by Jewish-American band "The Maccabeats"
- CPDRC Inmates Gangnam Style (2012) performed by the Cebu Provincial Detention and Rehabilitation Center Dancing Inmates was featured in Agence France-Presse.
- Mitt Romney Style produced by CollegeHumor, was featured in The Huffington Post.
- INRI CRISTO – Versão Mística de Gangnam Style by Inri Cristo, a self-proclaimed reincarnation of Jesus Christ, was featured in The Christian Post.
- Minecraft Style is a parody of "Gangnam Style" released on October 26, 2012 by Jordan Maron, who goes by the username Captain Sparklez. It received over a million views in its first day of release. It is a shot-by-shot remake of the original "Gangnam Style" using Minecraft, a video game about building with blocks and objects.
- Like An Enderman is a parody of "Gangnam Style" released on November 13, 2012 by British YouTuber ThnxCya, while it got 492K likes on YouTube, with 0 dislikes, while there is no scenes like the K-pop song, but the Enderman is like the Elevator Cowboy, while it's created in Minecraft, while "Eh, sexy lady" is changed, "Hey, hey Stevie" and "Hey, I Am Creepy" is changed.
- The Filipino comedian duo Moymoy Palaboy developed a "Gangnam Style" parody featuring actors Michael V. (Pepito Manaloto), Paolo Contis, Brad Pete and the Dating Doon Gang. It was featured on the Philippine Entertainment Portal.
- Gundam Style by KatsuhonoProduction, is a parody of "Gangnam Style", where it plays on people's mistaken interpretation that Psy is talking about the iconic mecha of the Gundam franchise. The parody video utilizes the heads of various Mobile Suits seen in the Gundam franchise pasted onto many of the people seen in the video. The video parody was noted by Kotaku and G4TV.
- 'Rangrezz Gangnam Style was a parody that featured Jackky Bhagnani for the 2013 Bollywood film Rangrezz. It was shown towards the end of the film.
- A YouTube video named Irish Paddy Style was uploaded as a parody of "Gangnam Style". It replaces the original lyrics with words about popular Irish culture. It has been featured on Uploaded, a programme shown on 3e.

=== Asia ===
- Gangnam Afghanistyle was produced by servicemembers from an undisclosed unit and location in Afghanistan. According to the American military newspaper Stars and Stripes which operates from inside the Department of Defense, the troops seemed to be "enjoying" PSY's horse-riding dance while driving large forklifts and on an AH-64 Apache helicopter.
- Kurbani Style published by Radio Foorti in Bangladesh, focusing on eid-ul-adha, one of the most observed occasion in the country.

==== China ====
- 草泥马 style (literally, "Grass Mud Horse Style"), was uploaded onto YouTube and other Chinese websites by the political activist and dissident Ai Weiwei. In this parody, Ai Weiwei dances "Gangnam Style" with a pair of handcuffs as a symbol of his arrest by Chinese authorities in 2011. According to the Associated Press, government authorities had removed the video from almost all Chinese websites the next day. In an interview with Reuters, Ai Weiwei remarked, "After we had uploaded it, a few hours later...we found that a lot of people, tens of thousands, had already watched it. Now, in China, it has already been totally removed, deleted entirely, and you can't see it in China".
- 转账style (literally, "Transfer Style" ), is an anti-scam video produced by local police in Shanghai to raise public awareness of various tools and techniques used by telecom swindlers. According to the Shanghai Daily, "The whole story is reenacted in a humorous manner, similar to South Korean phenom Psy's global hit". The newspaper also wrote that this particular adaptation of "Gangnam Style" has garnered almost as much attention in China's blogosphere as the original "Gangnam Style" music video.
- 中國風, (literally, "China Style") provided by Youku.com, ft. a girl singing it, like Hyuna from Oppa Is Just My Style by Psy and Hyuna.
- 消防style (literally, "Firefighting Style" ), was produced by firefighters from Yulin, Guangxi. A spokesman from Yulin's firefighting department told China News Service that their version of "Gangnam Style" was produced to inform the public about their daily activities, responsibilities, and also to attract more people to join the firefighting service.
- 蚌埠列车员style (literally, "Bengbu Train Conductor Style") is a controversial version of "Gangnam Style" in which a man in train conductor's uniform is seen performing "Gangnam Style" while pointing his middle finger at the camera and spewing vulgarities. Although a significant portion of China's blogosphere described the train conductor as "talented" and "fun", others felt that he had tarnished the image of his occupation. According to the Shanghai Railway Bureau, the train conductor was subsequently suspended from service because of this video.
- 36中学版江南style (literally, No. 36 Middle High School Gangnam Style) was produced in Dalian, Liaoning, as part of a physical education programme in which almost 1100 students participated.
- Original Painting is a music video (MV) inspired by "Gangnam Style" and produced by Christopher Doyle and the Chinese singer Uta. The English language daily newspaper China Daily described it as a "Gangnam Style-like MV".
- Aircraft carrier style is a parody of "Gangnam Style" and refers to the crouching and pointing position taken by two technicians on the Chinese aircraft carrier Liaoning to give the green light to the fighter pilots. On November 25, 2012, the first Chinese flight landing on an aircraft carrier was successfully conducted on the Liaoning with the Shenyang J-15. An official photo showed two technicians on the carrier crouching and pointing to give the green light to the fighter pilots. Many photos of web users positioning themselves similarly can be found online, making aircraft carrier style an internet meme. The people in the pictures are usually in bedrooms and wearing a sticker with the Chinese characters 起飞 (meaning flight) on their backs, just like the Chinese Navy personnel. The pose was referenced at the end of the skit 《你摊上事儿了》 (meaning, roughly, you're in trouble) which was performed at the 2013 CCTV New Year's Gala.

=== Europe ===
- Gamar com style / Pedro Fernandes / 5 Para a Meia-Noite, produced by 5 Para A Meia-Noite, is a "Gangnam Style" parody which mocks the Prime Minister of Portugal Pedro Passos Coelho and was featured on Rádio e Televisão de Portugal.
- Badass Gangnam Style, by the German rock band Start A Revolution is a dark homage to the song in heavy metal style. It was Editor's Choice on German MTV and VIVA web sites and featured in the national German television channel ZDF and in many other countries. It was shot at three locations, one of them the oldest German BDSM club in Hamburg.
- Eastern Europe Style was uploaded by "TheVujanic" and has more than 2 million views. According to the British newspaper Daily Mirror, Eastern Europe Style is about a character called Bricka Bricka who draws upon familiar qualities such as getting lashed through heavy vodka consumption, a fondness for undertaking manual labour for low wages and a perceived propensity for misogyny.
- Tad Gram Style was created by teachers from Tadcaster Grammar School in North Yorkshire, England to raise money for the charity programme Children in Need. The video was featured in the BBC and The Daily Telegraph.
- Pocoyo Gangnam Style, published by Spanish YouTuber lacomunidaddigital, features the characters dancing from the children's comedy animated television series Pocoyo.
- Eton Style was produced by students from the British elite boarding school Eton College. It has more than 2 million views and caught the attention of international media outlets including the International Business Times and Time magazine. Sam Leith from the London Evening Standard wrote, "The thing that took many by surprise in Eton Style, the recent viral hit spoofing Gangnam Style, was the line: "We may be awkward, frustrated, lonely and insecure"" and labelled it as part of the "Eton Disorder" that has affected many of the college's famous alumni.
- Mas Style, on TV 3 Polònia, a comedy program about Catalan politics, was broadcast the Catalan public television. The parody features Bruno Ono who plays president Artur Mas.
- PSY - Gangnam Style - French version by "TheGreenGuys" was shot at many cultural sites in Paris, including the Eiffel Tower. It garnered almost a million hits and was featured in the French newspaper La Dépêche du Midi.
- Opplà Silvio Style was performed by the Italian television presenter Maurizio Crozza during the seventh episode of Crozza nel Paese delle Meraviglie, which aired on La7 on November 30, 2012, where he imitates the Italian Prime Minister Silvio Berlusconi in an hypothetical campaign song for Berlusconi's return to politics.
- Gangnam Policeman - Officers from the Falmouth Sector of Devon and Cornwall Police made a video dancing to "Gangnam Style" on January 7, 2013, to raise funds for Joshua Wilson from Bury, Greater Manchester who suffers with multiple disabilities after having a brain tumour.

=== Middle East ===
- Gamba Style (גמבה סטייל) was uploaded by the Israeli content and production company Srutonim in September 2012. The parody talks about a man who eats too much meat (played by Yuval Binder), and Moses (played by Moshe Ferster) tells him to stop his cravings and eat more bell peppers. As of march 2024, the parody has 66 million views.
- Saudi Gangnam Style ابو سروال وفنيلة, a video uploaded by six Saudi Arabian young men dressed in Keffiyeh, was shot in the city of Riyadh. It attracted more than three million views within a few days, but was criticized by Douglas Ernst from The Washington Times for its omission of women in the video. Ernst wrote, "Now we can add 'Gangnam Style' dancing to the list of things the ladies miss out on while the men have all the fun."
- Disalata: Hobba Egyptian Style/ هوبا ايجيبشان ستايل, a video shot at various places in Egypt features notable cultural sites such as the Great Pyramid of Giza and has almost a million views.
- Jewish style – Official parody to PSY – Gangnam Style (강남스타일), by Agent K, has more than 5 million views and was featured in The Jerusalem Post, an Israeli newspaper. The lyrics of the parody address topics related to the Jewish culture such as circumcision, bar mitzvah, Mazal Tov and Jewish festivals. The parody mainly features Agent K's member Roman Buchatsky, who is an Israeli Jew of Russian origin. It was recorded in the city of Tel Aviv.
- Jerusalem Syndrome Gangnam Style, was shot in the Old City of Jerusalem and includes heritage sites such as Mahane Yehuda Market, Western Wall, Zion Square, the Hebrew University of Jerusalem, as well as a special cameo appearance by the Mayor of Jerusalem Nir Barkat. The Times of Israel described the parody as "a unique Jerusalem twist to the song".
- Elkin Style was uploaded by Ze'ev Elkin, an Israeli politician from the Likud centre-right conservative party. It was deliberately released just after the end of Israel's Operation Pillar of Defense, and the video lists different bills which Ze'ev Elkin helped pass as well as his "unprecedented" success as coalition's leader.
- Mangal Style by "Hayrettin" is a parody of "Gangnam Style" widely shared around social networks in Turkey. It was also featured in CNN Türk, the Turkish version of CNN.

=== United States ===
- Gangnam Style – USNA Spirit Spot was made by midshipmen from the United States Naval Academy. A spokesman from the United States Naval Academy said that "The video is creative and humorous, but it also took a lot of planning and teamwork", and added that although it was filmed at the academy and several participants wore their uniforms, the production did not violate any rules or regulations. Commander William Marks, Public Information Officer at the Naval Academy, said that "Even in the demanding environment of the Naval Academy, it's good to see that the midshipmen have struck a chord with the American public".
- Psy Gangnam Style GW Lacrosse, by members of the women's lacrosse team from George Washington University, was considered a "solid effort" by Sarah Kogod of The Washington Post.
- Lifeguard Style, performed by a group of lifeguards from El Monte, California. They were released from official duties after they did a parody of "Gangnam Style" using the city's swimming pool, but were subsequently rehired.
- Captain Fear and The Tampa Bay Buccaneers Cheerleaders version of PSY's "Gangnam Style" was noted by Ben Chew of NBC Sports because it "even throws in a classic moment featuring Captain Fear pursuing a Tampa Bay cheerleader on the Raymond James pirate ship as she dances rather seductively." Tim McGarry of USA Today speculates whether it will rival the Miami Dolphins Cheerleaders's parody of "Call Me Maybe".
- The Houston Independent School District staff uploaded a "Gangnam Style" video which, according to Chris Gray from the Houston Press, was produced to encourage the community to vote early.
- The Oregon Duck – Gangnam Style Parody was featured in USA Today.
- LIPA Style was produced by John Mingione, a correspondent for the Long Island radio station WBLI. Jilian Mincer from Reuters reported that the parody was created as an answer to the Long Island Power Authority's slow response to restore electricity after residents were cut off without power as a result of the Hurricane Sandy disaster and subsequently sent thousands of complaints to Mingione's WBLI radio station.
- Obama Gangnam Style! is a parody by Barack Obama impersonator Reggie Brown.
- Jabari Parker Style was produced by four fans of the BYU Cougars men's basketball team. The parody was created in advance of the expected visit of Jabari Parker, one of the top basketball recruits of the class of 2013, to the Brigham Young University campus on November 24, 2012.
- Wonderful Pistachios Get Crackin' was a commercial during the television broadcast of Super Bowl XLVII in 2013. It features a green-suited Psy who dances "Gangnam Style" with pistachios in an advertisement for Paramount Farms' Wonderful Pistachios.
- "Weird Al" Yankovic included the verse "Polka Gangnam Style", as part of his parody medley "NOW That's What I Call Polka!" for his 2014 album Mandatory Fun.
- Stephen Quire does the Gangnam Style dance while watching the Gangnam Style video in the video Greatest freak out ever 27 on YouTube.

== Popularity among notable people ==
=== Politicians ===
Through his song Gangnam Style, PSY has become an
international sensation, with his satirical song’s video clip
- and its horse-riding-like dance moves – viewed more than
half a billion times since its release in July.

— The United Nations, October 24, 2012

Gangnam Style was mentioned during a U.S. State Department briefing on October 3, 2012, when a reporter asked spokeswoman Victoria Nuland if it may lead to a deepening of ties between South Korea and the United States.

UN Secretary-General Ban Ki-moon performing the "Gangnam Style" dance with Psy.

On October 3, 2012, "Gangnam Style" was mentioned during a U.S. State Department briefing when a reporter asked spokeswoman Victoria Nuland if she had heard about the song, to which Nuland replied: "No, but I bet you my daughter does. She loves Korean pop." She also told the international media that she planned to "dial it up" and watch the video.

A few weeks later Nuland described "Gangnam Style" as "fantastic" and added that both her daughter and her husband Robert Kagan "all love the Gangnam Style" and that she had mastered its dance moves by watching the video clip "for weeks and weeks."

On October 9, Boris Johnson, the Mayor of London, held a speech at the 2012 Conservative Party Conference, where he admitted that "Gangnam Style is very good". He talked about the vast variety of exports that originate from London, including television aerials which the Koreans use to watch "Gangnam Style". He also told the audience that he and the British Prime Minister David Cameron have danced "Gangnam Style".

On October 17, "Gangnam Style" was performed by George Christensen, a member of the Australian House of Representatives. During an interview with the French news agency AFP, UN Secretary-General Ban Ki-moon revealed that he has watched "Gangnam Style" several times. He hailed the song as a "force for world peace" and added that "there are no languages required in the musical world. That is the power of music, that is the power of the heart. Through this promotion of arts we can better understand the culture and civilisations of other people. In this era of instability and intolerance we need to promote better understanding through the power of music."

In 2012, Congressman John Lewis from the U.S. House of Representatives danced "Gangnam Style" to promote voting.

"Gangnam Style" has been used by presidential candidates during elections. Ju-min Park of Reuters mentioned that a few of South Korea's normally staid presidential candidates are imitating Psy's moves in an appeal to voters.

In Chile, the dance was also used by students during massive protests across the country and the Chinese dissident Ai Weiwei, who was detained by Chinese authorities in 2011 for his political activism, danced "Gangnam Style" with a pair of handcuffs as a symbol of his arrest and uploaded a video titled "Grass Mud Horse Style" onto YouTube and other Chinese websites. According to the Associated Press, government authorities had removed the video from most websites the next day.

The Colorado Democratic Party celebrated U.S. President Barack Obama's victory at the 2012 U.S. presidential election by dancing "Gangnam Style" during the Denver Democratic watch party.

During his speech in front of the Parliament of Malaysia, the politician Bung Mokhtar Radin drew comparisons between the youth of his country and "Gangnam Style". He remarked "They should be like PSY and Gangnam Style. He, his styles and his group is very popular. Millions of people are watching his video clip, not like our youths…destroying our image of our country and our people."

In Bali, Indonesia, The Committee for Environmental Advocacy staged a protest against the building of a suspended highway connecting Ngurah Rai International Airport with the city by dancing "Gangnam Style". In the Philippines, students commemorating the 40th anniversary of the declaration of Martial law in the country danced "Gangnam Style" at Chino Roces Bridge during a protest against the former President Ferdinand Marcos' use of the military during his 14-year dictatorial rule.

The following political leaders have mentioned "Gangnam Style" on social media platforms or through speeches:

Politician	Position	Quote
Jim Yong Kim	President of the World Bank	I love Gangnam Style, my three-year-old son dances around doing Gangnam Style all the time
Song Sang-Hyun	President of the International Criminal Court	Let me apologize in advance if I slightly overstep the conventional time limit allocated to speakers. I am afraid I could not stay within say, 10 minutes even if I were to speak in Gangnam Style
Barack Obama	President of the United States	I just saw that video for the first time. I think I can do that move. But I'm not sure that the inauguration ball is the appropriate time to break that out. Maybe do it privately for Michelle.
Tara Sonenshine	Under Secretary of State for Public Diplomacy and Public Affairs	Of course, we all know about Gangnam Style. Well, the man behind it – Psy – went to Boston University and the Berklee College of Music
Lee Hsien Loong	Prime Minister of Singapore	Enjoyed this Singaporean parody of "Gangnam Style", produced for Children's Day.
Najib Razak	Prime Minister of Malaysia	Been hearing about Gangnam Style all of last week, even in the news. What's your view that makes it so popular?

The following political leaders, Congressmen and Members of Parliament have performed the dance moves of "Gangnam Style" at various locations:

Politician	Position	Location of "Gangnam Style" performance
Ban Ki-moon	Secretary-General of the United Nations	United Nations Headquarters
David Cameron	Prime Minister of the United Kingdom	Chequers Court, Buckinghamshire
Boris Johnson	Mayor of London	Chequers Court, Buckinghamshire
Rob McKenna	State attorney general of Washington	International District, Seattle
John Lewis	Representative for Georgia's 5th congressional district	YouTube video
Mike Honda	Representative for California's 15th congressional district	YouTube video
George Christensen	Representative for the seat of Dawson (Australia)	Mackay, Queensland
Lim Swee Say	Minister in Prime Minister's Office (Singapore)	Promontory @ Marina Bay, Singapore

=== Celebrities ===
On August 16, 2012, Nelly Furtado performed the song at her concert in the Smart Araneta Coliseum in Manila, Philippines. One of the main factors that has led to "Gangnam Style" receiving worldwide media attention is its popularity among notable celebrities. According to The Wall Street Journal, T-Pain was among the first to have "sent [the video] to the stratosphere" when he tweeted about it on July 29. It was then picked up by Neetzan Zimmerman from the social blog Gawker, who asked "Did this underground Hip Hop artist from South Korea just release the Best Music Video of the Year?" on July 30.

The English actor Peter Serafinowicz called it "one of the best music videos ever made". while the German model Heidi Klum, who performed "Gangnam Style" at the 2012 MTV Europe Music Awards, revealed that her children have been obsessed with the song and that she has been holding "Gangnam dance parties" with them.<

Celebrity comments with more than 1,000 retweets
Name	Quote	Source	Retweets	Significance
Robbie Williams	P.S. Try watching this and not smiling I dare you.... (Not even a lip curl)	Personal blog	N/A	Earliest celebrity comment in late July. According to Emma Harrison from The Oxford Times, "Psy told the Oxford Union that it was Robbie Williams who uploaded it to his blog – which triggered a tweeting frenzy and the craze that took over the UK."
Justin Bieber	Heyyyy sexy laaady	Twitter account	151,850	Mentioned by Allkpop, Soompi and Mnet Media
T-Pain	Words cannot even describe how amazing this video is.	Twitter account	2446	This tweet by T-Pain had "sent [the video] to the stratosphere"
Josh Groban	It's a Gangnam Style world, we're just living in it. Amazing video.	Twitter account	1102	Mentioned by The Korea Herald, Seoul's official website, a blog post published by the Canadian Broadcasting Corporation, and Billboard
Katy Perry	Help, I'm in a Gangnam Style K-hole	Twitter account	12,822	Katy Perry's tweet further increased the song's popularity in the United States
Vanessa Hudgens	I am so amazingly obsessed. GANGNAM STYLE! Yeahhhha	Personal blog	N/A	
Britney Spears	I am LOVING this video – so fun! Thinking that I should possibly learn the choreography. Anybody wanna teach me?	Twitter account	4,573	Led to Psy's first appearance on The Ellen Degeneres Show
Tom Cruise	Think @psy_oppa (Psy) would make a good future co-star Gangnam Style?	Twitter account	1,940	Possible future collaboration
LMFAO	Check out #PartyRock .... Gangnam Style!	Twitter account	1,842	Mentioned by Hankook Ilbo
Scooter Braun	How did I not sign this guy!?	Twitter account	1,175	On September 4, 2012, it was confirmed that Psy was signed to Braun's Schoolboy Records. According to Jasmine Gardner from the London Evening Standard, this tweet also played a role in spreading the song's popularity among Western celebrities.
James Corden	I am so into Gangnam Style its insane!	Twitter account	1,717	
Darren Criss	Could not be more proud of the human race that PSY's Gangnam Style is one of the biggest things in the world right now.	Twitter account	2,337	
Hilary Duff	You guys... Gangnam style? I just..... I can't ....	Twitter account	2,924	
Ashley Benson	A lil late to the party but, better late than ever [sic] right?! I'm obsessed with this guy. I die. PSY -Gangnam Style	Personal blog	N/A	

== Others ==
In Thailand, two local gangs provoked each other by dancing "Gangnam Style", eventually leading to a gun fight with more than 50 rounds fired.

During a presentation of the beauty pageant Miss Earth 2012, some of the contestants including Miss Philippines, Miss Czech Republic, Miss Brazil and Miss Panama danced "Gangnam Style". The controversial Dutch artist Tinkebell danced "Gangnam Style" to promote a newly released nude calendar.

In 2018, BBC News wrote that K-pop such as Gangnam Style had caused an increase in the number of people choosing to learn Korean.
