= Gangnam for Freedom =

- Anish Kapoor with his mouth sealed and holding a pair of handcuffs in his video
- Release date: November 21, 2012
- Running time: 2 minutes 55 seconds

Gangnam for Freedom is a 2012 video clip produced by the British sculptor Anish Kapoor. It is a parody of the international K-pop hit single "Gangnam Style", and it was created to advocate the freedom of expression as well as to support the Chinese dissident Ai Weiwei, whose parody of "Gangnam Style" was blocked by Chinese authorities immediately after it was uploaded. The video features appearances by the staff of numerous contemporary art museums as well as human rights activists from Liberty, Index on Censorship, The Helen Bamber Foundation, and Amnesty International.

== Background ==
"草泥马 style" (literally, "Grass Mud Horse Style"), was uploaded onto YouTube and other Chinese websites by the political activist and dissident Ai Weiwei. In his parody, Ai Weiwei dances "Gangnam Style" with a pair of handcuffs as a symbol of his arrest by Chinese authorities in 2011. According to the Associated Press, government authorities had removed the video from almost all Chinese websites the next day. In an interview with Reuters, Ai Weiwei remarked, "After we had uploaded it, a few hours later...we found that a lot of people, tens of thousands, had already watched it. Now, in China, it has already been totally removed, deleted entirely, and you can't see it in China".

In order to show his solidarity with Ai Weiwei and to protest against censorship by the Chinese government, Anish Kapoor enlisted the aid of some prominent British artists, including Tom Phillips and Mark Wallinger to produce another parody of "Gangnam Style". It was also produced to support other censored intellectuals and artists including Russia’s jailed feminist punk collective Pussy Riot, the Bahraini human-rights activist Abdulhadi al-Khawaja, and also to mark the International Day to End Impunity on 23 November.

Our film aims to make a serious point about freedom of speech and freedom of expression. It is our hope that this gesture of support for Ai Weiwei and all prisoners of conscience will be wide-ranging and will help to emphasise how important these freedoms are to us all.

— Anish Kapoor

== Synopsis ==
The video clip begins by showing Anish Kapoor lying on the floor in a bright pink shirt and his hands being restrained by a pair of handcuffs. Then, a few shots from Ai Weiwei's parody of "Gangnam Style" are shown. Kapoor then performs the dance moves of "Gangnam Style".

At 0:29, a group of activists holds up a sign which reads, "Human Rights For China". An Amnesty International placard shown at 1:31 reads "End repression. Allow expression". Other participants dance around the room wearing black-and-white masks of Ai Weiwei and Gao Zhisheng, a Chinese human rights lawyer who went missing in 2009. In the second part of the video, footage shows staff from contemporary art museums in the United States and elsewhere performing the dance moves of "Gangnam Style" in solidarity with imprisoned human rights activists. In another scene, a line of masked participants are shown with their middle fingers raised to symbolize their defiance against state censorship.

Towards the end of the video, a woman approaches Kapoor and frees him by removing his sunglasses. Kapoor then removes the duct tape from his mouth, and the video ends with a list of people "still being persecuted, imprisoned, tortured, and forced into exile because of their expression".

== Reception ==
Kate Allen, the Director of Amnesty International UK, described the video as "a wonderful tribute to Ai Weiwei" and she also expressed hope that those who have watched the video would "reflect on the limits placed on freedom of expression in China".

Ai Weiwei himself interpreted the video as a "good inspiration for young people."

== Credits and personnel ==
The video was choreographed by Akram Khan, an English dancer of Bangladeshi descent. It features human rights activists from Amnesty International and was recorded in Kapoor’s studio in London. About 400 dancers and art patrons contributed to the production of the video, as well as staff from art museums such as:

- Museum of Modern Art
- Solomon R. Guggenheim Museum
- New Museum
- Philadelphia Museum of Art
- Museum of Contemporary Art San Diego
- Hirshhorn Museum and Sculpture Garden
- Brooklyn Museum
- Los Angeles County Museum of Art
- Serpentine Gallery
- Tate

Other prominent figures who participated in the recording of the video include:

- Tamara Rojo, Artistic Director of the English National Ballet
- Hanif Kureishi, an English playwright, filmmaker and novelist
- Mark Wallinger, an English artist best known for his installation artwork State Britain
- Deborah Bull, Creative Director of the Royal Opera House.
- Patrick Brill, a British contemporary artist better known by his pseudonym Bob and Roberta Smith.
- Tom Phillips, an English painter, printmaker and collagist.
- Jude Kelly, Artistic Director of the Southbank Centre.
