= Lee Ju-sun =

South Korean choreographer and dancer

- Hangul: 이주선
- RR: I Juseon
- MR: I Chusŏn

Lee Ju-sun is a South Korean choreographer and dancer. He is best known as the creator of the "horse-riding dance" from Psy's viral music video "Gangnam Style".

Lee began his career during the 1990s as a background dancer but the meager income forced him to leave the industry and he started his own small business. However he returned to dancing as it was his passion and performed with or choreographed for the likes of Im Chang-jung, g.o.d, Cha Tae-hyun, UN, Kim Jin-pyo, and Psy. He heads a dance team called Mania which mainly performs with g.o.d and Psy, both of whom he has performed with and choreographed for since the early 2000s.

Lee came to further prominence as the creator of the "horse-riding" dance in Psy's 2012 hit song "Gangnam Style". The success and popularity of the move won him the Style of the Year (Choreographer) Award at the 2nd Gaon Chart Music Awards. With the global spread of K-pop and the massive success of "Gangnam Style", Lee has been a vocal activist calling for choreographers to be allowed to claim and collect copyright fees to prevent them from being exploited. He and six other choreographers co-founded the Korea Choreography Association.

In 2015 Lee made his debut as a singer and released a single "Druwa", which featured Joohee of 8eight.
