= Eatyourkimchi =

YouTube channel

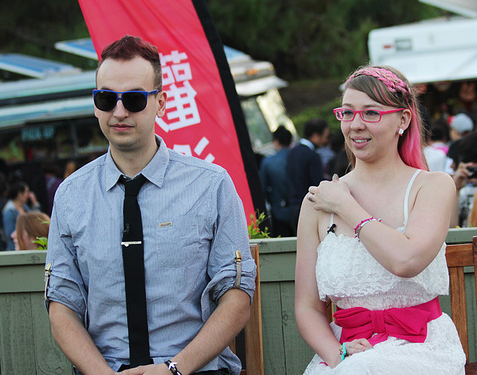
- Simon Stawski (left) and Martina Sazunic (right) at a fan meeting during KCON 2012

YouTube information
- Channel: Eatyourkimchi Studio
- Years active: 2008–present
- Genres: Vlog; travelogue
- Subscribers: 1.15 million
- Views: 497 million
- Last updated: Apr 23, 2026

Eatyourkimchi (Eat Your Kimchi, also titled Simon and Martina from 2016–2020) is a YouTube video blog channel created by Canadian expatriates Simon Stawski and Martina Sazunic in 2008. The channel featured videos about their lives in South Korea, including food, cultural differences, and popular media. In 2012, they registered Eatyourkimchi as a company in South Korea and opened their own studio in Seoul, which remained operational until 2015.

In 2016, Stawski and Sazunic moved to Tokyo, Japan and produced a video series on Japanese food and culture titled Eatyoursushi. Their channel was rebranded as Simon and Martina to reflect the change. In May 2018, the channel had 1.3 million subscribers.

In 2021, the two had renamed their YouTube channel back to Eatyourkimchi and announced they had divorced, with Sazunic eventually leaving the channel in 2022.

== Background ==
Simon Stawski and Martina Sazunic met in 2005 during a poetry class at the University of Toronto, and both earned a bachelor's degree in Education and Art. The two married on their university graduation day in 2007. After marrying, the two moved to Bucheon, South Korea, in 2008 to teach English abroad. At the time of their arrival, there had been threats of violence between North and South Korea. As a result, they uploaded their first video on YouTube as an attempt to show their parents that they were safe, which was a video of them eating sundubu-jjigae at Incheon International Airport. Originally, the video blogs were made for their friends and family, but it later expanded to documenting "fun and quirky things" about Korea, and they later titled their channel Eatyourkimchi. They were several of the first non-Korean bloggers whose content was centered on Korea, particularly on YouTube.

== History ==
Stawski and Sazunic meeting fans at KCON 2012

Eatyourkimchi experienced a rise in viewership in 2009. In 2011, after quitting their jobs as teachers, Stawski and Sazunic became full-time bloggers living off the ad revenue from their YouTube videos and website. The popularity of Eatyourkimchi led them to be invited on South Korean television programs such as Heart to Heart, Quilt Your Korean Map, Star King, and Running Man. On September 5, 2012, Stawski and Sazunic launched a fundraiser on Indiegogo for setting up a business and for a studio in Seoul to film. The fundraiser met its goal of $40,000 in less than seven hours and raised more than $100,000. By 2013, Stawski and Sazunic registered Eatyourkimchi as a business and relocated from Bucheon to Seoul. Video producers Soo Zee Kim and Leigh Cooper were hired as Eatyourkimchi's interns and later appeared in their videos. On August 9, 2014, in collaboration with the YouTube channel Talk to Me in Korean, Stawski and Sazunic opened You Are Here Cafe, a cafe situated in Hongdae for language exchange and Korean language classes.

Stawski and Sazunic met Adam Swarts, the CEO of Japanese media company Breaker, at a video industry event in the United States, who offered to sign them onto his company and bring them over to Japan. They accepted, having decided to expedite their travel plans due to the increasing severity of Sazunic's Ehlers–Danlos syndrome. In November 2015, Stawski and Sazunic closed down Eatyourkimchi's studio to move to Kichijōji in Tokyo, Japan the following year, and they also announced they were no longer associated with You Are Here Cafe. Their video series was renamed Eatyoursushi ("Eat Your Sushi"), and the channel itself was also renamed Simon and Martina during the rebranding. At the time of their initial announcement to move, Stawski and Sazunic intended on moving to other parts of the world besides Japan. In May 2018, the channel had 1.3 million subscribers.

In 2020, Stawski and Sazunic moved back to Canada, and on February 11, 2021, they announced on Instagram that they had divorced but will continue to post new content. The YouTube channel also reverted to the Eatyourkimchi name. On October 13, 2022, Sazunic announced that she would no longer be posting to Eatyourkimchi's YouTube channel to focus on her own YouTube channel, King Kogi.

== Video series ==
Eatyourkimchi highlights cuisine, lifestyle, and recommended locations from abroad. When Stawski and Sazunic were living in South Korea, their content also featured Korean popular media, such as K-pop and Korean dramas.

- Music Mondays: This segment features music reviews to the latest K-pop song releases and was originally uploaded on Mondays.
- TL;DR: Too Long; Didn't Read: This segment features fan questions about life and culture in South Korea answered by Stawski and Sazunic, originally uploaded on Wednesdays.
- WANK: Wonderful Adventure Now Korea: This segment highlights locations in South Korea, originally uploaded on Thursdays.
- WTF: Wonderful Treasure Find: This segment features an unusual item that Stawski and Sazunic buy and test, originally uploaded on Thursdays.
- K-Crunch Indie: Beginning in 2013, this segment promotes independent bands in South Korea and was originally uploaded on Sundays.
- Eatyoursushi: After moving to Japan in 2016, Stawski and Sazunic produced a video series documenting Japanese cuisine and culture.

== Reception ==
In 2011, Eatyourkimchi was the 18th most popular YouTube channel in South Korea. The Korea Herald included Eatyourkimchi in a list of 21 of "the nation's most useful websites." On the website Hiexpat.com, it was also voted the best expat blog in South Korea in 2011. Elysabeth Hahm from Yonhap News noted that Stawski and Sazunic allowed tourists to gain information from a local's perspective that was not present in guidebooks. On the other hand, David Oh and Chuyun Oh, through the periodical Communication, Culture & Critique, criticized Eatyourkimchi, describing Stawski and Sazunic's approach towards Korean culture as ethnocentric and orientalist.
