= Lee Jung-hyun discography =

- Studio albums: 9
- EPs: 2
- Remix albums: 1

The discography of South Korean singer and actress Lee Jung-hyun consists of nine studio albums, two extended plays, and one remix album.

== Albums ==
=== Studio albums ===
Title	Album details	Peak chart positions			Sales
Title	Album details	KOR RIAK	KOR Circle	JPN	Sales
Let's Go to My Star	Released: November 1, 1999 (KOR); Label: HS Media; Format: CD, cassette	6	—	—	KOR: 532,185
Lee Jung Hyun II	Released: June 9, 2000 (KOR); Label: Yedang Entertainment; Format: CD, cassette	1	—	—	KOR: 382,433
Magic to Go to My Star	Released: October 23, 2001 (KOR); Label: Pan Entertainment; Format: CD, cassette	6	—	—	KOR: 202,408
I ♡ Natural	Released: November 1, 2002 (KOR); Label: Pan Entertainment; Format: CD, cassette	2	—	—	KOR: 171,938
Passion	Released: June 21, 2004 (KOR); Label: Pan Entertainment; Format: CD, cassette	7	—	—	KOR: 27,880
This Is Hyony	Released: January 25, 2006 (JPN); Label: United Asia; Format: CD	—	—	217	
Fantastic Girl	Released: October 6, 2006 (KOR); Label: AVA Film & Entertainment; Format: CD	13	—	—	KOR: 11,239
Love Me	Released: March 11, 2008 (CHN); Label: Ocean Butterflies Music; Format: CD+DVD	—	—	—	
Lee Jung Hyun 007th	Released: May 11, 2010 (KOR); Label: AVA Film & Entertainment; Format: CD, digital download	—N/a	10	—	KOR: 2,382
"—" denotes releases that did not chart or were not released in that region.

=== Remix albums ===
Title	Album details	Peak chart positions	Sales
Title	Album details	KOR RIAK	Sales
Summer Party	Released: July 10, 2003 (KOR); Label: Pan Entertainment; Format: CD+VCD, cassette, digital download	4	KOR: 51,609

== Extended plays ==
Title	Album details	Peak chart positions		Sales
Title	Album details	KOR	JPN	Sales
WA-come on-	Released: March 21, 2005 (JPN); Label: United Asia; Format: CD, digital download	—	40	
Avaholic	Released: May 19, 2009 (KOR); Label: AVA Films & Entertainment; Format: CD, digital download	23	—	
"—" denotes releases that did not chart or were not released in that region.

== Singles ==
Title	Year	Peak chart positions		Album
Title	Year	KOR	JPN	Album
Korean
"Wa"	1999	1	—	Let's Go to My Star
"Change"	1999	1	—	Let's Go to My Star
"You"	2000	1	—	Lee Jung Hyun II
"Joolae"	2000	5	—	Lee Jung Hyun II
"Peace"	2000	12	—	Lee Jung Hyun II
"Going Crazy"	2001	5	—	Magic to Go to My Star
"Half"	2001	11	—	Magic to Go to My Star
"Ari Ari"	2002	2	—	I ♡ Natural
"Dara Dara"	2002	6	—	I ♡ Natural
"Summer Dance"	2003	6	—	Summer Party
"Follow Me"	2004	13	—	Passion
"I Love You Cheol-soo"	2006	7	—	Fantastic Girl
"Crazy"	2009	—	—	Avaholic
"Vouge Girl"	2009	—	—	Avaholic
"Suspicious Man"	2010	49	—	Lee Jung Hyun 007th
"V"	2013	36	—	Non-album single
Japanese
"Heaven / Come on"	2004	—	17	WA-come on-
"Passion / Heavy world"	2005	—	—	This is Hyony
Chinese
"Love Me"	2008	—	—	Love Me
"—" denotes releases that did not chart or were not released in that region.

== Guest appearances ==
List of non-single guest appearances, with other performing artists, showing year released and album name
Title	Year	Other artist(s)	Album
"Senorita"	2009	Jun Jin	Infinity Challenge Olympic Duet Song Festival

== Soundtrack appearances ==
Title	Year	Peak chart positions	Album
Title	Year	KOR	Album
"A Petal"	1996	—	A Petal OST
"Heaven"	2001	—	Beautiful Days OST
"How Can I Hold Back Tears"	2009	—	Iris OST
"—" denotes releases that did not chart or were not released in that region. Note: Gaon Chart was established in February 2010. Releases before this date have no chart data.

== Music videos ==
List of music videos, showing year released and director
Title	Year	Director(s)
Korean
"Wa"	1999	Ryu Gyung-jin
"Change"	1999	Hong Jong-ho
"You"	2000	Hong Jong-ho
"Peace"	2000	Hong Jong-ho
"Joolae"	2000	Cha Eun-taek
"Pick"	2000	Ra Ho-beom
"Crazy"	2001	Jo Jin-mo
"Half"	2001	Ko Young-jun
"Ari Ari"	2002	Unknown
"Dara Dara"	2002	Unknown
"Summer Dance"	2003	Ko Young-jun
"Follow Me"	2004	Unknown
"I Love You Cheol-soo"	2006	Lee Do-young
"Crazy"	2009	Brian Friedman and Cha’n Andre
"Suspicious Man"	2010	Sah
"V"	2013	Park Chan-wook and Park Chan-kyong
Chinese
"Love Me"	2008	Ko Young-jun
