= Psy discography =

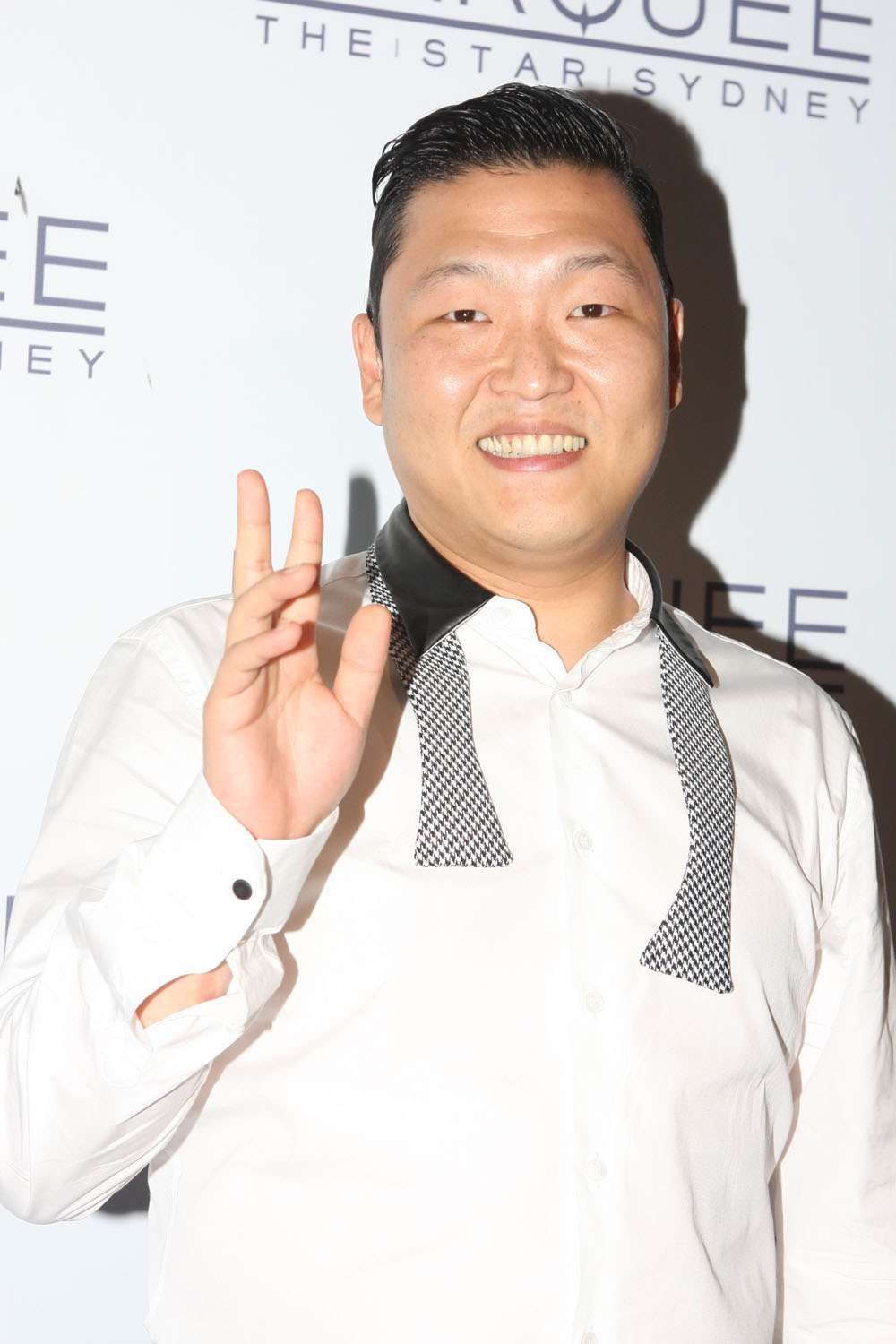
- Psy at The Star in Sydney, Australia
- Studio albums: 8
- Extended plays: 1
- Live albums: 1
- Singles: 26
- Music videos: 27
- Remix albums: 1

This is the discography of the South Korean singer Psy. He is well known for his humorous videos and stage performances, and for his hit single "Gangnam Style", a song about where he came from and which talks about the life of the people of Gangnam, which is a neighborhood in Seoul, South Korea. and his follow-up single "Gentleman".

In January 2001, Psy debuted with his full-length album Psy from the Psycho World!, for which he received a fine due to accusations that the album contained "inappropriate content". He released his controversial second album, Ssa 2, in 2002, which sparked complaints from concerned civil groups due to the potentially negative influence his album would have on children and teenagers. Since then, Psy has been thought of as a controversial artist, and Ssa 2 was banned in 2002 from being sold to those under the age of 19. Later in September the same year, Psy released his third album 3 Mai. The album's title song, "Champion", saw great success partly due to the hype from the World Cup games held in Seoul. Despite the significant amount of controversy surrounding his music, Psy was awarded with songwriting accolades at the annually held Seoul Music Awards, which marked his breakthrough in the music industry of South Korea.

In 2006, Psy released his 4th album Ssajib, which won honors at the 2006 SBS Music Awards and the Mnet Asian Music Awards. Psy released his 5th album PsyFive in 2010, but its lead single "Right Now" was banned by South Korea's Ministry of Gender Equality and Family for its "obscene" lyrics. Despite his lead single being banned, Psy received awards during the 2011 Melon Music Awards and Mnet Asian Music Awards. Prior to the release of "Gangnam Style", Psy had topped domestic music charts half a dozen times throughout his 12-year career, according to Billboard.

In July 2012, PSY released his 6th album Psy 6 (Six Rules), Part 1 and the song "Gangnam Style" appeared in broadcasting networks and newspapers outside Asia. On August 14, "Gangnam Style" ranked first on YouTube's 'Most Viewed Videos' monthly chart; it has received over 4 billion on YouTube (the first to reach this mark and currently is one of the most viewed videos in YouTube's history). His single, "Gentleman", was released on April 12, 2013 in 119 countries.

== Albums ==
=== Studio albums ===
| Title | Album details | Peak chart positions | | | | Sales |
| Title | Album details | KOR RIAK | KOR Gaon | JPN Hot | US World | Sales |
|---|---|---|---|---|---|---|
| Psy from the Psycho World! | Released: January 19, 2001; Label: Yedang, Cream; Formats: CD, cassette, download | 19 | — | — | — | KOR: 124,656 |
| Ssa2 | Released: January 17, 2002; Label: Yedang, Cream; Formats: CD, cassette, download | 14 | — | — | — | KOR: 73,833 |
| 3 Mai | Released: September 19, 2002; Label: Yedang, Pan; Formats: CD, cassette, download | 11 | — | — | — | KOR: 135,223 |
| Ssajib | Released: July 24, 2006; Label: Yamazone, Seoul Records; Formats: CD, cassette, download | 2 | — | — | — | KOR: 50,396 |
| PsyFive | Released: October 20, 2010; Label: YG Entertainment; Format: CD, download | —N/a | 6 | — | — | KOR: 22,950 |
| Chiljip Psy-da | Released: December 1, 2015; Label: YG Entertainment, School Boy, Republic; Formats: CD, download | —N/a | 6 | — | 6 | KOR: 6,816 |
| 4X2=8 | Released: May 10, 2017; Label: YG Entertainment, School Boy, Republic; Formats: CD, download | —N/a | 5 | — | 5 | KOR: 5,735; JPN: 202 |
| Psy 9th | Released: April 29, 2022; Label: P Nation, Dreamus; Formats: CD, download | —N/a | 36 | 65 | 3 | |
"—" denotes a recording that did not chart or was not released in that territory.

=== Remix album ===
| Title | Album details | Peak chart position | Sales |
| Title | Album details | KOR | Sales |
|---|---|---|---|
| Remake & Mix 18 Beon | Released: July 22, 2005; Label: EMI Korea; Formats: CD, download | 1 | KOR: 61,000 |

== Extended plays ==
| Title | EP details | Peak chart position | | | Sales |
| Title | EP details | KOR | JPN | US World | Sales |
|---|---|---|---|---|---|
| Psy 6 (Six Rules), Part 1 | Released: July 15, 2012; Label: YG Entertainment, School Boy, Republic; Formats: CD, download | 1 | 92 | 2 | KOR: 129,688; JPN: 10,534 |

== Singles ==
=== 2000s ===
List of singles released in the 2000s with year released and album name
| Title | Year | Album |
|---|---|---|
| "Bird" (새) | 2001 | PSY from the Psycho World! |
| "The End" (끝) | 2001 | PSY from the Psycho World! |
| "Hooray" (얼씨구) | 2002 | Ssa2 |
| "Report This Expression" (신고식) | 2002 | Ssa2 |
| "Champion" (챔피언) | 2002 | 3 Mai |
| "Paradise" (낙원) (featuring Lee Jae-hoon) | 2002 | 3 Mai |
| "Home Run" (홈런) | 2003 | Reversal of Fortune OST |
| "Someday" (언젠가는) | 2005 | Remake & Mix 18 Beon |
| "Delight" (환희) | 2005 | Remake & Mix 18 Beon |
| "Father" (아버지) | 2005 | Remake & Mix 18 Beon |
| "We Are the One" | 2006 | Ssajib |
| "Entertainer" (연예인) | 2006 | Ssajib |
| "Beautiful Goodbye 2" (아름다운 이별 2) (featuring Lee Jae-hoon) | 2006 | Ssajib |
| "Because It's Raining" (비오니까) | 2007 | Ssajib |

=== 2010s ===
List of singles released in the 2010s, with selected chart positions and certifications, showing year released and album name
| Title | Year | Peak chart positions | | | | | | | | | | Certifications | Album |
| Title | Year | KOR | AUS | CAN | FRA | GER | NZ | SWI | UK | US | US World | Certifications | Album |
|---|---|---|---|---|---|---|---|---|---|---|---|---|---|
| "Ring For Me Once Again" (featuring Kim Jang-hoon) | 2010 | — | — | — | — | — | — | — | — | — | — | —N/a | Non-album single |
| "In My Eyes" (내 눈에는) (featuring Lee Jae-hoon) | 2010 | 11 | — | — | — | — | — | — | — | — | — | —N/a | PSYfive |
| "Thank You" (featuring Seo In-Young) | 2010 | 16 | — | — | — | — | — | — | — | — | — | —N/a | PSYfive |
| "Right Now" | 2010 | 4 | — | — | — | — | — | — | — | — | 6 | —N/a | PSYfive |
| "It's Art" (예술이야) | 2011 | 51 | — | — | — | — | — | — | — | — | — | —N/a | PSYfive |
| "Shake It" (흔들어 주세요) (featuring Noh Hong-chul) | 2011 | 4 | — | — | — | — | — | — | — | — | — | —N/a | Non-album singles |
| "Father" (아버지) (@ Summer Stand Live Concert) | 2012 | 29 | — | — | — | — | — | — | — | — | — | —N/a | Non-album singles |
| "Korea" | 2012 | 75 | — | — | — | — | — | — | — | — | — | —N/a | Non-album singles |
| "Gangnam Style" (강남스타일) | 2012 | 1 | 1 | 1 | 1 | 1 | 1 | 1 | 1 | 2 | 1 | ARIA: 10× Platinum; BPI: 3× Platinum; BVMI: 5× Gold; IFPI SWI: 3× Platinum; MC: 4× Platinum; RMNZ: 4× Platinum; RIAA: 5× Platinum | PSY 6 (Six Rules), Part 1 |
| "Oppa Is Just My Style" (오빤 딱 내 스타일) (with Hyuna) | 2012 | — | — | — | — | — | — | — | — | — | — | —N/a | Non-album singles |
| "Gentleman" | 2013 | 1 | 15 | 9 | 11 | 12 | 10 | 3 | 10 | 5 | 1 | ARIA: Gold; BPI: Silver; BVMI: Gold; IFPI SWI: Gold | Non-album singles |
| "Hangover" (featuring Snoop Dogg) | 2014 | — | 81 | — | 171 | — | — | — | — | 26 | 1 | —N/a | Non-album singles |
| "Father" (featuring Lang Lang) | 2015 | — | — | — | — | — | — | — | — | — | — | —N/a | Non-album singles |
| "Daddy" (featuring CL of 2NE1) | 2015 | 1 | 103 | 36 | — | — | — | — | — | 97 | 1 | —N/a | Chiljip PSY-da |
| "Napal Baji" | 2015 | 2 | — | — | — | — | — | — | — | — | 12 | —N/a | Chiljip PSY-da |
| "New Face" | 2017 | 3 | — | — | — | — | — | — | — | — | 5 | —N/a | 4X2=8 |
| "I Luv It" | 2017 | 1 | — | — | — | — | — | — | — | — | 4 | —N/a | 4X2=8 |
"—" denotes a recording that did not chart or was not released in that territory.

=== 2020s ===
List of singles released in the 2020s, with selected chart positions and certifications, showing year released and album name
| Title | Year | Peak chart positions | | | | | | | | | | Certifications | Album |
| Title | Year | KOR | AUS | CAN | SGP | SWI | UK | US | US World | VIE | WW | Certifications | Album |
|---|---|---|---|---|---|---|---|---|---|---|---|---|---|
| "That That" (featuring Suga of BTS) | 2022 | 1 | 49 | 41 | 6 | 98 | 61 | 80 | 1 | 1 | 5 | KMCA: Platinum | Psy 9th |
| "Celeb" | 2022 | 23 | — | — | — | — | — | — | — | — | — | —N/a | Psy 9th |
| "Happier" (featuring Crush) | 2022 | 134 | — | — | — | — | — | — | — | — | — | —N/a | Psy 9th |
| "Everyday" | 2022 | 185 | — | — | — | — | — | — | — | — | — | —N/a | Psy 9th |
"—" denotes a recording that did not chart or was not released in that territory.

== Other charted songs ==
List of other charted songs, with selected chart positions and certifications, showing year released and album name
| Title | Year | Peak positions | | | Album |
| Title | Year | KOR | KOR Hot | US World | Album |
|---|---|---|---|---|---|
| "Blue Frog" (청개구리) (featuring G-Dragon) | 2012 | 9 | — | 20 | PSY 6 (Six Rules), Part 1 |
| "Passionate Goodbye" (뜨거운 안녕) (featuring Sung Si-kyung) | 2012 | 4 | 6 | 22 | PSY 6 (Six Rules), Part 1 |
| "Year of 77" (77학개론) (featuring LeeSsang and Kim Jin-pyo) | 2012 | 10 | — | — | PSY 6 (Six Rules), Part 1 |
| "What Would Have Been" (어땠을까) (featuring Lena Park) | 2012 | 9 | 7 | — | PSY 6 (Six Rules), Part 1 |
| "Never Say Goodbye" (featuring Yoon Do-hyun) | 2012 | 14 | — | — | PSY 6 (Six Rules), Part 1 |
| "Dream" (featuring XIA of JYJ) | 2015 | 5 | —N/a | — | Chiljip Psy-da |
| "I Remember You" (featuring Zion.T) | 2015 | 10 | —N/a | — | Chiljip Psy-da |
| "아저씨SWAG" (featuring Gaeko of Dynamic Duo) | 2015 | 17 | —N/a | — | Chiljip Psy-da |
| "댄스쟈키" | 2015 | 19 | —N/a | — | Chiljip Psy-da |
| "ROCKnROLLbaby" (featuring will.i.am) | 2015 | 20 | —N/a | — | Chiljip Psy-da |
| "좋은날이 올거야" (featuring Jeon In-kwon) | 2015 | 22 | —N/a | — | Chiljip Psy-da |
| "Sing (PSYmix)" with Ed Sheeran | 2015 | 28 | —N/a | — | Chiljip Psy-da |
| "Love" (featuring Taeyang) | 2017 | 12 | —N/a | — | 4X2=8 |
| "Last Scene" (featuring Lee Sung-kyung) | 2017 | 13 | —N/a | — | 4X2=8 |
| "Bomb" (featuring B.I and Bobby) | 2017 | 14 | —N/a | — | 4X2=8 |
| "Fact Assault" (featuring G-Dragon) | 2017 | 16 | —N/a | — | 4X2=8 |
| "Auto Reverse" (featuring Tablo) | 2017 | 30 | —N/a | — | 4X2=8 |
| "We Are Young" | 2017 | 33 | —N/a | — | 4X2=8 |
| "Refuge" | 2017 | 34 | —N/a | — | 4X2=8 |
| "Rock Will Never Die" | 2017 | 45 | —N/a | — | 4X2=8 |
| "9Intro" | 2022 | 145 | —N/a | — | Psy 9th |
| "You Move Me" (감동이야) (featuring Sung Si-kyung) | 2022 | 41 | —N/a | — | Psy 9th |
| "Sleepless" (밤이 깊었네) (featuring Heize) | 2022 | 98 | —N/a | — | Psy 9th |
| "Ganji" (featuring Jessi) | 2022 | 122 | —N/a | 15 | Psy 9th |
| "Now" (이제는) (featuring Hwasa) | 2022 | 103 | —N/a | — | Psy 9th |
| "Hello Monday" (나의 월요일) | 2022 | 146 | —N/a | — | Psy 9th |
| "ForEver" (featuring Tablo) | 2022 | 173 | —N/a | — | Psy 9th |
| "Dear Me" (내일의 나에게) | 2022 | 168 | —N/a | — | Psy 9th |
"—" denotes releases that did not chart or were not released in that region. Note: Billboard K-pop Hot 100 was introduced in August 2011 and discontinued in July 2014.

== Music videos ==
=== As lead artist ===
| Title | Other performer(s) | Album | Year | MV |
|---|---|---|---|---|
| "Bird" (새) | none | PSY from the Psycho World! | 2001 | |
| "The End" (끝) | none | PSY from the Psycho World! | 2001 | |
| "Hooray" (얼씨구) | none | Ssa2 | 2002 | |
| "Paradise" (낙원) | Lee Jae-hoon | 3 Mai | 2002 | |
| "Champion" (챔피언) | none | 3 Mai | 2002 | |
| "Delight" (환희) | none | Remake & Mix 18 Beon | 2005 | |
| "Father" (아버지) | none | Remake & Mix 18 Beon | 2005 | |
| "Urbanite" (도시인) | none | Remake & Mix 18 Beon | 2005 | |
| "We Are the One" | none | Ssajib | 2006 | |
| "Beautiful Goodbye 2" (아름다운 이별 2) | Lee Jae-hoon | Ssajib | 2006 | |
| "Entertainer" (연예인) | none | Ssajib | 2006 | |
| "Because It's Raining" (비오니까) | none | Ssajib | 2007 | |
| "Ring for Me Once Again" | Kim Jang-hoon | none | 2010 | |
| "Right Now" + Seo Woo Version | none | PSYfive | 2010 | Seo Woo Ver. |
| "It's Art" (예술이야) | none | PSYfive | 2011 | |
| "Korea" | none | none | 2012 | |
| "Gangnam Style" (강남스타일) | none | PSY 6 (Six Rules), Part 1 | 2012 | |
| "Oppa Is Just My Style" (오빤 딱 내 스타일) | Hyuna | none | 2012 | |
| "Gentleman" | none | none | 2013 | |
| "Hangover" | Snoop Dogg | none | 2014 | |
| "Father" (아버지) | Lang Lang | none | 2015 | |
| "Daddy" | CL of 2NE1 | Chiljib PSY-Da | 2015 | |
| "Napal Baji" | none | Chiljib PSY-Da | 2015 | |
| "I Luv It" | none | 4X2=8 | 2017 | |
| "New Face" | none | 4X2=8 | 2017 | |
| "That That" | Suga of BTS | Psy 9th | 2022 | |
| "Celeb" | none | Psy 9th | 2022 | |
