= Lee Jung-hyun (disambiguation) =

Lee Jung-hyun (born 1980) is a South Korean singer and actress.

Lee Jung-hyun may also refer to:

== People ==
- Lee Jung-hyun (basketball, born 1987), South Korean basketball player
- Lee Jung-hyun (basketball, born 1999), South Korean basketball player
- Lee Jung-hyun (politician) (born 1958), South Korean politician

== Albums ==
- Lee Jung Hyun 007th, seventh album of the singer
- Lee Jung Hyun II, second album of the singer
