= Psy from the Psycho World! =

PSY from the PSYcho World!

Studio album by Psy
- Released: January 19, 2001
- Recorded: 2000
- Genre: K-pop; hip-hop; dance-pop
- Length: 64:19
- Language: Korean, English
- Label: Cream Records
- Producer: Psy

Psy chronology
PSY from the PSYcho World! (2001)	Ssa2 (2002)

Singles from PSY from the PSYcho World!
- 1. "Bird" Released: January 19, 2001; 2. "The End" Released: January 19, 2001

PSY from the PSYcho World! is the debut album by South Korean singer Psy. The album was released on January 19, 2001. The album contains 19 songs and was later released worldwide through iTunes. Track 11 "I Love Sex" is a re-make of Lee Jung-hyun's song "I Love X", featured on her debut album Let's Go to My Star. Commercially, the album had sold nearly 124,000 copies by the end of 2001 and was the 75th best-selling album of the year in South Korea.

== Release and controversy ==
The full-length debut album is of the rap genre with songs such as "I Love Sex" that include candid lyrics. The title of the album refers to his stage name, a derivative of "psycho", and the album was made just after he attended Berklee College of Music and had returned to South Korea. On his choice of music, he listed rappers Eminem, 2Pac, Jay Z, and Dr. Dre as his musical influences. He said, "When I was a kid I was just a noisy boy, and I preferred to be in front of people when I was young all the time," and "At that time I was not a good singer; still I'm not a good singer. So when I see the rappers (I thought), 'Oh, talk can be music? Wow. That's for me."

In a 2001 interview with The Dong-a Ilbo, regarding the title of the album and his self description of himself as a "psycho and third-class citizen", he replied that "since the Koreans are two-faced and judgemental based on their academic credentials and lineage, they cannot be first class citizens who are honest, thus should be looked in the perspective of a psycho". He criticized the custom of lip-synching in the song "intro". The album was very controversial in South Korea because of the "content, dance moves and even his appearance", and could not be sold to minors due to the "vulgarity of the lyrics". His "blatantly aggressive" lyrics appealed to the younger generation of Korean music fans, but five months after the album was released, civic groups stopped its sales citing it as a negative influence for youth, and he was fined for the explicit language.

The songs, which he wrote and produced, have sensational titles such as "Sae (Bird)", "Upskail Phenomenon", "Shocking, Yanggajip Kyusu (a girl from a respectable family)" and the lyrics "mock people with fortunes and their distorted lives".

=== Adult content ===
About four months after its release, the album was labelled explicit in South Korea and unsuitable for children due to the album booklet containing pictures of condoms, male genitalia, nipples and female underwear.

== Title track and music video ==
The title track "Bird" was released with a music video that revealed him as a performer with his own style and fashion unlike the stereotypically good-looking male K-pop singers who danced so well. In the video, he is a "thinner, younger Psy" than his later years, and dedicates the song to 'Party Lady', one of the nightclub characters in the video he interacts with, "stealing kisses and cigarettes from". It featured a provocative chorus, setting the tone for his debut to the music scene at a time when social media and the internet were embracing new trends and Korean culture was welcoming "bizarre" things, to his advantage. His "outspoken and uninhibited lyrics" poked fun at current Korean society and cultural norms. During a 2012 interview with Marlow Stern of Newsweek, Psy described the music video as a "huge phenomenon" in South Korea due to its flashy outfits and outrageous dance moves, gaining him the nickname "The Bizarre Singer" from the press.

After "Gangnam Style" generated attention, music critics discussed his performance style in both that music video and this earlier one "Bird", debating whether to call it "comedy hip-hop", a genre that blends humor with rap, like icons Digital Underground and The Fat Boys, or more generally comic or pop oriented.

== Critical reception ==
The album received multiple reviews in 2012 after "Gangnam Style" was released. Of the debut single "Bird", Jeff Benjamin of Billboard said, "[it] established him as a true force of entertainment" and "nicely set up a successful career with the opening declaration, "PSY-cho world, this is PSY!" Houston Press's Corey Deiterman said of "Bird", "this ridiculously catchy bit of funky hip-hop sounds something like an updated version of the American new jack swing movement." Joseph Lapin of OC Weekly said the two tracks "I Love Sex" and "Bird" "echo early '90s rap and R&B beats reminiscent of a strange amalgamation of Busta Rhymes, Cypress Hill and Destiny's Child", and said, "similar to' 90s rappers, Psy had to pay fines for his lyrics, because they were considered inappropriate content....Inappropriateness and controversy are just more reasons to like Psy." Gil Kaufman of MTV News said of the album, "That CD opened the world on his oddball dancing antics and lyrics that turned him into a target of censorship in his country due to content that officials thought might negatively influence young listeners."

== Accolades ==
Music program awards
Song	Program	Date
"Bird"	MBC's Music Camp	April 7, 2001
"Bird"	MBC's Music Camp	April 14, 2001
"Bird"	MBC's Music Camp	April 21, 2001
"Bird"	MBC's Music Camp	April 28, 2001
"Bird"	KBS2's Music Bank	April 19, 2001
"Bird"	KBS2's Music Bank	April 26, 2001
"Bird"	KBS2's Music Bank	May 3, 2001
"Bird"	SBS's Inkigayo	May 6, 2001
"The End"	MBC's Music Camp	June 9, 2001
"The End"	MBC's Music Camp	June 16, 2001
"The End"	SBS's Inkigayo	June 24, 2001

== Track listing ==
All music is composed by Psy.

No.	Title	Writer(s)	Length
1.	"Intro"	Psy	1:50
2.	"Lady"	Psy	3:43
3.	"새 (Bird) (Note: The song samples Venus (Shocking Blue song).)"	Psy	3:13
4.	"끝 (The End)"	Psy	3:51
5.	"나에게 맡겨봐 (Leave it to Me)"	Psy	3:20
6.	"Life (Note: The song samples the string section in the intro of Rest in Peace (song).)" (featuring Ray Jay, Yota, Digital Masta, Small)	Psy, Ray Jay, Yota, Digital Masta, Small	4:29
7.	"동거동락 (Living and Enjoying Together) (Note: The song samples the main theme from the movie Enter The Dragon.)"	Psy	3:30
8.	"Freedom"	Psy, 아치	3:38
9.	"성냥팔이 소녀 (The Little Match Girl)"	Psy	3:19
10.	"No. 1"	Psy	3:22
11.	"I Love Sex (Note: The song is a rearrangement of the song "I Love X", from Lee Jung-hyun's 1999 album Let's Go to My Star.)" (featuring Cho PD)	Psy, Cho PD	3:51
12.	"쇼킹! 양가집 규수 (Shocking! Modest Lady)"	Psy	3:08
13.	"성공의 어머니 (The Mother of Success)"	Psy	3:41
14.	"놀아보자 (Let's Play )"	Psy	3:30
15.	"2세의 처 (2nd Generation Wife)" (featuring Ray Jay, Digital Masta, Small)	Psy, Ray Jay, Digital Masta, Small	3:47
16.	"불륜 (Adultery)"	Psy	3:28
17.	"계집녀 (Bitch)"	Psy	3:30
18.	"Upskail Phenomenon"	Psy, 아치	3:28
19.	"Modern Times"	Psy, 요리사	3:27
20.	"Outro"	Psy	2:14
Total length:			64:19

== Charts and sales ==
=== Monthly charts ===
Chart (April 2001)	Peak position
South Korean Albums (RIAK)	19

=== Year-end charts ===
Chart (2001)	Peak position
South Korean Albums (RIAK)	58

=== Sales ===
Region	Sales
South Korea (RIAK)	124,656
