= Suspicious Man =

Single by Lee Jung-hyun

from the album 007th
- Released: May 11, 2010
- Genre: Dance-pop
- Label: AVA Films & Entertainment, CJ E&M
- Songwriter: Ahn Young-min
- Producers: Ahn Young-min, Kim Tae-hyun

Lee Jung-hyun Korean singles chronology
"How Do I Hold Back Tears" (2009)	"Suspicious Man" (2010)	"V" (2013)

"Suspicious Man" (Hangul: 수상한 남자) is a song by South Korean singer and actress Lee Jung-hyun. It was released on May 11, along with her 7th Korean album, 007th.

== Charts ==
Chart	Peak position
Gaon Digital Chart	49
Gaon Streaming Chart	60
Gaon Download Chart	33
Gaon Mobile Chart	54
