= List of awards and nominations received by Psy =

Psy awards and nominations
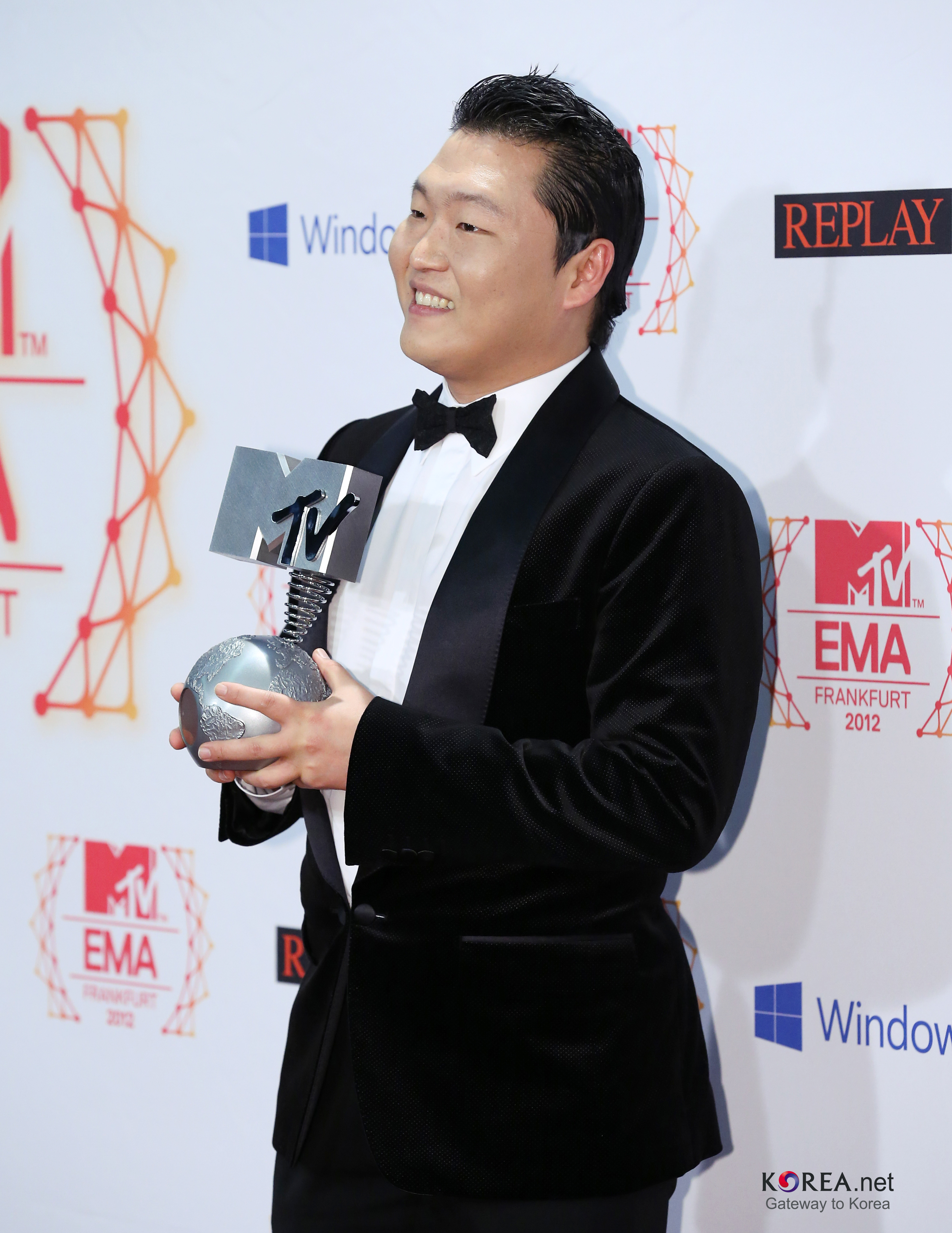
- Psy at the 2012 MTV Europe Music Awards
Awards and nominations
Award	Wins	Nominations
4 Music Video Honours	0	1
American Music Awards	1	1
Asian Pop Music Awards	0	1
Billboard Music Awards	1	6
Capricho Awards	1	1
CICI Korea Awards	1	1
Gaon Chart Music Awards	4	6
Golden Disc Awards	4	4
Genie Music Awards	0	5
Hall of Game Awards	1	1
Korean Music Awards	2	2
Melon Music Awards	6	14
Mnet Asian Music Awards	10	25
MTV Europe Music Awards	1	1
Nickelodeon Kids Choice Awards	0	1
Nickelodeon Korea	1	1
NME Awards	0	2
NRJ Awards	3	4
People's Choice Awards	0	1
SBS MTV Best of the Best	0	2
Seoul Music Awards	3	3
Style Icon Awards	0	1
VEVO Certified Award	4	4
World Music Awards	1	1

Totals (Note: Certain award groups do not simply award one winner. They acknowledge several different recipients, have runners-up, and have third place. Since this is a specific recognition and is different from losing an award, runner-up mentions are considered wins in this award tally. For simplification and to avoid errors, each award in this list has been presumed to have had a prior nomination.)
- Wins: 45
- Nominations: 84

These are the list of awards received by Psy, a South Korean entertainer, rapper, and singer-songwriter.

== Awards and nominations ==
Name of the award ceremony, year presented, award category, recipient of the award, and the result of the nomination
Award ceremony	Year	Nominee / work	Category	Result	Ref.
4Music Video Honours	2012	"Gangnam Style"	Best Video	Nominated	
American Music Awards	2012	"Gangnam Style"	New Media Award	Won	
Asian Pop Music Awards (Note: Hosted by the Hong Kong Asia Pacific International Group and Sunway Records, the Asian Pop Music Awards bases its winners on the "Asian Pop Music Chart" which opened in September 2019.)	2020	"Flower Shower"	Best Lyricist (Overseas)	Nominated	
Billboard Music Awards	2013	"Gangnam Style"	Top Streaming Song (Video)	Won	
Billboard Music Awards	2013	"Gangnam Style"	Top Rap Song	Nominated	
Billboard Music Awards	2013	"Gangnam Style"	Top Dance Song	Nominated	
Billboard Music Awards	2013	Psy	Top New Artist	Nominated	
Billboard Music Awards	2013	Psy	Top Streaming Artist	Nominated	
Billboard Music Awards	2013	Psy	Top Rap Artist	Nominated	
Capricho Awards	2012	"Gangnam Style"	Viral Video of the Year	Won	
CICI Korea Awards	2015	Psy	Star of the Year	Won	
Cyworld Digital Music Awards	2012	"Gangnam Style"	Song of the Month (July)	Won	
Cyworld Digital Music Awards	2012	"Gangnam Style"	Song of the Month (August)	Won	
Gaon Chart Music Awards	2012	"Gangnam Style"	Song of the Year (August)	Won	
Gaon Chart Music Awards	2013	"Gentleman"	Song of the Year (April)	Won	
Gaon Chart Music Awards	2015	"Daddy" (feat. CL)	Song of the Year (December)	Won	
Gaon Chart Music Awards	2015	Psy	Popular Singer of the Year	Nominated	
Gaon Chart Music Awards	2017	"I Luv It"	Song of the Year (May)	Won	
Gaon Chart Music Awards	2017	"New Face"	Song of the Year (May)	Nominated	
Genie Music Awards	2022	"That That" (featuring Suga)	Song of the Year	Nominated	
Genie Music Awards	2022	Psy 9th	Album of the Year	Nominated	
Genie Music Awards	2022	Psy	Singer of the Year	Nominated	
Genie Music Awards	2022	Psy	Genie Music Popularity Award	Nominated	
Genie Music Awards	2022	Psy	Best Male Solo Artist	Nominated	
Golden Disc Awards	2013	"Gangnam Style"	Digital Daesang (Grand Prize)	Won	
Golden Disc Awards	2013	"Gangnam Style"	Digital Bonsang	Won	
Golden Disc Awards	2014	"Gentleman"	Digital Daesang (Grand Prize)	Won	
Golden Disc Awards	2014	"Gentleman"	Digital Bonsang	Won	
Hall of Game Awards	2013	"Gangnam Style"	Amped Up Anthem	Won	
Korean Music Awards	2013	"Gangnam Style"	Musician of the Year	Won	
Korean Music Awards	2013	"Gangnam Style"	Song of the Year	Won	
MAMA Awards	2001	"Bird"	Best New Male Artist	Nominated	
MAMA Awards	2005	"Delight"	Best Video Performer	Won	
MAMA Awards	2006	"Entertainer"	Best Music Video	Won	
MAMA Awards	2006	"Entertainer"	Best Male Artist	Nominated	
MAMA Awards	2010	"Cinderella" (by Seo In-young)	Producer Award	Won	
MAMA Awards	2010	"Right Now"	Best Male Solo Artist	Nominated	
MAMA Awards	2012	"Gangnam Style"	Song of the Year	Won	
MAMA Awards	2012	"Gangnam Style"	Best Music Video	Won	
MAMA Awards	2012	"Gangnam Style"	Best Dance Performance	Won	
MAMA Awards	2012	"Gangnam Style"	Best Male Artist	Nominated	
MAMA Awards	2012	Psy	Favorite International Artist	Won	
MAMA Awards	2012	Psy	Artist of the Year	Nominated	
MAMA Awards	2013	"Gentleman"	Best Music Video	Nominated	
MAMA Awards	2013	"Gentleman"	Song of the Year	Nominated	
MAMA Awards	2013	"Gentleman"	Best Dance Performance – Male Solo	Nominated	
MAMA Awards	2013	Psy	Best Male Artist	Nominated	
MAMA Awards	2013	Psy	Artist of the Year	Nominated	
MAMA Awards	2017	Psy	Best Male Artist	Nominated	
MAMA Awards	2017	"New Face"	Best Dance Performance – Male Solo	Nominated	
MAMA Awards	2017	"New Face"	Song of the Year	Nominated	
MAMA Awards	2022	"That That"	Best Dance Performance – Solo	Won	
MAMA Awards	2022	"That That" (featuring Suga)	Best Collaboration	Won	
MAMA Awards	2022	Psy	Worldwide Fans' Choice Top 10	Won	
MAMA Awards	2022	Psy	Best Male Artist	Nominated	
MAMA Awards	2022	Psy	Yogibo Worldwide Icon of the Year	Nominated	
Melon Music Awards	2010	"Right Now"	Best Performance	Won	
Melon Music Awards	2012	"Gangnam Style"	Song of the Year	Won	
Melon Music Awards	2012	"Gangnam Style"	Best Music Video	Won	
Melon Music Awards	2012	"Gangnam Style"	Top 10 Artists	Won	
Melon Music Awards	2012	"Gangnam Style"	Global Artist Award	Won	
Melon Music Awards	2013	"Gentleman"	Global Artist Award	Won	
Melon Music Awards	2013	"Gentleman"	Hot Trend Award	Nominated	
Melon Music Awards	2017	Psy	Top 10 Artists	Nominated	
Melon Music Awards	2017	Psy	Kakao Hot Star Award	Nominated	
Melon Music Awards	2017	Psy	Artist of the Year	Nominated	
Melon Music Awards	2017	4X2=8	Album of the Year	Nominated	
Melon Music Awards	2022	Psy 9th	Album of the Year	Nominated	
Melon Music Awards	2022	"That That" (featuring Suga)	Song of the Year	Nominated	
Melon Music Awards	2022	Psy	Best Male Solo	Nominated	
MTV Europe Music Awards	2012	"Gangnam Style"	Best Video	Won	
NRJ Music Awards	2013	"Gangnam Style"	International Song of the Year	Won	
NRJ Music Awards	2013	"Gangnam Style"	Music Video of the Year	Won	
NRJ Music Awards	2013	Psy	NRJ Music Award of Honor	Honored	
NRJ Music Awards	2013	Psy	International Breakthrough of the Year	Nominated	
SBS MTV Best of the Best	2013	Psy	Artist of the Year	Nominated	
SBS MTV Best of the Best	2013	Psy	Best Male Solo	Nominated	
Seoul Music Awards	2010	Psy	Best Performance	Won	
Seoul Music Awards	2011	Psy Five	Record of the Year	Won	
Seoul Music Awards	2012	"Gangnam Style"	Daesang Award	Won	
Style Icon Awards	2012	Psy	Style Icon of the Year	Nominated	
World Music Awards	2014	"Gangnam Style"	World's Best Song	Won	

== Other accolades ==
=== State Honours ===
(Order of Cultural Merit, 4th Class, 2012)

=== Recognitions ===
Year	From	Award	Result	Ref.
2009	Military	Military Grand Award	Won	
2011	Department of Defense	Plaque of Appreciation	Won	
2011	1st Korea Music Copyright Target Singer	Songwriter Award	Won	
2011	1st Korea Music Copyright Target Singer (Hip-Hop sector)	Composition Award	Won	

=== World records ===
Key
†	Indicates a formerly held world record (Note: Note that this does not indicate that Psy lost the record, only that the listed record holder (i.e. a music video) was eventually surpassed.)

List of world records received by Psy
Publication	Year	World record	Record holder	Ref.
Guinness World Records	2012	First video to be viewed 1 billion times on YouTube	"Gangnam Style"	
Guinness World Records	2012	† Most viewed video online	"Gangnam Style"	
Guinness World Records	2012	† Most liked video online	"Gangnam Style"	
Guinness World Records	2013	† Most viewed video online in 24 hours	"Gentleman"	
Guinness World Records	2014	First video to be viewed 2 billion times on YouTube	"Gangnam Style"	

=== Listicles ===
Psy's appearances on selected listicles
Publisher	Year	Listicle	Placement	Ref.
Forbes	2013	Korea Power Celebrity	1st	
Forbes	2014	Korea Power Celebrity	13th	
Golden Disc Awards	2025	Golden Disc Powerhouse 40	Placed	
IZM	2025	The 25 Greatest Musicians of the first 25 Years of the 21st Century	Placed	
Korea Federation of Copyright Societies (Note: The Korea Federation of Copyright Societies is an association that consists of 10 organizations, including the Korea Music Copyright Association (KOMCA), the Korean Music Performers Association, the Korean Broadcasting Writers Association, and the Korea Press Foundation, and has a total of 300,000 members.)	2023	Korea World Music Culture Hall of Fame ("Gangnam Style")	Inducted	
Mnet	2013	Legend 100 Artists	Placed	
