= Ssajib =

Ssajib (Cheap House)

Studio album by Psy
- Released: July 24, 2006
- Genre: K-pop; hip-hop; rap rock
- Length: 50:24
- Language: Korean
- Label: Yamazone; Seoul Records
- Producer: Psy

Psy chronology
Remake & Mix 18 Beon (2005)	Ssajib (Cheap House) (2006)	PsyFive (2010)

Singles from Ssajib
- 1. "We Are the One" Released: 2006; 2. "Entertainer" Released: 2006; 3. "Beautiful Goodbye 2" Released: 2006; 4. "Because It's Raining" Released: 2006

Ssajib (Korean: 싸집) is the fourth album by South Korean singer Psy. The album was released on July 24, 2006, through his own label Yamazone Music and distributed by Seoul Records (now known as Kakao M). Ssajib was later released worldwide through iTunes. The album contains 14 songs including the title track "Entertainer". By the end of 2006, the album sold over 50,000 copies in South Korea.

== Background and release ==
Ssajib was released on July 24, 2006. During his first interview regarding the album, he described the album as "a high class hotel buffet" and aimed to "recite himself through different genres. Also, Psy said it was an album that he can be content with and an upgrade to his career." "Instant" is a song that features Kim Tae-woo aims to satirize one night stands, as well as making Kim Tae-woo reborn as an adult star. The song "knock" featuring Ivy is an electro dance song.

Regarding the title song "Entertainer", he described it as a song that is about the worship of girls." The music video for the song "Entertainer" was released on the same day of the album release. Out of 14 songs, all songs except 3 songs ("Yangachi", "Psycho Party", and "Dead Poet's Society") passed the test of the censorship bureau of MBC which startled the singer, since "Instant" and "Drinking" contained references to one night stands and alcohol. For KBS, only 5 songs did not pass the censorship. The album was released in digital disc form which prevents illegal copies.

== Accolades ==
Awards and nominations for "Entertainer"
Organization	Year	Category	Result	Ref.
Mnet KM Music Festival	2006	Best Music Video	Won	
Mnet KM Music Festival	2006	Best Male Artist	Nominated	
Mnet KM Music Festival	2006	Best Music Video Director	Won	

Music program wins
Song	Program	Date
"Entertainer"	Inkigayo (SBS)	August 13, 2006
"Entertainer"	Inkigayo (SBS)	September 10, 2006
"Entertainer"	Inkigayo (SBS)	September 14, 2006
"Entertainer"	M Countdown (Mnet)	September 17, 2006

== Track listing ==
All tracks are written by Psy.

No.	Title	Writer(s)	Length
1.	"Alarm"	Psy	1:14
2.	"Instant (인스턴트)" (featuring Kim Tae-woo)	Psy, Kim Tae-woo	3:32
3.	"Entertainer (연예인)"	Psy	3:25
4.	"Grown Up Person (어른)" (featuring Cho Duk-bae)	Psy, Cho Duk-bae	3:46
5.	"Jump" (featuring Lee Ha-neul)	Psy, Lee Ha-neul	3:04
6.	"They Are Friends (친구놈들아)"	Psy	5:05
7.	"Beautiful Goodbye 2 (아름다운 이별 2)" (featuring Lee Jae-hoon)	Psy, Lee Jae-hoon	4:06
8.	"Yangachi (양아치) [Rebel]"	Psy	3:01
9.	"Drinking (애주가)" (featuring Leessang)	Psy, Leessang	3:28
10.	"We Are the One"	Psy	3:20
11.	"Dead Poets Society (죽은 시인의 사회)" (featuring Dynamic Duo, Drunken Tiger, Tasha)	Psy, Dynamic Duo, Drunken Tiger, Tasha	4:35
12.	"Knock (노크)" (featuring Ivy)	Psy, Ivy	5:34
13.	"Because It's Raining (비오니까)"	Psy	4:47
14.	"Psycho Party (싸이코 파티)"	Psy	3:27
Total length:			50:24

== Charts and sales ==
=== Monthly charts ===
Chart (August 2006)	Peak position
South Korean Albums (RIAK)	2

=== Year-end charts ===
Chart (2006)	Position
South Korean Albums (RIAK)	24

=== Sales ===
Region	Sales
South Korea (RIAK)	50,396
