= PsyFive =

Studio album by Psy
- Released: October 20, 2010; May 16, 2011 (reissue)
- Recorded: 2009–2010
- Genre: K-pop, hip-hop
- Length: 43:04
- Language: Korean
- Label: YG/Mnet; CMBC-9610; KMP Holdings; YGK-0039

Psy chronology
Ssajib (2006)	PsyFive (2010)	Psy 6 (Six Rules), Part 1 (2012)

Singles from PsyFive
- 1. "In My Eyes"; 2. "Thank You"; 3. "Right Now"; 4. "It's Art"

PsyFive (Korean: 싸이파이브) is the fifth album by South Korean singer Psy. The album was released on October 20, 2010. The album contains 12 songs. PsyFive is currently the only PSY album not to be released worldwide through iTunes. It is Psy's debut album for YG Entertainment.

== Track listing ==
No.	Title	Writer(s)	Length
1.	"Mr. Ssa (싸군)"	PSY	4:07
2.	"Right Now"	PSY	3:23
3.	"All Night Long (오늘밤새)"	PSY	3:45
4.	"In My Eyes (내 눈에는)" (featuring Lee Jae-hoon)	PSY, Lee Jae-hoon	3:52
5.	"Thank You" (featuring Seo In-Young)	PSY, Seo In-Young	3:41
6.	"It's Art (예술이야)"	PSY	4:40
7.	"Aflutter (설레인다)"	PSY	3:23
8.	"Night Street in Seoul (서울의 밤거리)" (featuring YDG)	PSY, YDG	3:49
9.	"That's Why (그래서 그랬어)" (featuring Jungyup)	PSY, Jungyup	4:21
10.	"Like Crazy (미치도록)"	PSY	3:23
11.	"Spit It Out (솔직히 까고말해)"	PSY	3:33
12.	"My Wanna Be (나의)"	PSY	3:47
Total length:			43:04

== Charts ==
Album

Comment	Title	Weekly	Yearly	Sales
GAON Album Chart	PsyFive	6	79	25,461

Singles

Comment	Title	Weekly	Yearly	Sales (2010)
GAON Singles Chart	In My Eyes	11	145	1,130,003
GAON Singles Chart	Thank You	16	188	957,657
GAON Singles Chart	Right Now	4	72	1,692,727
GAON Singles Chart	It's Art	51	–	–

Other charted songs

Comment	Title	Weekly
GAON Singles Chart	Mr. Ssa	78
GAON Singles Chart	All Night Long	108
GAON Singles Chart	Aflutter	115
GAON Singles Chart	Night Street in Seoul	114
GAON Singles Chart	That's Why	83
GAON Singles Chart	Like Crazy	113
GAON Singles Chart	Spit It Out	135
GAON Singles Chart	My Wanna Be	141
