= WA-come on- =

ワ -come on-

EP by Lee Jung Hyun
- Released: 2005

Lee Jung Hyun chronology
Passion (2004)	ワ -come on- (2005)	This Is Hyony (2006)

ワ -come on- is Lee Jung Hyun's Japanese mini album. The CD contains seven tracks, all of which were previously Korean hits. The versions found on ワ -come on- have different lyrics, as well as they are in a different language, and the songs are arranged differently. The DVD, which contains the PVs for ワ -come on-, Heaven and Heavy world. This EP reached #38 in the Oricon Weekly Charts.

== Track listing ==
=== CD ===
1. ワ -come on- (Wa -come on-; Come -come on-)
2. DaTo ～パックォ～ (DaTo ～Ba Kkwo～; DaTo ～Change～)
3. GX 339-4
4. 夢 (Yume; Dream)
5. Heaven
6. ワ -come on- (Remix) (Wa -come on- (Remix); Come -come on- (Remix))
7. DaTo ～パックォ～(Remix) (DaTo ～Ba Kkwo~ (Remix); DaTo ～Change～ (Remix))

=== DVD ===
1. ワ -come on- (PV) (Wa -come on- (PV); Come -come on- (PV))(Korean Version)
2. Heaven (PV)（Japanese Live)
3. BaKkwo～ (PV)(Korean Version)
