= Remake & Mix 18 Beon =

Remix album by Psy
- Released: July 23, 2005
- Recorded: 2004–2005
- Genres: K-pop, hip-hop
- Length: 55:53
- Language: Korean
- Labels: Yamazone, Pan Entertainment, EMI Korea; EKLD-0614

Psy chronology
3 Mai (2002)	Remake & Mix 18 Beon (2005)	Ssajib (2006)

Remake & Mix 18 Beon (Korean: REMAKE & MIX 18번; Remake & Mix No. 18) (Note: 18 beon is a Korean slang for "favorite karaokes" which originated from a Japanese term Ohako(十八番)) is the first remix and cover album by South Korean singer Psy. The album was released on July 23, 2005 by Yamazone Music and Pan Entertainment, and distributed by EMI Music Korea. The album contains 16 songs.

== Production and release ==
The album was described by Psy as somewhat between sampling and Remake as he changed genres for the songs that he is remaking.The album was also released to increase his performance repertoire. The album was released with a DVD of his performances at his 2004 concert all night stand. The album was rated 18+ for the DVD.

== Reception ==
Psy's life theater series gained popularity for its different scenarios depicted in the lyrics based on blood type theory.

== Track listing ==
All tracks are written by PSY.

No.	Title	Writer(s)	Length
1.	"Skit - 첩보2"		0:54
2.	"Life Theatre blood type A (인생극장 A형)"	PSY	4:07
3.	"Delight (환희) (Note: Remake of 1988 song with the same korean name by Jung soo ra.)"		3:24
4.	"I've Loved (사랑했어요) (Note: Remake of the song of the same name by Kim Hyun-sik.)"		3:31
5.	"Father (아버지) (Note: Remake of the 2004 song of the same korean name by Lee Seung-gi. The song was produced by and featured Psy.)"		3:29
6.	"While living your life (사노라면) (Note: Remake of the song of the same korean name by singer Kim Hyun-sik. The song is also known by its mistranslated english title sano ramen.)"		4:00
7.	"Someday (언젠가는) (Note: Remake of the song of the same name by singer Lee Sang eun, now also known as the stage name Lee Tzsche.)"		4:09
8.	"Alley (골목길) (Note: Remake of the song of the same name by band Sinchon blues)" (featuring Cho PD)	PSY, Cho PD	3:23
9.	"Urbanite (도시인) (Note: Remake of song Urbanite (도시인) from the 1992 album Home by korean rock band N.EX.T led by singer Shin Hae-chul)"		4:37
10.	"Around Thirty (서른 즈음에) (Note: Remake of the 1994 song with the same name from the album Kim Kwang-Seok Fourth by Kim Kwang-seok)"		5:00
11.	"You in Vague Memory (흐린 기억속의 그대) (Note: Remake of the 1992 song with the same name by Hyun Jin-young)"		4:13
12.	"Already Like This (벌써 이렇게)"		3:21
13.	"Champion (챔피언)"	PSY	4:27
14.	"Life" (featuring Cho PD, Lee Ha-neul, JP, Masta Wu)	PSY, Cho PD, Masta Wu	3:18
15.	"Skit – 첩보"		0:53
16.	"Life Theatre blood type B (인생극장 B 형)"	PSY	3:07
Total length:			55:53
