= Avaholic =

EP by Lee Jung Hyun
- Released: May 19, 2009
- Recorded: 2009
- Genres: K-Pop, pop, dance
- Length: 18:17

Lee Jung Hyun chronology
Love Me (2008)	Avaholic (2009)	007th (2010)

Avaholic is Lee Jung Hyun's Korean minialbum, and her first album to be released in Korea in almost three years. The album's title is a reference to Lee's English name, Ava. A music video for "Crazy" has been filmed. The album cover and photoshoot were shot by the photographer Ken Sax who has worked with the likes of Matt Damon, Heather Headley and Carmen Electra.

== Track listing ==
No.	Title	Length
1.	"Vogue Girl"	3:31
2.	"Crazy"	3:02
3.	"넌 내꺼 (neon neggeo / You're Mine)"	3:34
4.	"2Night"	3:33
5.	"Miro I"	0:59
6.	"Miro II"	3:38
