= 3 Mai =

3 Mai (3 Psy)

Studio album by Psy
- Released: September 19, 2002
- Recorded: 2002
- Genre: K-pop; hip hop
- Length: 47:38
- Language: Korean
- Label: Pan Entertainment

Psy chronology
Ssa2 (2001)	3 Mai (3 Psy) (2002)	Remake & Mix 18 Beon (2005)

Singles from 3 Mai
- 1. "Champion" Released: September 19, 2002; 2. "Paradise" Released: September 19, 2002

3 Mai (Korean: 3마이) is the third studio album by South Korean singer Psy, released on September 19, 2002, by Pan Entertainment. It contains 15 songs, including the two singles "챔피언 (Champion)" and "낙원 (Paradise)". By February 2003, the album sold over 135,000 copies in South Korea.

== Background and release ==
The third album was released in September 2002 with a launch on an internet music site. The title of the album "3 Mai" means cheap. Unlike his previous albums, the lyrics were less explicit. Regarding the change, Psy commented that "3 Mai was intended as a project for taking a break, however, it should not be intended as a change of my personality." Lee Sun-hee, Kim Wan-sun, Park Mi-kyung, and Lee Jae-hoon of Cool featured in the album as vocals, as well as Park Jae-Eun, Psy's older sister.

== Composition ==
The song "로얄패밀리 (Royal Family)" aims to criticize Korean marriage agencies which arrange meetings based on their academic credentials and wealth. The song "안녕히 (Goodbye)" is about his longing for his grandfather who died on the third day of Psy's arrest for marijuana charges. The song "빤빠라 (Celebrities)" aims to criticize politicians using celebrity scandals during elections to gain more votes. The timely release, during Seoul's enthusiasm over the 2002 FIFA World Cup, and a title track "챔피언 (Champion)" with its "crowd-pumping vibe" which became "massively popular", confirmed his place in the Korean music world and on the K-pop scene.

The title song "챔피언 (Champion)" was also inspired by Korean street cheering during the 2002 World Cup. The song's lyrics include the word "ganggangsullae", the name of a traditional Korean folk dance that brings people together in a large circle to dance and play; with the message that "true champions are the ones who know how to have fun." Psy said about the song, "During the World Cup, I saw Korean people really loosen up to just have fun", and "I wanted to encourage that same carefree enjoyment, even without the soccer".

== Critical reception ==
Paul Lester of The Guardian called "챔피언" a "thrashy disco" which heavily samples Axel F by Harold Faltermeyer". Jeff Benjamin of Billboard said, "'챔피언" is a funky dance track that uses video game-like synthesizers years before the EDM explosion. With self-empowering lyrics and the repeated title word in the chorus, the song doubled as an anthem for South Korea when they hosted the World Cup in Seoul that year."

== Legacy ==
Psy continued to perform "챔피언" again and again throughout his career. At Park Geun-hye's 2013 Presidential Inauguration for a televised performance in front of the National Assembly he wore a black tuxedo with a bow tie and sunglasses and opened with "챔피언", followed by "Gangnam Style". In June 2014, he performed the song again, among eight, at a Seoul street concert of nearly 30,000, during celebrations for the 2014 FIFA World Cup, when Korea tied Russia in the first round. He said, "The impassioned cheering of citizens inspired me to write 'Champion.' It's also a song that helped me continue my music career, which would have ended after a short run [if it weren't for 'Champion']. So even though 'Gangnam Style' was such a success, it can't be as dear to me as 'Champion,'" he said.' He expressed his fondness for the song, saying it would always "hold a special place" in his heart, and recounted that ten years later he was putting a lot of effort into making his music that successful again.

=== A different complaint ===
Although its title track "챔피언" was received well by Korean soccer fans, a different complaint was raised for this album, by expat English teachers. At the time of its release and later with a new audience created by 2012's "Gangnam Style", English speaking fans were offended by the repeated use of the word "니가" or ("you" in Korean [pronounced ni-ga]), in the lyrics ("챔피언 소리 지르는 니가"), which they heard as the N-word. After clarification, many thought it an appropriate jab at convention, as Psy had studied in America and spoke English.

== Track listing ==
All tracks are written by Psy, except where noted.

No.	Title	Writer(s)	Length
1.	"Intro" (featuring Ray)	Psy, Ray, hanco	2:34
2.	"안녕히 (Goodbye)" (featuring Lee Sun-hee)		3:24
3.	"챔피언 (Champion)"	Psy	3:06
4.	"빤빠라 (Celebrities)"	Psy	3:17
5.	"반말합시다 (Let's Speak Informally)"	Psy, Lee Jin Sung	3:32
6.	"낙원 (Paradise)" (featuring Lee Jae-hoon)		3:40
7.	"퀸 (Queen)" (featuring Park Jae Eun)	Psy	3:02
8.	"난장 Blues (Chaotic Blues)"	Psy	3:24
9.	"불장난 (Playing with Fire)" (featuring Ray)	Psy, Ray	2:55
10.	"Night" (featuring Park Mi-kyung)	Psy, Yoo Gun-hyung	3:18
11.	"Bitch" (featuring Ray)	Ray, hanco	2:11
12.	"바쳐 (Dedicated)" (featuring Yohan)	Psy, Yohan	3:24
13.	"로얄패밀리 (Royal Family)" (featuring Kirk & Kim Woo-geun)	Psy, Kirk	3:23
14.	"안돼요 (No You Can't)" (featuring Kim Wan-sun)	Psy, hanco	4:13
15.	"Back to the Psycho World! (Outro)"		2:15
Total length:			47:38

== Charts and sales ==
=== Monthly charts ===
Chart (September 2002)	Peak position
South Korean Albums (RIAK)	11

=== Sales ===
Region	Sales
South Korea (RIAK)	135,223
