= V (Lee Jung-hyun song) =

Single by Lee Jung-hyun
- Released: July 22, 2013
- Genre: Dance-pop; house
- Length: 3:14
- Label: AVA Films & Entertainment, CJ E&M
- Songwriter: Lee Jung-hyun
- Producers: PJ; U-Tah; iki

Lee Jung-hyun Korean singles chronology
"Suspicious Man" (2010)	"V" (2013)

Music video
- "V" on YouTube

"V" (Hangul: 브이) is a song by South Korean singer and actress Lee Jung-hyun. It was released digitally on July 22, 2013 with a special edition CD and DVD was released on August 5.

== Charts ==
Chart	Peak position
Gaon Digital Chart	36
Gaon Streaming Chart	65
Gaon Download Chart	21
Gaon BGM Chart	42
Gaon Mobile Chart	53
Gaon Social Chart	16
Billboard Korea K-Pop Hot 100	43

== Track listing ==
No.	Title	Lyrics	Music	Arrangement	Length
1.	"V" (브이)	Lee Jung-hyun	PJ, U-Tah	PJ, U-Tah, iki	3:17

Special Edition DVD
No.	Title	Director	Length
1.	"Making-Of" (메이킹영상)		21:51
2.	"Teaser 1, 2" (티저)	Park Chan-wook, Park Chan-kyong	4:35
3.	"Music Video (Drama Ver.)"	Park Chan-wook, Park Chan-kyong	6:55
4.	"Music Video (Dance Ver.)"	Park Chan-wook, Park Chan-kyong
