= DI Corporation =

South Korean computer chip maker

DI Corp
- Company type: Public
- Traded as: KRX: 003160
- Industry: Semiconductors
- Founded: June 10, 1955
- Headquarters: Gangnam District, Seoul, South Korea
- Key people: Park Won-ho (Executive Chairman)
- Products: Mémoriaux & Logic Burn-In Tester, Wafer Test Board
- Number of employees: 107

DI Corporation is a South Korean company involved in the manufacture and supply of semiconductors test equipment and computer chips. DI stands for Dongil.

== Ownership ==
Its executive chairman is Park Won-ho, father of the K-Pop artist PSY, who released the song "Gangnam Style" in July 2012.

PSY, together with his father, uncle and grandmother own a combined 30 percent of the company. The company's headquarters are located in Gangnam District, Seoul.

== History ==
The company was established on June 10, 1955.

It was listed on the Korea Stock Exchange in 1996.

In 2003, it expanded and began operations overseas with the establishment of DI Japan Corp.

== Meteoric rise of share prices ==
According to Reuters, the company's market capitalization doubled in value after the release of "Gangnam Style", surging to 113.5 billion won ($101.29 million) in late September, 2012.

In October 2012, Bloomberg L.P. reported that the "father-son connection" to the "Gangnam Style" music video has triggered an almost 500 percent rally in shares of DI Corporation. The Economist compared its remarkable surge in share prices with stock market bubbles such as the 17th century Tulip mania.

By the end of 2012, shares of DI corporation have surged eightfold since the release of the song.

== See also ==
- Semiconductor industry in South Korea
