= Right Now (Psy song) =

Single by Psy

from the album PsyFive
- Released: October 20, 2010
- Genre: K-pop; dance; electro hop
- Length: 3:25
- Label: YG Entertainment
- Songwriters: PSY, Yang Hyun-suk
- Producer: Yang Hyun-suk

Psy singles chronology
"Thank You" (2010)	"Right Now" (2010)	"It's Art" (2011)

Music video
- "Right Now" on YouTube

"Right Now" is the third single from Psy's 2010 album PsyFive. It was released on October 20, 2010 by YG Entertainment. In September 2011, The single was banned from under-19 audiences by South Korea's Ministry of Gender Equality and Family for what it deemed an "obscene" lyric, "Life is like toxic alcohol". Despite the ban, Psy received awards during the 2011 Melon Music Awards and Mnet Asian Music Awards.

== Music video ==
There are two music videos for this song, the "PSY version" and the "Seo Woo version".

== Accolades ==
Music program wins
Program	Date
Mnet's M Countdown	November 11, 2010

== Charts ==
Chart (2010–12)	Peak position
Korea Digital (Gaon Chart)	4
Korea Download (Gaon Chart)	3
US World Digital Songs (Billboard)	5

== See also ==
- Gangnam Style
- Gentleman (Psy song)
- Hangover (Psy song)
- YG Entertainment
