= Passion (Lee Jung-hyun album) =

Studio album by Lee Jung Hyun
- Released: June 23, 2004
- Genre: Pop
- Length: 51:51
- Label: PAN Entertainment

Lee Jung Hyun chronology
Summer Party (2003)	Passion (2004)	WA-come on- (2005)

Passion is the fifth studio album by K-Pop singer Lee Jung Hyun. In a change from her previous style, the music is Latin-influenced rather than purely techno. It took a year and a half to complete as Hyun was studying film at Chung-Ang University.

Hyun finished recording by February 2004, and she spent the subsequent four months teaching herself Flamenco dances.

The first two songs Ttarahaebwa and Besame Mucho were composed by Yoon Il-sang.

== Track listing ==
1. World (Intro)
2. 따라해봐 / Ttarahaebwa (Follow Me)
3. 베사메무쵸 / Besame Mucho (Bésame Mucho)
4. 건들지마 / Geondeuljima (Don't Bother Me)
5. A Midsummer Night Dream
6. 기다려 (Interlude) / Gidaryeo (Interlude) (Wait - Interlude)
7. Domino
8. Escape
9. 우린 아직 사랑하고 있다 / Urin Ajik Saranghago Itta (We Still Love Each Other)
10. 일장춘몽 / Iljang Chunmong (An Empty Dream)
11. Moonlight
12. 독백 (Outro) / Dokbaek (Outro) (Monologue - Outro)
13. 따라해봐 Gazebal Trial Mix
14. 건들지마 Ez Life Trance Mix
