= Love Me (Lee Jung-hyun album) =

Love Me 千面女孩
- Love Me cover

Studio album by Lee Jung Hyun
- Released: 11 March 2008
- Genre: Mandopop
- Length: 40:34
- Language: Mandarin
- Label: Ocean Butterflies International

Lee Jung Hyun chronology
Fantastic Girl (2006)	Love Me 千面女孩 (2008)	Avaholic (2009)

Love Me (Chinese: 千面女孩) is Korean popstress Lee Jung Hyun's debut Mandarin studio album and her eighth album release. It was released on 11 March 2008 by Ocean Butterflies International. The album features "千面女孩" (Girl With a Thousand Faces), composed by Yoon Il Sang, and the Chinese cover of "A Perfect Man's Code" and songs from her 2006 K-pop album Fantastic Girl.

== Track listing ==
1. "Fun Fun"
2. "我是你的唯一" (I'm Your Only One)
3. "伱的輪廓" (The Way You Are)
4. "千面女孩" (Girl with a Thousand Faces)
5. "完美男人守則" (The Rules of Perfect Man)
6. "Welcome To My Style"
7. "噴泡" (Bubbles)
8. "男人悤是梁女人煩惱" (Men Annoy Women)
9. "怎麼會這樣" (How)
10. "能否再愛一次" (Will I Be Able To Love Again?)
11. "戀歌" (Love Song)
12. "All In"
