= A Petal =

1996 South Korean film

- Poster for A Petal (1996)
- Hangul: 꽃잎
- RR: Kkonnip
- MR: Kkonnip
- Directed by: Jang Sun-woo
- Written by: Original work: Ch'oe Yoon; screenplay: Jang Moon-Il, Jang Seon-Woo
- Produced by: Park Keon-seop
- Starring: Lee Jung Hyun; Moon Sung-keun
- Cinematography: You Young-gil
- Edited by: Kim Yang-il
- Music by: Won Il
- Distributed by: Miracin Korea
- Release date: April 5, 1996 (South Korea)
- Running time: 101 minutes
- Country: South Korea
- Language: Korean

A Petal (Korean: 꽃잎; RR: Kkonnip) is a 1996 South Korean film directed by Jang Sun-woo.

== Plot ==
The film tells the story of a girl who experienced the Gwangju Uprising at the age of 15, and its effect on her life in later years.

== Cast ==
- Lee Jung-hyun as Girl
- Moon Sung-keun as Jang
- Sul Kyung-gu as Girl's brother
- Chu Sang-mi
- Park Chul-min
- Park Kwang-jung
- Lee Young-ran as Girl's mother

== Production ==
The film was a difficult job for 15-year old Lee Jung-hyun, who wasn't familiar with acting at the time. Director Jang Sun-Woo was furious on the first day of shooting. "At first I wasn't good at acting, so the director threw away the script and stopped shooting. I took it myself and I cried for a long time in the dormitory. Then I woke up. 'Then I have to live like a crazy child,' I thought. Because if I can't act, I simply have no choice but to become that kind of person." So she began wandering around the neighborhood for three or four hours before the shoots. People in the neighborhood thought she was a really crazy child and took her home to wash and feed her. "There was no line between everyday life and acting. It was an ignorant approach. (laughs). The director and Sol Kyung-gu looked at me that way and said, 'Tomorrow is the last shoot, but what if she goes crazy even after she's done?'"

== Awards ==
- Asia Pacific Film Festival (1997) Best Film
- Asia Pacific Film Festival (1996) Best Film
- Bangkok International Film Festival (1998) Jury Award Best Feature Film - Asian Cinema
- Mannheim-Heidelberg International Filmfestival (1996) Prize of the Ecumenical Jury and Special Mention (Jang Sun-woo)
- Rotterdam International Film Festival (1997) KNF Award - Special Mention (Jang Sun-woo)
- Blue Dragon Film Awards (1996) Best Actor (Moon Sung-keun)
- Blue Dragon Film Awards (1996) Best New Actress (Lee Jung-hyun)
- Grand Bell Awards (1996) Best New Actress (Lee Jung-hyun)
- Korean Association of Film Critics Awards (1996) Best New Actress (Lee Jung-hyun)
- Cine 21 Film Awards (1997) Best New Actress (Lee Jung-hyun)

== Bibliography ==
- Kim, Kyung-hyun (2004). "4. Post-Trauma and Historical Remembrance in A Single Spark and A Petal". The Remasculinization of Korean Cinema. Durham and London: Duke University Press. pp. 119–129. ISBN 0-8223-3267-1.
- "A Petal (Kkoch-ip) (1996)". KMDb Korean Movie Database.
