= This Is Hyony =

Studio album by Lee Jung Hyun
- Released: January 25, 2006
- Genre: Pop
- Length: 52:11
- Label: United Asia/Space Shower Music; JKCA-1023

Lee Jung Hyun chronology
| WA-come on- (2005) | This Is Hyony (2006) | Fantastic Girl (2006) |

This Is Hyony is Kpop singer Lee Jung Hyun's first Japanese album. It was released on January 25, 2006. It contains several of her most popular songs, translated into Japanese, along with a selection of previous singles in the original Korean. Some of the songs in Japanese have new musical arrangements.

== Track listing ==
1. ワ-come on- (Wa)
2. Heaven
3. Peace
4. ミチョ (Micho / Mich'yo)
5. タラダラ (Taradara / Dala Dala)
6. アリアリ (Ariari / Ari Ari)
7. DaTo ~パックォ~ (Ba Kkwo / Change)
8. GX 339-4
9. 夢 (Yume / Dream)
10. Passion ~情熱~ (Passion ~Jounetsu~)
11. Heavy world
12. Passion ~情熱~ (New York Remix) (Bonus Track)
