= Let's Go to My Star =

Studio album by Lee Jung-hyun
- Released: October 1999
- Genre: Pop; techno
- Length: 41:37
- Label: HS Media Co., Ltd.
- Producer: Lee Seung-min, Choi Jun-young

Lee Jung-hyun chronology
| Let's Go to My Star (1999) | Untitled (2000) |

Let's Go to My Star is the first album by South Korean singer and actress Lee Jung-hyun. The album was released in October 1999, and spawned the hit singles "Wa" and "Change".

== Track listing ==
Track listing and credits adapted from Melon and the Korea Music Copyright Association song database.

Let's Go to My Star track listing
| No. | Title | Lyrics | Music | Length |
|---|---|---|---|---|
| 1. | "- 00001" | Lee Jung-hyun | Yuta |
| 2. | "GX 339-4" | Lee Jung-hyun | Gang Ho-jeong |
| 3. | "Bird" | Cho PD | Cho PD |
| 4. | "Change" (바꿔) | Choi Jun-young | Choi Jun-young, JK Lee, Yuta |
| 5. | "Wa" (와) | Choi Jun-young | Choi Jun-young |
| 6. | "- 00001.5" | | Yuta |
| 7. | "Ca Tient Moi" | Kim Jin-a | Gang Ho-jeong |
| 8. | "Tinase" (티나세) | Lee Jae-gyeong | Im Ki-hoon, Yuta |
| 9. | "Shock" (충격) | Park In-ho | Park In-ho, Lee Ho-jin |
| 10. | "Trance" | Kim Jin-a | Im Ki-hoon, Yuta |
| 11. | "Karma" (카르마) | Lee Jae-gyeong | Im Ki-hoon, Yuta |
| 12. | "I Love X" | Cho PD, Psy | Cho PD, Psy |
| 13. | "- 00002" | Lee Jung-hyun | Yuta |

== Miscellanea ==
- GX 339-4 is the name of a black hole candidate.
- "I Love X" features rapper Jo PD and is remixed in an uncensored form on PSY's first album as "I Love Sex."
