= I Love Natural =

Studio album by Lee Jung Hyun
- Released: November 4, 2002
- Genre: Pop
- Length: 44:26
- Labels: Pan Entertainment, Yedang Entertainment

Lee Jung Hyun chronology
Magic to Go to My Star (2001)	I Love Natural (2002)	Summer Party (2003)

I Love Natural (stylized as I ♡ Natural) is Korean pop singer Lee Jung-hyun's fourth album, released in 2002.

== Production ==
=== Concept art ===
The album had a "wild girl" theme that some described as a "stone-age nature loving lady" and costumes that broke norms at the time to depict a "wolf girl" persona were worn during the performances.

=== Song descriptions ===
Lot of attempts to fuse traditional Korean songs and technos were made in the album. The main single "Ari Ari" was inspired from the choruses of the Korean traditional song Arirang. Danshimga is a recitation of a sijo by Chŏng Mong-ju, set to the sound of techno beats.

== Track listing ==
1. 단심가 - Danshimga
2. 달아달아 - Dara Dara (Run Away)
3. Q
4. Tell Me
5. Time machine
6. 고향의 봄(interlude feat.박주아)
7. Brighter than Sunshine (Note: Produced by Japanese musician Towa Tei.)
8. Rhythm Nature (Interlude) Featuring: 두드락
9. 아리아리 - Ari Ari
10. 뭘더 바래? - What Do You Want?
11. 미워요 - I Hate You
12. 날봐 - Look At Me
13. Believe
14. Sun Flower
15. To Be Continued
