= Ssa2 =

Ssa2 - For Adults (싸2 | 成人用[성인용])

Studio album by Psy
- Released: January 16, 2002
- Recorded: 2001
- Genre: K-pop, hip-hop, electropop, dance-pop
- Length: 43:11
- Language: Korean, English
- Label: Cream Records
- Producer: Psy

Psy chronology
Psy from the Psycho World! (2001)	Ssa2 - For Adults (싸2 | 成人用[성인용]) (2002)	3 Mai (2002)

Singles from Ssa2
- 1. "Hooray" Released: January 16, 2002; 2. "Welcome Ceremony" Released: January 16, 2002

Ssa2 (Korean: 싸2 - 성인용 (成人用); lit. 'Ssa2 - For Adults') is the second album by South Korean singer Psy, released on January 16, 2002. The album contains 14 songs and was later released worldwide through iTunes. Commercially, the album had sold nearly 74,000 copies by the end of 2002 and was the 76th best-selling album of the year in South Korea.

== Release and controversy ==
After the controversy which surrounded the release of his first album Psy from the Psycho World! in early 2001, and being fined for explicit content, this second album's release at the beginning of 2002 followed in its footsteps. On November 15, 2001, he was arrested for smoking marijuana, ordered to pay 10,000,000 won for his bail and heavy fine of 500,000 won, and spent 25 days in jail. He responded by writing songs about the controversies and government censors complained about the "defiant and obscene lyrics" on his second album.

While the first album contained only one explicit song, half the songs in the new album received explicit warnings and could not be sold to persons under 19. Korean civil groups complained to the government standards board and he was fined again.

== Critical reception ==
Alice Vincent of The Telegraph said the album "sparked complaints from authorities that it would negatively influence children, cementing Psy's reputation for controversy and eccentricity."

== Track listing ==
No.	Title	Writer(s)	Length
1.	"Intro" (featuring Masta Wu, Jed, Ha Dae Hwan, Ray Jay, Yohan)	Psy, Masta Wu, Jed, Ray Jay, Yohan	2:18
2.	"신고식 (Welcome Ceremony) (Note: The original song is "adult ceremony" by korean singer Park Ji-yoon. The lyrics were changed.)"	Psy	3:29
3.	"딜레마 (Dilemma)"	Psy	3:27
4.	"얼씨구 (Hooray)"	Psy	3:03
5.	"Yes, I Am"	Psy	3:20
6.	"해지면 (At Sunset)"	Psy	3:08
7.	"원해 (Desires)"	Psy	2:46
8.	"사우나 속으로 (Into the Sauna)" (featuring Masta Wu)	Psy, Masta Wu	3:11
9.	"1등 (1st Place)" (featuring Yoo Gun-hyung)	Psy	3:13
10.	"새 2 (Bird Pt. 2)" (featuring Kim Jun Hyuk)	Psy, Kim Jun Hyuk	3:17
11.	"나쁜 년 (Bad Bitch)"	Psy	3:06
12.	"처녀논쟁 (The Virgin Debate)" (featuring Ray Jay)	Psy, Ray Jay	3:30
13.	"Basica 2.0"	Psy	3:53
14.	"생 (Life)"	Psy	3:30
Total length:			43:11

== Charts and sales ==
=== Monthly charts ===
Chart (January 2002)	Peak position
South Korean Albums (RIAK)	14

=== Year-end charts ===
Chart (2002)	Position
South Korean Albums (RIAK)	76

=== Sales ===
Region	Sales
South Korea (RIAK)	73,833
