= Fantastic Girl =

Studio album by Lee Jung-hyun
- Released: October 10, 2006
- Genre: K-pop
- Length: 43:54

Lee Jung-hyun chronology
This is Hyony (2006)	Fantastic Girl (2006)	Love Me (2008)

Fantastic Girl is the sixth studio album by South Korean singer Lee Jung-hyun.

Tracks 4, 5, 6, 9, and 10 were featured in Audition Online, a downloadable multiplayer online rhythm dance game developed by T3 Entertainment and published by YD Online. Her outfit and hairstyle in the music video for I Love You, Chul Soo were featured as purchasable avatar accessories in the game.

== Track listing ==
1. FunFun (feat. Double K)
2. 나만봐 (Namanbwa) Just Look at Me
3. 틀 (Teul) Formula
4. 철수야 사랑해 (Cheolsuya Saranghae) I Love You, Chul Soo
5. Welcome to My style
6. 달려 (Dallyeo) Run
7. 남자는 여자를 귀찮게 해 (Namjaneun Yeojareul Gwichankehae) Men Annoy Women
8. 어떻게 (Eotteoke) How
9. 또 사랑할 수 있을까 (Tto Saranghalsu Isseulkka) Will I Be Able To Love Again?
10. 연가 (Yeonga) Love Song
11. All In
12. 니 남자를 줘 (Ni Namjareul Jwo) Give Me Your Man
