= Lee Jung Hyun II =

Studio album by Lee Jung Hyun
- Released: June 1, 2000
- Genre: K-pop
- Length: 53:46
- Label: Yedang Entertainment
- Producer: Lee Seung-min, Oh Sang-beom, Peter Rafelson, Choi Jun-yeong

Lee Jung Hyun chronology
Let's Go to My Star (1999)	Lee Jung Hyun II (2000)	Magic to Go to My Star (2001)

Lee Jung Hyun II is Lee Jung Hyun's untitled second album, it was released on June 1, 2000. It is sometimes called "Peace", "Lee Jung Hyun 2nd", or "You" since its official title was never revealed.

== Track listing ==
Track listing and credits adapted from Melon and the Korea Music Copyright Association song database.

Let's Go to My Star track listing
No.	Title	Lyrics	Music	Length
1.	"Message I - Intro"	Lee Jung-hyun	Yuta	1:16
2.	"Peace" (평화)	Lee Jung-hyun	Gang Ho-jeong	3:40
3.	"Feel Me!"	Peter Rafelson, Lee Jung-hyun, Kim Jin-a	Peter Rafelson	5:01
4.	"You" (너)	Choi Jun-young	Choi Jun-young	3:30
5.	"Give to You" (줄래)	Yu Yu-jin	Yun Il-sang	3:42
6.	"Tta" (따)	Lee Jung-hyun	Perry	4:04
7.	"Dream" (꿈)	Kim Jin-a	Gang Ho-jeong	4:12
8.	"Eat Well, Live Well..." (잘먹고 잘살아라...)	Lee Jung-hyun	Gong In-seok, G-RU, Lee Yong-jun, Ahn Seong-hun, Lee Kyoung-min	4:10
9.	"No" (아냐)	Lee Hyun-do	Lee Hyun-do	4:00
10.	"It's Over" (끝났어)	Kim Jin-a	Yuta, PJ	3:44
11.	"Challenge" (도전)	Jo Jin-gwang	Jo Seong-jin	3:33
12.	"Blooming" (피어)	Lee Jung-hyun	Sim Sang-won	4:22
13.	"Love Is A Secret"	Kim Jin-a, Lee Jung-hyun	Peter Rafelson	4:20
14.	"You (Techno Ver.)" (너 (Techno Ver.))	Choi Jun-young	Choi Jun-young	3:22
15.	"Message II - Outro"	Lee Jung-hyun	Yuta	0:51
Total length:				53:46
