= Lee Jung Hyun 007th =

Studio album by Lee Jung Hyun
- Released: May 11, 2010
- Genre: K-pop
- Label: AVA Entertainment
- Producer: Lee Seung-min, Choi Jun-yeong

Lee Jung Hyun 007th is Lee Jung Hyun's seventh album.

The title relates to her as a killer whom she tries to kill her boyfriend who betrays her for another woman. The title song "Suspicious Man" (수상한 남자) brought many Korean people's attention. Unlike her previous mini album "Avaholic" she brings back her previous style of music. The song "연 (緣)" is the first ballad song that she ever added to her albums.

== Track listing ==
| No. | Title | Length |
|---|---|---|
| 1. | "Intro" |
| 2. | "수상한 남자 (Suspicious Man)" |
| 3. | "이니미니마니모 (Eenie-Meenie-Miney-Moe)" |
| 4. | "Vogue Girl (It Girl)" |
| 5. | "왜 이래 (Why Are You Doing This?)" |
| 6. | "연 (緣) (Reason)" |
| 7. | "Crazy" |
| 8. | "AVAtar" |
| 9. | "넌 내꺼 (You're Mine)" |
| 10. | "2Night" |
| 11. | "Miro I" |
| 12. | "Miro II" |
