= Lee Jae-hoon (singer) =

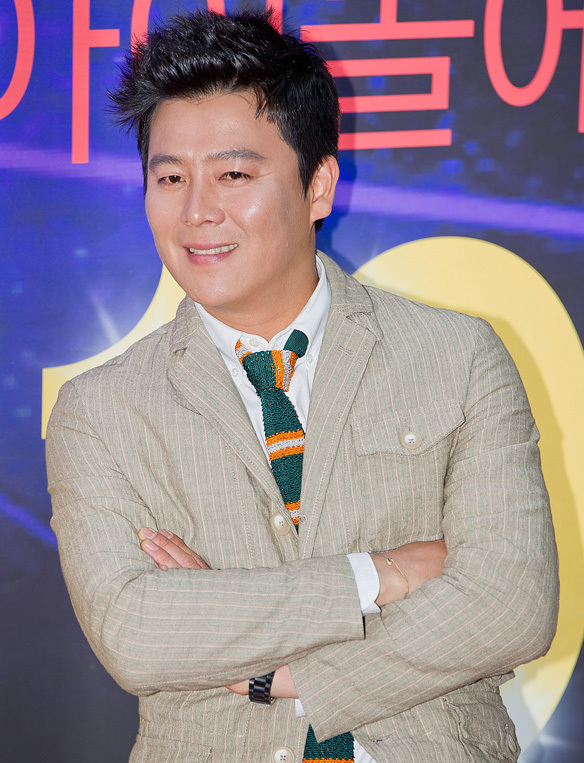
- Lee in 2012

Background information
- Born: July 30, 1974 (age 51); Seoul, South Korea
- Genres: K-pop, Dance pop
- Occupations: Singer
- Years active: 1994-present

Lee Jae-hoon (Korean: 이재훈; born July 30, 1974) is a South Korean singer and television personality. He is a member of the band Cool.

== Biography ==
Jae-hoon revealed in his fancafe on February 5, 2020 that he married his long-term girlfriend back in 2009. His daughter was then born in 2010 and his son in 2013.

== Discography ==
=== Studio albums ===
Title	Album details	Peak chart positions	Sales
Title	Album details	KOR	Sales
First Album	Released: February 1, 2007; Label: Zero One Interactive; Format: CD, cassette	8	KOR: 14,104

=== Extended plays ===
Title	Album details	Peak chart positions	Sales
Title	Album details	KOR	Sales
First Whisper	Released: December 21, 2009; Label: Cool; Format: CD, digital download	51	—
20 Years of Cool	Released: September 1, 2014; Label: Cool; Format: CD, digital download	4	KOR: 3,408

=== Singles ===
Title	Year	Peak chart positions	Album
Title	Year	KOR	Album
"Fantasy" (환상)	2007	—	First Album
"Snow's Gift" (눈의 선물) feat. Narsha	2009	—	First Whisper
"Two Of Us" (둘이서) with J.ae	2011	39	Non-album single
"I Wonder If I Can Forget" (잊을 수 있을까)	2012	41	20 Years of Cool
"Sleepless Rainy Night" (잠못드는 밤 비는 내리고) feat. Funny Funkiz	2012	61	20 Years of Cool
"I Should Hate You" (미워할 걸 그랬죠)	2012	55	20 Years of Cool
"Are You All Okay?" (안녕들 한가요?)	2014	62	20 Years of Cool
"Peter Pan" (철부지)	2017	—	Non-album single
"—" denotes release did not chart.
