= Psy =

South Korean singer (born 1977)

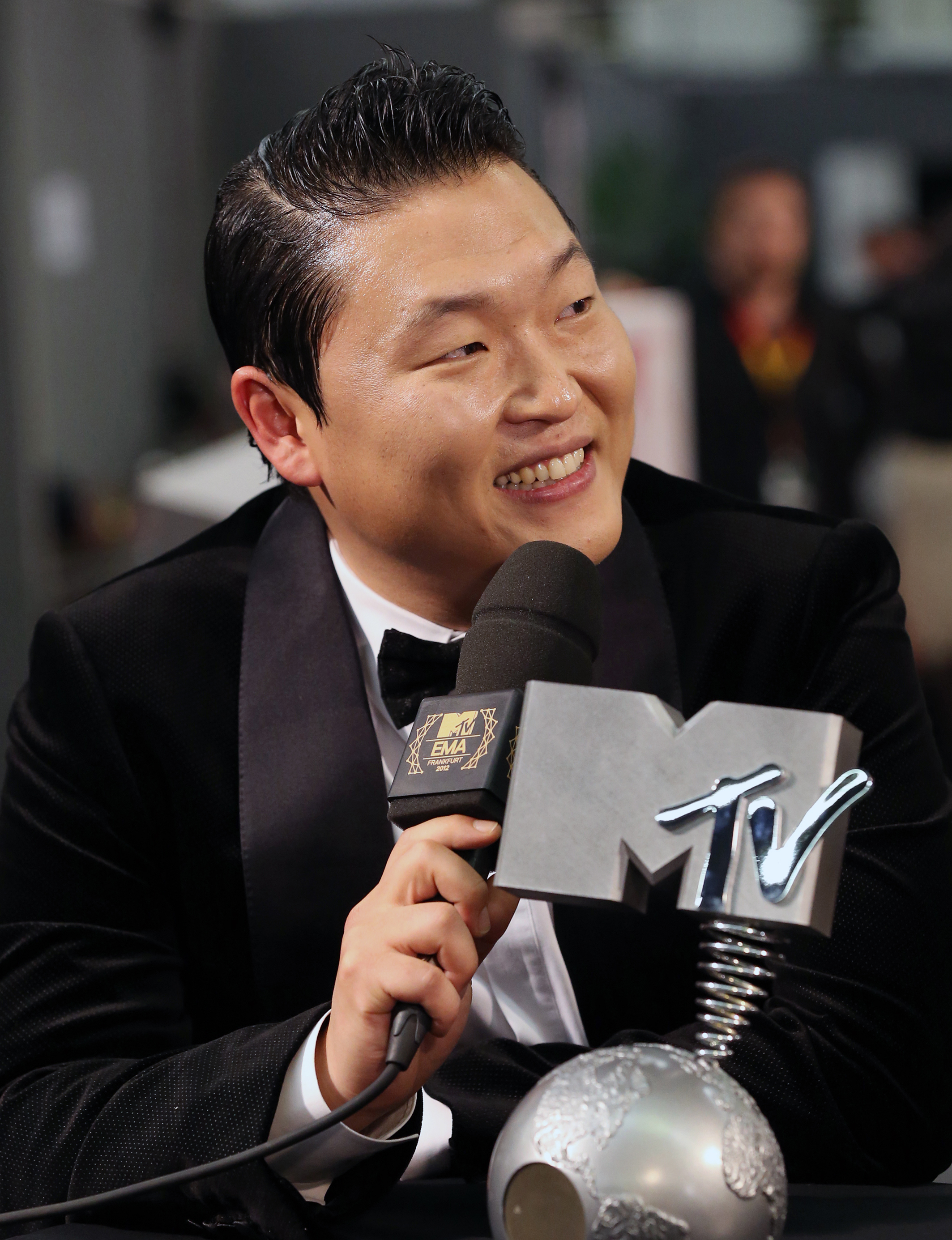
- Psy in 2012
- Born: Park Jae-sang; December 31, 1977 (age 48); Seoul, South Korea
- Occupations: Singer; songwriter; record producer
- Years active: 1999–present
- Organization: P Nation
- Spouse: Yoo Hye-yeon (m. 2006)
- Children: 2
- Honours: Okgwan Order of Cultural Merit (2012)
- Musical career
- Genres: K-pop; hip-hop
- Labels: Bidman; LNLT; Pan; Yamazone; YG; P Nation; Avex Trax; Republic; Schoolboy

Korean name
- Hangul: 박재상
- Hanja: 朴載相
- RR: Bak Jaesang
- MR: Pak Chaesang
- IPA: [pɐk̚.t͈ɕɛsɐŋ]

Stage name
- Hangul: 싸이
- RR: Ssai
- MR: Ssai
- IPA: [s͈ai]

Park Jae-sang (Korean: 박재상; born December 31, 1977), better known as Psy (/ˈsaɪ/ SY; 싸이), is a South Korean singer, songwriter, and record producer. He has received numerous accolades, including an American Music Award, a World Music Award, and 10 MAMA Awards. He is the founder of the talent agency P Nation.

Psy released his debut studio album Psy from the Psycho World! in 2001. He gained international prominence in 2012 with the hit single "Gangnam Style", which reached the top 10 on the U.S. Billboard Hot 100 and became a global viral phenomenon. Its music video was the first on YouTube to reach 1 billion views; it held the record for most-viewed YouTube video from November 2012 to July 2017. Psy's followup, 2013's "Gentleman", also reached the top 10 of the Hot 100 and its video set a new record for YouTube views in its first 24 hours.

He is a recipient of the Okgwan (4th Class) Order of Cultural Merit.

== Early life ==
Park Jae-sang was born into a wealthy family in the Gangnam District of Seoul on December 31, 1977, the son of Kim Young-hee, who owns several restaurants in Gangnam, and Park Won-Ho, who is the executive chairman of manufacturing company DI Corporation. He is a member of the Milyang Park clan. He attended Banpo (반포) Elementary and Middle Schools and Sehwa (세화) High School, but disliked school and was known as the class clown.

Park later told Alina Cho that he was introduced to foreign pop music by a Korean TV show he watched when he was 15 years old, with one particular episode showing the English rock band Queen's 1986 concert video Queen Live at Wembley Stadium, which he said sparked his love for music.

== Music career ==
=== 1996–2000: Brief study in the U.S. and career beginnings ===
As part of preparations to take over DI Corporation from his father, Park had originally planned to study business administration at Boston University in 1996. However, upon his arrival in Boston, he lost interest in his studies, spending his remaining tuition funds on musical instruments and entertainment equipment, including a computer, an electric keyboard, and a MIDI interface. After attending an English-language summer course and studying for one semester, Park dropped out of Boston University and applied to study at Berklee College of Music instead. During his time at Berklee, Park took core curriculum lessons in ear training, contemporary writing and music synthesis, but he soon dropped out and returned to South Korea to pursue a career as a singer, without having attained a degree from either Boston University or Berklee.

Psy was found by South Korean rapper zoPD and featured in the song "카사노바" from his second album In Stardom Version 2.0 in 1999. In South Korea, Psy made his first appearance on Korean national television in 2000 after his dancing caught the eye of a TV producer.

=== 2001–2002: Psy from the Psycho World!, controversy, and domestic success ===
In January 2001, Psy debuted his full-length album Psy from the Psycho World!, for which he was fined by South Korean government authorities due to his album's "inappropriate content". Psy was a rookie hip-hop singer that stirred up the Korean pop music scene with very blunt lyrics, peculiar dance moves, and an unconventional appearance that earned him the nickname "The Bizarre Singer" (엽기가수).

His second album Sa 2 also created controversy upon its release in 2002, earning complaints from civil groups due to the potentially negative influence his album would have on children and teenagers. Since then, Psy has been thought of as a controversial artist, and Sa 2 was banned in 2002 from being sold to the under-19 set. In September of the same year, Psy released his third album 3 Psy. The album's title song, "Champion", saw great success partly due to the hype from the World Cup games held in Seoul. Despite the significant amount of controversy surrounding his music, Psy was awarded songwriting accolades at the annual Seoul Music Awards, marking his breakthrough in the South Korean music industry.

=== 2003–2009: Military service, Ssajib, and re-enlistment ===
In 2003, Psy was conscripted into the South Korean military as part of mandatory military service imposed on all South Korean men aged 18 to 35. Psy was excused from military duty due to working at a software development company (the South Korean government grants exemptions to those with technical expertise working in companies that serve the national interest). He was expected to be released from duties in 2005. In 2006, Psy released his fourth album Ssajib, which won honors at the 2006 SBS Music Awards and Hong Kong's Mnet Asian Music Awards.

In 2007, state prosecutors accused Psy of "neglecting" his work, holding concerts and appearing on local television networks during his period of prior employment. On October 12, 2007, the Seoul Administrative Court decided that Psy must be redrafted, rejecting a lawsuit filed by Psy against the Military Manpower Administration (MMA) in August. Two months later, Psy was re-drafted into the military where he had held the rank of Private First Class and served as a signalman in the 52nd Army Infantry Division, before being released from duties in July 2009.

=== 2010–2012: Fifth studio album and debut performance in Japan ===
Owing to financial difficulties, Psy could no longer release his own songs. His wife encouraged him to join the South Korean music label YG Entertainment, whose founder and chief executive officer Yang Hyun-suk was an old friend of Psy's. In 2010, Psy joined YG Entertainment. Psy released his fifth album PsyFive in 2010, and its lead single "Right Now" was banned from under-19 audiences by South Korea's Ministry of Gender Equality and Family for what it deemed an "obscene" lyric, "Life is like toxic alcohol". Despite the ban, Psy received awards during the 2011 Melon Music Awards and Mnet Asian Music Awards. Psy had, up until this point, topped domestic music charts half a dozen times throughout his twelve-year career in South Korea.

On January 7, 2012, Psy performed alongside K-pop bands Bigbang and 2NE1 in front of 80,000 Japanese fans during the YG Family Concert in Osaka. His performance was broadcast by Mezamashi TV (mezamashi meaning "wake-up alarm"), a Japanese news magazine show produced by Fuji Television. This marked his first appearance on a foreign broadcasting network. During the concert, Psy introduced himself to his Japanese fans with a sign that read "I'm a famous singer well known for driving the audience wild in Korea, but here, today, I'm just a little chubby newcomer" and sang five of his hit songs while Japanese TV commentators expressed their approval in their astonishment at his humorous incorporation of the moves of Lady Gaga and Beyoncé.

=== 2012–2013: "Gangnam Style" and international breakthrough ===
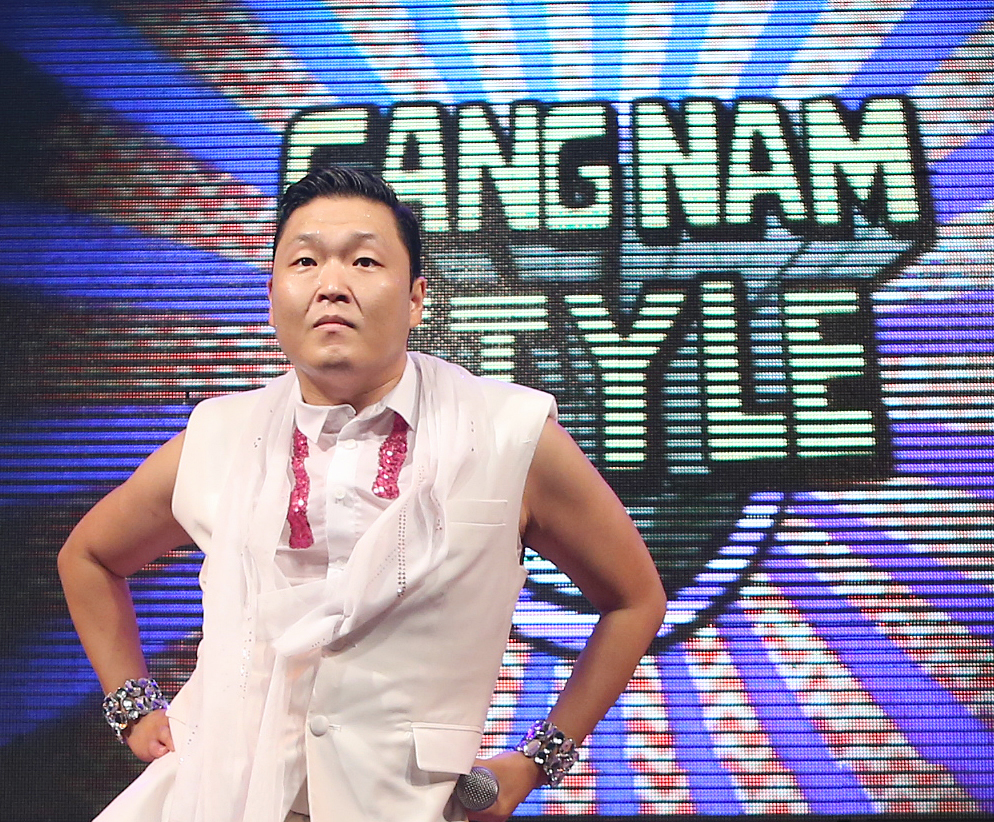
Psy with the Gangnam Style logo

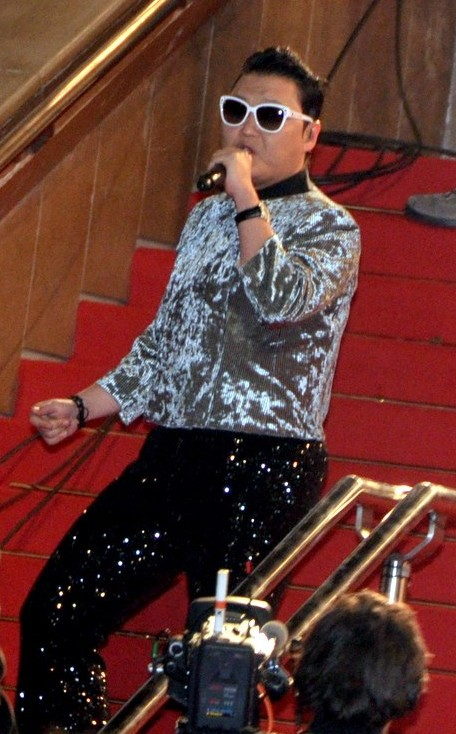
Psy performing in Cannes, France, at the January 2013 NRJ Music Awards ceremony

In July 2012, Psy released his sixth album Psy 6 (Six Rules), Part 1 and the song "Gangnam Style" appeared in broadcasting networks and newspapers outside Asia. On August 14, "Gangnam Style" ranked first on YouTube's "Most Viewed Videos" monthly chart; on August 21, 2012, "Gangnam Style" officially charted No. 1 on the iTunes Music Video Charts, overtaking Justin Bieber's "As Long as You Love Me" and Katy Perry's "Wide Awake"; this feat was the first for a South Korean artist. After the video went viral, celebrities quickly jumped on board, with Katy Perry, Britney Spears, and Tom Cruise taking to Twitter to share their delight. The Gangnam Style phenomenon has also popularized his older music videos, such as "Right Now". On September 14, 2012, he appeared on The Today Show on NBC in New York City, performing the song live and teaching dance moves to the anchors. The following day, he also made a cameo appearance on Saturday Night Live during a skit featuring "Gangnam Style". Commenting on his popularity among foreign celebrities, Psy said:

When I realized that some top stars like have imagined or tweeted about me, I thought, "That's joking. That's not gonna happen" ... I never expect things like this, not because they are top stars, but because this is the biggest market in the universe for pop music, right, so everybody's dreaming about having appearance in the U.S. so I'm still saying, "What going on here? This is beautiful."

Riding high on the success of "Gangnam Style", Psy was signed by Scooter Braun to Braun's Schoolboy Records, a label distributed by Republic Records. In early September, the Gangnam district awarded Psy with a plaque and named him an honorary ambassador. On October 24, 2012, Psy was recognized by the United Nations as an "International sensation". According to Reuters, U.N. Secretary General Ban Ki-moon scheduled a meeting with Psy in the belief that music has great power to overcome intolerance. On October 23, 2012, they met at the United Nations Headquarters where Ban expressed his desire to work with Psy. He remarked that Psy has an "unlimited global reach" and said, "I hope that we can work together using your global reach".

According to Korean newspaper The Dong-A Ilbo, Psy was appointed as a goodwill ambassador of the United Nations Children's Fund (UNICEF).

On November 7, 2012, Psy gave a talk at the Oxford Union in England to discuss the inspiration behind "Gangnam Style" and his next album. He told the audience that due to the success of "Gangnam Style" he is now living in both a dream and a nightmare, as it will be difficult for his next song to equal "Gangnam Style"'s success. He also talked about his early life and the moment he realized "Gangnam Style" became famous. According to The Independent, tickets for his speech were "in such demand they had to be assigned by ballot—a method not required when former presidential candidate John McCain spoke earlier that year, nor when Mother Teresa, the Dalai Lama nor Michael Jackson spoke".

On November 12, 2012, Psy became the second South Korean music artist to appear at the MTV Europe Music Awards where he performed "Gangnam Style" and held off competition from Rihanna, Katy Perry, and Lady Gaga to win the "Best Video" award. The event was broadcast worldwide and hosted by the German model and actress Heidi Klum, who introduced Psy to the audience as the "undisputed King of Pop". A few days later, American singer-songwriter Madonna performed a mashup of "Gangnam Style" and "Give It 2 Me" alongside Psy and her backup dancers during a concert in New York City at Madison Square Garden during The MDNA Tour. Psy later told reporters that his gig with Madonna had "topped his list of accomplishments".

On November 24, 2012, "Gangnam Style" became the most viewed video in YouTube history, surpassing the previous most-watched video, Justin Bieber's "Baby". The number of views was achieved about eleven times faster than Bieber's. Psy later won four awards at the 2012 Mnet Asian Music Awards in Hong Kong on November 30, 2012. On December 21, 2012, "Gangnam Style" reached 1 billion views on YouTube, becoming the first video to do so in the website's history. He met actor and stunt performer Jackie Chan, who called him a role model that proved that "dreams do come true". Also, he was selected as Singer of the Year in the public survey conducted by Gallup Korea that year.

In January 2013, Psy was announced as a winner of the 2013 Korea Image Awards, being awarded the Korea Image Stepping Stone Award for "his contribution to enhancing the national image". Psy made his debut on South American television by giving an interview on the Brazilian news program Fantástico. It was announced on January 27, 2013, that Psy would perform at South Korea's presidential inauguration ceremony on February 25, 2013.

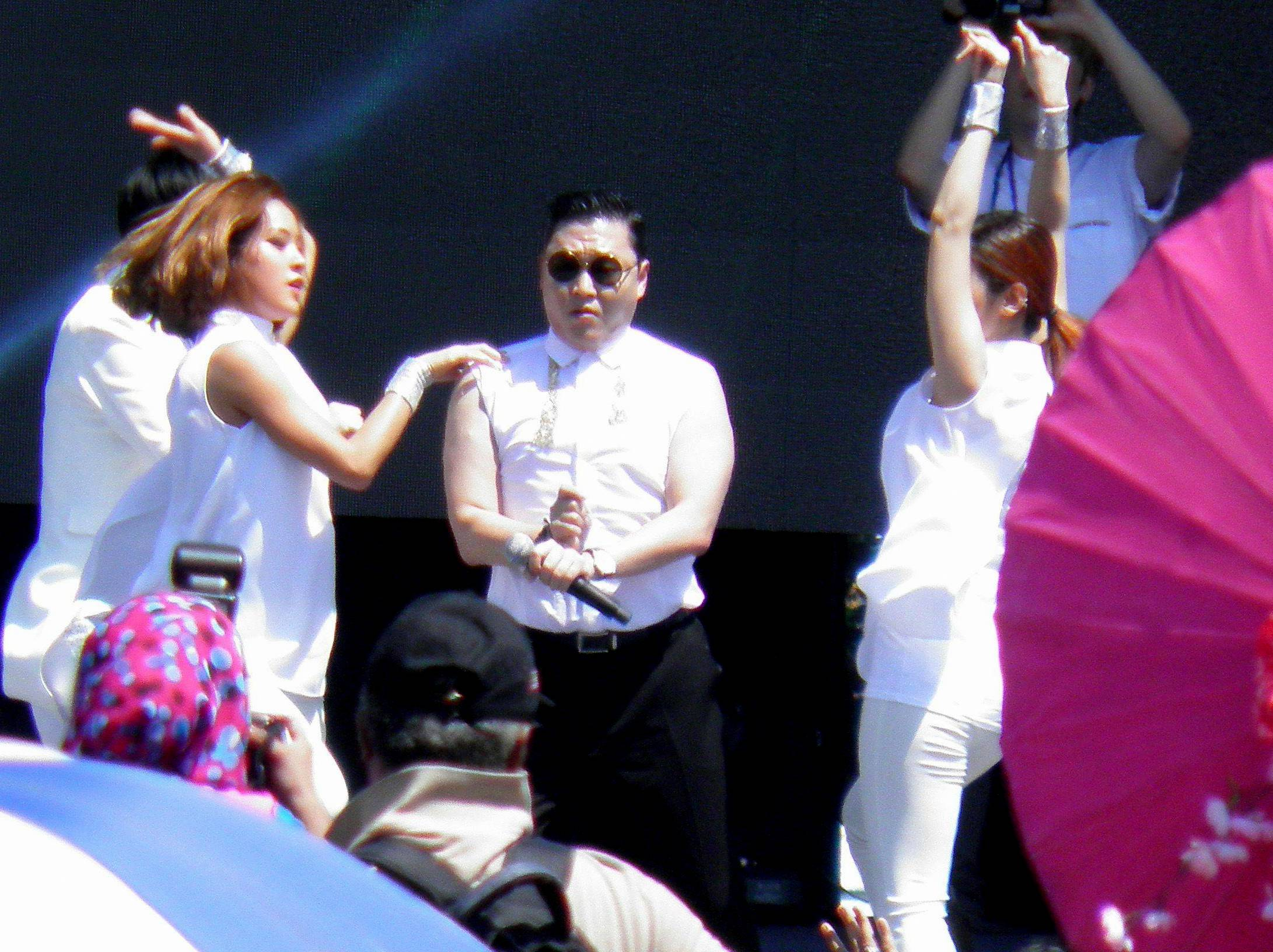
Psy performing in George Town, Penang, Malaysia on February 11, 2013

Psy was invited to perform for the ruling Barisan Nasional (BN) party in George Town, Malaysia on February 11, 2013, in an attempt to reach out to young voters in the area. Media reports estimated a cost of at least US$300,000 for the performance. Opposition backers called for supporters of the Malaysian Democratic Action Party to attend wearing opposition colors. Despite the controversy and calls by Malaysian citizens to cancel the concert, Psy completed a 10-minute performance for a Chinese New Year open house at Han Chiang School in front of 100,000 people.

Following the concert, a media report revealed that Psy had received death threats prior to entering Malaysia, which delay in his onstage appearance. At a press conference, BN party chief Teng Chang Yeow said that the event "was sponsored by private sponsors who preferred to remain anonymous as they are afraid of being 'victimised' if their identities were revealed". Teng also stated that he was given the choice of a Justin Bieber visit but chose Psy as he did not know who Bieber was at the time.

=== 2013–2014: "Gentleman", "Hangover", YouTube record ===
In March 2013, South Korean media reported that the title of Psy's upcoming single would contain the word "Assarabia", a slang used by South Koreans to express thrills, or simply to describe something satisfying. The title raised concerns that Arab people might misinterpret the title and find it derogatory. After being questioned by a correspondent of the Voice of America about the title's potential to offend, Psy said that there was some misunderstanding and his upcoming song will undergo a major revamp.

On April 12, 2013, the audio of Psy's follow-up single "Gentleman" was leaked onto the internet, a day before its official international release. On the following day, the music video for 'Gentleman' premiered at Psy's 'Happening' Concert, which was attended by 50,000 people and live streamed on YouTube to an audience of 150,000. Guest performers of the concert included Lee Hi, 2NE1 and G-Dragon. He reportedly invested US$2.7 million into the production of the concert. Psy continued to promote Gentlemen throughout 2013. In May 2013, PSY appeared twice on Live! with Kelly and Michael and taught Kelly Ripa and Michael Strahan how to do the Gentleman Dance. Psy also appeared in the finale of American Idol season 12 and sang "Gentleman". Psy also performed his song "Gentleman" on the Finale of Dancing With the Stars, Season 16. Five days later, Psy also performed at the final match of the 2012–13 Coppa Italia. On June 8, 2013, Psy and his troupe performed "Gentleman" on the Finale of Britain's Got Talent, Series 7. Later that month, on June 8, Psy co-hosted the Canadian MuchMusic Video Awards, where he also opened the show with his worldwide hit "Gangnam Style" and ended the show with his "official last performance of 'Gentleman' on TV."

Psy was slated to star in a South Korean remake of the Hindi film ABCD: Any Body Can Dance, taking over the role of Vishnu (Prabhu Deva) in the original film. In April he became the tourism ambassador of South Korea for 2013. On May 9, Psy gave a special lecture at Harvard University. In this lecture, he spoke about his passion and other reasons for his popularity. On May 24, 2013, people began voting daily, at www.psygobibigo.com, for one of the Top Three Chefs, based on more than one hundred ninety video entries, in Psy's "Psy Needs a Chef" video contest. The Top Three Chefs in this contest were Aaron Contreras, Dj Park and Ricardo Caput. Voting ended June 10, 2013, at midnight Greenwich Mean Time. Aaron Contreras received 2,005 votes. Ricardo received 22,384 votes. Dj Park, won the popular vote with 22,533 votes. Winners were to be announced June 14, 2013. However, Psy postponed his decision until June 18, 2013, and chose Ricardo to be his chef, in spite of the popular vote.

On June 9, 2014, Psy released a new single, "Hangover", featuring American rapper Snoop Dogg, and announced his intention to release a new song titled "Father".

On December 1, 2014, the YouTube video for "Gangnam Style" garnered over 2^{31} − 1 views, overflowing the YouTube counter to a negative number, resulting in a public comment from Google/YouTube saying "We never thought a video would be watched in numbers greater than a 32-bit integer (=2,147,483,647 views), but that was before we met PSY. "Gangnam Style" has been viewed so many times we had to upgrade to a 64-bit integer (9,223,372,036,854,775,808)!" Hovering over the counter of the YouTube video triggered an easter egg. A YouTube representative later revealed that the comment was a joke and that the company had already updated to a 64-bit integer months ago.

=== 2015–2018: Chiljip PSY-da, 4X2=8, and departure from YG Entertainment ===
On March 28, 2015, he released a music video for his song Father. On December 1, 2015, Psy released his seventh album titled Chiljip PSY-da, with double title tracks "Daddy" and "Napal Baji". The album included features from label mate CL as well as Will.i.am Promotions for the album included two performances on Inkigayo, where the single "Daddy" won a triple crown, as well as a performance on You Hee-yeol's Sketchbook. "Daddy" was also included in the dance video game Just Dance 2017.

In May 2017, Psy released his eighth studio album, 4X2=8, with lead singles "I Luv it" and "New Face". The album features collaborations from several artists including label-mates G-Dragon and Taeyang. The music video for "I Luv It" featured actor Lee Byung-hun and comedian Pikotaro while for the "New Face" video Apink's Son Na-eun played the title role.

On May 15, 2018, Psy officially left YG Entertainment after eight years.

=== 2019–present: P Nation, Loud, and Psy 9th ===
In 2019, he founded his own label P Nation. He signed his first artist Jessi on January 25, 2019. Two days later, on January 27, 2019, he also signed both Hyuna and Dawn, formerly of Cube Entertainment with the latter being a former member of Pentagon under the name E'Dawn. He also signed Crush on July 17, 2019, and Heize on September 16, 2020. On April 26, 2021, it was reported that he and Park Jin-young, the founder of JYP Entertainment, will collaborate to form a new boy group each in Loud, which premiered on June 5, 2021, on SBS. In 2022, Psy did his first concert in Dubai as part of the Expo 2020 on Korean national day event.

On April 29, 2022, Psy released his ninth studio album, Psy 9th, with its lead single "That That" featuring Suga of BTS.

On June 10, 2022, Psy released the official SNS afternoon tour schedule of Psy Soak Show Summer Swag 2022, a domestic tour of 7 cities in the country until August 20.

== P Nation ==
Following Psy's departure from YG Entertainment in 2018, Psy founded his own entertainment company, P Nation. Psy announced the first artist signed to his label in January 2019, the rapper Jessi. P Nation then signed Hyuna and Dawn, both formerly of Cube Entertainment.

As of November 2022, the label had 10 artists signed to the label, including the six-member boy band, TNX. The record label is located in the Gangnam area.

== Image ==
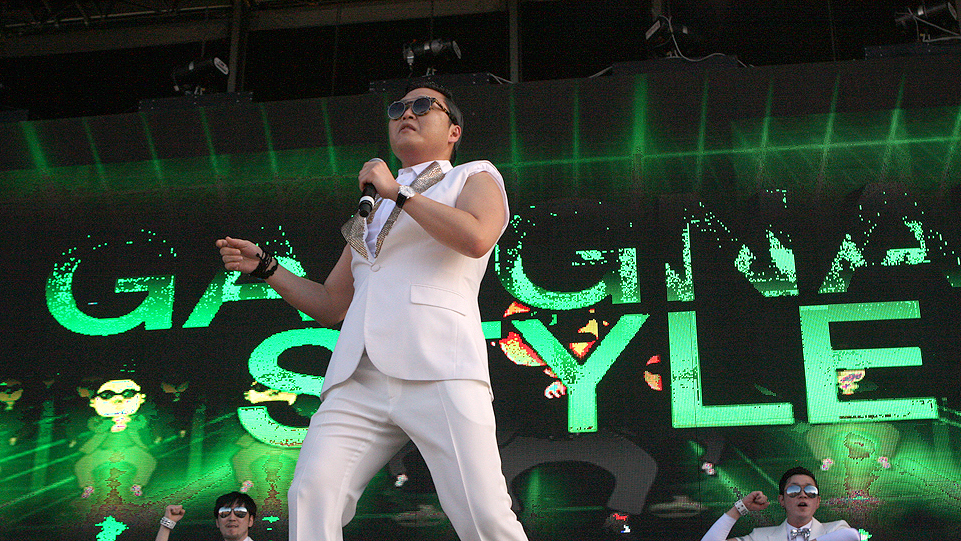
Psy performing in Sydney

The stage name "Psy" derives from the word "psycho". Explaining his stage name, he told the BBC that it is specifically a reference to being "crazy about music, dancing, performance [...] that kind of psycho". He considers "Gangnam Style" to be his greatest achievement.

In a 2012 interview with The New York Times, Psy cited Freddie Mercury as his biggest musical influence: "My lifetime role model and hero is Freddie Mercury of Queen. His songwriting skills, I cannot even approach, but his showmanship, I learned it from videos. I'm No. 1 in the UK right now, so if I have any chance to go there, I want to meet Queen and to tell them how much I got inspired by their music." He also named American actor Tom Cruise as the celebrity he wants to meet the most, after Cruise helped popularize "Gangnam Style" on Twitter and asked whether Psy would "make a good future co-star".

Psy is known for his sense of humor during his concerts, often imitating the dance moves of female pop stars such as Park Ji-yoon, Lee Hyo-ri, Lady Gaga, and Beyoncé. Although his music is almost entirely K-pop, Beth Hong from The Vancouver Observer noted that he does not fit the standard K-pop idol image of being "incredibly young, good-looking, and able to carry a melodramatic note". Lucy Williamson of the BBC recognized Psy as South Korea's "newest and biggest music star" but described him as "unpolished, unpredictable, and he doesn't look like your typical Korean idol". Sarah Charlton from Reuters called him a "chubby South Korean pop singer" who found fame and popularity in a "sea of pretty K-pop stars".

Chelsea Handler jokingly described Psy as "Korea's Ricky Martin, as well as a sex symbol" during his introduction on her show, while Gil Kaufman from MTV described him as one of the "biggest pop sensations in the world". In South Korea, some have called him the "Bizarre Singer", while others consider him to be "the antithesis of what is popular in Korean pop music".

== Legacy ==
"I think that Psy's music has given the world, and people here in Britain, a glimpse of the dynamism and vibrancy of modern Korea. It has shown a nation of colour, creativity and confidence. … I see Psy's success as representing just one small fragment of today's Global Korea."

— British politician Hugo Swire on PSY (2012).

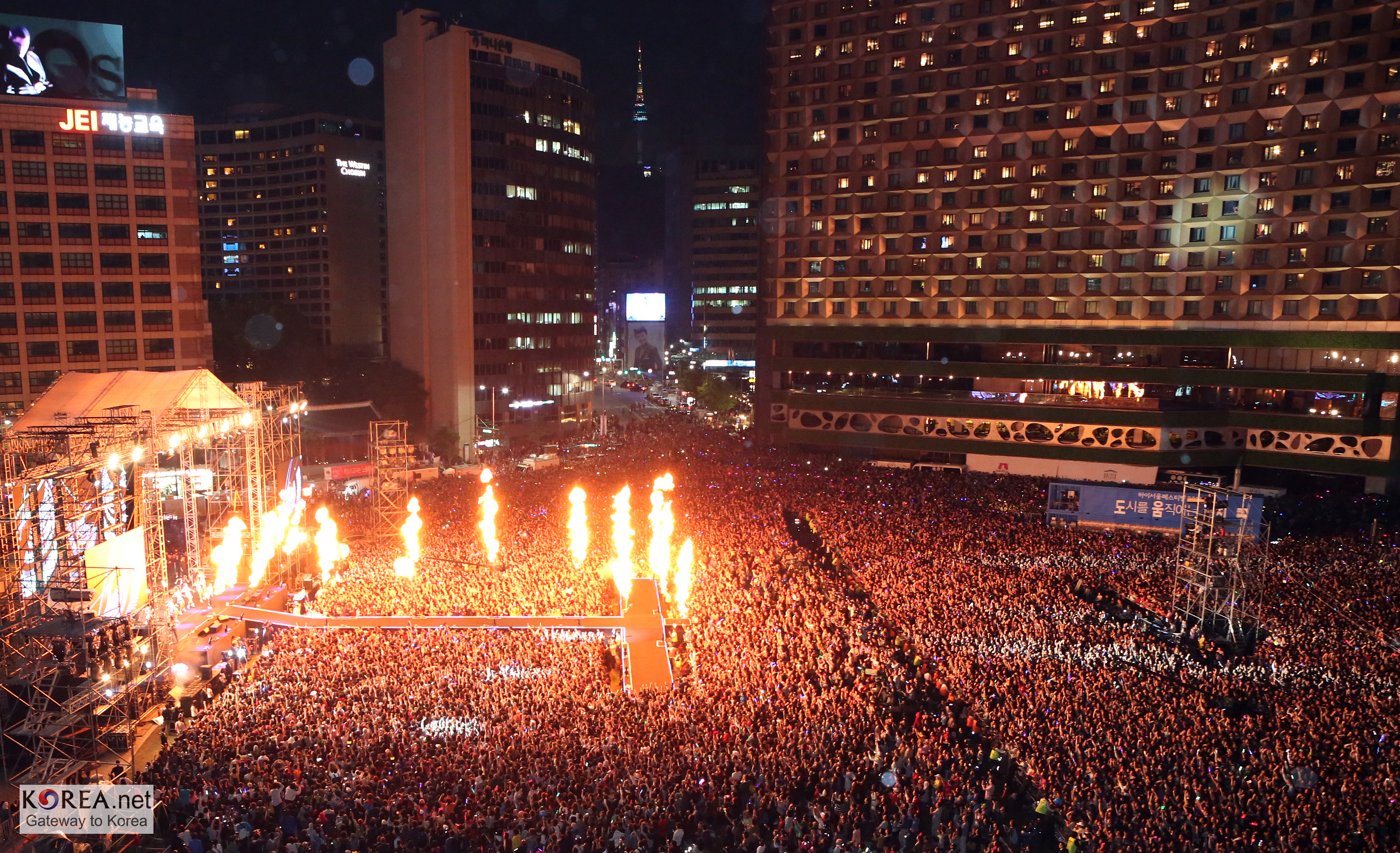
Psy performing at Seoul in 2012

Psy is often considered a proponent in the Korean Wave and is widely credited with transforming global perceptions of Korean pop music and introducing it to international markets. In an interview with Agence France-Presse, Psy affirmed that "[i]t will be only a matter of time before K-Pop will produce many others like Psy".

Psy has been awarded multiple Guinness World Records for:

- "Gangnam Style" – Most viewed video online
- "Gangnam Style" – Most "liked" video online
- "Gangnam Style" – First video to be viewed more than 1 billion times on YouTube
- "Gentleman" – Most viewed video online in 24 hours
- "Gangnam Style" – First video to be viewed more than 2 billion times on YouTube

On May 25, 2017, Psy was presented with a Diamond Play Button from YouTube, in recognition of his surpassing 10 million subscribers to his YouTube channel, making him the first Asian solo artist to ever do so.

== Personal life ==
In 2001, Psy was arrested for smoking and possessing marijuana and was sentenced to 25 days in jail. As a result, he was unable to be at his grandfather's deathbed as he died of cancer, or attend his funeral. During an interview in 2012 Psy stated "I was very close to him. I was not there at the funeral: I will regret this for the rest of my life, because my grandpa loved me so much, and I couldn't be there for him on his deathbed." Psy was also fined in January 2002 for the marijuana incident.

Psy began dating Yoo Hye-yeon, a cello major at Yonsei University, after they were introduced by a mutual acquaintance in April 2003; they married on October 14, 2006. They have twin daughters together. Psy purchased a condominium in the Westwood neighborhood of Los Angeles in November 2012, having relocated after signing with American manager Scooter Braun. In 2022, he returned to South Korea to start his own record label in Gangnam.

According to The Korea Times, Psy earned more than $40 million in 2012, primarily through his hit song "Gangnam Style". His estimated personal income for the year was $28 million under his 7:3 profit-sharing contract with YG Entertainment. In a July 2013 interview with The Sunday Times, he admitted that he has struggled with alcoholism, noting that the only time he is not drinking alcohol is when he is hung over.

== Political views ==
In April 2013, Psy described the conflict between South and North Korea as a tragedy. He also expressed hope that North Koreans would one day be able to enjoy his music and said that his job is to make everyone, including North Koreans, laugh. In an interview with The Daily Beast later that month, he was asked for his opinion on North Korean leader Kim Jong Un's threats against South Korea and the United States, to which he replied, "Well, as an entertainer, I don't want to talk about politics. As a Korean citizen, I want peace. That's all I can say. I want permanent peace." Shortly before the start of a concert in Seoul, he said, "Tonight, me and 50,000 Korean people... we are going to sing out loud. We are going to shout out loud and we are really close to them [the North Koreans] so they can hear."

=== Anti-American performances and apology ===
Throughout his career Psy has expressed his criticism of U.S foreign policy and the U.S military presence in South Korea, aspects which caused him controversy once his music garnered popularity in the United States.

In 2002, Psy participated in the Mnet Music Video Festival performing the song "Killer", a song made by Shin Hae-chul featuring him. At the end, Psy lifted a tank and smashed it front of the stage, in reference to a U.S. military convoy tank that accidentally struck and killed two 14-year-old South Korean schoolgirls in Yangju. The soldiers involved in the incident were acquitted by U.S. military courts, which fueled a significant amount of anti-American sentiment in South Korea.

In 2004, South Korean translator and Christian missionary Kim Sun-il was kidnapped and beheaded in Iraq after the South Korean government refused to reconsider sending its armed forces to support the Iraq War. Although initial protests were only directed towards the South Korean government and towards extremists in Iraq, anti-U.S. military protesters decided to seize the moment to trigger a much larger wave of anti-Americanism. During a concert, Psy admonished the Iraqi kidnappers, condemned South Korea's former president Roh Moo-hyun, and also sang along to lyrics of the song "Dear American" by South Korean rock band N.EX.T, which criticizes the United States military for its actions in the Iraq war and featured Korean vocalists such as Kim Jun-pyo, Prhyme (Jung Joon-hyung), Yohan (Pia's lead vocalist), Heo Jae Hoon (Schizo), Jung wook (Ares) and Ahn Heung-chan (Crash). The song was released in the album called The Return of N.EX.T: 개한민국 released on June 16, 2004. An initial translation of the lyrics was posted in CNN. Some of the lyrics, referring to the guards who tortured Iraqi prisoners, were translated by CNN as follows: "Kill those fucking Yankees who have been torturing Iraqi captives and those who ordered them to torture" and "Kill [the Yankees'] daughters, mothers, daughters-in-law and fathers / Kill them all slowly and painfully."

A few days later The Washington Post raised questions about the accuracy of the translation of the lyrics into English, with journalist Max Fisher of The Washington Post soliciting Korean-Americans and a professional interpreter, asking them for a second opinion on the translation. Fisher reported that the lyrics may have actually slurred the American servicemen rather than calling for their deaths, although he did also go on to opine that, "using a racial slur to accuse Americans of killing Iraqis' family members is still pretty serious". Fisher also states that the word translated "Yankee" in the CNN iReport was underplayed, with one Korean-American describing the slur as a "nearly untranslatable" racist "epithet", perhaps best approximated as "foreign barbarian". Fisher notes that one translator indicates that the slur is meant as "a derogatory term for American", and that others have translated the slur alternately as "Yankee", "big nose", and "despicable Western women and men".

Although Psy's actions did not receive any significant international media coverage at that time, this changed after the media reported about it in early December 2012. On December 7, 2012, Psy issued an apology directed towards members of the U.S. military and to the American people for his "inflammatory and inappropriate" language, and expressed hope that the American public would accept his apology. Despite initial public outrage, White House spokesman Josh Earnest told the media that U.S. President Barack Obama and First Lady Michelle Obama would attend Psy's performance at the Christmas in Washington charity concert as planned. As a result of the controversy, a petition circulated on the website of the White House demanding that he be dropped from the concert, although the petition was deleted later in the day because the White House website claimed that the petition violated the website's terms of participation. Time magazine's Nick Carbone asserted that it is "unlikely that these newly dug-up anecdotes will depose Psy from his king-like level of stardom" although Carbone did go on to write that the atmosphere at the White House concert would be "somewhat subdued".

== Philanthropy ==
On August 11, 2022, Psy donated ₩100 million (US$77,000) to help those affected by the 2022 South Korean floods through the Hope Bridge Korea Disaster Relief Association.

== Discography ==
- Psy from the Psycho World! (2001)
- Ssa2 (2002)
- 3 Mai (2002)
- Ssajib (2006)
- PsyFive (2010)
- Chiljip Psy-da (2015)
- 4X2=8 (2017)
- Psy 9th (2022)

== Filmography ==
=== Film ===
Year	Title	Role	Notes	Ref.
2002	Wet Dreams	Student Teacher Seok-Goo		
2002	Emergency Act 19	Himself		
2016	From Vegas to Macau III	Mr. Wong		

=== Television ===
Year	Title	Role	Notes	Ref.
2001	Beautiful Days	Himself	Cameo (episode 15)	
2012	Dream High 2	Trainer Coach	Cameo (episode 5)	
2012	Superstar K4	Judge		
2012	Saturday Night Live	Himself, Lids/Gangnam Style Sketch	Season 38 Episode 1	
2013	Live! with Kelly and Michael	Himself	Two Shows within Two Weeks	
2016	Heroes of Remix	Mentor		
2021	Loud	Judge for P Nation		
2023	Psy Soaking Show 2022	Himself	Concert film	

=== Music video appearances ===
A list of music videos that feature Psy in a guest or cameo role.

Year	Music video	Artist
2003	"애송이 ("Aesongi", "Novice Baby Boy")"	Lexy
2012	"Ice Cream"	Hyuna
2013	"DJ Play My Song (No, Leave Me Alone)"	Schmoyoho
2020	"나로 바꾸자 Switch to Me (duet with JYP)"	Rain

== See also ==
- List of Billboard Social 50 number-one artists
