= Lee Jung-hyun =

South Korean singer and actress (born 1980)

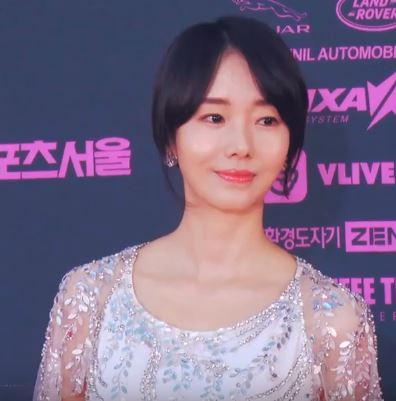
- Lee in 2018
- Born: Lee Jung-hyun; February 7, 1980 (age 46); Yeongdeungpo District, Seoul, South Korea
- Other names: Ava; Hyony
- Education: Chung-ang University
- Occupations: Singer; actress
- Years active: 1996–present
- Spouse: Park Yoo-jung (m. 2019)
- Children: 2
- Musical career
- Genres: K-pop; eurodance; techno; trance; electropop
- Instrument: Vocals
- Label: Pinetree Entertainment
- Website: withava.kr

Korean name
- Hangul: 이정현
- Hanja: 李貞賢
- RR: I Jeonghyeon
- MR: I Chŏnghyŏn

Lee Jung-hyun (Korean: 이정현; Born February 7, 1980), also known by her occasional stage name Ava, is a South Korean singer and actress. She was first recognized for her acting abilities with an award-winning role in her first film and has been solidified as one of the top international acts from South Korea with her illustrious singing career. She has been known as "the Techno Queen" as she introduced the techno music genre to Korea. Lee is also known as "The Queen of Transformation" due to her changing new look for different songs. She is known as one of the first artists who introduced Korean Wave (Hallyu) to China and caused a sensation.

== Career ==
=== As actress ===
Lee Jung-hyun made her acting debut at the age of 16 in A Petal in 1996, which won her 'Best New Actress' at the 34th Grand Bell Awards, 17th Blue Dragon Film Awards and 16th Korean Association of Film Critics Awards. The film tells the story of a girl who experienced the Gwangju uprising at the age of 15, and its effect on her life in later years. Since 1996, Lee has had numerous acting roles with projects in South Korea, Japan and China.

In 2010, Lee regained her acting strides with the Chinese series Confucius, playing the role of Nanzi. In 2011, Lee portrayed a shaman in Park Chan-wook and Park Chan-kyong's award-winning fantasy short film Night Fishing, which was shot entirely on an iPhone. Night Fishing won the Golden Bear for Best Short Film at 2011 Berlin International Film Festival. In 2012, Lee portrayed a single mother in the coming-of-age film Juvenile Offender, which won Best Feature at the Tokyo International Film Festival. She was next cast in the 2014 period blockbuster The Admiral: Roaring Currents, as the sole female character in the main cast. Lee returned to television in the SBS' drama The Family is Coming.

In 2015, Lee starred in black comedy film Alice in Earnestland, which won her 'Best Actress' at the 36th Blue Dragon Film Awards and 3rd Wildflower Film Awards. Lee then starred in the bowling film Split in 2016, and war film The Battleship Island in 2017. In 2019, Lee is scheduled to star in the romantic comedy film Shall We Do It Again.

In 2020, Lee starred in the zombie film Peninsula. The following year, she appeared in Park Chan-wook's mystery film Decision to Leave.

=== As singer ===
After debuting with an award-winning acting performance, Lee started her singing career by introducing the techno genre to the K-Pop scene. With her rapidly-changing styles, Lee assumes a unique persona for each release, such as a mermaid, Barbie doll, tribal queen, soldier, Korean folk dancer, belly dancer, or princess of the sea. She has garnered many nicknames over the years, including "Techno Queen of Korea", "Queen of Performance Art", "Ms. Charisma", "Little Giant", and "Queen of Change".

Before releasing her first solo music she featured as a guest vocalist on the Jo PD single "Fever", also appearing in the music video. She also appeared in the music video for Goofy's "The Rule of the Game".

Her early work is techno-style dance music. Her debut album, Let's Go To My Star, released on October 1999, including her first single, "Wa" (와, "Come") topped the Korean charts for three weeks, while her second, "Bakkweo" (바꿔, "Change"), also from the album, won awards for Best Song and Most Broadcast Song. These two songs were covered by artists throughout Asia and Europe. Many of her earlier songs are sung in an angry mood, from the perspective of a rejected lover. These two singles firmly established Lee as one of the top Korean singers who successfully gained popularity throughout Asia with her strong colorful performances.

Ahead of the 2002 general elections, the singer was asked by political parties if they could use "Change" in their campaigns, to which she declined.

Lee released Japanese versions of her early hits Wa and Heaven in December 2004. The single ranked #26 on Oricon chart in Week 3 of January 2005. Heaven was a theme song for the Korean drama Beautiful Days. The drama became widely popular in Japan. On December 31, 2004, Lee was invited to perform Heaven and Wa-come on- and participate at the 55th edition of Kōhaku Uta Gassen, an annual New Year's Eve live music show. In 2006, she released her first Japanese album, This is Hyony.

Lee was the first foreigner to participate in singing the Beijing Olympic 2008 Theme Song. In 2008, she released her first Mandarin album, Love Me.

With her fifth album, Passion, she switched to a Latin-influenced sound, complete with Spanish Guitar and flamenco-style tap dance.

In May 2009, she released her first Korean mini album Avaholic, featuring a trio of songs, "Crazy," "Vogue It Girl" and "Miro". The music video "Crazy" was choreographed by Brian Friedman. In September 2009, she was invited to open at Lady Gaga's The Fame Ball Tour in Club Answer, Seoul, South Korea. In December 2009, Lee sung her first ballad for the soundtrack of the Korean TV drama Iris. The song, "How Can I Hold Back Tears," takes her to the ballad genre for the first time in her over 10-year singing career.

In 2010, her seventh album, 007th, was released on May 11, 2010, with the title song, "Suspicious Man." In this title single's music video, Lee once again showed her dynamic performance range by introducing a vengeful assassin with a short blonde do. The seventh album was entitled, "007th."

In 2013, she released her single entitled "V", featuring Jin Goo in a music video directed by Park Chan-wook and Park Chan-kyong, with whom she'd previously worked on Night Fishing.

=== Cultural ambassador ===
In August 2007, singer-actress Lee was named a UNESCO Goodwill Ambassador.

On June 22, 2012, Lee was appointed as an honorary ambassador for the Korea-China Cultural Industry Conference, called CICON.

== Personal life ==
=== Marriage and family ===
Lee married orthopedic doctor Park Yoo-jung in a private ceremony in April 2019. During her appearance on Stars' Top Recipe at Fun-Staurant, her husband, whose face was censored for privacy reasons, was dubbed "Baby". His face was eventually revealed on her next appearance on the show in 2023.

On December 7, 2021, Lee announced on her YouTube channel that she was pregnant . On April 23, 2022, Lee's agency confirmed that Lee gave birth to her first daughter, Park Seo-ah, on April 20, 2022.

On June 14, 2024, Lee announced on Stars' Top Recipe at Fun-Staurant that she was pregnant again. Her second daughter, Park Seo-woo, was born on October 30, 2024.

== In music arcade games ==
Lee's music has been featured in rhythm games. "Wa" and "Bakkwo" were included in the Korean dance games "Let's Dance" and "TechnoMotion". These songs were also featured in the Korean releases of Dance Dance Revolution 3rdMix, as well as the Dance Dance Revolution 4thMix games. Also, "Nuh" (Trance Mix) was featured in EZ2Dancer.

Her song "Come On!" is featured in the Pump It Up NX Absolute dance machine, both a short Chinese version and the full song version appearing in it.

Currently, "I'll Give", "Going Crazy" and other songs are featured on Audition, an online dance-rhythm game.

== Discography ==
=== Korean ===
- Let's Go to My Star (1999)
- Lee Jung Hyun II (2000)
- Magic to Go to My Star (2001)
- I Love Natural (2002)
- Passion (2004)
- Fantastic Girl (2006)
- Lee Jung Hyun 007th (2010)

=== Japanese ===
- This is Hyony (2006)

=== Chinese ===
- Love Me (2008)

== Filmography ==
=== Film ===
Year	English title	Original title	Role	Notes/Ref.
1996	A Petal	꽃잎	Girl	
1997	Maria and the Inn	마리아와 여인숙	18-year-old Maria	Guest appearance
1999	Scent of Love	침향	Im Sun-hee	
2000	Harpy	하피	Song Soo-yeon	
2011	Night Fishing	파란만장	Female shaman	Short film
2012	Juvenile Offender	범죄소년	Jang Hyo-seung	
2014	The Admiral: Roaring Currents	명량	Mrs. Jung	
2015	Alice in Earnestland	성실한 나라의 앨리스	Jung Soo-nam	
2016	Split	스플릿	Joo Hee-jin	
2017	The Battleship Island	군함도	Oh Mal-nyeon	
2017	The Running Actress	여배우는 오늘도	Herself	Cameo appearance
2019	Shall We Do It Again	두번할까요	Park Seon-young	
2019	The Night of the Undead	죽지않는 인간들의 밤	So-hee	
2020	Peninsula	반도	Min-jeong	
2022	Decision to Leave	헤어질 결심	Jung-an	
2022	Limit	리미트	So-eun	

=== Television series ===
Year	English title	Original title	Role	Notes/Ref.
1996	Open Your Heart	가슴을 열어라	Yoo Seo-young	
1996	Seven Spoons	일곱개의 숟가락	Jo Jung-hye	
1998	Legendary Ambition	야망의 전설	Lee Jung-hee	
1998	One Day Suddenly	어느날 갑자기	Eun-mi	
2001	Beautiful Days	아름다운 날들	Kim Se-na	
2003	Beautiful Heart	美麗心靈	Cheng Hui	Chinese series
2006	Rondo	輪舞曲	Choi Yoon-hee	Japanese series
2008	The Great King, Sejong	대왕 세종	Yi-seon (later Sinbin Kim)	
2010	Confucius	孔子	Nanzi	Chinese series
2015	The Family is Coming	떴다! 패밀리	Na Joon-hee (Susan Johnson)	
2024	Parasyte: The Grey	기생수: 더 그레이	Choi Jun-kyung	Netflix series

=== Television show ===
Year	Title	Role	Notes	Ref.
2019–2020	Stars' Top Recipe at Fun-Staurant	Cast Member	Episode 8–29	

=== Video games ===
- 2001: Tomak: Save the Earth, a Love Story

== Accolades ==
=== Awards and nominations ===
==== Acting awards ====
Year	Award	Category	Work	Result
1996	17th Blue Dragon Film Awards	Best New Actress	A Petal	Won
1996	34th Grand Bell Awards	Best Actress	A Petal	Nominated
1996	34th Grand Bell Awards	Best New Actress	A Petal	Won
1996	16th Korean Association of Film Critics Awards	Best New Actress	A Petal	Won
1997	Cine21 Film Awards	Best New Actress	A Petal	Won
2013	49th Baeksang Arts Awards	Best Actress (Film)	Juvenile Offender	Nominated
2013	56th Asia-Pacific Film Festival	Best Actress	Juvenile Offender	Nominated
2014	23rd Buil Film Awards	Best Supporting Actress	The Admiral: Roaring Currents	Nominated
2015	51st Baeksang Arts Awards	Best Supporting Actress (Film)	The Admiral: Roaring Currents	Nominated
2015	23rd SBS Drama Awards	Top Excellence Award, Actress in a Drama Special	The Family Is Coming	Nominated
2015	36th Blue Dragon Film Awards	Best Leading Actress	Alice in Earnestland	Won
2015	35th Korean Association of Film Critics Awards	Best Actress	Alice in Earnestland	Nominated
2016	11th Max Movie Awards	Best Actress	Alice in Earnestland	Nominated
2016	7th KOFRA Film Awards	Best Actress	Alice in Earnestland	Nominated
2016	3rd Wildflower Film Awards	Best Actress	Alice in Earnestland	Won
2016	21st Chunsa Film Art Awards	Best Actress	Alice in Earnestland	Nominated
2016	25th Buil Film Awards	Best Actress	Alice in Earnestland	Nominated
2016	52nd Baeksang Arts Awards	Best Actress (Film)	Alice in Earnestland	Nominated
2017	25th Korea Culture & Entertainment Awards	Best Actress	The Battleship Island	Won
2017	6th Korea Film Actors Association Awards	Top Star Award	The Battleship Island	Won
2017	38th Blue Dragon Film Awards	Best Supporting Actress	The Battleship Island	Nominated
2017	1st The Seoul Awards	Best Supporting Actress	The Battleship Island	Won
2018	23rd Chunsa Film Art Awards	Best Supporting Actress	The Battleship Island	Nominated
2018	20th Asian Film Critics Association Awards	Best Supporting Actress	The Battleship Island	Nominated
2022	43rd Blue Dragon Film Awards	Best Supporting Actress	Decision to Leave	Nominated
2025	KBS Entertainment Awards	Top Excellence Award (Reality)	Stars' Top Recipe at Fun-Staurant	Won

==== Music awards ====
Year	Award	Category	Work	Result
1999	8th Seoul Music Awards	Best New Artist	"Come"	Won
1999	14th Golden Disk Awards	Best New Artist	"Come"	Won
1999	KMTV Music Awards	Best New Artist	"Come"	Won
1999	KBS Song Festival	Best New Artist	"Come"	Won
1999	MBC Top 10 Artists Awards	Best New Artist	"Come"	Won
1999	MBC Top 10 Artists Awards	Top 10 Awards	"Come"	Won
1999	SBS Music Awards	New Solo Artist	"Come"	Won
1999	1999 Mnet Asian Music Awards	Best New Solo Artist	"Come"	Won
1999	1999 Mnet Asian Music Awards	Best Dance Performance	"Come"	Won
2000	9th Seoul Music Awards	Bonsang (Main Prize)	"You" & "Peace"	Won
2000	15th Golden Disk Awards	Bonsang (Main Prize)	"You" & "Peace"	Won
2000	KBS Song Festival	Bonsang (Main Prize)	"You" & "Peace"	Won
2000	SBS Music Awards	Top 10 Awards	"You" & "Peace"	Won
2000	KMTV Music Awards	Grand Prize (Daesang)	"You" & "Peace"	Won
2000	KMTV Music Awards	Music Video of the Year	"Peace"	Nominated
2000	2000 Mnet Asian Music Awards	Best New Solo Artist	"Peace"	Nominated
2000	Korea Best Dresser Awards	Best Dressed Female Singer	Herself	Won
2001	10th Seoul Music Awards	Bonsang (Main Prize)	"Going Crazy" & "Half"	Won
2001	KBS Song Festival	Bonsang (Main Prize)	"Going Crazy" & "Half"	Won
2001	16th Golden Disk Awards	Best Female Solo Artist	"Going Crazy" & "Half"	Nominated
2001	SBS Music Awards	Top 10 Awards	"Going Crazy" & "Half"	Won
2001	KMTV Music Awards	Grand Prize (Daesang)	"Going Crazy" & "Half"	Won
2002	10th Korean Culture and Entertainment Awards	New Generation Artist	"Half"	Won
2002	2002 Mnet Asian Music Awards	Best Dance Performance	"Half"	Nominated
2002	17th Golden Disk Awards	Popularity Award	Herself	Won
2002	KMTV Music Awards	Artist of the Year (Main Prize)	"Ari Ari"	Nominated
2002	KBS Song Festival	Bonsang (Main Prize)	"Ari Ari"	Won
2002	SBS Music Awards	Bonsang (Main Prize)	"Ari Ari"	Won
2003	12th Seoul Music Awards	Bonsang (Main Prize)	"Summer Dance"	Nominated
2003	SBS Music Awards	Bonsang (Main Prize)	"Summer Dance"	Nominated
2003	KBS Song Festival	Artist of the Year (Main Prize)	"Summer Dance"	Won
2003	2003 Mnet Asian Music Awards	Best Dance Performance	"Summer Dance"	Nominated
2005	13th Korean Culture and Entertainment Awards	Hallyu All Star Award	Herself	Won
2006	China Fashion Awards	Korean Artist of the Year	Herself	Won
2012	6th Huading Awards	Best International Artist	Herself	Won
2013	2013 Mnet Asian Music Awards	Red Carpet Special Prize	Herself	Won
2015	Korea Culture and Tourism Industry Awards	Hallyu Star Award	Herself	Won

=== Listicles ===
Name of publisher, year listed, name of listicle, and placement
Publisher	Year	Listicle	Placement	Ref.
Korean Film Council	2021	Korean Actors 200 (Note: Introduces 200 actors that best represent the present and future of Korean cinema to the people in the film industry all over the world.)	Included	
