= List of K-pop on the Billboard charts =

Current Billboard logo.

List of K-pop on the Billboard charts is a compilation of chart information for K-pop music published by the Billboard charts, and reported on by Billboard K-Town, an online Billboard column. The charts tabulate the relative weekly popularity of the artists, songs and albums in the United States and globally. This is a list of K-pop musicians and bands and their placement, along with their musical releases, singles, EPs and albums on the Billboard charts.

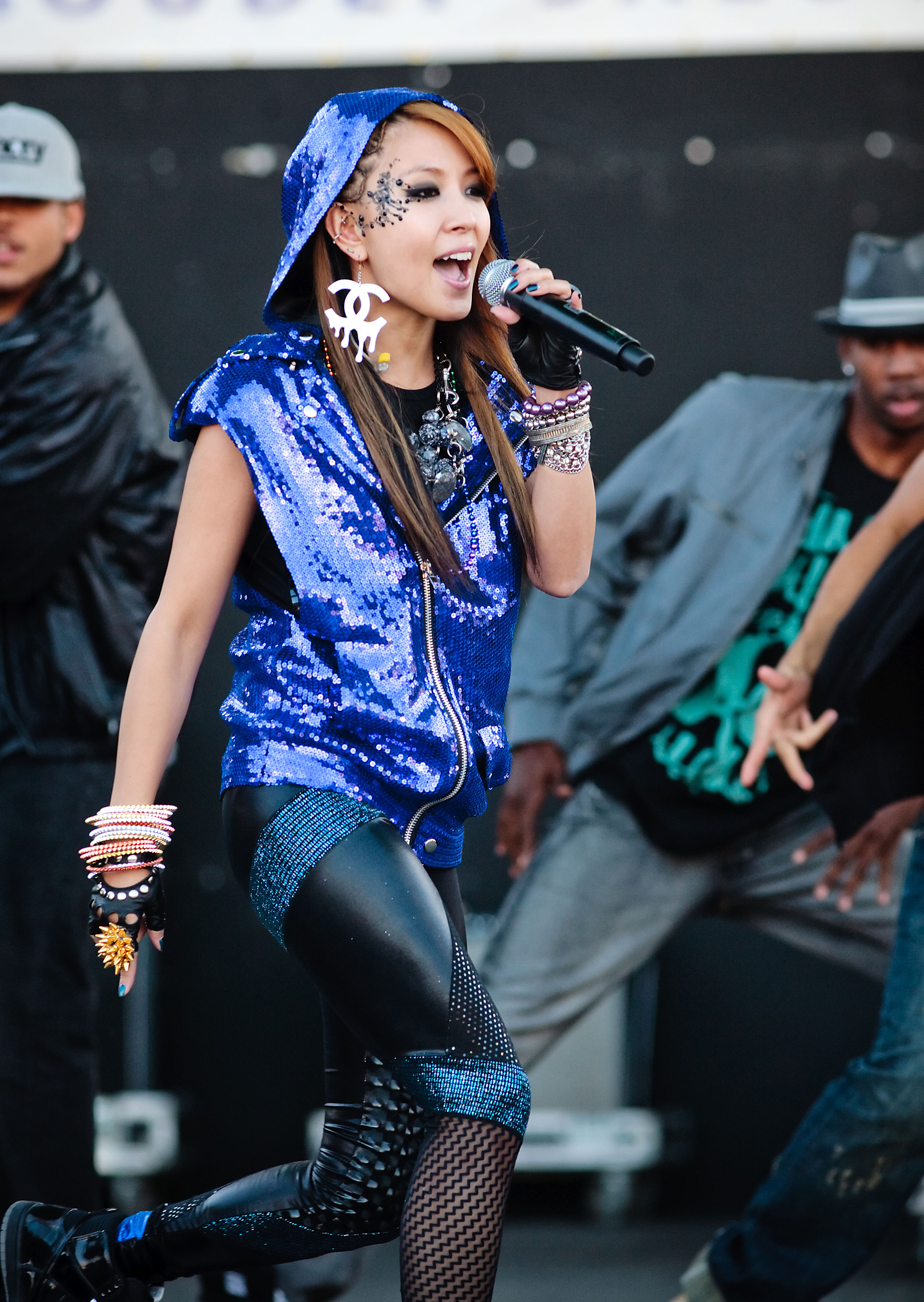
BoA performing at San Francisco Pride, June 28, 2009

== 2009–present ==
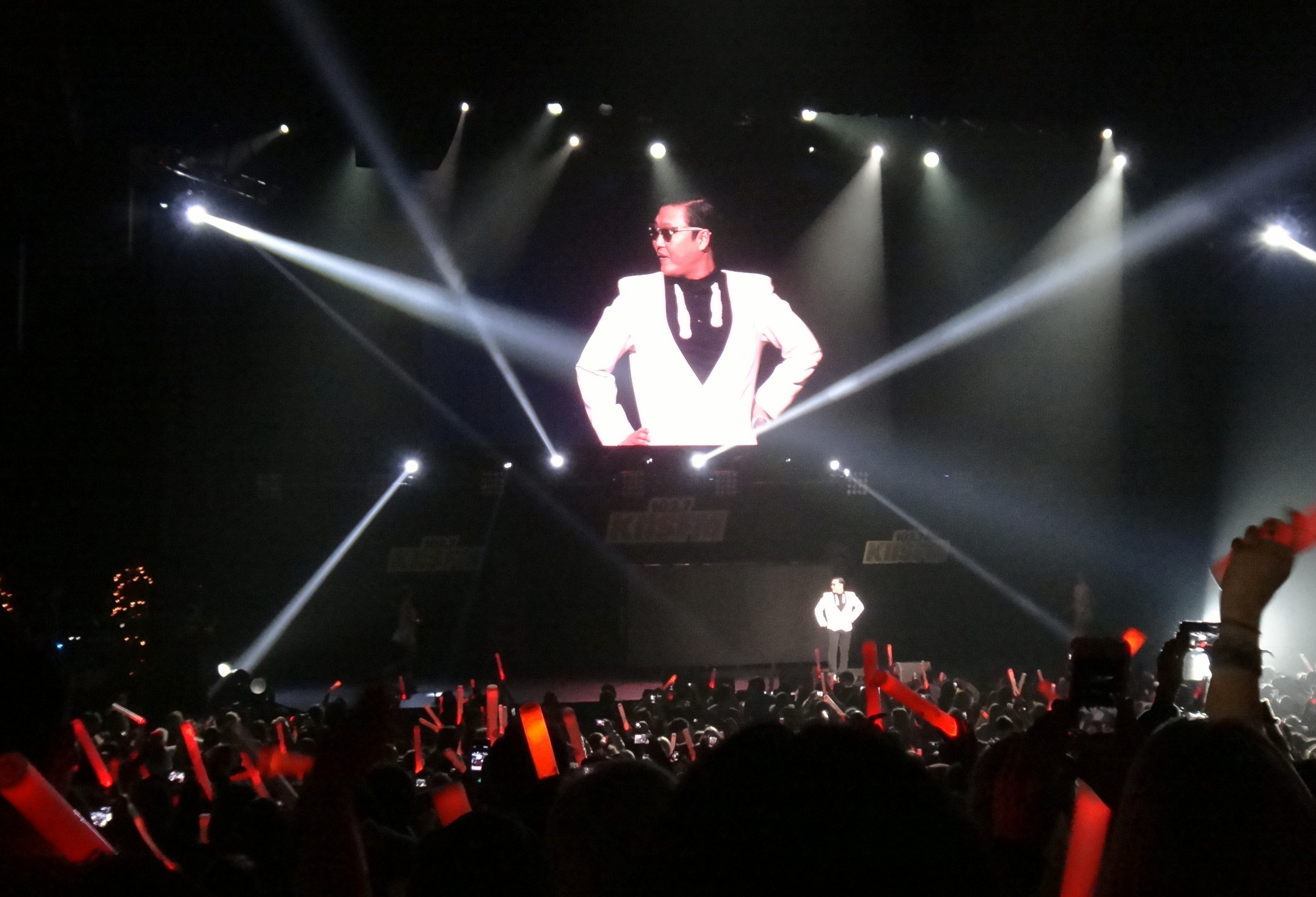
Psy performing Gangnam Style at KIIS-FM Jingle Ball, Los Angeles, December 3, 2012

- This list depends on continual updates taken from *Billboard artist/title/chart search and *Billboard charts.
- Charts with all updates 2009–present are marked (Complete).
- Billboard artists comprehensive update incomplete.
- Billboard charts comprehensive update incomplete.
- The list is currently minus portions of Psy performance on 58 charts.
- The list is exclusive of Korea K-Pop Hot 100 data.
- Figures in red highlight indicate the highest rating received by K-pop artists on that chart.
- – Current week's charting

== Weekly charts ==
=== All other weekly charts ===
==== Artist 100 (Complete) ====
- Chart started 2014-07-19

Chart date	Artist	Peak position	Weeks on chart
2015-12-19	Psy	88	1 (R) 2
2016-04-09	Got7	45	1 (R) 8
2016-10-29	BTS	1 (Total 24 weeks) (Note: Peaked 85th week, 2018-06-02 (1 week), returned to #1 on 2018-09-08 (1 week), 2019-04-27 (2 weeks), 2019-05-25 (1 week), 2020-03-07 (1 week), 2020-09-05 (4 weeks), 2020-10-24 (2 weeks), 2020-12-05 (3 weeks), 2021-03-06 (1 week), 2021-07-24 (3 weeks), 2021-08-28 (1 week), 2022-06-25 (1 week), 2026-04-04 (3 weeks))	315 (R) 348
2018-02-03	Exo	9	18 (R) 47
2018-03-10	J-Hope	3	2 (R) 16
2018-04-14	NCT	3	1 (R) 28
2018-06-30	Blackpink	1 (Total 2 weeks) (Note: Peaked at No. 1 on 2020-10-17 (1 week), returned to No. 1 on 2022-10-01 (1 week))	2 (R) 36
2018-07-14	Seventeen	1 (Note: Peaked at No. 1 on 2023-05-13 (1 week))	1 (R) 58
2018-10-06	Baekhyun	35	1 (R) 2
2018-10-27	NCT 127	2	4 (R) 54
2018-11-03	RM	4	1 (R) 12
2019-03-16	TXT	1 (Total 3 weeks) (Note: (Peaked at No. 1 on 2023-02-11 (1 week), 2024-04-20 (1 week), 2024-11-23 (1 week))	1 (R) 94
2019-03-23	Pinkfong	59	7 (R) 12
2019-04-06	Stray Kids	1 (Total 5 weeks) (Note: Peaked at No. 1 on 2022-04-02 (1 week), returned to No. 1 on 2022-10-22 (1 week), 2023-06-17 (1 week), 2024-08-08 (1 week), 2025-12-06 (1 week))	1 (R) 136
2019-08-10	NCT Dream	21	1 (R) 9
2019-08-24	X1	85	1
2019-09-28	SuperM	1 (Note: 2019-10-19 (2 weeks))	1 (R) 12
2019-11-09	Jackson Wang	13	1 (R) 3
2020-02-29	Monsta X	6	1 (R) 6
2020-06-06	Agust D	3	1 (R) 8
2020-06-13	Twice	1 (Note: (Peaked at No. 1 on 2022-09-10 (1 week))	1 (R) 76
2020-11-07	Loona	97	1
2021-03-27	Rosé	4	1 (R) 37
2021-05-15	Itzy	10	1 (R) 13
2021-05-29	Enhypen	1 (Note: Peaked at No. 1 on 2026-01-31 (1 week))	1 (R) 89
2021-09-25	Ateez	1 (Note: Peaked at No. 1 on 2024-11-30 (1 week))	1 (R) 52
2021-09-25	Lisa	8	1 (R) 5
2021-10-23	Aespa	3	1 (R) 17
2021-11-20	Jin	2	1 (R) 7
2021-12-25	Suga	57 (Note: Charted previously at No. 4 on 2020-06-06 (1 week) as Agust D.)	1
2022-01-08	V	3	1 (R) 11
2022-02-26	Jungkook	2	1 (R) 33
2022-07-09	Nayeon	5	5 (R) 9
2022-11-05	Le Sserafim	5	2 (R) 20
2022-11-05	(G)I-dle	13	1 (R) 8
2023-01-28	Taeyang	63	1
2023-02-11	NewJeans	2	2 (R) 22
2023-04-01	Jimin	1 (Note: Peaked at No. 1 on 2023-04-08 (1 week))	8 (R) 40
2023-04-08	Nmixx	48	1 (R) 4
2023-04-15	Xikers	25	1 (R) 6
2023-04-15	Jisoo	58	1 (R) 2
2023-05-13	Fifty Fifty	52	18
2023-06-24	P1Harmony	7	3 (R) 12
2023-09-02	Jihyo	10	3
2023-09-23	BoyNextDoor	24	1 (R) 7
2023-10-07	The Rose	33	1
2023-10-21	DPR Ian	61	1
2023-10-21	Jennie	11	1 (R) 8
2024-02-17	TWS	88	1
2024-05-11	Illit	37	1 (R) 3
2024-08-17	Red Velvet	44	1
2024-08-17	Riize	76	1 (R) 2
2024-11-16	Babymonster	63	1 (R) 2
2024-11-23	Kep1er	44	1
2025-03-08	G-Dragon	64	1
2025-03-29	Yeji	73	1
2025-04-05	The Boyz	71	1
2025-04-19	Zerobaseone	16	1 (R) 3
2025-05-31	Meovv	69	1
2025-07-12	Ejae	76	1
2025-07-12	Huntrix: Ejae, Audrey Nuna & Rei Ami	2	44
2025-07-12	Audrey Nuna	98	1
2025-07-12	Rei Ami	99	1
2025-07-19	Saja Boys: Andrew Choi, Neckwav, Danny Chung, Kevin Woo & samUIL Lee	15	24 (R) 37
2025-09-27	Cortis	24	2 (R) 4
2025-09-27	Chaeyoung	32	1
2025-10-04	Ive	92	1
2025-10-25	S.Coups X Mingyu	43	1
2025-11-22	Yeonjun	6	2
2026-05-02	Plave	75	1

==== Bandsintown X Billboard Rising Livestream Artists (Complete) ====
- Chart started 2020-07-11
- Chart discontinued after 2021-07-03

Chart date	Artist	Peak position	Weeks on chart
2020-08-08	Monsta X	21	1
2020-09-12	Seventeen	4	1
2021-05-29	Luna	24	1

==== Billboard Twitter Emerging Artists / Emerging Artists (Complete) ====
- Chart started 2014-05-27 and revamped on chart dated 2017-09-02 (without song titles) and renamed Emerging Artists.

Chart date	Artist	Song/album title	Peak position	Weeks on chart
2014-09-20	Infinite	"Last Romeo"	1 (Note: Entered at No. 1 for 1 week)	1
2016-04-02	Fiestar	"Mirror"	2	4 (R) 5
2016-06-25	Fiestar	"Apple Pie"	5	5
2016-08-27	Wonder Girls	"I Feel You"	41	1
2016-09-03	Infinite	"Bad"	31	1
2016-12-17	Dean feat. Gaeko	"D (Half Moon)"	2	28
2016-12-17	Dal Shabet	"Someone Like U"	24	1 (R) 2
2017-02-18	Gallant & Tablo & Eric Nam	"Cave Me In"	1	8
2017-06-03	Dean featuring Syd	"Love"	2	4
2017-06-10	Seventeen	"Don't Wanna Cry"	1	2
2017-06-10	Seventeen	"Crazy in Love"	2	2
2017-06-10	Seventeen	"My I"	5	2 (R) 4
2017-06-10	Seventeen	"Love Letter"	14	2
2017-06-10	Seventeen	"Pretty U"	10	2
2017-06-17	CLC	"Hobgoblin"	5	7
2017-06-17	Seventeen	"Highlight"	11	1
2017-06-17	CLC	"Meow Meow"	14	1 (R) 3
2017-06-17	Seventeen	"Beautiful"	23	1
2017-11-11	Wanna One	—	4	35 (R) 36
2017-11-25	Monsta X	—	9	4 (R) 91
2017-12-02	Red Velvet	—	1 (Note: Peaked at No. 1 on 2024-08-17 (1 week))	2 (R) 35
2018-01-03	RM	—	1 (Note: 2018-11-03 (1 week))	1 (R) 2
2018-03-03	Agust D	—	46	1
2018-03-10	J-Hope	—	1 (Note: 2022-07-16 (1 week))	2 (R) 5
2018-03-31	NCT	—	1 (Total 2 weeks) (Note: 2018-05-05 (1 week), 2020-10-24 (1 week))	7 (R) 49
2018-05-12	NCT 127	—	1 (Note: 2018-12-8 (1 week))	2 (R) 34
2018-05-12	Stray Kids	—	3	1 (R) 49
2018-06-09	Jackson Wang	—	1 (Note: 2019-11-09 (1 week))	1 (R) 8
2018-06-16	BtoB	—	47	1
2018-06-30	Blackpink	—	1	31
2018-07-28	Mamamoo	—	26	1 (R) 5
2018-08-11	iKon	—	31	2
2018-08-18	Baekhyun	—	1 (Note: Peaked at No. 1 on 2025-06-07 (1 week))	2 (R) 35
2018-08-25	(G)I-dle	—	1 (Note: Peaked at No. 1 on 2023-06-03 (1 week))	1 (R) 20
2018-09-01	Loona	—	8	1 (R) 7
2018-09-08	NCT Dream	—	1 (Total 5 weeks) (Note: 2020-05-09 (1 week), 2022-04-09 (1 week), 2023-09-02 (3 weeks))	6 (R) 79
2018-10-13	Pinkfong	—	1 (Note: 2019-03-30 (1 week))	100
2018-11-17	K/DA	—	26	2 (R) 3
2018-11-24	Jennie	—	6	4 (R) 33
2018-12-08	EXID	—	48	1
2019-01-05	Astro	—	22	1 (R) 9
2019-01-05	TVXQ	—	45	1
2019-02-23	Taemin	—	47	1
2019-03-02	NU'EST	—	29	6
2019-03-16	TXT	—	1 (Total 2 weeks) (Note: Entered at No. 1 (1 week), Returned to No. 1 on 2020-11-21 (1 week))	2 (R) 61
2019-03-23	Park Bom	—	48	1
2019-06-08	Ateez	—	1 (Note: Peaked at No. 1 on 2021-09-25 (1 week))	6 (R) 49
2019-06-29	GFriend	—	46	1
2019-06-30	Day6	—	27	1 (R) 3
2019-08-10	Itzy	—	5	2 (R) 14
2019-08-17	X1	—	2	7
2019-09-28	SuperM	—	6	3
2019-12-21	A.C.E	—	50	1
2020-02-29	Iz*One	—	23	3
2019-03-28	V	—	1 (Total 2 weeks) (Note: Peaked at No. 1 on 2022-01-08 (1 week), 2023-08-26 (1 week))	1 (R) 5
2020=05-16	IU	—	1 (Note: Peaked at No. 1 on 2023-04-22 (1 week))	1 (R) 1
2020-06-27	The Boyz	—	3	1 (R) 12
2020-07-04	Seventeen	—	6	5 (R) 17
2020-08-01	Treasure	—	5	5 (R) 18
2020-09-19	Wonho	—	28	1
2020-12-12	Kai	—	48	1
2021-01-02	Enhypen	—	44	1
2021-02-27	Chungha	—	50	1
2021-03-27	Rosé	—	2	3
2021-03-27	DPR Ian	—	2	1 (R) 4
2021-08-07	D.O.	—	48	1
2021-09-25	Lisa	—	3	13 (R) 30
2021-11-20	Jin	—	1 (Note: Peaked at No. 1 on 2022-11-12 (1 week))	1 (R) 7
2021-12-25	Suga	—	1 (Note: Charted previously at No. 46 on 2018-03-03 (1 week) as Agust D.)	2 (R) 4
2022-02-26	Jungkook	—	1	2
2022-04-16	Big Bang	—	24	1
2022-05-07	Jimin	—	11	1 (R) 3
2022-05-07	Ha Sung-woon	—	13	1
2022-06-18	Eric Nam	—	4	1 (R) 2
2022-08-27	NewJeans	—	1 (Note: Peaked at No. 1 on 2023-07-22 (1 week))	5 (R) 27
2022-10-08	Crush	—	1	1
2022-11-26	Xdinary Heroes	—	11	4
2023-02-11	NewJeans	2	2 (R) 14	
2022-10-22	The Rose	—	1 (Note: Peaked at No. 1 on (1 week))	1 (R) 6
2022-12-03	B.I	—	40	1
2022-12-17	Youjeen	—	10	1
2022-12-31	P1Harmony	—	1 (Total 3 weeks) (Note: Peaked at No. 1 on 2023-06-24 (1 week), 2024-02-24 (2 week))	1 (R) 15
2023-03-25	So!YoON!	—	18	1
2023-03-25	Fifty Fifty	—	5	7
2023-04-01	Jimin	—	1	1
2023-04-08	Nmixx	—	1 (Total 2 weeks) (Note: Peaked at No. 1 on 2024-02-17 (1 week), 2025-11-01 (1 week))	4 (R) 21
2023-04-15	Xikers	—	1 (Total 3 weeks) (Note: 2023-04-15 (1 week), 2023-08-19 (1 week), 2024-03-23 (1 week, 2024-09-21 (1 week)))	4 (R) 21
2023-04-15	Jisoo	—	2	1 (R) 9
2023-04-22	Ive	—	1 (Note: Peaked at No. 1 on 2025-10-04 (1 week))	1 (R) 10
2023-09-02	STAYC	—	16	2
2023-09-02	Peggy Gou	—	27	3 (R) 4
2023-09-23	BoyNextDoor	—	1 (Total 4 weeks) (Note: Entered at No. 1 (1 week), peaked again on 2024-09-28 (1 week), 2025-05-31 (1 week), 2025-11-08 (1 week))	7 (R) 58
2023-10-14	Oneus	—	8	1
2024-02-17	TWS	—	2	8 (R) 11
2024-04-13	Illit	—	1 (Total 2 weeks) (Note: Peaked at No. 1 on 2024-11-23 (1 week) and on 2025-07-12 (1 week))	11 (R) 74
2024-06-15	ARTMS	—	11 (R) 12	1
2024-07013	Loco	—	10	2
2024-08-17	Riize	—	1 (Note: Peaked at No. 1 on 2025-07-26 (1 week))	6 (R) 12
2024-12-12	Jaehyun	—	7	4
2024-10-19	Woosung	—	11	1
2024-11-09	82Major	—	24	1
2024-11-16	Babymonster	—	2	3 (R) 8
2024-11-16	Kep1er	—	2	2
2024-11-30	Wendy	—	43	1
2024-12-14	Park Hyo-shin	—	4	1
2025-03-29	Yeji	—	5	2
2025-04-19	Zerobaseone	—	1 (Total 2 weeks) (Note: Entered at No. 1 for 1 week and returned to No. 1 on 2025-09-20 (1 week))	12 (R) 35
2025-05-17	Tablo	—	34	1
2025-05-31	Meovv	—	4	4
2025-07-05	Ejae	—	9	1
2025-07-05	Audrey Nuna	—	11	1
2025-07-05	Huntrix	—	12	1
2025-07-05	Rei Ami	—	13	1
2025-07-05	Andrew Choi	—	7	4
2025-07-05	Saja Boys	—	19	2
2025-07-05	Neckwav	—	20	2
2025-07-05	Danny Chung	—	21	2
2025-07-05	Kevin Woo	—	22	2
2025-07-05	Samuil Lee	—	23	2
2025-07-12	Jinu	—	13	11
2025-07-12	Rumi	—	12	11
2025-07-19	Jeongyeon	—	28	19
2025-07-19	Chaeyoung	—	1 (Note: Peaked at No. 1 on 2025-09-27 (1 week))	22 (R) 23
2025-10-25	S.Coups X Mingyu	—	1	8 (R) 9
2025-12-06	Xlov	—	21	1
2025-12-13	Hwasa	—	18	2
2026-01-31	DK	—	7	2
2026-01-31	Seungkwan	—	8	2
2026-04-11	Yuna	—	23	1
2026-05-02	Plave	—	2	1

==== Billboard Twitter Top Tracks (Complete) ====
- Chart started 2014-05-27 and discontinued after 2017-08-26.
2014 – 2017

Chart date	Artist	Song/album title	Peak position	Weeks on chart
2014-06-21	Psy feat. Snoop Dogg	"Hangover"	1 (Peaked at No. 1 on 2014-06-28 for 1 week)	4
2014-07-12	Girls' Generation	"Mr.Mr."	49	1
2014-08-02	Skrillex and Diplo featuring G-Dragon and CL (*K-pop artist featured on)	"Dirty Vibe"	9	1 (R) 2
2014-09-20	Infinite	"Last Romeo"	33	1
2015-01-17	CNBLUE	"Can't Stop"	43	1
2015-06-27	BTS	"Tomorrow"	8	1
2015-08-01	Super Junior	"Devil"	3	5
2015-08-01	Infinite	"Bad"	4	7 (R) 8
2015-08-01	Apink	"Remember"	13	7
2015-08-01	BTS	"Dope"	16	1 (R) 16
2015-08-22	Wonder Girls	"I Feel You"	11	3
2015-08-22	Apink	"Petal"	50	1
2015-09-12	Girls' Generation	"Lion Heart"	18	4
2015-09-12	Girls' Generation	"You Think"	42	1
2015-10-03	CNBLUE	"Cinderella"	8	3 (R) 4
2015-10-10	Super Junior	"Magic"	34	1
2015-10-17	BTS	"I Need U"	6	1 (R) 17
2015-12-19	Psy feat. CL	"Daddy"	5	4 (R) 6
2016-01-02	BTS	"Dope" (see also Dope 2015-08-01)	16	1 (R) 16
2016-01-09	Apink	"Luv"	24	1
2016-01-16	2PM	"My House"	14	1
2016-01-23	BTS	"Run"	5	12
2016-01-23	BTS	"Butterfly"	2	2 (R) 9
2016-04-02	Baauer feat. M.I.A. and G-Dragon (*K-pop artist featured on)	"Temple"	27	1
2016-06-04	BTS	"Save Me"	3	8 (R) 28
2016-06-04	Tiffany	"I Just Wanna Dance"	8	3
2016-06-11	BTS	"Fire"	3	37 (R) 48
2016-06-25	BTS	"Young Forever"	4	1
2016-06-25	U-KISS	"Stalker"	27	1
2016-10-29	BTS	"Blood Sweat & Tears"	5	4 (R) 5
2016-10-29	BTS	"Lie" (Jimin solo)	4	2 (R) 6
2016-11-26	BTS	"MAMA" (J-Hope solo)	15	3 (R) 6
2016-12-17	Dean feat. Gaeko	"D (Half Moon)"	33	1
2016-12-17	Baek A-yeon feat. JB	"Just Because"	45	1
2016-12-17	Zico feat. Zion.T	"Eureka"	49	1
2016-12-24	Far East Movement feat. Tiffany & King Chain	"Don't Speak"	16	2
2017-02-18	Gallant & Tablo & Eric Nam	"Cave Me In"	42	1
2017-03-04	BTS	"Not Today"	1 (Peaked at No. 1 on 2017-03-11 for 1 week, return to No. 1 on 2017-03-25 for 1 week return to No. 1 on 2017-05-20 for 1 week return to No. 1 on 2017-06-24 for 1 week)	26
2017-03-11	BTS	"Reflection"	39	1
2017-03-25	BTS	"First Love" Suga solo	22	1
2017-04-08	BTS	"Spring Day"	3	16
2017-04-08	CNBLUE	"Between Us"	9	4
2017-04-08	BTS	"Stigma" V solo	26	1 (R) 3
2017-04-15	Twice	"Knock Knock	17	1 (R) 8
2017-04-15	BTS	"Outro: Wings"	34	1
2017-04-22	Got7	"Never Ever"	2	9 (R) 13
2017-04-22	Monsta X	"Beautiful"	4	9 (R) 12
2017-04-22	BtoB	"Movie"	18	1 (R) 3
2017-04-22	GFriend	"Fingertip"	28	2
2017-04-29	BTS	"Two! Three!"	14	1 (R) 4
2017-04-29	Zico	"She's a Baby"	30	1
2017-05-27	Psy	"I Luv It"	11	1
2017-05-27	Psy	"New Face"	19	2
2017-06-03	Twice	"Signal"	4	9
2017-06-10	Seventeen	"Don't Wanna Cry"	8	7
2017-06-10	Seventeen	"Crazy in Love"	25	2
2017-06-17	Sistar	"Lonely"	8	2
2017-06-17	Astro	"Baby"	20	1
2017-06-24	G-Dragon	"Untitled, 2014"	15	5
2017-07-15	Seventeen	"Highlight"	11	1
2017-07-15	Got7	"Paradise"	21	1
2017-07-22	BTS	"Come Back Home"	1 (Entered at No. 1 on 2017-07-22 for 1 week)	6
2017-07-22	Day6	"Hi Hello"	7	2
2017-07-29	Psy feat. Taeyang	"Love"	26	2
2017-07-29	Twice	"Touchdown"	46	1
2017-08-05	NU'EST	"Look (A Starlight Night)"	8	1
2017-08-05	Jay Park feat. Sik-K	"Yacht"	46	1
2017-08-12	Monsta X	"Shine Forever"	28	1
2017-08-12	NCT 127	"Baby Dont Like It"	30	1
2017-08-12	NCT 127	"Cherry Bomb"	35	3
2017-08-19	Girls' Generation	"All Night"	4	2
2017-08-19	Girls' Generation	"Holiday"	5	2
2017-08-19	GFriend	"Love Whisper"	13	2
2017-08-19	Twice	"Cheer Up"	7	2

==== Hot Tours ====
- Ranked by Gross. Compiled from Boxscores reported for weekly periods. Only current week retained on chart.
- Chart has not updated from 2020-04-01 – present

Event date	Report Date	Artist	Venue	City	Gross Sales	Attend/Capacity	Rank
2010-09-04	2010-10-09	SM Town Live '10 World Tour	Staples Center	Los Angeles	$1,101,582	15,015 (15,015)	10
2011-10-23	Unknown	SM Town Live '10 World Tour	Madison Square Garden	New York City	$1,600,000	11,439 (11,439)	Unknown
2012-08-24	Unknown	2NE1	Nokia Theatre L.A. Live	Los Angeles	$653,716	6,680 (6,714)	29
2013-07-05	2013-08-09	TVXQ!	Microsoft Theater	Los Angeles	$304,175	4,161 (5,734)	33
2013-08-20	2013-09-11	Park Jung-min	Teatro Metropólitan	Mexico City	$199,055	2,411 (3,129)	29
2013-11-11	2013-11-18	Infinite	Event Center Arena	San Jose	$278,680	2,342 (3,004)	113
2014-01-22	2014-05-01	B.A.P	Nokia Theatre L.A. Live	Los Angeles	$239,080	2,770 (6,882)	51
2014-01-26	2014-02-16	CNBLUE	Pepsi Center WTC	Mexico City	$500,734	6,057 (6,486)	31
2014-06-09	2014-07-01	MBLAQ	Pepsi Center WTC	Mexico City	$129,245	2,233 (7,371)	79
2014-06-13	2014-07-01	Lee Moon-sae	Nokia Theatre L.A. Live	Los Angeles	$363,075	3,561 (6,882)	38
2014-07-21&22	2014-10-11	ArtRave: The Artpop Ball – Crayon Pop opened for Lady Gaga (For all 12 concert dates see citation)	Staples Center	Los Angeles	$2,444,324	26,923 (26,923)	19
2014-08-28	2014-09-26	Baek Ji-young	Club Nokia	Los Angeles	$99,360	1,126 (1,780)	80
2014-09-25	2014-11-08	Lee Juck	Club Nokia	Los Angeles	$55,199	591 (1,505)	93
2014-10-03	2014-11-23	B1A4	Best Buy Theater	New York City	$115,000	1,219 (2,150)	307
2014-10-05	2014-11-23	B1A4	Rosemont Theatre	Rosemont	$132,760	1,233 (4,402)	285
2014-11-09	2014-11-23	g.o.d.	Prudential Center	Newark	$394,010	5,142 (9,145)	164
2015-08-01&02	2015-10-09	KCON	Staples Center	Los Angeles	$2,055,800	27,793 (27,793)	38
2015-10-03	2015-10-13	Big Bang	Staples Center	Los Angeles	$1,715,587	13,361 (13,535)	10
2016-01-10	2016-04-16	Infinite	Microsoft Theater	Los Angeles	$368,300	3,535 (4,323)	68
2016-01-19	2016-04-16	Infinite	PlayStation Theater	New York City	$151,255	1,670 (2,136)	125
2016-02-21	2016-06-21	Exo	Prudential Center	Newark	$1,418,705	9,919 (9,919)	13
2016-04-08	2016-07-19	AOMG	PlayStation Theater	New York City	$214,005	1,846 (2,150)	39
2016-06-24	2016-11-26	KCON	Prudential Center	Newark	$2,279,825	18,300 (18,300)	30
2016-07-30&31	2016-09-17	KCON	Staples Center	Los Angeles	$2,224,820	26,229 (26,229)	44
2016-11-04	2017-01-28	CL	Microsoft Theater	Los Angeles	$274,910	3,264 (4,002)	43
2016-11-10	2017-02-04	CL	Chicago Theatre	Chicago	$197,586	1,506 (2,461)	30
2017-03-19&20	2017-04-29	BTS	Citibank Hall	São Paulo	$1,207,360	15,327 (15,327)	16
2017-04-25	2017-06-24	Exo	Prudential Center	Newark	$998,411	5,999 (10,967)	41
2017-04-28	2017-06-03	Exo	The Forum	Inglewood	$1,436,158	8,668 (9,739)	8
2017-04-29	2017-09-30	Korea Times Music Festival	Hollywood Bowl	Los Angeles	$1,191,060	12,968 (17,463)	18
2017-05-26	2017-06-10	BTS	Qudos Bank Arena	Sydney	$2,054,650	11,023 (11,424)	4
2017-06-23&24	2017-11-25	KCON	Prudential Center	Newark	$1,470,230	12,642 (20,576)	47
2017-07-11	2017-11-25	G-Dragon	KeyArena	Seattle	$809,157	6,246 (8,610)	123
2017-07-14	2017-11-25	G-Dragon	SAP Center	San Jose	$1,161,815	9,031 (11,441)	76
2017-07-14	2017-11-04	Monsta X	PlayStation Theater	New York City	$226,298	2,124 (2,150)	56
2017-07-16	2017-09-02	G-Dragon	The Forum	Inglewood	$1,354,697	9,928 (10,957)	25
2017-07-19	2017-10-07	G-Dragon	Toyota Center	Houston	$789,233	5,708 (7,796)	29
2017-07-21	2018-01-20	G-Dragon	United Center	Chicago	$944,143	7,035 (10,688)	14
2017-07-25	2018-02-03	G-Dragon	American Airlines Arena	Miami	$562,097	4,481 (12,129)	34
2017-07-27	2017-11-25	G-Dragon	Barclays Center	Brooklyn	$1,380,349	7,920 (9,861)	57
2017-07-30	2017-11-25	G-Dragon	Air Canada Centre	Toronto	$1,078,640	9,525 (9,525)	83
2017-08-08	2017-09-09	G-Dragon	Brisbane Entertainment Centre	Brisbane	$401,154	2,103 (2,351)	103
2017-08-19&20	2017-11-04	KCON	Staples Center	Los Angeles	$2,542,440	23,806 (23,806)	5
2017-09-01	2017-09-23	Taeyang	The Theatre at Madison Square Garden	New York City	$539,949	3,509 (5,322)	74
2017-09-03	2018-02-24	Taeyang	Aragon Ballroom	Chicago	$303,250	1,756 (4,873)	46
2017-09-15	2017-10-28	Kard	State Theatre	Minneapolis	$155,420	1,814 (1,814)	169
2017-09-22&23	2017-10-14	KCON	Qudos Bank Arena	Sydney	$1,587,760	8,481 (15,798)	44
2017-09-30	2017-12-02	G-Dragon	Mercedes-Benz Arena	Berlin	$1,279,070	9,161 (12,322)	9
2018-03-23	2018-04-21	Music Bank World Tour	Movistar Arena	Santiago	$999,510	9,014 (12,974)	28
2018-03-30	2018-04-14	Lee Moon-sae	Microsoft Theater	Los Angeles	$570,730	4,123 (5,644)	42
2018-06-17	2018-08-25	Monsta X	Eventim Apollo	London	$486,814	4,348 (4,465)	22
2018-07-06	2018-08-17	Got7 (Note: Billboard article recapped the Boxscore (Hot Tours) chart dated August 18, 2018, combining multiple dates for the artists Journey and Def Leppard, which reassigned the ranking position for Got7 to No. 9, while the actual ranking was No. 16 for that reporting period.)	The Forum	Inglewood	$1,303,154	9,600 (10,371)	16
2018-10-09&10	2018-10-23	BTS	The O2 Arena	London	$4,943,140	31,475 (32,278)	6
2018-11-11	2018-11-21	Day6	State Theatre	Minneapolis	$289,980	2,060 (2,091)	22
2018-11-24	2018-12-05	B.A.P	Pantages	Minneapolis	$60,330	532 (992)	23
2019-05-04&05	2019-06-14	BTS	Rose Bowl	Pasadena	$16,557,515	113,040 (113,040)	2
2019-05-11&12	2019-06-14	BTS	Soldier Field	Near South Side	$13,345,795	88,156 (88,156)	7
2019-05-18&19	2019-06-14	BTS	MetLife Stadium	East Rutherford	$14,050,410	98,574 (98,574)	4
2019-05-25&26	2019-06-14	BTS	Allianz Parque	São Paulo	$7,712,318	84,728 (84,728)	9
2019-06-01&02	2019-06-14	BTS	Wembley Stadium	London	$13,545,702	114,583 (114,583)	6
2019-06-07&08	2019-06-14	BTS	Stade de France	Saint-Denis	$13,728,598	107,328 (107,328)	5
2019-05-05	2019-06-15	Blackpink	Infinite Energy Center	Duluth	$1,518,063	9,180 (9,339)	21
2019-05-12	2019-06-01	NCT 127	Microsoft Theater	Los Angeles	$835,589	6,534 (6,785)	19
2019-05-21	2019-06-15	Blackpink	Manchester Arena	Manchester	$682,256	5,424 (6,121)	43
2019-05-22	2019-06-15	Blackpink	SSE Arena, Wembley	London	$1,421,480	9,968 (10,074)	23
2019-06-15	2019-07-09	Blackpink	Qudos Bank Arena	Sydney	$1,542,850	14,317 (14,491)	7
2019-07-06&07	2019-07-30	BTS	Yanmar Stadium Nagai	Osaka	$9,832,610	101,554 (101,554)	3
2019-07-13&14	2019-07-30	BTS	Shizuoka Stadium ECOPA	Fukuroi, Shizuoka	$10,486,317	107,153 (107,153)	2
2019-07-03	2019-08-06	Got7	American Airlines Center	Dallas	$431,714	5,974 (7,113)	49
2019-07-17	2019-08-14	Twice	The Forum	Inglewood	$1,388,228	11,827 (11,827)	37
2019-07-23	2019-08-06	Twice	Wintrust Arena	Chicago	$781,922	5,911 (6,045)	34
2019-08-10	2019-09-04	Monsta X	Staples Center	Los Angeles	$1,103,392	9,115 (9,985)	34
2019-10-11	2019-11-16	BTS	King Fahd International Stadium	Riyadh	$4,381,560	31,899 (37,141)	5
2019-10(26-29)	2019-11-16	BTS	Seoul Olympic Stadium	Seoul	$12,109,026	129,268 (129,268)	1
2020-01-17	2020-02-19	Seventeen	Palacio de los Deportes	Mexico City	$768,868	7,233 (7,849)	17
2020-01-18	2020-04-01	Day6	Verti Music Hall	Berlin	$314,034	2,816 (3,446)	45
2020-01-19	2020-02-01	Itzy	State Theatre	Minneapolis	$163,265	1,385 (1,840)	18
2020-01-29	2020-02-11	Stray Kids	Hulu Theater	New York City	$556,734	4,004 (4,825)	19
2020-01-31	2020-02-25	Stray Kids	Fox Theatre	Atlanta	$419,403	3,077 (4,519)	44
2020-02-01	2020-02-25	SuperM	The Forum	Inglewood	$1,079,826	12,487 (12,487)	18
2020-02-16	2020-02-25	Stray Kids	Microsoft Theater	Los Angeles	$710,354	5,294 (6,020)	24
2020-02-28	2020-03-17	SuperM	The O2 Arena	London	$1,200,190	7,599 (7,889)	23

==== Next Big Sound (Complete) ====
- Chart started 2010-12-18
- Chart did not update since 2021-10-02, possibly discontinued

Chart date	Artist	Peak position	Weeks on chart
2010-12-18	Choi Si-won	5	1
2011-01-01	Sungha Jung(*K-pop covers & collaborations)	10	1
2011-01-08	4Minute	5	1
2011-04-30	2PM	1	1
2011-05-21	Super Junior-M	3	1
2011-07-23	Wonder Girls	12	1
2011-07-30	BIGBANG	2	1
2011-08-06	Rain	6	1
2011-08-20	Jay Park	7	1
2011-08-20	2NE1	9	1
2011-09-03	2AM	6	1
2011-10-15	Park Jung-min	5	1
2011-10-29	Lee Sung-yeol	8	1
2011-11-05	U-KISS	5	1
2012-05-26	Jung Min-A (*Indie-folk gayageum player)	1	1
2013-11-02	9MUSES	14	1
2017-09-09	K.A.R.D	1 (Note: 2017-12-16 (2 weeks))	28
2017-11-25	Day6	1 (Note: 2017-12-30 (1 week), 2018-01-13 (1 week))	9
2018-03-31	Stray Kids	4	4
2018-11-24	(G)I-dle	3	1 (R) 7
2018-12-15	Jackson Wang	8	2 (R) 3
2019-02-16	CLC	7	4 (R) 11
2019-06-08	A.C.E	1 (Total 4 weeks) (Note: 2019-11-16 (1 week); 2019-12-21 (2 weeks), 2021-09-11 (1 week))	1 (R) 37
2019-08-17	Monsta X	11	1
2019-10-05	Ateez	3	6
2019-10-05	Dreamcatcher	1 (Note: 2021-02-13 (1 week))	3 (R) 27
2019-10-12	Tiffany Young	2	3 (R) 7
2019-10-26	SF9	2	6
2019-11-09	Victon	4	4 (R) 25
2020-01-04	The Rose	6	1 (R) 3
2020-01-04	Holland	4	1 (R) 3
2020-01-11	Chungha	1 (Note: 2021-03-13 (1 week))	2 (R) 14
2020-01-11	Oneus	6	1 (R) 4
2020-01-18	Cosmic Girls	5	1 (R) 10
2020-02-22	Sunmi	3	1 (R) 10
2020-04-04	Kang Daniel	4	1 (R) 12
2020-04-11	Onewe	1 (Note: 2020-10-10 (1 week), 2021-01-09 (1 week))	1 (R) 13
2020-05-02	Cravity	3	1 (R) 11
2020-05-23	The Boyz	4	3
2020-05-30	DJ Raiden	5	1 (R) 5
2020-06-06	AB6IX	4	4
2020-06-13	DKB	3	1 (R) 8
2020-06-13	Park Ji-hoon	4	1 (R) 11
2020-06-27	Lovelyz	6	1 (R) 7
2020-07-18	Verivery	1 (Note: 2020-11-07 (1 week))	1 (R) 11
2020-08-29	Secret Number	2	1 (R) 9
2020-08-29	Wonho	3	2 (R) 3
2020-08-29	Cherry Bullet	5	4 (R) 5
2020-09-26	Fromis 9	2	2 (R) 15
2020-10-03	KNK	3	2
2020-10-03	UP10TION	9	1 (R) 9
2020-10-10	MCND	1 (Note: Peaked at No. 1 on 2021-09-18 (1 week))	3 (R) 16
2020-10-17	Kang Seung-yoon	4	1
2020-10-17	Mino	11	1 (R) 3
2020-10-24	Momoland	5	1 (R) 2
2020-11-07	AleXa	4	1 (R) 3
2020-11-07	Cravity	13	2
2021-03-06	WEi	2	7 (R) 12
2021-03-06	Bobby	10	1
2021-03-13	Drippin	3	1 (R) 4
2021-04-03	E'Last	8	1
2021-05-22	Golden Child	4	1 (R) 6
2021-06-19	Seori	5	1 (R) 2
2020-06-16	Everglow	9	1 (R) 3
2021-08-21	Somi	1	3
2021-08-28	Mirae	7	3
2021-08-28	HYO	10	1
2021-08-28	Gray	13	1
2021-09-11	Lee Hi	3	1 (R) 3
2021-09-11	STAYC	2	1 (R) 3

==== Social 50 (Complete) ====
- Chart started 2010-12-11.
- Chart discontinued. The chart was halted from 2020-12-26 to present while under revisions and never updated.

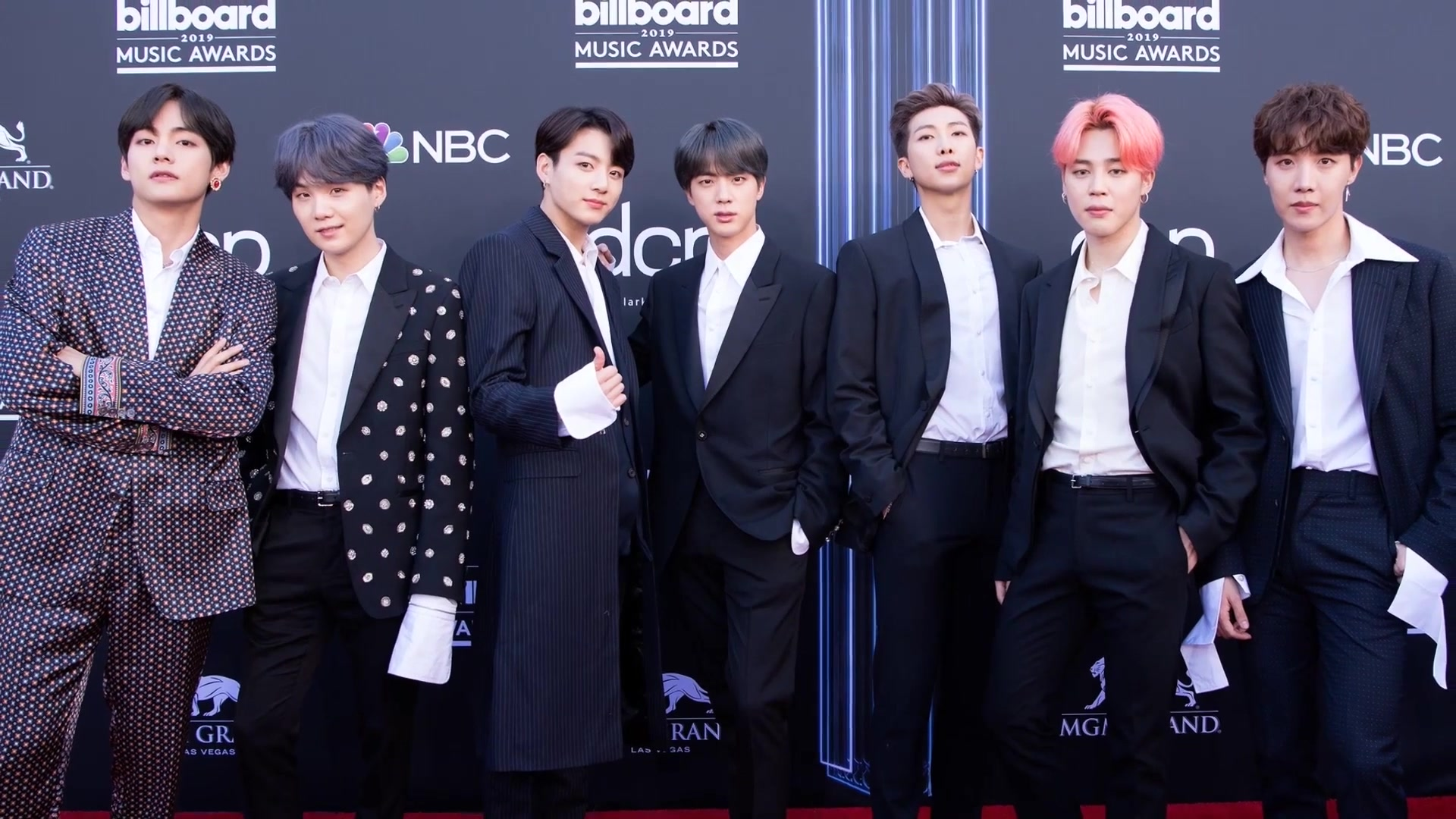
BTS on the 2019 Billboard Music Awards red carpet, May 1, 2019.

Chart date	Artist	Peak position	Weeks on chart
2011-07-09	2PM	35	1
2011-11-26	Wonder Girls	33	2
2012-03-31ast	Sungha Jung (*K-pop covers & collaborations)	33	12 (R) 19
2012-04-21	Big Bang	11	11
2012-08-18	Psy	1 (Note: 2012-09-08 (10 weeks))	1 (R) 56
2015-08-01	Girls' Generation	12	3 (R) 18
2015-08-29	VIXX	14	4 (R) 28
2015-10-17	Got7	2	2 (R) 174
2016-02-13	Ryeowook	38	1
2016-09-03	CL	17	2 (R) 6
2016-10-29	BTS	1 (Total 210 weeks) (Note: (Entered at #1 for 2 weeks, moved to #2 on 2016-11-12 for 2 weeks, returned to #1 on 2016-11-26 for 1 week, moved to #2 on 2016-12-03 for 1 week, returned to #1 on 2016-12-10 for 3 weeks, moved to #2 on 2016-12-31 for 1 week, returned to #1 on 2017-01-07 for 3 weeks, moved to #2 on 2017-01-28 for 1 week, returned to #1 on 2017-02-04 for 8 weeks, moved to #2 on 2017-04-01 for 1 week, returned to #1 on 2017-04-08 for 11 weeks, moved to #2 on 2017-06-24 for 1 week, returned to #1 on 2017-07-01 for 1 week, moved to #2 on 2017-07-08 for 1 week, returned to #1 on 2017-07-15 for 1 week, moved to #2 on 2017-07-22 for 1 week, returned to #1 on 2017-07-29 for 180 weeks))	219
2016-11-19	Blackpink	2	4 (R) 165
2017-01-07	Taeyeon	16	6 (R) 13
2017-02-18	Red Velvet	2	1 (R) 47
2017-05-27	Hyuna	39	1
2017-06-24	Seventeen	2	99 (R) 183
2017-08-12	Exo	2	178
2017-09-02	Taeyang	36	3 (R) 4
2017-09-09	G-Dragon	17	1 (R) 3
2017-10-21	Wanna One	3	14 (R) 57
2017-11-11	Epik High	22	1
2017-11-25	Monsta X	3	12 (R) 159
2017-11-25	Twice	3	1 (R) 128
2018-01-03	Kim Jong-hyun	2	1
2018-01-03	Shinee	4	1 (R) 32
2018-01-13	Seungri	46	1
2018-01-20	JBJ	35	2
2018-02-03	Suzy	17	2
2018-03-31	NCT	2	63 (R) 119
2018-03-31	Stray Kids	2	15 (R) 112
2018-04-14	Astro	7	1 (R) 89
2018-04-14	Yesung	20	9
2018-04-21	Super Junior	15	2 (R) 51
2018-04-21	Pentagon	20	1 (R) 37
2018-05-12	NCT 127	2	3 (R) 118
2018-05-19	Momoland	47	1
2018-06-09	(G)I-DLE	17	1 (R) 17
2018-06-16	BtoB	21	1 (R) 9
2018-06-23	NU'EST	13	10 (R) 38
2018-06-30	Day6	15	1 (R) 21
2018-07-14	Apink	39	2
2018-07-21	Mamamoo	13	4 (R) 40
2018-07-28	GFriend	19	1 (R) 15
2018-08-11	SF9	34	1 (R) 5
2018-08-18	Baekhyun	2	2 (R) 76
2018-08-18	iKon	23	1 (R) 6
2018-08-25	Loona	13	2 (R) 25
2018-08-25	NCT Dream	2	10 (R) 86
2018-10-20	Lay Zhang	7	7 (R) 26
2018-11-17	Jackson Wang	13	1 (R) 40
2018-12-08	EXID	44	1
2019-01-05	TVXQ	29	1 (R) 2
2019-03-16	TXT	2	1 (R) 92
2019-03-16	4Minute	29	3
2019-04-20	Ateez	3	1 (R) 81
2019-04-27	DJ Soda	39	1
2019-04-27	The Boyz	6	1 (R) 59
2019-07-20	Itzy	11	8 (R) 21
2019-08-10	Tiffany Young	24	2 (R) 3
2019-08-17	X1	2	14 (R) 16
2019-08-24	Kang Daniel	29	3 (R) 10
2019-09-07	UP10TION	32	1
2019-09-14	CLC	38	1 (R) 2
2019-09-28	SuperM	2	10 (R) 29
2019-10-05	AB6IX	30	4
2019-10-05	Kard	41	1
2019-10-26	Amber Liu	47	1
2019-11-02	Victon	19	3 (R) 13
2019-11-09	Iz*One	4	2 (R) 20
2019-11-09	Oneus	23	1 (R) 16
2019-11-09	A.C.E	15	1 (R) 15
2020-04-04	Eric Nam	50	1
2020-04-25	Cravity	12	3 (R) 4
2020-05-30	Treasure	3	1 (R) 26
2020-06-20	Cho Seung-youn (WOODZ)	20	6 (R) 7
2020-08-15	Dreamcatcher	40	1

==== Spotify Velocity (Complete) ====
- Chart started 2016-01-23 and discontinued after chart dated 2017-07-22.
2016 – 2017

Chart date	Artist	Song	Peak position	Weeks on chart
2016-07-02	Exo	"Monster"	20	1
2016-09-03	Blackpink	"Whistle"	12	2
2016-09-17	CL	"Lifted"	25	1
2016-09-24	Red Velvet	"Russian Roulette"	16	1
2016-11-05	BTS	"Blood Sweat & Tears"	6	2
2016-11-12	Far East Movement & Marshmello featuring Chanyeol & Tinashe	"Freal Luv"	24	1
2016-11-26	Blackpink	"Playing with Fire"	24	1
2017-01-14	Big Bang	"Fxxk It"	13	2
2017-07-08	NCT 127	"Cherry Bomb"	20	1
2017-07-22	Blackpink	"As If It's Your Last"	22	1

==== Spotify Viral 50 (Complete) ====
- Chart started 2016-01-23 and discontinued after chart dated 2017-07-22.
2016 – 2017

Chart date	Artist	Song	Peak position	Weeks on chart
2016-05-07	NCT U	"The 7th Sense"	35	2
2016-06-04	Tiffany	"I Just Wanna Dance"	49	1
2016-07-30	NCT 127	"Fire Truck"	17	2
2016-09-03	Blackpink	"Whistle"	16	2
2016-09-03	Blackpink	"Boombayah"	36	1
2016-09-10	CL	"Lifted"	30	1
2016-09-24	NCT Dream	"Chewing Gum"	23	2
2016-10-08	Yoo Jae-suk X Exo	"Dancing King"	16	2
2016-11-05	BTS	"Blood Sweat & Tears"	32	1
2016-12-31	Eric Nam & Timbaland	"Body"	43	1
2017-01-07	Chanyeol & Punch	"Stay With Me"	22	2
2017-01-21	Kard feat. Heo Young-ji	"Oh NaNa"	12	1
2017-02-18	Gallant & Tablo & Eric Nam	"Cave Me In"	14	1
2017-03-04	BTS	"Spring Day"	35	2
2017-03-04	BTS	"Not Today"	45	2
2017-03-11	Kard	"Don't Recall"	34	1
2017-04-15	BgA (*K-pop parody group)	"Who's It Gonna Be"	33	1
2017-05-06	Gaeko feat. RM	"Gajah"	48	1
2017-05-13	Minzy feat. Jay Park	"Flashlight"	31	1
2017-05-13	IU	"Ending Scene"	49	1
2017-05-20	Suran feat. Changmo	"Wine"	23	1
2017-05-20	Baekhyun	"Take You Home"	31	1
2017-07-08	NCT 127	"Cherry Bomb"	38	1
2017-07-22	Twice	"Cheer Up"	5	1

==== Uncharted (Complete) ====
- Chart started 2011-01-29 and discontinued after chart dated 2014-06-07.
2011 – 2014

Chart date	Artist	Peak position	Weeks on chart
2011-02-26	Sungha Jung (*K-pop covers & collaborations)	1 (Peaked at #1 on 2012-10-06 for 1 week, on 2013-02-23 for 1 week, on 2013-03-23 for 5 weeks, on 2013-05-04 for 8 weeks)	16 (R) 132
2011-06-04	CNBLUE	49	1
2013-09-07	BtoB	48	1 (R) 3

==== YouTube (Complete) ====
- Chart information starts 2011-08-13. Chart missing information for 2013-10-26, 2013-11-16, 2014-09-06, 2014-12-12, 2015-05-16.
- Discontinued after chart dated 2019-04-06.
2011 – 2019

Chart date	Artist	Song/album title	Peak position	Weeks on chart (# after Re-entry is total)
2011-08-13	2NE1	"Don't Stop the Music"	5	1
2011-08-20	Super Junior	"Mr. Simple"	19	1
2011-11-26	Wonder Girls	"Be My Baby"	12	1
2012-06-23	Big Bang	"Monster"	11	1
2012-06-23	Wonder Girls	"Like This"	22	1
2012-06-30	f(x)	"Electric Shock"	4	2
2012-06-30	Girls' Generation	"Paparazzi"	11	3
2012-07-28	2NE1	"I Love You"	14	1
2012-08-11	Psy	"Gangnam Style"	1 (Peaked at #1 on 2012-09-08 for 7 weeks, on 2013-12-01 for 10 weeks, on 2013-02-16 for 2 weeks, on 2013-04-06 for 3 weeks, on 2013-07-20 for 1 week)	11 (R) 56; 7 (R) 8
2012-09-22	Girls' Generation	"All My Love Is for You"	6	1
2012-09-29	Girls' Generation	"Oh!"	5	2
2012-11-10	Hyuna	"Ice Cream"	2	2
2012-11-10	Psy feat. Hyuna	"Oppa is Gangnam Style"	2	10
2012-11-17	Girls' Generation	"Flower Power"	10	2
2012-11-17	Lee Hi	"1,2,3,4"	24	1
2013-01-12	Girls' Generation	"I Got a Boy"	2	6
2013-04-27	Psy	"Gentleman"	1 (Entered at #1 for 10 weeks)	32 (R) 36
2013-07-27	2NE1	"Falling in Love"	24	1
2013-08-17	Exo	"XOXO (Kisses & Hugs)"	17	1
2013-09-21	G-Dragon feat. Diplo & Baauer	"Coup d'Etat"	10	1
2013-11-23	Girls' Generation	"My Oh My"	13	1
2013-12-07	2NE1	"Missing You"	21	3
2014-06-28	Psy feat. Snoop Dogg	"Hangover"	1 (Entered at #1 for 1 week)	4
2015-04-18	Exo	"Call Me Baby"	22	1
2015-06-20	BigBang	"Bang Bang Bang"	13	2
2015-12-19	Psy feat. CL	"Daddy"	6	3
2016-05-14	Twice	"Cheer Up"	25	1
2016-11-12	Twice	"TT"	7	1
2017-03-04	BTS	"Spring Day"	11	1
2017-03-11	Twice	"Knock Knock"	8	1
2017-03-11	BTS	"Not Today"	10	1
2017-10-07	BTS	"DNA"	4	2
2017-11-25	Twice	"Likey"	8	1
2017-12-16	BTS feat. Desiigner	"MIC Drop" (Steve Aoki remix)	20	1
2017-12-30	Twice	"Heart Shaker"	8	1
2018-03-10	J-Hope	"Daydream"	22	1
2018-03-24	Got7	"Look"	21	1
2018-04-21	Twice	"What Is Love?"	3	1
2018-06-02	BTS	"Fake Love"	2	3
2018-06-30	Blackpink	"Ddu-Du Ddu-Du"	4	7 (R) 13
2018-08-18	Stray Kids	"My Pace"	19	1
2018-09-29	Got7	"Lullaby"	8	1
2018-10-06	Pinkfong	"Baby Shark"	7	1 (R) 22
2018-11-10	Exo	"Tempo"	13	1
2018-11-17	Twice	"Yes or Yes"	2	1
2018-11-17	K/DA feat. (G)I-DLE's Miyeon & Soyeon, Madison Beer & Jaira Burns	"Pop/Stars"	5	3
2018-11-24	Jennie	"Solo"	2	2
2018-12-08	Mino	"Fiancé"	22	1
2018-12-15	Got7	"Miracle"	11	1
2018-12-22	Exo	"Loveshot"	25	1
2019-02-23	Itzy	"Dalla Dalla"	2	1
2019-03-16	TXT	"Crown"	7	1
2019-04-06	Stray Kids	"Miroh"	7	1
2019-04-06	BTS	"Map of the Soul: Persona"	17	1

== Monthly compiled reporting ==
=== Hot Tours of the month ===
- Chart started 2019-03-23. Ranked by Gross. Compiled from Boxscores reported for monthly periods. Chart data available in Billboard print issues only.

Event year/month	Report Date	Artist	# of Shows	Gross Sales	Attend/Capacity	Rank
2019-05	2019-06-27	BTS	8	$51,666,038	384,498 (Unknown)	1
2019-05	2019-06-27	Blackpink	3	$3,621,799	24,572 (Unknown)	29
2019-06	2019-07-25	BTS	4	$27,274,300	221,911 (Unknown)	5

== Decade-end charts ==
=== Decade-end, 2010s Digital Song Sales ===
Chart date	Artist	Song	Peak position
2010s	Psy	Gangnam Style	44

=== Decade-end, 2010s Social 50 ===
Chart date	Artist	Peak position
2010s	BTS	4
2010s	Exo	20
2010s	Got7	28
2010s	Seventeen	39
2010s	Monsta X	43
2010s	Psy	45
2010s	NCT 127	48
2010s	NCT	50

=== Decade-end, 2010s Streaming Songs ===
Chart date	Artist	Song	Peak position
2010s	Psy	Gangnam Style	1

=== Decade-end, 2010s Top Touring Artists ===
Chart date	Artist	Peak position
2010s	BTS	45

== See also ==
- Timeline of K-pop at Billboard
- Timeline of K-pop at Billboard in the 2020s
- Korea K-Pop Hot 100
- Billboard K-Pop Artist 100
- List of K-pop artists
- List of South Korean idol groups
