= Chromosome 9 open reading frame 43 =

Protein found in humans

C9orf43

Identifiers
- Aliases: C9orf43, chromosome 9 open reading frame 43
- External IDs: MGI: 3045314; HomoloGene: 51897; GeneCards: C9orf43; OMA:C9orf43 - orthologs

Gene location (Human)
Chr.	Chromosome 9 (human)
Band	9q32	Start	113,410,054 bp
Band	9q32	End	113,429,690 bp

Gene location (Mouse)
Chr.	Chromosome 4 (mouse)
Band	4|4 B3	Start	62,443,606 bp
Band	4|4 B3	End	62,466,230 bp
RNA expression pattern
Bgee	Human / Mouse (ortholog); Top expressed in: left testis; right testis; gonad; testicle; sperm; right adrenal gland; right adrenal cortex; islet of Langerhans; left adrenal gland; olfactory zone of nasal mucosa / Top expressed in: spermatid; seminiferous tubule; spermatocyte; morula; embryo; embryo; blastocyst; zygote; ventricular zone; genital tubercle; More reference expression data
BioGPS	n/a
Orthologs
Species	Human	Mouse
Entrez	257169	214106
Ensembl	ENSG00000157653	ENSMUSG00000058046
UniProt	Q8TAL5	Q8BHW4
RefSeq (mRNA)	NM_001278629; NM_001278630; NM_152786	NM_177607; NM_001356420; NM_001356421; NM_001356422; NM_001377106
RefSeq (protein)	NP_001265558; NP_001265559; NP_689999	NP_001343349; NP_001343350; NP_001343351; NP_001364035; NP_808275
Location (UCSC)	Chr 9: 113.41 – 113.43 Mb	Chr 4: 62.44 – 62.47 Mb
PubMed search
- Wikidata
View/Edit Human	View/Edit Mouse

Chromosome 9 open reading frame 43 is a protein that in humans is encoded by the C9orf43 gene. The gene is also known as MGC17358 and LOC257169. C9orf43 contains DUF 4647 and a polyglutamine repeat region although protein function is not well understood.

== Gene ==
=== Location ===
C9orf43 is located on the long arm of chromosome 9 at 9q32 and is expressed on the positive strand. The genomic sequence starts at 113,410,054 bp and ends at 113,429,684 bp. The gene neighborhood of C9orf43 contains 5 other genes: HDHD3, ALAD, POLE3, RGS3, and LOC105376222.

=== Promoter ===
The promoter region of C9orf43 predicted by Genomatix ElDorado is 1199 base pairs long and contains a CpG island and part of the 5' UTR. Transcription factor binding sites determined include zinc finger protein GC-Box factors SP1/GC and HOX-PBX complexes associated with development.

=== Expression pattern ===
C9orf43 gene expression is relatively high in humans, 0.7 times the average gene. C9orf43 is expressed in many different tissues during the fetal and adult developmental stages according to NCBI's EST Profile. The highest expression is seen in the testes with lower relative expression in the umbilical cord, cervix, and brain. Expression is also seen in the fetal liver, lung, liver, brain, heart, spinal cord, pancreas, thymus, salivary gland and placenta.

C9orf43 is expressed in health states including cervical tumors, normal tumors, and soft tissue/muscle tumors. C9orf43 is expressed at high levels in sperm cells compared to lower relative expression in teratozoospermia. Greater relative expression of C9orf43 is seen in the hyperplastic enlarged lobular unit of the mammary gland as compared to the normal terminal duct lobular unit. C9orf43 expression varies in megakaryocyte differentiation as seen in peripheral blood CD34 plus cells as compared to CHRF-288-11 cells.

== mRNA ==
=== Variants ===
C9orf43 contains 10 alternatively spliced mRNAs, 8 of which encode good proteins. The mRNA discussed in this entry has accession number NM_001278629.1 and differs from other mRNA variants in truncation of 5' and 3' ends and inclusion or exclusion of the six cassette exons.

=== Transcriptional regulation ===
376 bp of C9orf43 are antisense to spliced gene POLE3, indicating possible regulation of alternate expression. A short open reading frame upstream of the main open reading frame may reduce efficiency of translation. The 3’ untranslated region of C9orf43 contains 3 predicted stem -loop structures with 4 miRNA predicted to bind.

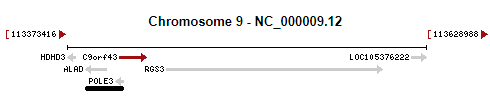
The gene neighborhood of C9orf43 constructed by NCBI Gene. POLE3 antisense expression is shown.

== Protein ==
=== Characteristics and Isoforms ===
C9orf43 has three known complete isoforms and four partial isoforms. Isoform X1 with accession number NP_001265558.1 is the isoform discussed in this entry and contains 461 amino acids and 16 exons. Isoform X1 has a predicted molecular weight of 52.2kD and a predicted isoelectric point of 8.037. Isoform X1 protein abundance is predicted to be normal with normal expression.

C9orf43 is seen to diverge quickly relative to cytochrome c but slowly relative to fibrinopeptides.

=== Structure ===
Composition analysis of C9orf43 showed an above average frequency of Glutamine while all other amino acids were in the normal range for human proteins. DUF4647, a domain of unknown function, is present from amino acid 1-454. Globular domains are predicted from amino acid 193-361 and 375-461. C9orf43 secondary structure is predicted to be 36% alpha helical and 3% beta sheet with 73% disordered. Secondary structure predictions are conserved in orthologous proteins.

=== Homology / Evolution ===
C9orf43 has no known paralogs but has orthologs ranging from mammalian orders to reptile Crocodylus porosus. No orthologs have been found in invertebrate or plant species. C9orf43 divergence is moderate based on the molecular clock hypothesis. C9orf43 is seen to diverge more quickly than cytochrome c but slower than fast evolving fibrinopeptides. A table of orthologous proteins constructed using BLAST contains a small subset of orthologs to exhibit the diversity of C9orf43.

Genus and species	Common name	Taxonomy	Accession number	Date of Divergence	Percent identity
Aotus Nancymaae	Ma's night monkey	Primates	XP_009186498.1	42.6	79%
Pteropus alecto	Black flying fox	Chordata	XP_015448812.1	94	62%
Bos taurus	Cow	Cerartiodactyla	XP_01532817.9	94	57%
Erinaceus europaeus	European Hedgehog	Soricomorpha	XP_007526825.1	94	54%
Phascolarctos cinereus	Koala	Diprotodontia	XP_020821154.1	159	44%
Ursus maritimus	Polar Bear	Carnivora	XP_008706212.1	94	43%
Monodelphis domestica	Gray short-tailed opossum	Didelphimorphia	XP_007475046.1	160	41%
Sarcophilus harisii	Tasmanian Devil	Dasyuromorphia	XP_003757404.3	160	32%
Crocodylus porosis	Saltwater Crocodyle	Reptilia	XP_019396109.1	312	30%

=== Post Translational Modification ===
SUMOylation, O-linked glycosylation, N-acetylgluocose addition, and phosphorylation are predicted post translational modifications of C9orf43.

=== Subcellular Localization ===
C9orf43 is predicted to be intracellular with a nuclear localization signal that is conserved across orthologs. The protein does not contain signal peptides or mitochondrial targeting signals indicating the protein is not predicted to be secreted or targeted to the mitochondria.

=== Interacting Proteins ===
Predicted C9orf43 interaction with OR7D2 and OR4X2 olfactory receptors is likely as olfactory associated zinc finger protein is predicted to bind to the C9orf43 upstream promoter. Predicted interaction of C9orf43 with CATSPER3, a sperm associated voltage gated calcium channel, is also likely as C9orf43 is highly expressed in sperm.

=== Clinical Significance ===
C9orf43 has no known disease associations, however the polyglutamine repeat region is similar to genetic precursors in trinucleotide repeat disorders. An increase in the length of the polyglutamine repeat region is seen in diseases such as Huntington's disease and Spinocerebellar ataxia.
