= 4×2 =

4x2 may refer to:

- A four-wheeled two-wheel-drive vehicle
- 4 inch × 2 inch profile dimensional lumber
- 4 × 200 metres relay, an athletics track event
- 4×2=8, a 2017 album by Psy
- OR4X2, olfactory receptor 4X2, a protein

== See also ==
- 2×4 (disambiguation)
