= Daddy (Psy song) =

Single by Psy featuring CL

from the album Chiljip Psy-da
- Language: Korean; English
- Released: November 30, 2015
- Recorded: December 2014
- Genre: K-pop; EDM; electro house; hip house
- Length: 3:50
- Label: YG; School Boy; Republic
- Songwriters: Park Jae-sang; Teddy; Dominique Regiacorte; Jean-Luc Jacques Michel Drion; William Adams
- Producers: Park Jae-sang; Teddy; Yoo Gun-hyung; Future Bounce Dominique Regiacorte; Jean-Luc Jacques Michel Drion; will.i.am

Psy singles chronology
"Hangover" (2014)	"Daddy" (2015)	"Napal Baji" (2015)

CL singles chronology
"Hello Bitches" (2015)	"Daddy" (2015)	"Lifted" (2016)

Music video
- "Daddy" on YouTube

"Daddy" is a song by South Korean singer Psy featuring CL of 2NE1. It was originally slated for release in 2014; however, the release of the song was pushed back to November 30, 2015, in order to make further improvements. It was made available to digital outlets through YG Entertainment as the lead single of his sixth studio album Chiljip Psy-da (2015). It samples hooks derived from will.i.am's 2007 song "I Got It from My Mama". An accompanying music video for "Daddy" was posted to his YouTube channel in conjunction with the single's release, and became his third music video to surpass 500 million views on the platform in June 2020.

The song was commercially successful in South Korea; it became his third song to reach number one on the Gaon Digital Chart since its establishment in 2010, following "Gangnam Style" (2012) and "Gentleman" (2013). It additionally topped the World Digital Song Sales and entered the charts in six other territories. It was ranked the best-performing song in the country in December 2015, and received the Song of the Year – December award at the 5th Gaon Chart Music Awards. As of September 2016, the song has garnered over 1,100,000 digital downloads.

== History and release ==
"Daddy" was initially slated to be released in August 2014, as a follow-up to his Snoop Dogg collaboration "Hangover". On August 8, Psy reportedly recently began shooting a music video for his upcoming single in Seoul and Busan with director Cho Soo-hyun, who had previously worked with him on the videos for "Gangnam Style" and "Gentleman". Several residents in Busan posted to their social media accounts upon seeing Psy "making monkey-like dance moves for an hour" with an electric sign prop that read "Psy in the sky" with a slew of skyscrapers in the background. After no news regarding its release in August, some fans expected that Psy would unveil his upcoming track at YG's Power World Tour concert in Beijing on October 19, 2014; however, he did not perform any new songs. On December 1, an official from YG Entertainment told media outlets that the release of "Daddy" was not overturned as some had thought, rather Psy would release the single along with a new album when it is in a more "satisfactory state".

In July 2015, Psy's agency announced that new music was to be released "very soon", following a series of delays due to Psy wanting to obtain "a new direction that attracts wider audiences and to find his own style." It was not until November 25 where YG confirmed that Psy's 7th studio-album Chiljip Psy-da, along with its lead single "Daddy", would be released on December 1, 2015 at midnight local time. Both "Daddy" and the album was released at the same time as planned, and the song was made available for digital download and streaming on platforms in several different countries.

== Music video and other usage ==
The music video for "Daddy" was uploaded to Psy's official YouTube channel in conjunction with the release of the single. In the video, Psy debuts a new dance move, which involves flinging his legs and arms in alternate directions. He appears in multiple guises, including a baby, student, dancer, and a balding middle-aged man. Forbes' Mike Fenn highlighted the video for its strange and bizarre imagery, where he wrote it "consists of everything from adults' faces superimposed onto dancing infants to elderly men screaming through town while riding on motor scooters." Within 24 hours of its release, the video received nearly 6 million views on YouTube. The music video surpassed 200 million views in October 2016, and became his third video to surpass 500 million views on the platform in June 2020.

=== In popular culture ===
The song was also featured in the episode "The Unincludeds" in the thirteenth season of American Dad!, which was broadcast on April 11, 2016. In June of the same year, Ubisoft announced that "Daddy" would be one of the 40 new tracks that will be added to the soundtrack of the video game Just Dance 2017. In 2024, the dance move also featured in episode 5 of Japanese anime series Jellyfish Can't Swim in the Night, which was broadcast on May 5, 2024.

== Critical reception ==
"Daddy" received generally mixed reviews from music critics. The Huffington Post said "The mildly disturbing imagery subsides as the main character gets older, but the video doesn't get any less weird," referring to the "creepy shots of Psy's face." Rolling Stone described the single as "another slab of brash synth-heavy K-pop and a video filled with outlandish costume changes and dance moves" and with other adjectives such as "ridiculous" and "silly." Jess Denham from The Independent called it dreadful and the dancing terrible, with bizarrely catchy lyrics "about owing your body to your dad". Mike Fenn of Forbes felt that the song seemed to garner less attention than the video, rather people tune in to see the video's "bizarre imagery" instead of the song itself. On a less critical note, Newsweek's Dipo Faloyin wrote that "To suggest the video has a specific theme would be to limit the unique world in which Psy's genius exists."

== Commercial performance ==
In South Korea, "Daddy" debuted at number one on the Gaon Digital Chart in the chart issue dated November 29 – December 5, 2015, selling 296,737 digital units and was the week's best-selling song. The following week, "Daddy" fell one place to number 2 on the digital chart, and sold an additional 133,257 digital downloads. The song was the top-selling and second most-streamed song in December, accumulating 580,551 units in digital downloads in addition to receiving 22,247,939 streams. As of September 2016, the song has garnered 1,109,395 units in digital downloads in the country.

In the United States, "Daddy" peaked at number 97 on the Billboard Hot 100, becoming his fourth single to enter the chart and the fifth K-pop song to do so overall. It sold 4,000 digital downloads in the country and received 3 million streams in its first week of release. On the US Dance/Electronic Songs chart, the song debuted at number six, making it Psy's fourth top-ten entry. It was ranked the fifth best-selling international song on the 2016 year-end issue of the US World Digital Song Sales chart. In Canada, the song peaked at number 36 on the Billboard Canadian Hot 100. The song additionally peaked at number 20 in Finland and number 103 in Australia.

== Accolades ==
"Daddy" won 6 music program awards, achieving a triple crown (or three wins) on the music programs Inkigayo and M Countdown. Due to its success on digital platforms, "Daddy" received the Song of the Year – December award at the 5th Gaon Chart Music Awards on February 17, 2016.

Music program awards
Program	Date	Ref.
Inkigayo	December 13, 2015	
Inkigayo	December 20, 2015	
Inkigayo	December 27, 2015	
M Countdown	December 17, 2015	
M Countdown	December 24, 2015	
M Countdown	January 7, 2016	

== Charts ==
=== Weekly charts ===
Chart (2015)	Peak position
Australia (ARIA)	103
Belgium (Ultratip Bubbling Under Flanders)	68
Canada Hot 100 (Billboard)	36
Czech Republic Singles Digital (ČNS IFPI)	66
Finland (Suomen virallinen lista)	20
South Korea (Gaon)	1
Sweden Heatseeker (Sverigetopplistan)	7
US Billboard Hot 100	97
US Hot Dance/Electronic Songs (Billboard)	6
US World Digital Song Sales (Billboard)	1

=== Year-end charts ===
Chart (2016)	Position
US Hot Dance/Electronic Songs (Billboard)	36
US World Digital Song Sales (Billboard)	5

== Release history ==
Release dates and formats
Region	Date	Format	Label	Ref.
Various	December 1, 2015	Digital download	YG Entertainment	
