= 2×4 =

2×4 or two by four may refer to:

== Music ==
- 2/4, a time signature in music
- 2×4 (Guadalcanal Diary album), 1987
- 2×4 (Einstürzende Neubauten album), 1984
- 2×4 (Malachi Favors and Tatsu Aoki album), 1999
- Two by Four, 1989 album by Marc Johnson
- "2 X 4", a 1996 song by Metallica from their album Load
- "2×4", a 1995 song by Blind Melon from their album Soup
- "2×4", a 1984 song by The Fall from their album The Wonderful and Frightening World Of...
- "2×4", a 1988 song by The U-Men from their album Step on a Bug

== Other uses ==
- 2by4 or 2x4, a 1998 American drama film
- 2 inch × 4 inch profile dimensional lumber
- 2×4 Roller Derby, a women's roller derby league in Argentina
- Jonny 2×4, a character on the cartoon Ed, Edd n Eddy

== See also ==
- 4x2 (disambiguation)
