= Hangover (Psy song) =

2014 single by PSY featuring Snoop Dogg

Single by Psy featuring Snoop Dogg
- Released: June 8, 2014
- Recorded: 2014
- Genre: EDM; hip-hop
- Length: 3:55
- Label: YG; School Boy; Republic
- Songwriters: Park Jae-sang; Calvin Broadus; Yoo Keon Hyung
- Producer: Yoo Gun-hyung

Psy singles chronology
"Gentleman" (2013)	"Hangover" (2014)	"Daddy" (2015)

Snoop Dogg singles chronology
"Wiggle" (2014)	"Hangover" (2014)	"You and Your Friends" (2014)

Music video
- "Hangover" on YouTube

"Hangover" is a single by South Korean singer Psy featuring American rapper Snoop Dogg. Produced by Yoo Gun-hyung, Its music video debuted on the June 8, 2014, broadcast of Jimmy Kimmel Live!. The song serves as a follow-up to Psy's two international hit singles "Gangnam Style" and "Gentleman". The song was used in the 2018 Marvel superhero film Black Panther during the Busan casino scene.

== Production ==
In January 2014, YG Entertainment confirmed that Psy's upcoming music video would include the American rapper Snoop Dogg along with K-pop rapper G-Dragon. On March 12, 2014, it was revealed that CL of 2NE1 would also appear in the video.

According to YG Entertainment, the music video was produced in January 2014 during Snoop Dogg's visit to South Korea. In an interview with CNN, Psy revealed that the video was filmed over the course of 18 hours at 10 different locations near Incheon International Airport. The music video shows Psy and Snoop experiencing various aspects of Korean nightlife and drinking culture.

== Reception ==
=== Critical response ===
Time magazine described the music video as "delightful", while Spin magazine compared the music to "cacophonous EDM-rap" that is "unlikely to ease a hangover", but the end result is "still a curiously enjoyable five minutes".

=== Social media ===
Immediately after its release, reactions on social media were mixed. The Wall Street Journal noted that some viewers were "soaking it up", while others have voiced their "complaints about both the song and the video". In South Korea, some fans described the music video as a wrong depiction of Korean culture. Within 24 hours of release, the music video for "Hangover" racked up over 10 million views.

== Charts ==
=== Weekly charts ===
Chart (2014)	Peak position
Belgium (Ultratip Bubbling Under Wallonia)	48
Czech Republic Singles Digital (ČNS IFPI)	83
France (SNEP)	171
US Billboard Hot 100	26
US Hot Rap Songs (Billboard)	3
US Hot Dance/Electronic Songs (Billboard)	4

=== Year-end charts ===
Chart (2014)	Position
US Hot Dance/Electronic Songs (Billboard)	33
