= I Luv It (Psy song) =

Single by Psy

from the album 4×2=8
- Released: May 10, 2017
- Genre: Eurodance; K-pop
- Length: 3:08
- Label: YG; School Boy; Republic
- Songwriters: Psy; Zico
- Producer: Zico

Psy singles chronology
"Napal Baji" (2015)	"I Luv It" (2017)	"Love" (2017)

Music video
- "I Luv It" on YouTube

"I Luv It" is a song by South Korean singer Psy. It was released on May 10, 2017 via YG Entertainment, as the lead single from the musician's eighth studio album, 4×2=8. It was co-written by South Korean rapper Zico from Block B.

== Background ==
The track was first revealed in a track list teaser of the album released on May 3, 2017. Writers and composers of the song were also revealed, alongside the second track from the album, "New Face".

Illustrated covers of tracks number 1 to 5 from the album, including "I Luv It", "New Face", "Last Scene", "Love" and "Bomb", were revealed by Psy on May 8, 2017. South Korean actor Lee Byung-hun can be seen sitting beside Psy.

== Music video ==
The music video for the track was released on May 10, 2017, alongside the music video for "New Face". It featured South Korean actor Lee Byung-hun, as well as Japanese comedian Daimaou Kosaka, who wore the same costume in the music video for "PPAP".

In a press conference, Psy said "Pikotaro (Daimaou Kosaka) thanked me through YG Entertainment Japan branch. He said that his music video was influenced by me. After that, I asked him 'Do you want to be in my music video?'"

== Chart performance ==
The song topped the "Billboard + Twitter Trending 140" chart after its release, "New Face" also occupied the second place.

== Accolades ==
Music program wins
Program	Date
M Countdown (Mnet)	May 18, 2017
Inkigayo (SBS)	May 21, 2017

== Charts ==
Chart (2017)	Peak position
South Korea (Gaon)	1
US Hot Dance/Electronic Songs (Billboard)	29
