= Psy 6 (Six Rules), Part 1 =

EP by Psy
- Released: July 15, 2012
- Recorded: 2011–2012
- Length: 22:37
- Language: Korean; English
- Label: YG; KMP Holdings; Universal Music Group; YGEX
- Producer: Psy; Yoo Gun-hyung

Psy chronology
PsyFive (2010)	Psy 6 (Six Rules), Part 1 (2012)	Chiljip Psy-da (2015)

Singles from Psy 6 (Six Rules), Part 1
- 1. "Gangnam Style" Released: July 15, 2012

Psy 6 (Six Rules), Part 1 (Korean: 싸이 6甲 Part 1; RR: Ssai Yukgap Part 1) (Note: The title of the album is a reference to the korean word yukgap that originally means sexagenary cycle, but is also used in a traditional korean swear word in the form of "a mentally disabled person tries to remember the yukgap(병신이 육갑한다)".) is the first extended play by South Korean pop singer Psy, though it is treated as his sixth major album release due to the cancellation of its second installment. It was released on July 15, 2012, the same day "Gangnam Style" was released as the lead single. The EP has sold 106,594 copies in South Korea.

Psy 6 (Six Rules), Part 1 was released in a tin that had a fishbowl-like appearance. Inside the tin is a card that contains the album artwork, cards which contain artwork and lyrics for each of the songs (the artwork for "Gangnam Style" was different from the Germany-released single's art), a card for the credits, two cards of advertising from YG Entertainment and the CD. The whole ensemble is packaged in a white box printed with information.

== Samples and covers ==
The track "Year of 77" samples Switch's "I Call Your Name" (featuring Bobby DeBarge) from their album Switch II (1979). This sample contains vocals from that song. He also translated a part of the lyrics from "La Di Da Di" by Slick Rick feat. Doug E. Fresh to use here. South Korean recording artist Roy Kim covered "Blue/Tree Frog" on the eleventh episode of Mnet's talent competition series Superstar K4, where he was crowned the final winner of the show.

== Cancellation of sequel ==
In 2015, Psy addressed the lack of the follow-up for Psy 6 (Six Rules), Part 1, stated it was skipped because he wanted to move on from the popularity of "Gangnam Style" and start anew with the lucky number seven. He was also looking to release a studio album rather than EP, saying he "hasn't released that many" in his 15-year career.

== Track listing ==
CD and digital download
No.	Title	Lyrics	Music	Length
1.	"Blue/Tree Frog" (청개구리; Cheong-gaeguri, featuring G-Dragon of Big Bang)	Psy; G-Dragon	Psy; Yoo Gun-hyung	3:27
2.	"Passionate Goodbye" (뜨거운 안녕; Tteugeoun Annyeong, featuring Sung Si-kyung)	Psy; You Hee-yeol	You Hee-yeol; Kim Tae-hoon	3:28
3.	"Gangnam Style" (강남 스타일; Gangnam Seutail)	Psy	Psy; Yoo Gun-hyung	3:44
4.	"Year of 77" (77학개론; Chilchilhakgaeron, featuring Leessang and Kim Jin-pyo)	Psy; Kim Jin-pyo; Gary	Psy; Yoo Gun-hyung	4:39
5.	"What Would Have Been?" (어땠을까; Eottaesseulkka, featuring Lena Park)	Psy	Psy; Yoo Gun-hyung	4:03
6.	"Never Say Goodbye" (featuring Yoon Do-hyun)	Psy	Psy; Yoo Gun-hyung	3:21
Total length:				22:37

Notes

- Track 2 is a remake of the song under the same title, which was originally performed by South Korean one-man project band Toy, from their sixth studio album Thank You released in 2007.
- The title of track 4 literally means "Seventy-Seven 101".

== Chart performance ==
=== Weekly charts ===
Chart (2012)	Peak position
Japanese Albums (Oricon)^{[A]}	92
South Korean Albums (Gaon)	1
US World Albums (Billboard)	2

=== Monthly charts ===
Chart (July 2012)	Peak position
South Korean Albums (Gaon)	5

=== Year-end charts ===
Chart (2012)	Position
South Korean Albums (Gaon)	15

- Sales come from the South Korean imported version.

== Sales ==
Chart	Sales
South Korea (Gaon)	129,688
Japan (Oricon)	10,534

== Other songs charted ==
Song	Peak chart position	
Song	Gaon	KOR Hot
"Passionate Goodbye"	4	6
"What Would Have Been?"	9	7
"Blue/Tree Frog"	9	17
"Year of 77"	10	13
"Never Say Goodbye"	14	29
