= OR7D2 =

Protein-coding gene in the species Homo sapiens

Identifiers
- Aliases: OR7D2, HTPCRH03, OR19-10, OR19-4, olfactory receptor family 7 subfamily D member 2
- External IDs: GeneCards: OR7D2

Gene location (Human)
Chr.	Chromosome 19 (human)
Band	19p13.2	Start	9,178,979 bp
Band	19p13.2	End	9,188,818 bp
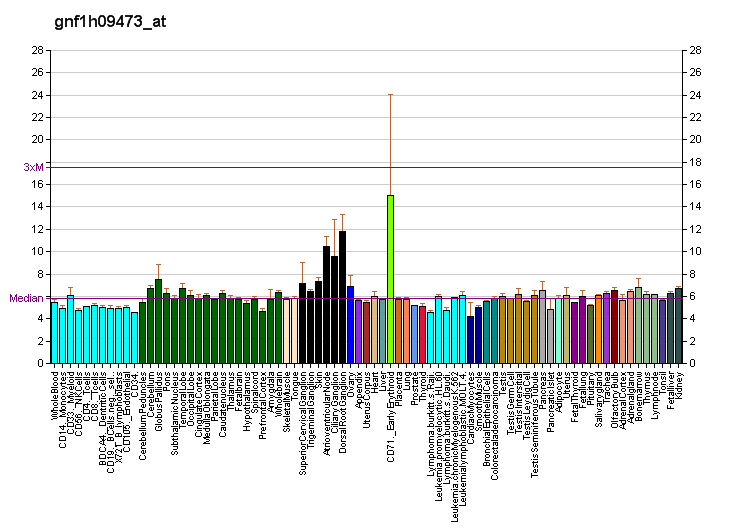
RNA expression pattern
Bgee	Human / Mouse (ortholog); Top expressed in: testicle; skin of hip; gonad; mucosa of transverse colon; ganglionic eminence; lower lobe of lung; ventricular zone; right testis; gastrocnemius muscle; left testis / n/a; More reference expression data
BioGPS	More reference expression data
Gene ontology
Molecular function	G protein-coupled receptor activity; olfactory receptor activity; signal transducer activity
Cellular component	integral component of membrane; plasma membrane; membrane
Biological process	sensory perception of smell; detection of chemical stimulus involved in sensory perception of smell; regulation of transcription, DNA-templated; signal transduction; response to stimulus; G protein-coupled receptor signaling pathway
Sources:Amigo / QuickGO
Orthologs
Databases	NCBI: entry; OMA: entry
Species	Human	Mouse
Entrez	162998	n/a
Ensembl	ENSG00000188000	n/a
UniProt	Q96RA2	n/a
RefSeq (mRNA)	NM_175883; NM_001386112	n/a
RefSeq (protein)	NP_787079	n/a
Location (UCSC)	Chr 19: 9.18 – 9.19 Mb	n/a
PubMed search		n/a
- Wikidata
View/Edit Human

Olfactory receptor 7D2 is a protein that in humans is encoded by the OR7D2 gene.

Olfactory receptors interact with odorant molecules in the nose, to initiate a neuronal response that triggers the perception of a smell. The olfactory receptor proteins are members of a large family of G-protein-coupled receptors (GPCR) arising from single coding-exon genes. Olfactory receptors share a 7-transmembrane domain structure with many neurotransmitter and hormone receptors and are responsible for the recognition and G protein-mediated transduction of odorant signals. The olfactory receptor gene family is the largest in the genome. The nomenclature assigned to the olfactory receptor genes and proteins for this organism is independent of other organisms.

== See also ==
- Olfactory receptor
