= 4×2=8 =

Studio album by Psy
- Released: May 10, 2017
- Recorded: 2016–2017
- Genre: K-pop
- Length: 35:32
- Labels: YG; School Boy; Republic
- Producers: PSY; Yoo Gun-hyung; Seo Won-jin; Kim Dohoon; J.Y. Park "The Asiansoul"; B.I

Psy chronology
Chiljip Psy-da (2015)	4×2=8 (2017)	Psy 9th (2022)

Singles from 4×2=8
- 1. "I Luv It" Released: May 10, 2017; 2. "New Face" Released: May 10, 2017; 3. "Love" Released: July 16, 2017

4×2=8 is the eighth studio album by South Korean singer Psy. The album was released digitally on May 10, 2017, by YG Entertainment, School Boy Records, and Republic Records. The title of the album is a Korean pun; the mathematical formula can be read in Korean as 'sa yi pal' (사이팔), which means '4 times 2 is 8,' the wordplay referring to the fact that this is Psy's 8th album.

This was Psy's last album under YG before his departure on May 15, 2018.

== Background ==
On May 1, YG Entertainment officially announced PSY's comeback by unveiling a poster of the comeback schedule, along with the title of the album 4×2=8. From May 4 to May 7, the track list was released, revealing the title track and featured artists, including Big Bang's G-Dragon and Taeyang, iKON's B.I and Bobby, Zico, Tablo, Lee Sung-kyung and Park Jin-young as a producer. One day before the release of the album, illustration teaser images were unveiled for each song.

== Songs ==
Most of the songs were written and composed by YG Entertainment artists, unlike his last album Chiljip Psy-da which didn't feature any YG artists. Psy stated in an interview that he wanted young blood for the album, and didn't want it to sound old, so he worked with B.I, who co-composed three tracks on the album. BigBang's Taeyang is featured on "Love"; iKon's B.I and Bobby on "Bomb"; and actress Lee Sung-kyung is featured on "Last Scene". Tablo participated in writing the lyrics and is featured on "Auto Reverse" with B.I. BigBang's G-Dragon took part in writing the lyrics for, and features on "Fact Assault", which is notable for having profanity, Psy stated "this track has so much profanity, and I don't even expect it to pass the censorship rating".

== Music videos ==
Actor Lee Byung-hun is featured in the music video of "I Luv It", while Apink's Son Na-eun played the title role in the music video of "New Face". The music videos cumulatively reached 8 million views within 14 hours, with "I Luv It" surpassing 4 million views and "New Face" surpassing 3.7 million views.

On January 1, 2018 "New Face" surpassed 100 million views.

== Promotion ==
PSY performed the songs in his new album for the first time on SBS's Inkigayo on May 14 and Fantastic Duo 2. He also promoted on JTBC's Knowing Bros sho and MBC's Radio Star show.

== Track listing ==
No.	Title	Lyrics	Music	Arrangement	Length
1.	"I Luv It (Note: Samples Bon Bon Vie (Gimme the Good Life) by the American band T. S. Monk.)" (featuring Zico)	Psy, Zico	Psy, Zico, Yoo Gun-hyung, Pop Time	Yoo Gun-hyung	3:09
2.	"New Face (Note: Interpolates "We Want Some Pussy" by the American hip hop group 2 Live Crew from their album The 2 Live Crew Is What We Are.)"	Psy	Psy, Yoo Gun-hyung	Yoo Gun-hyung	3:10
3.	"Last Scene" (마지막 장면; Majimag Jangmyeon featuring Lee Sung-kyung)	Psy, B.I	Psy, Kim Dohoon	Yoo Gun-hyung, Kim Dohoon	4:11
4.	"Love" (featuring Taeyang)	Psy, Yoo Gun-hyung	Psy, Yoo Gun-hyung	Yoo Gun-hyung	3:39
5.	"Bomb" (featuring B.I and Bobby)	J.Y. Park "The Asiansoul", PSY, B.I, Bobby	J.Y. Park "The Asiansoul", PSY, Yoo Gun-hyung, B.I, Bobby	J.Y. Park "The Asiansoul", Yoo Gun-hyung	2:53
6.	"We Are Young" (featuring Kush)	Psy, Kush	Psy, Kush, Seo Won-jin	Seo Won-jin	4:01
7.	"Fact Assault" (팩트폭행; Paegteupoghaeng featuring G-Dragon)	Psy, G-Dragon	Psy, Yoo Gun-hyung	Yoo Gun-hyung	2:58
8.	"Rock Will Never Die"	Psy, Yoo Gun-hyung	Psy, Yoo Gun-hyung	Yoo Gun-hyung	3:03
9.	"Place to Lean On / Refuge" (기댈곳; Gidaelgot)	Psy	Psy, Kush, Seo Won-jin, Baek Gyeongjin	Seo Won-jin	4:34
10.	"Auto Reverse" (오토리버스; Otoribeoseu featuring Tablo (Note: Samples Leejungok(이정옥)'s "the sound of the wind that cries hiding" (숨어우는 바람소리).))	Psy, Tablo, B.I	Psy, Yoo Gun-hyung	Yoo Gun-hyung	3:48
Total length:					35:32

== Release history ==
Country	Date	Label	Format	Ref.
Worldwide	May 10, 2017	YG Entertainment, School Boy, Republic	Digital download	
South Korea	May 15, 2017	YG Entertainment; Genie Music	CD; Digital Download	

== Awards ==
Award	Category	Nominated work	Result
Mnet Asian Music Awards	Song of the Year	"New Face"	Nominated
