= Jung Mina =

Jung Mina 정민아
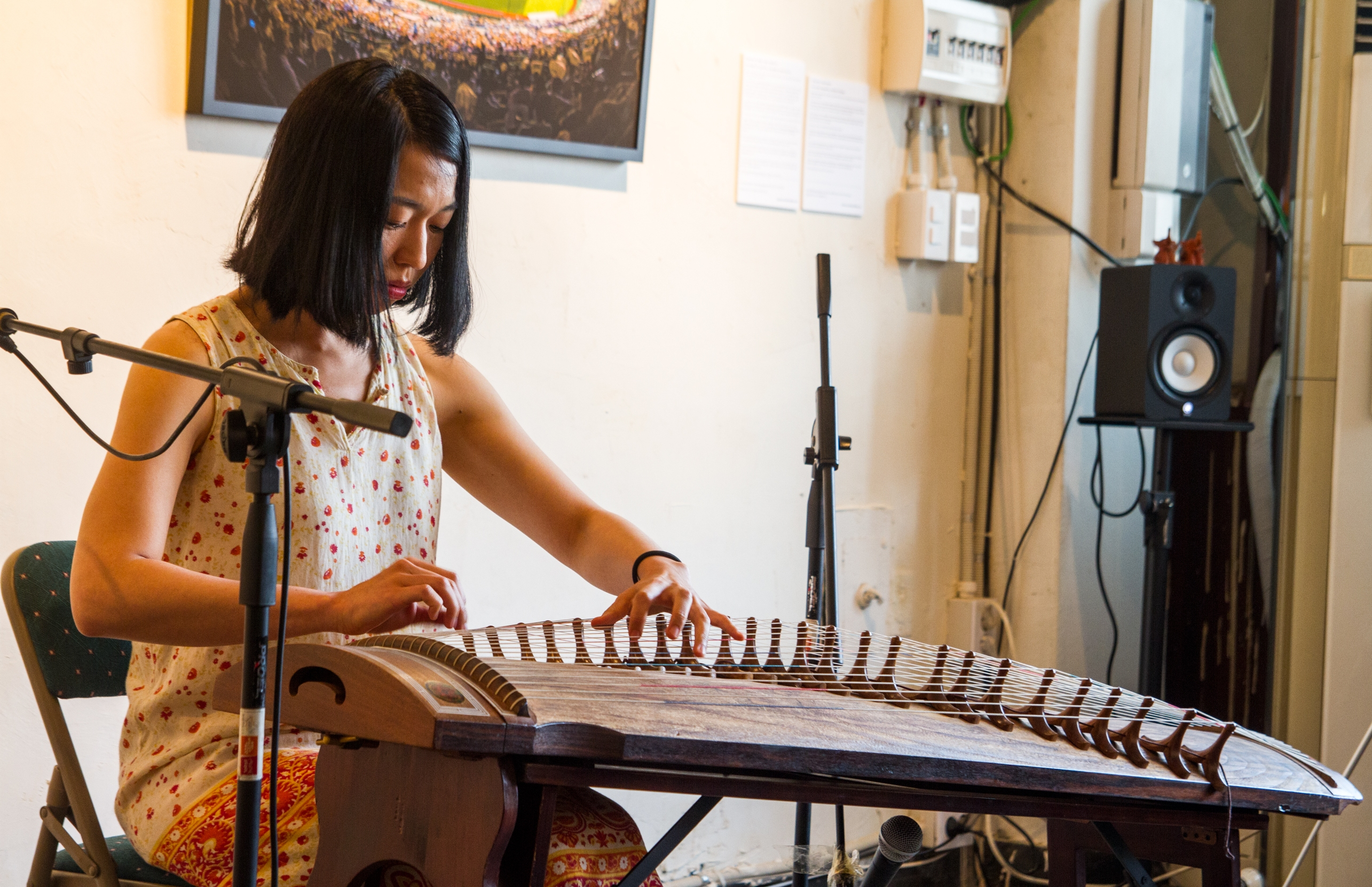
- Jung performing at an art gallery in July 2013

Background information
- Born: January 31, 1979 (age 47); Seoul, South Korea
- Occupations: Gayageum player; singer-songwriter
- Years active: 2005–present

Korean name
- Hangul: 정민아
- RR: Jeong Mina
- MR: Chŏng Mina

Jung Mina (born January 31, 1979) is a South Korean musician, known as the first gayageum singer-songwriter. She sings contemporary music and uses non-traditional techniques in her gayageum playing.

== Early life and career ==
Jung started learning to play the gayageum, a traditional Korean string instrument, at 12 years old. She said it became a big part of her life, so she continued to play it as she developed her music career. She found the instrument when she started taking traditional Korean dance in elementary school. From her second year in middle school she started lessons with a neighborhood teacher, then studied at Gukak National High School, Hanyang University, and Sookmyung Women's University.

She worked various part-time jobs during school and after starting her musical career, including in the ticket office of a racecourse on the weekends for four years, and at a call center, like many of her friends. She said making a living with music was difficult. During a leave from graduate school, a club owner in Hongdae, where she was working part-time, convinced her to start composing and performing on stage. Even after releasing her first album, she returned to part-time work, selling rice balls near Gwanghwamun Station, but soon gave up, admitting that she was not skilled at the work. One of her ballads, "Jumeokbab", or "Rice Balls" was about her work experience. She said, "If I didn't have these experiences, I wonder whether I could have written the music I did, because the only thing I knew was traditional Korean music. I think I would be making only shallow and superficial music." She has said she differs from many musicians, in choosing to write her lyrics first, and the melodies afterwards.

She worked in Hongdae for five years, becoming popular as a fusion indie musician, known as the first with a gayageum to perform there on a regular basis. She uses a 25-string variant of the original 12-string gayageum, to give variations in the range of notes, and incorporates her Western music theory and jazz training in her compositions.

== Debut and albums ==
In 2005, she debuted with her first extended play (EP), Tragedy. In 2006, she released her first studio album, Love Dream, which sold over 10,000 copies. One of the tracks on the album was included in a middle school music textbook. Her second studio album, Afterimage, was released in March 2010. It was described as "[forging] contemporary sounds that successfully blend traditional instrument's sounds with bass guitar rhythms." She released her fourth, A Person's Moment, in January 2014. She wrote the lead track "Poor Woman" for the album after browsing through random books in a Seoul library. This led to her traveling across the country for more inspiration, visiting more libraries, and sleeping in jjimjilbangs to meet the people of the different regions.

== Film documentary ==
A documentary was made of her and her band on a 15-day busking tour in 2009, titled Fantastic Journey of The Modern Gayagumer. It was released on August 18, 2011, after screening at the Jecheon International Music & Film Festival earlier in August.

== Awards and nominations ==
In 2012, as an artist, she charted in the number one position on the Billboard chart "Next Big Sound", a weekly chart of the "fastest accelerating artists during the past week, across all major social music sites, statistically predicted to achieve future success."

| Year | Award | Category | Nominated work | Result | Ref. |
|---|---|---|---|---|---|
| 2008 | Korean Music Awards | Newcomer Award | | Nominated | |
| 2011 | Korean Music Awards | Best Jazz & Crossover Album | Afterimage | Nominated | |
| 2015 | Korean Music Awards | Best Crossover Album | A Person's Moment | Nominated | |

== Discography ==
=== EPs ===
- Tragedy (2005)

=== Studio albums ===
- Love Dream (2006)
- Afterimage (2010)
- Oasis (2011)
- A Person's Moment (2014)
