= Chiljip Psy-da =

Studio album by Psy
- Released: December 1, 2015
- Recorded: 2015
- Genre: K-pop
- Length: 32:57
- Label: YG; School Boy; Republic

Psy chronology
Psy 6 (Six Rules), Part 1 (2012)	Chiljip Psy-da (2015)	4×2=8 (2017)

Singles from Chiljip Psy-da
- 1. "Daddy" Released: November 30, 2015; 2. "Napal Baji" Released: November 30, 2015

Chiljip Psy-da (Korean: 칠집싸이다; RR: Chiljip Ssaida) is the sixth studio album and seventh major release by South Korean singer Psy. The album was released on December 1, 2015, by KT Music, YG Entertainment, School Boy, and Republic. The lead singles included "Daddy" and "Napal Baji".

== Background ==
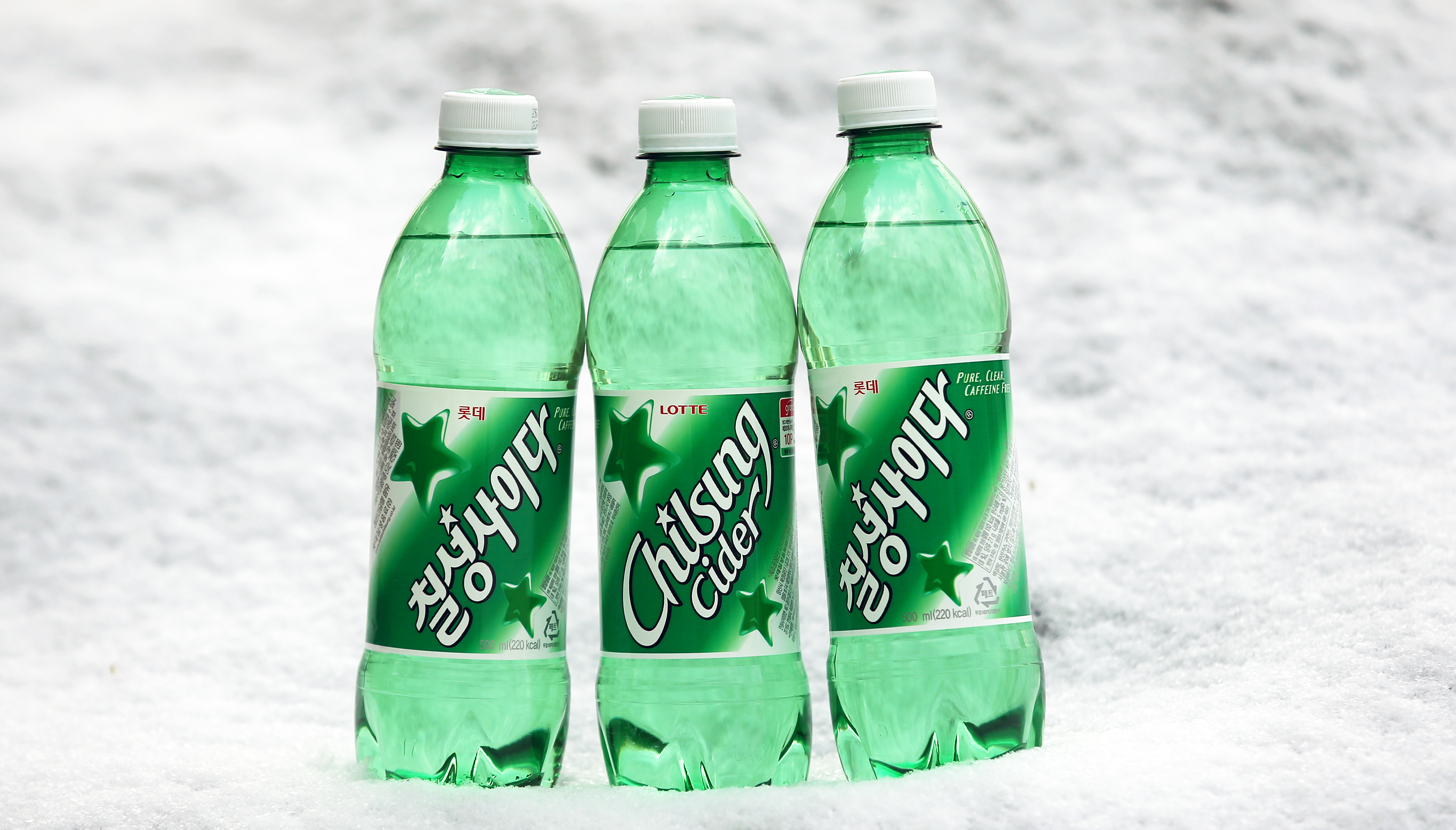
The album cover artwork mimics the design of the Chilsung Cider soft drink.

Psy originally released the title of the album during a streaming on V Live on November 24, 2015. The title and album cover is a parody of a Korean soft drink Chilsung Cider by Lotte Chilsung.

== Songs and composition ==
In the press conference, Psy stated that the single "Napal Baji" is a "fresh sounding retro style funk track with heavy drums and rhythmic guitar lines of the 70s and 80s". Regarding the two singles, he explained that "Daddy" was produced with the international market in mind, while "Napal Baji" was produced mainly for the interest of the domestic market.

Several songs on the album were described by Psy as parallels to several of his older works, including "Dance Jockey" with his 2003 hit "Champion" and "I Remember You" with his 2012 track "What Would Have Been?". Regarding the song "Dream", Psy said that he called Kim Jun-su because he was inspired from his performances. A tribute to the late Korean singer Shin Hae-chul, the lyrics are based on "talks with him about philosophy and death while drinking with him" which he wondered if "maybe all our entire lives are a dream". The profits from the song were donated to his family.

== Track listing ==
CD and digital download
No.	Title	Lyrics	Music	Arrangement	Length
1.	"Dance Jockey" (댄스쟈키)	Psy	Psy; Yoo Gun-hyung	Yoo	3:22
2.	"I Remember You" (featuring Zion.T)	Psy; Tablo	Psy; Yoo	Yoo	3:43
3.	"Napal Baji" (나팔바지)	Psy	Psy; Yoo	Yoo	3:43
4.	"Daddy (Note: The song contains elements from will.iam song "I Got It from My Mama".)" (featuring CL)	Psy; Teddy Park; Dominique Regiacorte; Jean-Luc Jacques Michel Drion; William Adams	Park; Psy; Yoo; Future Bounce; Regiacorte; Drion; Adams	Yoo; Future Bounce	3:50
5.	"Dream" (featuring Xia)	Psy; Shin Hae-chul	Psy; Yoo	Yoo	3:16
6.	"ROCKnROLLbaby" (featuring will.i.am)	Psy; Adams	Psy; Kush; Adams; Yoo	Kush; Yoo; R.Tee	4:16
7.	"The Day Will Come" (좋은날이 올거야; Joheunnari Olgeoya) (featuring Jeon In-kwon)	Psy	Psy; Yoo	Yoo	3:32
8.	"Ahjussi Swag" (아저씨SWAG) (featuring Gaeko)	Psy; Gaeko	Psy; Yoo	Yoo	3:09
9.	"Sing (Psy mix)" (with Ed Sheeran)	Ed Sheeran; Pharrell Williams; Psy	Sheeran; Williams; Psy; Yoo	Yoo	3:57
Total length:					32:57

== Charts ==
Chart (2015)	Peak position
South Korean Albums (Gaon)	6
US World Albums (Billboard)	6
