= Gentleman (Psy song) =

2013 single by Psy

Single by Psy
- Released: April 12, 2013
- Genre: K-pop; hip house
- Length: 3:14
- Label: YG; School Boy; Republic
- Songwriters: Park Jae-sang; Yoo Gun-hyung
- Producer: Yoo Gun-hyung

Psy singles chronology
"Gangnam Style" (2012)	"Gentleman" (2013)	"Hangover" (2014)

Music video
- "Gentleman" on YouTube

"Gentleman" is a K-pop song by South Korean singer Psy released on April 12, 2013 (KST), serving as his 19th single. The song serves as the follow-up to his international hit single "Gangnam Style", which at the time of "Gentleman"'s release had been viewed on YouTube over 1.5 billion times. The first public performance of the song, with its associated dance, was unveiled at 6:30 pm on April 13 at Seoul World Cup Stadium in Seoul. A poster and Twitter message was released containing the main line of the song "I'm a mother f••••• gentleman"; the obscured word was later revealed to be "father". In 2013, Psy stated that he had no plans to release an album including the song or a sequel to it.

As of May 1, 2021, the video has been viewed more than 1.4 billion times. It held the YouTube record for most views in its first 24 hours, and for fastest music video to reach 100 million views for over six years until 2019's "Kill This Love" by fellow YG Entertainment girl group Blackpink. Other records previously held were the fastest overall video to reach 200 million views (until September 2017), and 300 million views (until November 2015). The song reached number one on charts in Luxembourg and South Korea, and peaked at number five on the US Billboard Hot 100, marking his second top-ten single on the chart.

== History ==
In March 2013, South Korean media reported that the title of Psy's upcoming single would contain the word "Assarabia", a slang used by South Koreans to mean "Oh Yeah!", express thrills, or simply to describe something satisfying. There were numerous objections to that upcoming title, and worries have risen that people of Arabic descent might misinterpret the title and find it derogatory.

After being questioned by a correspondent of the Voice of America about the upcoming track's potential to offend, Psy said that there has been some misunderstanding and his upcoming song will undergo a major revamp. On March 19, 2013, he revised his song's title and lyrics over "worries it could offend Arabs".

For the April 13 debut of the dance, Psy instructed fans to attend in white attire. 50,000 people attended the April 13 World Cup Stadium performance. The 6:30 pm Seoul time/ 2:30 am U.S. ET performance was broadcast live on YouTube.

Although his previous song's associated widely imitated horse-riding dance had brought him notoriety, the "Harlem Shake" had recently challenged Psy and "Gangnam Style" for the top position in pop culture. Psy felt a lot of pressure to satisfy his growing fanbase, saying "Of course I feel more burden than before, because lots of people are watching." The new dance is characterized by fast, hip-swinging movements in Stuff.

When the song was being introduced, Adam Sherwin of The Independent reported that "A trailer posted on Psy's Twitter links to a thudding beat with a repeated lyric of 'I'm a mother, father, gentleman'. Or 'motherf***er [sic]' depending on the interpretation of Psy's accent." A poster was also released containing the main line of the song "I'm a mother fxxxxx [sic] gentleman". At a press conference for the "Happening" concert, Psy mentioned that he chose the phrase because it was easy to pronounce. He also chose "alangamola" ("I don't know if you know") as a common lyric in the song as it was easy to sing along to.

The song features more English than "Gangnam Style". The website The Huffington Post classifies the song as electropop, while Time describes it as K-pop.

In an interview with The Daily Beast, Psy said he originally planned to collaborate with Justin Bieber on the single, but he and manager Scooter Braun deferred that to make the goal of the single to prove he was not a one-hit wonder. He described the song as "a sort of a mash-up of my previous 10 tracks and 10 hooks. I made a surgery with those 10 songs."

== Reception ==
=== Critical reception ===
Professional ratings
Review scores
Source	Rating
Rolling Stone	3/5 stars
About.com	2.5/5 stars
Digital Spy	1/5 stars

Initial reactions were mixed, as critics acknowledged the catchiness of "Gentleman" but also remained skeptical as to whether it would surpass the popularity of "Gangnam Style". CNN's Jake Tapper asserted that Psy's concern about being left behind as a one-hit wonder is "completely founded". Simon Vozick-Levinson, associate editor at Rolling Stone, pointed out that "It's almost impossible to create another hit like "Gangnam Style". Psy responded to these concerns and says, "I've been doing this for 12 years. Would it be fair to call me a one-hit wonder just because my next song falls flat? I gained international fame almost by accident but that does not mean that I will make desperate efforts to maintain that global popularity. I will just continue to do what I have been doing for all these years. If it satisfies people's appetite it will. If not, it won't."

In a positive review, Nick Hasted of independent.co.uk wrote ""Gentleman" doesn't leave him as a one-hit novelty outside his homeland" and ""Gentleman" follows its predecessor's structure precisely, with its woozy synth-breaks, sonic drop-outs leaving space for Psy's interjections, chanted verses and explosive choruses."

=== Chart performance ===
==== South Korea ====
Upon its release, "Gentleman" went straight to number one on the Gaon Singles Chart on the third week of April 2013, with 429,255 digital downloads. In its second week, the song remained atop the chart, selling 443,517 copies. It also debuted at number one on Billboard's Korea K-Pop Hot 100 for the week of April 27, 2013.

==== Europe ====
In the United Kingdom, "Gentleman" entered at number 61 on the UK Singles Chart on April 14, 2013―for the week ending date April 20, 2013―after being on sale for less than 48 hours. The following week, the song leapt fifty one places to number ten, becoming Psy's second top ten hit in the country.

==== Oceania ====
In Australia, "Gentleman" debuted at number 15 on the ARIA Singles Chart on April 22, 2013, becoming the highest new entry for the week. The single also made its chart debut on the New Zealand Singles Chart at number 10 on April 22, 2013.

==== North America ====
In the United States, "Gentleman" debuted at number 12 on the Billboard Hot 100 for the week ending April 27, 2013, with 27,000 downloads sold through the end of the Nielsen SoundScan tracking week on April 14 following its digital release on April 12. It launched at number one on Streaming Songs with 8.6 million streams registered in the United States in just shy of two days since its posting on April 13. The following week the song bounded from number 12 to number five, as it tallied a second week at the top on Streaming Songs with 13.9 million U.S. streams and debuted at number 20 on Digital Songs with 72,000 downloads sold, a 167% improvement over its sum previous week. Ben Sisario of The New York Times wrote that the reason why "Gentleman" wasn't a shoo-in for number one was that even though Billboard had incorporated YouTube views and Spotify into its Hot 100 chart, only streams in the United States would count towards the chart. The week after, the song dropped to number 26 on the Billboard Hot 100.

== Music video ==
=== Background and production ===
The music video is directed by Cho Soo-hyun, who previously directed Psy's music video for "Gangnam Style", and the MV for "This Love" by Shinhwa. It is co-edited by Yang Hyun-suk. "Gentleman" was filmed on April 8 and 9 in various parts of Seoul and Goyang, South Korea. The boutique in the opener is the 10 Corso Como store in Cheongdam-dong, and the elevator scene was at the Grand InterContinental Hotel, both of which are in the Gangnam District. The elementary school was in Seongdong District, and the library was the Seoul Metropolitan Library in Seoul City Hall. A part of the hip-swing dance scenes was at the Mapo Bridge. In Goyang, scenes were shot at an indoor pool at Goyang Gymnasium, an Ilsan indoor golf driving range, and Hallyu World. South Korean TV show Infinite Challenge cast members Yoo Jae-suk, Park Myeong-su, Jeong Jun-ha, Jeong Hyeong-don, Noh Hong-chul, HaHa, and Gil make appearances in the video, with Yoo and Noh making return appearances from the "Gangnam Style" video. The two bikini girls are models; the yellow bikini girl, Sora Choi, was the winner of the third cycle of Korea's Next Top Model. Four of the other girls featured in the music video are acting majors from Dongduk Women's University in Seoul.

The video is described to have a "sexual twist" in comparison to his previous single and features Psy performing a "fast, hip-swinging dance," sporting harem pants, and an array of jackets in wide-ranging colors and sunglasses that he has become known for wearing. Before the release of the video, he hinted that the choreography will be a unique take on a classic dance by stating that "All Koreans know this dance. But (those in) other countries haven't seen it". The dance was later revealed to be the "arrogant dance" from the song "Abracadabra" by South Korean girl group Brown Eyed Girls. (Note: The "arrogant dance" involves folding the arms and swaying the hips. In the "Gentleman" version, Psy holds his hand to his chin.) Lee Joo Sun, Psy's choreographer who came up with the 'horse-riding' dance for "Gangnam Style," had said, "We have a great dance. We thought up 50 different dances, everything from a sports dance to an animal dance, but we finally decided that [Brown Eyed Girls'] dance fits the song best." The music video also features an appearance by the girl group member Ga-In. Psy reportedly paid a royalty to Brown Eyed Girls' choreographers in order to use the routine in the video. Another dance move called the "crab dance" was incorporated where one moves sideways with their hands in the shape of a crab's claw, and created by Lee Joo-sun.

Editing took place from April 10–12, while Psy was also preparing for his concert. He said that in that week, he got five years older. He estimates the production cost was larger than expected, about $150,000, partly from schedule changes on his part.

=== Synopsis ===
The video features Psy performing ungentlemanly pranks on various people until he meets a girl who pulls unmannerly pranks on him.

As a tuxedo-clad Psy, wearing sunglasses, walks up a paved street hill with an entourage of comparatively older men, he stops to kick a traffic cone. He is in a boutique with the men who follow him while holding shopping bags. As he passes through the shop's corridors, he grabs the breast-contour of a female-shaped mannequin. He lounges in a patio chair while a girl dances behind him. Psy dances at a playground with a guy (HaHa). Psy plays Candy Crush Saga on his iPhone 5, as a woman (Kim Min-sun) jogs on a treadmill, but then he adjusts the controls to speed up the treadmill, propelling the woman to the floor while he laughs. On the following scene, Psy holds the hands of a girl (Bang Kyung-ran) at a restaurant table, while Noh Hong-chul thrusts his pelvis in the background. Psy then pushes the bottom of her coffee cup to her face.

Yoo Jae-suk, wearing his yellow tuxedo and sunglasses as in the "Gangnam Style" video, rushes into an elevator, urgently needing to reach a bathroom, but Psy arrives and stalls the trip by pushing all the elevator floor buttons; he taunts the doubled-over Yoo with his dance. At a library, Psy farts in his hand—cupping it to contain and concentrate the flatus—and then, depicted in slow motion, delivers it in front of the face of a girl (Kim Hyun-Joo). (Note: Todd Gilchrist of MTV calls the farting prank a "stink-palm", while Susannah Butter of Evening Standard (London) calls it a "cupcake".)

In a pink tuxedo, Psy does the hip-swaying dance while putting his hand to his chin, while the dancers do the same; the women have their backs to the viewers so they sway with their ponytails. Psy crashes a kids' soccer game and kicks their ball away. He applies lotion to a girl in a violet bikini (Ji Ho-jin) and a girl in a yellow bikini (Choi So-ra) while a guy (Gil Seong-joon) carefully works a hair dryer and brush on his bald head. Psy undoes the yellow bikini girl's top. He then lies on his belly on the floor while two guys (Park Myeong-su and Jeong Jun-ha) sway on top of him. He takes a girl (Kim Sol) to be seated at a restaurant, but pulls the chair away, causing her to fall. Another guy (Jeong Hyeong-don) offers his hand to help her up, but yanks her down instead. (Note: In the original storyline, the girl chases after Psy, who has left the restaurant without paying.)

Psy sees a girl (Ga-In) who is working out in a "body-hugging football outfit" with the red letter 'G'. He takes off his jacket, flings it at her and does a pull up. As he leaves, the girl follows him. They go to a tented market cafe where she abruptly pulls the seat from under him and shakes up his beer. Psy plays around with noodle dough as if it were a feather boa; while he sucks at some hand-pulled Korean noodles, she is chewing on an oden fishcake on a stick. He and the dancers do the sway again. He parties with the people at the tent. He starts saying "Wet Psy!" He sits with the two bikini-clad girls. He sings "Wet Psy!" over and over. He raises his arms to show his sweat-soaked armpits. (Note: The clip where Psy raises his arms with sweat-soaked armpits is from the Korean show Infinite Challenge.) He and the two girls are catapulted into the swimming pool. He and the dancers sway at the pool, an indoor field, and outdoors.

The after-song footage has an outtake from the tent cafe. The girl dances around the pole of a street sign while Psy does the same with a wider traffic light pole. A girl is about to make a photocopy when Psy rushes in and photocopies his face. The copier prints the stylized promotional intertitle of the song and music video.

=== Release ===
The "Gentleman" music video was posted on YouTube on Saturday, April 13, 2013, shortly following a live premiere and performance from Psy's live concert, which was streamed online. The song was released at midnight on April 12 in each time zone. People seeking access to the song early online were blocked by Psy's record company, Universal, but Time reports that others were able to access the song prematurely. When asked why he released the song a day before his "Happening" concert, he stated via Twitter "cause We Gotta Sing Along".

On April 18, the video was banned by South Korea's state broadcaster, the Korean Broadcasting System (KBS), because it contains a scene of Psy "abusing public property" by kicking a traffic cone that says "no parking" (주차 금지) during the first five seconds of the video. On April 24, Munhwa Broadcasting Corporation (MBC) passed the deliberation of the music video.

=== Reception ===
Todd Gilchrist of MTV described the video to have "effectively parod(ied) a rich heel, subjecting ladies within his celebrity orbit to 'Billy Madison'-style gags like pulling chairs out from beneath them and speeding up treadmills until they fall off."

==== Viewership ====
The audio-only version of the song had more than 1.2 million YouTube hits prior to its concert premiere, which was seen online by 160,000. The music video for "Gentleman" reached 18.9 million views on YouTube on the day of its release; which broke the previous single-day viewership record for music videos set by Justin Bieber's "Beauty and a Beat" at 10.6 million views. On April 22, Kevin Allocca of YouTube reported that the video "set the record for the most views ever in a single day with the over 38 million 'Gentleman' achieved on April 14", which beat the previous single-day record of 31 million views set by "KONY 2012"—a documentary about a Ugandan warlord made by the charity group Invisible Children. This was certified as a Guinness World Record. This record was later beaten by Taylor Swift with her 2017 single "Look What You Made Me Do" which accumulated 43.2 million views in 24 hours.

Gentleman reached 100 million views on April 17, just four days after its release. It became the fastest music video to reach 100 million, beating "Bad Romance" by Lady Gaga, and tied with the Russian Meteor video for the fastest overall video to reach 100 million. It became the fastest video to reach 200 million views. It reached 300 million views in 613 hours (25.5 days), and 400 million views in 55 days. It reached 500 million views on July 31, 110 days after its release. All these records were later surpassed by Taylor Swift's "Look What You Made Me Do". As of August 2025, it has received over 1.6 billion views.

== Live performances ==
On May 3, 2013, Psy made a return appearance on The Today Show on NBC in New York City, where he performed "Gentleman", and talked with the anchors about the dance. On May 16, 2013, Psy made his first guest performance of "Gentleman" at the season 12 finale of American Idol. Psy performed "Gentleman" at the Germany's Next Topmodel, Cycle 8 finale. He performed the song at the final of Britain's Got Talent scheduled for June 8. Psy also performed the song at the Canadian 2013 MuchMusic Video Awards on June 16. He said it was the last televised performance of "Gentleman."

== Accolades ==
"Gentleman" won 8 first place trophies on South Korean music programs, including a triple crown (or three wins) on M Countdown and Inkigayo.

Music program awards
Program	Date	Ref.
M Countdown	April 18, 2013	
M Countdown	April 25, 2013	
M Countdown	May 2, 2013	
Music Bank	April 26, 2013	
Show! Music Core	April 27, 2013	
Inkigayo	April 21, 2013	
Inkigayo	April 28, 2013	
Inkigayo	May 5, 2013	

== Track listing ==
Digital download
No.	Title	Writer(s)	Length
1.	"Gentleman"	Psy, Yoo Gun-hyung	3:14

12" Vinyl
No.	Title	Writer(s)	Length
1.	"Gentleman (Extended Version)"	Psy, Yoo Gun-hyung	4:45

== Charts and certifications ==
=== Weekly charts ===
Weekly chart performance
Chart (2013)	Peak position
Australia (ARIA)	15
Austria (Ö3 Austria Top 40)	7
Belgium (Ultratop 50 Flanders)	2
Belgium (Ultratop 50 Wallonia)	2
Canada Hot 100 (Billboard)	9
CIS Airplay (TopHit)	77
Czech Republic Airplay (ČNS IFPI)	21
Denmark (Tracklisten)	3
Finland (Suomen virallinen lista)	2
France (SNEP)	11
Germany (GfK)	12
Iceland (Tónlist)	15
Ireland (IRMA)	13
Israel International Airplay (Media Forest)	5
Italy (FIMI)	9
Japan (Billboard Japan Hot 100)	51
Luxembourg (Billboard)	1
Mexico Anglo (Monitor Latino)	7
Netherlands (Single Top 100)	8
Netherlands (Dutch Top 40)	15
New Zealand (Recorded Music NZ)	10
Norway (VG-lista)	13
Portugal (Billboard)	6
Russia Airplay (TopHit)	79
Scottish Singles Sales (Official Charts)	8
Slovakia Airplay (ČNS IFPI)	42
Spain (Promusicae)	7
South Korea (Gaon Digital Singles)	1
South Korea (Billboard K-Pop Hot 100)	1
Sweden (Sverigetopplistan)	8
Switzerland (Schweizer Hitparade)	3
Ukraine Airplay (TopHit)	126
UK Singles (Official Charts)	10
US Billboard Hot 100	5
US Hot Rap Songs (Billboard)	3
US Hot Dance Club Songs (Billboard)	33
US Hot Dance/Electronic Songs (Billboard)	1
Venezuela Pop/Rock General (Record Report)	2

=== Year-end charts ===
Annual chart rankings
Chart (2013)	Position
Austria (Ö3 Austria Top 40)	65
Belgium (Ultratop Flanders)	69
Belgium (Ultratop Wallonia)	63
France (SNEP)	123
Germany (Media Control AG)	65
Italy (FIMI)	93
Netherlands (Dutch Top 40)	107
South Korea (Gaon Digital Singles)	1
Sweden (Sverigetopplistan)	81
Switzerland (Schweizer Hitparade)	65
UK Singles (Official Charts Company)	103
US Hot Dance/Electronic Songs (Billboard)	14
US Streaming Songs (Billboard)	24

=== Certifications and sales ===
Certifications and sales
Region	Certification	Certified units/sales
Australia (ARIA)	Gold	35,000^{^}
Brazil (Pro-Música Brasil)	Platinum	60,000^{‡}
Denmark (IFPI Danmark)	Gold	900,000^{†}
Germany (BVMI)	Gold	150,000^{‡}
Italy (FIMI)	Gold	15,000^{*}
New Zealand (RMNZ)	Gold	7,500^{*}
South Korea	—	1,604,778
Sweden (GLF)	Platinum	40,000^{‡}
United Kingdom (BPI)	Silver	200,000^{‡}
^{*} Sales figures based on certification alone.^{^} Shipments figures based on certification alone.^{‡} Sales+streaming figures based on certification alone.^{†} Streaming-only figures based on certification alone.

== Release history ==
Release dates for "Gentleman"
Region	Label	Date	Format
South Korea	YG	April 12, 2013	Digital download
Worldwide	School Boy; Republic	April 12, 2013	Digital download
Germany	School Boy; Republic	May 17, 2013	CD single
Philippines	School Boy; Republic; YG; MCA	May 28, 2013	CD single
