= Yoo Gun-hyung =

South Korean musician (born 1979)

- Born: February 14, 1979 (age 47)
- Occupations: Songwriter; record producer
- Years active: 1996–1999 (Untitle) 2002-present
- Organization: P Nation

Yoo Gun-hyung (Korean: 유건형; born February 14, 1979) is a South Korean songwriter and record producer. He was credited with production on PSY's 2012 single "Gangnam Style".

== Biography ==
Yoo Gun-Hyung was introduced to the world of K-pop in 1996 as one-half (along with Suh Jung-Hwan) of the Korean hip hop duo Untitle. Yoo and Suh were both still in high school, and gained particular recognition in the Korean music industry because they were already writing their own songs. Their second album, entitled The Blue Color was released in 1997. Untitle disbanded in 1999.

Yoo's collaboration with PSY goes back at least to 2006, with Yoo writing music and PSY writing lyrics for songs on the 2006 album PSY – We Are The One. They have also co-written songs for IVY, Kim Jin-pyo, and Ulala Session.

It has also been reported that Yoo and former Untitle co-member Suh have been working with Jang Woo Hyuk (formerly of H.O.T.) on a solo project.

"Gangnam Style", the lead single of PSY 6 (Six Rules), Part 1, which Yoo co-wrote with PSY, was released on July 15, 2012, and the music video was uploaded to YouTube the same day. Within weeks, the video had made it to No. 3 on YouTube's music video list. Then in August, the video went viral outside of the Korean-speaking world, and by September had become the most "liked" video in the history of YouTube.

== Working with Psy ==
Yoo Gun Hyung's current career is centered around Psy and the singers of P NATION. All have songs with titles written by Yoo Gun Hyung.

He collaborated with Psy on the song "1등 (1st Place)" from Psy's 2nd album "Ssa2" (2002), and co-wrote with Psy on the song "Night" (feat. Park Mi-kyung) from the 3rd album "3 Mai".

Yoo has collaborated on almost every song from Psy's fourth album "Ssajib" and onwards, only the title track "Entertainer" (연예인) and the song "They Are Friends" (친구놈들아) were co-written, but from Psy's fifth album onwards, there are almost no songs written by just Psy or Yoo Gun-hyung exclusively. In the fifth album "PSYFIVE", all but one song was composed and arranged by Psy & Yoo Gun-hyung, and in the now legendary sixth album "Psy 6 (Six Rules)," not only "Gangnam Style," but also "Year of 77 (77학개론)," "What Would Have Been? (어땠을까)," "Blue Frog" (청개구리) and "Never Say Goodbye" were all co-written and arranged by Psy Yoo Gun-hyung. The same is true for his later works, "Gentleman" (2013), 7th album "Chiljip Psy-da" (2015), and his 8th album "4×2=8" (2017).

When Psy moved to YG Entertainment in 2010, he followed him, and when Psy left YG Entertainment in 2018 Yoo also left with him, joining him at his Psy's label P Nation in 2019 as a songwriter for all current talent.
