= OR4X2 =

Protein-coding gene in the species Homo sapiens

Identifiers
- Aliases: OR4X2, OR11-105, olfactory receptor family 4 subfamily X member 2 (gene/pseudogene), olfactory receptor family 4 subfamily X member 2
- External IDs: MGI: 3031099; GeneCards: OR4X2

Gene location (Human)
Chr.	Chromosome 11 (human)
Band	11p11.2	Start	48,245,104 bp
Band	11p11.2	End	48,246,015 bp

Gene location (Mouse)
Chr.	Chromosome 2 (mouse)
Band	2|2 E1	Start	89,865,681 bp
Band	2|2 E1	End	89,872,558 bp
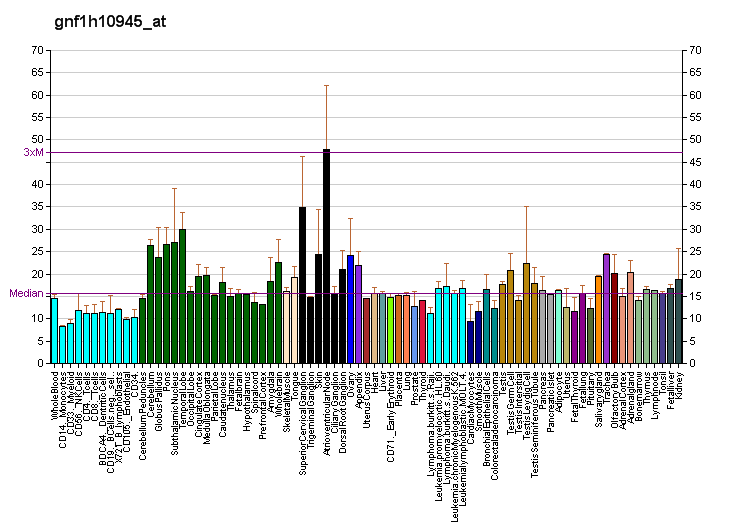
RNA expression pattern
Bgee	Human / Mouse (ortholog); Top expressed in: granulocyte / n/a; More reference expression data
BioGPS	More reference expression data
Gene ontology
Molecular function	G protein-coupled receptor activity; olfactory receptor activity; transmembrane signaling receptor activity; signal transducer activity
Cellular component	integral component of membrane; plasma membrane; membrane
Biological process	sensory perception of smell; detection of chemical stimulus involved in sensory perception of smell; detection of chemical stimulus involved in sensory perception; signal transduction; response to stimulus; G protein-coupled receptor signaling pathway
Sources:Amigo / QuickGO
Orthologs
Databases	NCBI: entry; OMA: entry
Species	Human	Mouse
Entrez	119764	258340
Ensembl	ENSG00000172208	ENSMUSG00000059910
UniProt	Q8NGF9	Q8VEZ3
RefSeq (mRNA)	NM_001004727	NM_146343
RefSeq (protein)	NP_001004727	NP_666455
Location (UCSC)	Chr 11: 48.25 – 48.25 Mb	Chr 2: 89.87 – 89.87 Mb
PubMed search
- Wikidata
View/Edit Human	View/Edit Mouse

Olfactory receptor 4X2 is a protein that in humans is encoded by the OR4X2 gene.

Olfactory receptors interact with odorant molecules in the nose, to initiate a neuronal response that triggers the perception of a smell. The olfactory receptor proteins are members of a large family of G-protein-coupled receptors (GPCR) arising from single coding-exon genes. Olfactory receptors share a 7-transmembrane domain structure with many neurotransmitter and hormone receptors and are responsible for the recognition and G protein-mediated transduction of odorant signals. The olfactory receptor gene family is the largest in the genome. The nomenclature assigned to the olfactory receptor genes and proteins for this organism is independent of other organisms.

== See also ==
- Olfactory receptor
