= New Men (EP) =

EP by BTOB
- Released: November 7, 2016
- Genre: Ballad; Dance-pop; Rock
- Length: 22:59
- Language: Korean
- Label: Cube Entertainment; Universal Music Group

BTOB chronology
Remember That (2016)	New Men (2016)	Feel'eM (2017)

Singles from New Men
- 1. "Pray (I'll Be Your Man)" Released: November 7, 2016

Music videos
- "기도(I'll be your man)" on YouTube

New Men is the ninth extended play by South Korean boy group BTOB. The EP was released by Cube Entertainment on November 7, 2016 and contains 7 tracks including the lead single "Pray (I'll Be Your Man)".

== Background and release ==
After consecutively releasing ballad songs, BTOB was revealed to release a dance title track after 2 years and 2 months since "You're so Fly" in 2014.

On November 7, BTOB released their ninth EP New Men with the title track, "I'll Be Your Man" (기도). "I'll Be Your Man" is described as an emotional dance track with trap elements that talks about not being able to forget a past love and praying to be with her again. It was written and composed by member Im Hyun-sik. A music video for the title track was released on the same day, featuring CLC's Elkie.

== Track listing ==
No.	Title	Lyrics	Music	Arrangement	Length
1.	"NEW MEN"	Im Hyun-sik	Im Hyun-sik	Im Hyun-sik	1:31
2.	"Pray (I'll Be Your Man)" (기도 (I'll Be Your Man))	Im Hyun-sik; Lee Minhyuk; Peniel; Jung Il-hoon	Im Hyun-sik; EDEN; Nathan	Im Hyun-sik; EDEN; Nathan	3:39
3.	"Love Drunk" (취해)	Jung Il-hoon; IL	Jung Il-hoon; IL	Jung Il-hoon; IL	3:37
4.	"I'm Bored" (무료해 (콕 To Me))	Son Young-jin; Jo Seung-ho; Kang Dong-ha; Jung Il-hoon; Lee Minhyuk; Peniel	Son Young-jin; Jo Seung-ho; Kang Dong-ha	Son Young-jin; Jo Seung-ho; Kang Dong-ha	3:15
5.	"Yes I Am"	Ferdy; Jo Seung-ho; Jung Il-hoon; Lee Minhyuk; Peniel	Ferdy; Jo Seung-ho	Ferdy; Jo Seung-ho	3:30
6.	"Come On Over" (놀러와)	Jung Il-hoon; IL; Lee Min-hyuk; Peniel	Jung Il-hoon; IL; Black	Jung Il-hoon; IL	3:32
7.	"Now The Future Pass Of This Love" (예지앞사)	Seo Eun-kwang; Lee Minhyuk; Lee Chang-sub; Im Hyun-sik; Peniel; Jung Il-hoon; Yook Sungjae	Kairos; Jesper Borgen	Kairos; Jesper Borgen; Wes Koz	3:55
Total length:					22:59
