= SF X Fantasy Rayforce =

- Also known as: 시공전기 레이포스
- Hangul: 시공전기 레이포스
- Hanja: 時空傳記레이포스
- RR: Sigongjeongi reiposeu
- MR: Sigongjŏn'gi reip'osŭ
- Genre: Tokusatsu
- Created by: T3 Entertainment
- Written by: Bom Ui-hwan
- Directed by: Jun Jae-hoon
- Starring: Jeong Seol-hee
- Country of origin: South Korea
- Original language: Korean
- No. of seasons: 2
- No. of episodes: 52

Production
- Producer: Ko Jeong-jin

SF X Fantasy Rayforce (Korean: 시공전기 레이포스; RR: Sigongjeongi reiposeu; lit. 'Time-Space Chronicle Rayforce') was a proposed South Korean television series that was to be produced by MMORPG developer T3 Entertainment. The show was planned to last for two 26-episode seasons. Rayforce was made as a response to the popularity of Japanese tokusatsu superhero programs in South Korea, and was to be accompanied by video games and toys. It was planned to be broadcast in South Korea in the second half of 2010. Broadcasting rights were sold to broadcasters in Thailand and negotiations were in progress for broadcasters in Taiwan, Hong Kong, and the Philippines. As of January 2012, the series has been shelved due to a lack of investors.

The PV was directed by director Jun Jae-hoon (전재훈). The male lead was played by Lee Min-hyuk of the seven-member male music group BTOB, and the female lead was played by Jeong Seol-hee, a second-generation TTL girl.
