= BtoB 4U =

Sub-unit of BtoB

- BtoB 4U Logo

Background information
- Origin: Seoul, South Korea
- Genres: K-pop; R&B
- Years active: 2020–2021
- Label: Cube
- Spinoff of: BtoB
- Members: Seo Eun-kwang; Lee Min-hyuk; Lee Chang-sub; Peniel
- Website: universal-music.co.jp/btob4u

BtoB 4U (Korean: 비투비 포유; RR: Bitubi poyu; stylized in all caps) is the second official sub-unit of South Korean boy band BtoB formed under Cube Entertainment. The sub-group consisted of members who have completed their military service Seo Eun-kwang, Lee Min-hyuk, Lee Chang-sub, and Peniel, who is exempt from conscription. They debuted on November 16, 2020, with the extended play (EP) Inside.

== History ==
=== 2020–2021: Formation and debut, Kingdom: Legendary War. ===
The quartet’s first activity as an unofficial unit was the Naver Now show BTOB NOW: Our Concert, which was hosted by Seo Eun-kwang, Lee Min-hyuk, Lee Chang-sub, and Peniel, and was aired for 3 weeks starting October 27. Throughout the broadcast, the quartet performed numerous songs on 'BtoB Masterpiece One Bar Live' and communicated freely with fans through 'Real-time Q&A'. Their last episode was on November 18.

BtoB 4U is a sub-unit of BtoB, formed four years after BtoB Blue, and is composed of Seo Eun-kwang, Lee Min-hyuk, Lee Chang-sub, and Peniel. The group was formed due to other BtoB members' military enlistment. The name BtoB 4U is the name given by Lee Min-hyuk's brother. On Kang Han-na's Volume Up, Lee stated "It's not my idea. My brother asked me, 'How's the name for you?'." The name contains a double meaning of 'For you' and '4 members united'. It also refers to how there are four members in the unit. Other unit names that were selected after a public survey are BtoB Sky, BtoB Purple, BtoB Black, TeleToB, and SaToB (4 ToB).

On October 30, Cube Entertainment officially announced the unit’s debut date with the album Inside. On November 16, the group debuted with a moombahton dance genre song "Show Your Love" that contains a hopeful message to live and love each other even in difficult times. The song was composed by Im Hyun-sik, composed before his military enlistment. BtoB 4U received their first-ever music show win on SBS MTV's The Show on November 24, 8 days after their debut. On December 2, the group released the official Japanese version of the song.

On January 28, 2021, it was officially announced that BtoB 4U would participate in the Mnet competition series Kingdom: Legendary War as BtoB, due to the other members serving in the military.

== Philanthropy ==
On November 23, 2020, BtoB 4U made a donation of 50,000 masks to Seongdong-gu office for essential workers, childcare workers who are playing their role in the field despite the prolonged spreading of COVID-19. The group expressed their gratitude, saying, "Due to [Covid-19], both children and teachers must continue to wear masks, so they will use two masks a day."

== Discography ==
=== Extended plays ===
Title	Details	Peak chart positions			Sales
Title	Details	KOR	JPN	JPN Hot	Sales
Inside	Released: November 16, 2020; Label: Cube Entertainment; Formats: CD, digital download	3	43	74	KOR: 62,869; JPN: 1,566

=== Singles ===
Title	Year	Peak chart positions		Sales	Album
Title	Year	KOR	KOR Hot	Sales	Album
"Show Your Love" (Note: "Show Your Love (Japanese version)" was released on December 2, 2020.)	2020	72	72	—N/a	Inside

=== Other charted songs ===
Title	Year	Peak chart positions	Album
Title	Year	KOR	Album
"Mirage" (신기루)	2020	— (Note: "Mirage" did not enter Gaon Digital Chart, but debuted and peaked at number 46 on Gaon Download Chart.)	Inside
"Alone" (그대로예요)	2020	— (Note: "Alone" did not enter Gaon Digital Chart, but debuted and peaked at number 53 on Gaon Download Chart.)	Inside
"Bull's Eye"	2020	— (Note: "Bull's Eye" did not enter Gaon Digital Chart, but debuted and peaked at number 61 on Gaon Download Chart.)	Inside
"Tension"	2020	— (Note: "Tension" did not enter Gaon Digital Chart, but debuted and peaked at number 63 on Gaon Download Chart.)	Inside
"—" denotes a recording that did not chart or was not released in that territory.

=== Music videos ===
Title	Year	Director(s)	Ref.
"Show Your Love"	2020	Jang Jae-hyuk	

== Filmography ==
=== Reality shows ===
Year	Title	Season/Episode	Network	Note(s)
2020	BTOB 4U x Star Road	10	V Live	Every Monday and Thursday (December 3–17, 2020)

== Concerts ==
Date	Title	Ref.
November 30, 2020	Naver Now Party B	
January 23, 2021	2021 BtoB 4U Online Concert [INSIDE]	
