= Seo Eun-kwang =

South Korean singer (born 1990)

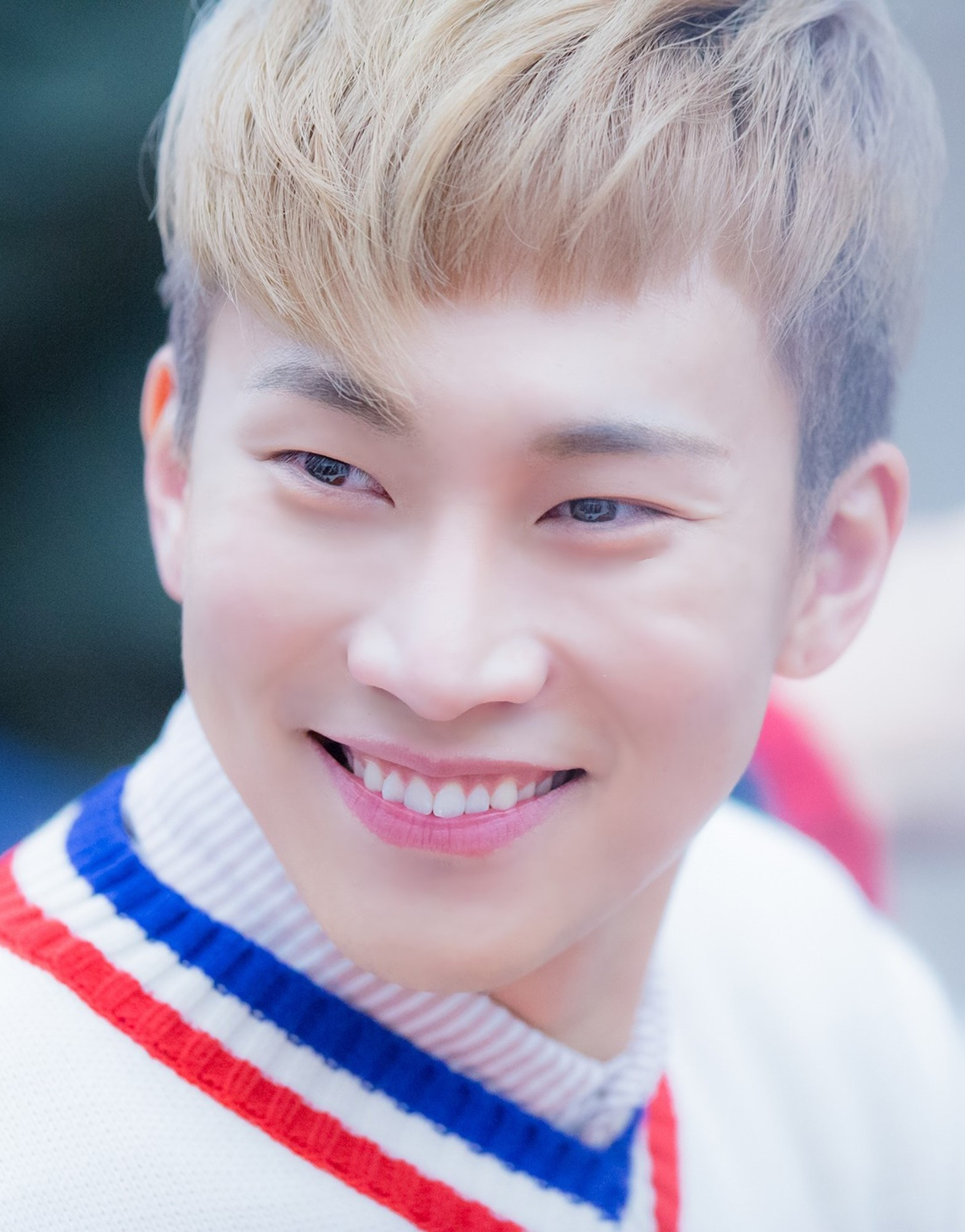
- Seo in November 2016
- Born: Seo Eun-kwang; November 22, 1990 (age 35); Yongin, South Korea
- Occupations: Singer; songwriter; entertainer; musical actor
- Years active: 2012–present
- Musical career
- Genres: K-pop; dance-pop; R&B; ballad
- Instrument: Vocals
- Labels: Cube; BtoB Company
- Member of: BtoB; United Cube
- Formerly of: BtoB Blue; BtoB 4U

Korean name
- Hangul: 서은광
- Hanja: 徐恩光
- RR: Seo Eungwang
- MR: Sŏ Ŭn'gwang

Signature
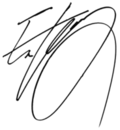

Seo Eun-kwang (Korean: 서은광; born November 22, 1990), also simply known as Eunkwang, is a South Korean singer, songwriter, entertainer and musical actor. He is the leader and main vocalist of the South Korean boy group BtoB.

== Biography ==
Seo was born on November 22, 1990, in Yongin, Gyeonggi in South Korea. He graduated from Dongshin University, majoring in practical music. He has one younger brother named Seo Eun-chong.

=== Military service ===
Seo reportedly began military duty by enlisting as an active duty soldier in the military band on August 21, 2018, at the ROK army's 27th division, nicknamed the 'We Will Win' unit in Gangwon Province's Hwacheon County. In October 2018, he received first place out of the recruits in the overall results during basic training. On March 14, he was selected as ROK-SWC for receiving more than 90 points in sit-ups, push-ups, 3 km running, 10 km full combat gear marching and more.

He was discharged from the army on April 7, 2020.

=== Philanthropy ===
In 2017, Seo participated in the Donation Applause 337 Relay Campaign with another 200 entertainers and sports stars. The campaign is to share more than three donations and to send warmth to more than three friends and purchase more than 7,000 won. This resulting in Seo's 418 fans donated to the Children's Rehabilitation Hospital, a building facility who was fully funded by Seo to treat children with severe disabilities. On November 21, 2017, Seo and his fans donated ₩10 million to help children with childhood diabetes. Cube Entertainment revealed, "Eunkwang's fans wanted to do something nice for his birthday and started collecting donations for the Korea Diabetes Association, which BtoB works as ambassadors. When Eunkwang heard his fans were preparing to donate, he told the label that he wanted to participate as well and he participated in the donation and delivered the scholarship letter himself."

On April 9, 2019, while serving the military, Seo donated ₩20 million to help the affected areas of the Sokcho Fire through Hope Bridge National Disaster Relief Association.

In January 2020, Korea Heart Foundation reveals that Seo donated ₩20 million to help financially troubled heart patients at the end of 2019. In April 2020, BtoB's fan club 'Melody' donated women's hygiene products to commemorate Seo's discharge. The fan club delivered 3,201 sanitary napkins and wipes through World Human Bridge for pregnant women in vulnerable families who are suffering from COVID-19.

On February 9, 2023, Seo donated 10 million won to help in the 2023 Turkey–Syria earthquake through the Children's Foundation.

== Career ==
=== BtoB ===
Seo debuted as the leader and main vocalist of Cube Entertainment's boy group BtoB on March 21, 2012, with the promotional single "Insane". The group is currently active with ten mini albums and two studio album. Eunkwang also contributed as the lyricist in their fourth mini album, Beep Beep with the song "Melody" that is dedicated to their fans.

=== Solo activities, acting and debut ===
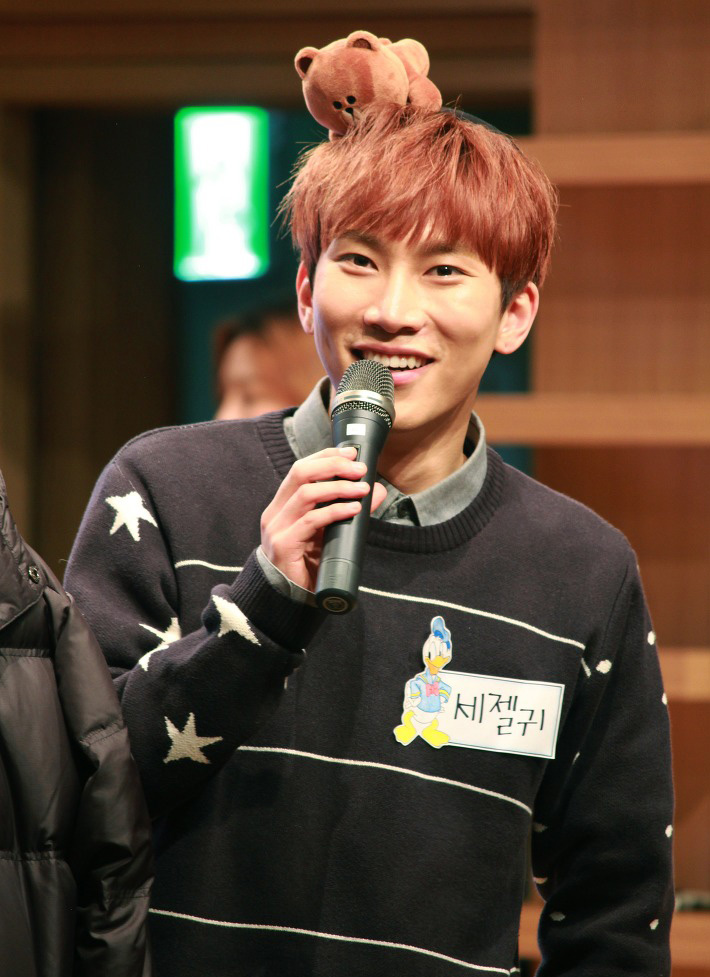
Seo in 2015

In 2012, he released a digital single with singer U Sung-eun entitled "Love Virus". A music video was uploaded to BtoB's official YouTube channel, featuring 4Minute's Nam Jihyun and singer Roh Ji-hoon.

In 2013, Seo made his musical debut as Albert in the musical Monte Cristo. He gained good responses after his performance. He also joined the cast of the musical, Bachelor's Vegetable Store as Chul Jin-yeok.

In 2014, he became a fixed cast on tvN's variety show SNL Korea 5. He also released the song "Back in the Day" as part of the Cube Voice Project Part 2.

In 2015, he sang the OST for the drama Mask with singer Miyu. It was entitled "I Miss You." He also joined the studio panel in the MBC variety show, and virtual marriage program, We Got Married.

In 2017–2018, Seo was active in the Korean musical theater scene. He was cast in Hamlet, Goddess Is Watching You, Three Musketeers and Barnum: The Great Showman. Due to the sudden news of his enlistment, he was only able to perform 6 of the shows for Barnum: The Great Showman despite practice.

On April 25, 2020, Seo broadcast a 12 hours YouTube Live, Silverlight Is Back on Btob's official channel to celebrate his discharge from the military. On May 7, 2020, it was announced that Seo would release his debut EP in June. He is the sixth member of BtoB to debut as a solo artist. To accompany the release of the EP, Seo will release "Dear My Dear" (Korean: 서랍; lit. "Drawer"), which served as a pre-release single for Seo's upcoming first solo mini album. Seo's first solo mini album was released on June 8, 2020, with the title FoRest: Entrance. Its released was followed shortly with the announcement of his first solo concert. Due to the COVID-19 situation in South Korea at the time, the concert was held online.

On August 13, 2020, Seo's appointment as a member of Cube Entertainment's board of directors was revealed through the company's 2020 half term report. Seo thereby became the first artist within Cube Entertainment to reach a director position within the agency.

On October 27, 2020, Cube announced that they have formed a unit called BtoB 4U consisting of Eunkwang, Minhyuk, Changsub and Peniel. The unit debuted on November 16 with their first mini-album, Inside and title track "Show Your Love".

BtoB, including Eunkwang, departed Cube in November 2023, with Eunkwang stepping down from his director position.

In December, 2023, he was announced as a judge for upcoming boy group survival show Build Up: Vocal Boy Group Survival. The show ran from January 26, 2024, to March 29, 2024.

In February 2024, BtoB announced the establishment of BtoB Company for the group activities and for Eunkwang's solo activities.

== Discography ==
=== Studio album ===
List of studio albums, with selected chart positions and sales
Title	Album details	Peak chart positions	Sales
Title	Album details	KOR	Sales
Unfold	Released: December 4, 2025; Label: BtoB Company, Kakao M; Format: CD, digital download; Track listing: 1. "My Door"; 2. "Last Light"; 3. "Greatest Moment"; 4. "Breath of Hope"; 5. "Elsewhere"; 6. "Parachute"; 7. "Monster"; 8. "Love & Peace"; 9. "Run to You"; 10. "Glory"	8	KOR: 38,388

=== Extended play ===
List of EPs, with selected chart positions and sales
Title	EP details	Peak chart positions	Sales
Title	EP details	KOR	Sales
FoRest: Entrance	Released: June 8, 2020; Label: Cube Entertainment, Kakao M; Format: CD, digital download; Track listing: 1. "Drawer" (서랍); 2. "Know Nothing" (아무도 모른다); 3. "Have a Nice Day"; 4. "Even If There's Nothing That Is Forever in the World (Walk)" (세상에 영원한 게 없다 해도(WALK)); 5. "Four Seasons" (사계); 6. "Love Again"; 7. "Blue Bird" (파랑새)	9	KOR: 30,237

=== Songs ===
Title	Year	Peak chart positions	Sales (DL)	Album
Title	Year	KOR	Sales (DL)	Album
As lead artist
"Back in the Days"	2014	—	KOR: 18,557	Cube Voice Project Part 2
"One Day"	2017	57	KOR: 36,646	Piece of BTOB Volume 7
"Dear My Dear" (Korean: 서랍; lit. "Drawer")	2020	— (Note: "Dear My Dear" did not enter Gaon Digital Chart, but debuted and peaked at number 53 on Gaon Download Chart.)	—N/a	Non-album singles
"The Little Prince" (Korean: 어린왕자)	2024	105	—N/a	Non-album singles
"Last Night"	2025	—	—N/a	Unfold
"Greatest Moment"	2025	—	—N/a	Unfold
"Feel Alive" (featuring Peniel Shin)	2026	—	—N/a	Our Youth
Collaborations
"Love Virus" (with Yoo Sung-eun)	2012	74	KOR: 87,146	Non-album singles
"Fingertips Love" (with Changsub and Various artists )	2016	—	—N/a	Non-album singles
"So Do You" (with NC.A)	2018	45	—N/a	Non-album singles
"Let's Meet Once" (with Kim Bo Kyung)	2018	60	—N/a	Non-album singles
"Sorry (미안해)" (with Changsub and Minhyuk)	2019	96	—N/a	Non-album singles
Soundtrack appearances
"I Miss You" (with Mi Yoo)	2015	—	—N/a	Mask OST
"Goodbye Sadness" (with Changsub, Ilhoon)	2015	—	—N/a	Sweet, Savage Family OST
"For You" (with Minhyuk, Changsub, Ilhoon)	2016	—	—N/a	Cinderella and Four Knights OST
"Ambiguous" (with Hyunsik, Sungjae)	2017	37	KOR: 155,093+	Fight for My Way OST
"Dreaming of Spring (Winter Sleep)"	2018	—	—N/a	Queen of Mystery 2 OST
"Why'd You Leave Me" (왜, 너만)	2021	— (Note: "Why, Only You" did not enter Gaon Digital Chart, but debuted and peaked at number 58 on Gaon Download Chart.)	—N/a	Replay: The Moment OST
"Dreamin"	2021	—	—N/a	Let Me Be Your Knight OST
"Once in a Minute" (1분에 한 번)	2022	—	—N/a	Moonshine OST
"How Can I Forget You"	2022	—	—N/a	The Forbidden Marriage OST
"100 Wins" (지피지기 백전백승)	2024	—	—N/a	Chief Detective 1958 OST
"—" denotes releases that did not chart or were not released in that region.

== Awards and nominations ==
Awards	Year	Category	Recipient/ Nominated Work	Result
Immortal Songs: Singing the Legend	2017	Chuseok Special: Sings with Family	Seo Eunkwang & Hwang Soonok – "With Love"	Won
Immortal Songs: Singing the Legend	2022	Kim Bum-Soo Special	Seo Eunkwang	Won
Immortal Songs: Singing the Legend	2022	2022 King of Kings Special	Kim Ki-Tae and Seo Eunkwang	Won
Immortal Songs: Singing the Legend	2024	Baek Ji-Young Special	Seo Eunkwang	Won
Korea First Brand Awards	2021	Male Variety Idol	Seo Eunkwang	Won
16th Daegu International Musical Festival	2022	Rookie of the Year	Xcalibur as King Arthur	Won
