= Lee Chang-sub =

South Korean singer (born 1991)

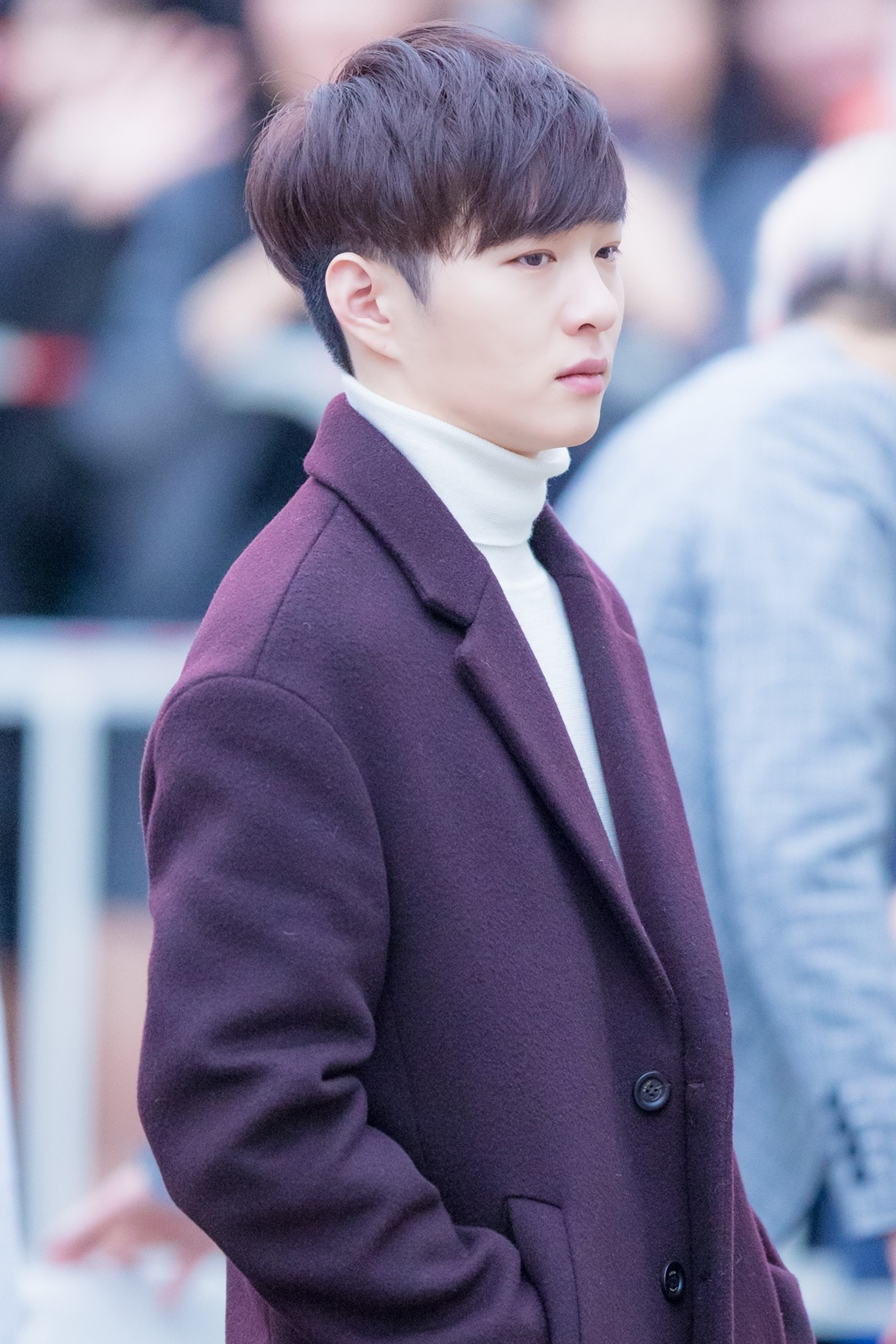
- Lee in 2016
- Born: February 26, 1991 (age 35); Suwon, Gyeonggi-do, South Korea
- Education: Howon University
- Occupations: Singer; musical actor
- Musical career
- Genres: K-pop; dance-pop; R&B; ballad
- Years active: 2012–present
- Labels: Cube; Fantagio
- Member of: BtoB; BtoB Blue; BtoB 4U
- Formerly of: United Cube

Korean name
- Hangul: 이창섭
- RR: I Changseop
- MR: I Ch'angsŏp

Signature
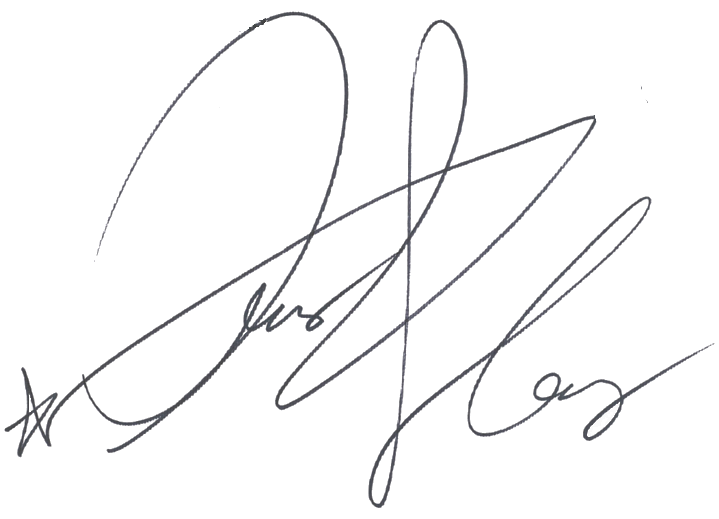

Lee Chang-sub (Korean: 이창섭; born February 26, 1991), is a South Korean singer and musical actor. He debuted as the lead vocalist of the South Korean boy group BtoB in March 2012. He debuted as a soloist in 2017, with the release of his debut single "At the End". The same year he made his theatre debut in the Korean musical adaptation of Boys Over Flowers as Goo Jun-pyo. He has also come to be known for his soundtrack collaborations, most prominently with the release of his cover of Can's "Heavenly Fate" in 2024. In 2023, he founded Chang-Ggo Training Centre vocal academy in Suwon.

== Early life and education ==
Lee Changsub was born in Suwon, Gyeonggi-do, South Korea. He studied Practical Music at Howon University with BTOB group-mate Im Hyunsik. He was admitted despite the 3000:5 acceptance rate at the time.

Prior to his debut as an idol, he won a Daesang at the 16th Suwon Music Festival 2008, and became vice-president of Red Cross Youth Gyeonggi Province in 2009.

== Career ==
=== 2012–2017: Debut with BtoB ===
Lee debuted as the lead vocalist of BtoB on March 21, 2012. Although primarily a vocalist in the group, Lee has also participated in lyric writing on a few tracks by BtoB including, "Last Day", "Killing Me" and "Melody".

He was a contestant on King of Masked Singer introducing himself as "Mr. Wifi" in 2015. In 2016, he participated in the Mongolia episodes of SBS's reality-documentary show, Law of the Jungle.

=== 2017–2022: Solo career beginnings, unit debut ===
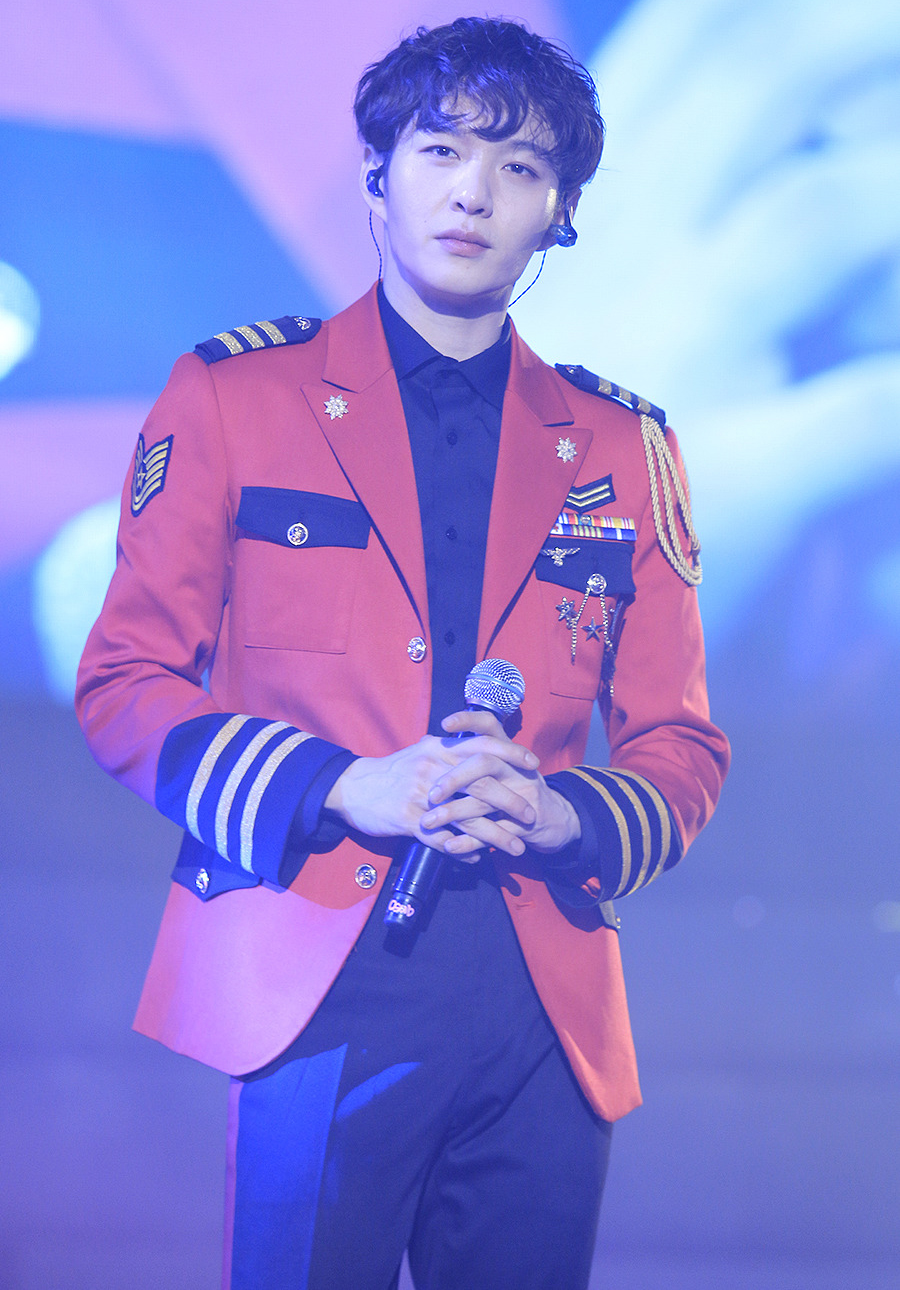
Lee at BTOB Time in January 2017

Lee Changsub released his debut solo EP, bpm 82.5, in Japan. With the title track "At The End". His Japanese debut in 2017 coincided with the launch of the Piece of BTOB project, which saw each BtoB member releasing solo digital singles during the group's promotional hiatus in the summer of 2017.

He started his career in musicals in 2017. He was cast in the musical adaptation of "Boys Over Flowers" as the lead, Goo Jun-pyo. He also played a role in the Korean production of the musical "Napoleon" as Lucien, Napoleon's little brother. Next, he was cast as the titular main character in the musical "Edgar Allan Poe".

The following year, he landed another leading role as Eddie Birdlace in "Dogfight". His final musical project before military enlistment was "Iron Mask" where he undertook the dual leading role of King Louis XIV as well as his twin brother Philippe

In December 2018, he released his first Korean solo EP titled Mark. He considered it a gift to his fans before his enlistment in January 2019. He held his first solo concert, SPACE, on January 4, 5 and 6, 2019 at the Yes24 Live Hall in Gwangjin District, Seoul.

On October 27, 2020, Cube announced that the currently active members of BtoB would form a unit called BtoB 4U consisting of Eunkwang, Minhyuk, Changsub and Peniel. The unit debuted on November 16 with their first mini-album, Inside and title track "Show Your Love".

On September 6, 2022, he released his solo single titled "reissue #001 'SURRENDER".

=== 2023–present: Departure from Cube Entertainment, solo success ===
In April 2023, he established Chang-Ggo Training Centre vocal academy in Suwon. In November 2023, BtoB members departed from Cube Entertainment following the end of their contracts. On November 23, 2023, it was announced that Lee had signed with Fantagio. Lee has stated his plans to continue BtoB group promotions despite being under a different agency to his members.

On February 21, 2024, Lee released a cover of Can's "Heavenly Fate" as an OST single for the webtoon, A Not So Fairy Tale. The single was one of the most successful singles of 2024, dominating karaoke and streaming charts, and went on to secure nominations for MAMA and the Melon Music Awards. In August, it was announced that Changsub would participate in Universe League as the director for Team Groove. On October 2, Lee released his debut studio album, 1991. Lee commenced his solo concert tour, The Wayfarer Tour, on November 30–December 1 in Seoul at the KBS Arena.

Lee released his debut essay, A Suitable Person, on February 25, 2025, topping the Korean bestseller lists.

== Personal life ==
=== Health ===
Lee developed vocal cord nodules around the time of the recording of Mark, in late 2018. In March 2024, Lee halted activities that involved singing due to his "poor throat condition". Lee later revealed that he was diagnosed with vocal cord polyps, and had had three surgeries to correct it.

=== Military service ===
He began his military duty by enlisting as an active duty soldier on January 14, 2019. On July 24, Lee recorded a special single— a new theme song for the ROK Army alongside Shinee's Onew and Key, Exo's Xiumin, Infinite's Sungkyu, 2AM's Jo Kwon and Jinwoon, Yoon Ji-sung and actors Kim Minseok, and Lee Jae-kyoon.

He was officially discharged on August 21, 2020, following the COVID-19 protocol.

== Philanthropy ==
On October 21, 2017, Lee Chang-sub visited his alma mater and delivered a scholarship of ₩10 million to his high school alma-mater, Samil Commercial High School. Changsub said, "I couldn't have imagined this when I was in school. It's an honor to be in a situation where I'm able to deliver this scholarship for the younger generation of students. I've been able to come this far thanks to my teachers and my school who helped me until the end when I was a student".

== Discography ==
=== Studio albums ===
| Title | Details | Peak chart positions | Sales |
| Title | Details | KOR | Sales |
|---|---|---|---|
| 1991 | Released: October 2, 2024; Label: Fantagio, Kakao M; Format: CD, digital download | 7 | KOR: 47,762 |

=== Extended plays ===
| Title | Details | Peak chart positions | | Sales |
| Title | Details | KOR | JPN | Sales |
|---|---|---|---|---|
| bpm82.5 | Released: June 7, 2017; Label: Kiss Entertainment; Format: CD, digital download; Track listing: 1. "At the End" (Japanese ver.); 2. "Believe in Me"; 3. "Happiness"; 4. "This Flower Is to You" (この花をあなたに; Kono Hana o anata ni) | — | 12 | JPN: 7,141 |
| Mark | Released: December 11, 2018; Label: CUBE Entertainment, Kakao M; Format: CD, digital download; Track listing: 1. "Way"; 2. "Miss You" (틈); 3. "Shelter"; 4. "Ever"; 5. "Gone"; 6. "Gone" (inst.) | 5 | — | KOR: 47,433 |
| EndAnd (이별, 이-별) | Released: October 22, 2025; Label: Fantagio, Kakao M; Format: CD, digital download; Track listing: 1. "Like the First Time" (처음처럼); 2. "In Between Love and Farewell" (사랑, 이별 그 사이; with Lyn); 3. "Trickle Down" (주르르); 4. "EndAnd"; 5. "Spotlight" | 10 | — | KOR: 54,529 |
| Lee;Make (Fragmenta Amoris) | Released: September 15, 2026; Label: Fantagio, Kakao M; Format: CD, digital download; Track listing: 1. "A Story Like a Movie" (영화 같은 이야기); 2. "Four Seasons, and You" (사계, 그리고 너); 3. "Love Again" (또 사랑이라니); 4. "Nameless Star" (이름 없는 별); 5. "Evergreen" (초록별) | 9 | — | KOR: 21,576 |
"—" denotes a recording that did not chart or was not released in that territory

=== Single albums ===
List of single albums, with selected chart positions and sales
| Title | Details | Peak chart positions | Sales |
| Title | Details | KOR | Sales |
|---|---|---|---|
| Vroom Vroom | Released: July 7, 2025; Label: Fantagio, Kakao M; Formats: QR, digital download | 16 | KOR: 28,781 |

=== Singles ===
==== As lead artist ====
List of singles as lead artist, showing year released, with selected chart positions, sales and album name
| Title | Year | Peak chart positions | Sales | Album |
| Title | Year | KOR | Sales | Album |
|---|---|---|---|---|
| "You Inside My Memories" (추억속의 그대) | 2015 | — | —N/a | —N/a |
| "At the End" | 2017 | 22 | KOR: 95,666 | Piece of BTOB Vol. 1 |
| "Gone" | 2018 | 74 | —N/a | Mark |
| "I Guess I Loved You" (사랑했나봐) | 2023 | 184 | —N/a | Non-album singles |
| "As Always" (그래, 늘 그랬듯 언제나) | 2024 | 193 | —N/a | Non-album singles |
| "Vain Hope" (희망고문) | 2024 | — (Note: "Vain Hope" did not chart on the Circle Digital Chart but peaked at 18 on the component Download Chart.) | —N/a | 1991 |
| "33" | 2024 | 177 | —N/a | 1991 |
| "Old Town" | 2024 | — (Note: "Old Town" did not chart on the Circle Digital Chart but peaked at 9 on the component Download Chart.) | —N/a | 1991 |
| "Feel the Groove" | 2025 | — (Note: "Feel the Groove" did not chart on the Circle Digital Chart but peaked at 47 on the component Download Chart.) | —N/a | Non-album singles |
| "Coward" (겁쟁이) | 2025 | – (Note: "Coward" did not chart on the Circle Digital Chart but peaked at 22 on the component Download Chart.) | —N/a | Non-album singles |
| "I Will Be Your Flower" (꽃이되어줄게) | 2025 | 137 | —N/a | Non-album singles |
| "Vroom Vroom" | 2025 | — (Note: "Vroom Vroom" did not chart on the Circle Digital Chart but peaked at 12 on the component Download Chart.) | —N/a | Vroom Vroom |
| "That Place, That Time" (그 자리에, 그 시간에) | 2025 | 131 | —N/a | Non-album single |
| "EndAnd" | 2025 | — | —N/a | EndAnd |
| "Trickle Down" (주르르) | 2025 | 120 | —N/a | EndAnd |
| "Love Again" (또 사랑이라니) | 2026 | 190 | —N/a | Lee;Make (Fragmenta Amoris) |
| "Four Seasons, and You" (사계, 그리고 너) | 2026 | 99 | —N/a | Lee;Make (Fragmenta Amoris) |
"—" denotes a recording that did not chart or was not released in that territory

==== As featured artist ====
List of singles as featured artist, showing year released and album name
| Title | Year | Album |
|---|---|---|
| "Last Taxi" (Heize feat. Changsub) | 2025 | Love Virus Pt.1 |

==== Collaborations ====
List of collaborative singles, showing year released, with selected chart positions and album name
| Title | Year | Peak chart positions | Album |
| Title | Year | KOR | Album |
|---|---|---|---|
| "The Love of Fingertips" (손끝의 사랑) (with B1A4, Eunkwang, Heo Young-ji, A-JAX, April, Oh My Girl and Kassy) | 2016 | — | —N/a |
| "Sorry" (미안해) (Eunkwang and Minhyuk) | 2019 | 96 | —N/a |
"—" denotes a recording that did not chart or was not released in that territory

==== Soundtrack appearances ====
List of soundtracks, showing year released, with selected chart positions, sales and album name
| Title | Year | Peak chart positions | Sales | Album |
| Title | Year | KOR | Sales | Album |
|---|---|---|---|---|
| "Be Alright" (with Yoseob, G.NA, Gayoon) | 2012 | 93 | KOR: 37,281 | Road for Hope OST |
| "Bye Bye Love" (with Yoseob, Dongwoon, Jung Il-hoon) | 2013 | 35 | KOR: 133,418 | When a Man Falls in Love OST |
| "Past Days" (지난 날) (with Junhyung, Ha Yeon-soo, Minhyuk, Hyunsik, Sungjae) | 2013 | 56 | KOR: 87,730 | Monstar OST |
| "After Time Passes" (시간이 흐른 뒤엔) (with Junhyung, Minhyuk, Hyunsik, Sungjae) | 2013 | 32 | KOR: 125,359 | Monstar OST |
| "First Love" (첫사랑) (with Junhyung, Minhyuk, Hyunsik, Sungjae) | 2013 | 61 | KOR: 36,395 | Monstar OST |
| "Goodbye Sadness" (with Eunkwang and Ilhoon) | 2015 | — | —N/a | Sweet, Savage Family OST |
| "After the Play Ends" (연극이 끝난 후) (with Elkie and Heota) | 2016 | — | —N/a | After the Play Ends OST |
| "For You" (with Eunkwang, Ilhoon, Minhyuk) | 2016 | — | —N/a | Cinderella and Four Knights OST |
| "What's On Your Mind?" | 2017 | — | —N/a | My Friend's Love Life OST |
| "Falling" | 2018 | — | —N/a | A Poem a Day OST |
| "In Your Light" | 2018 | — | —N/a | Lovely Horribly OST |
| "The night I miss you" | 2021 | — | —N/a | Her Bucket List OST |
| "Freedom" | 2022 | — | —N/a | Doctor Lawyer OST |
| "Love from a Real Heart" (사랑은 가슴이 시킨다(2023)) | 2023 | 120 | —N/a | It Was Spring OST |
| "Heavenly Fate" (천상연) | 2024 | 6 | —N/a | A Not So Fairy Tale OST |
| "It's Alright" | 2024 | — (Note: "It's Alright" did not chart on the Circle Digital Chart but peaked at 52 on the component Download Chart.) | —N/a | Dare to Love Me OST |
| "True Love" (거짓말의 반대말만 할게요) | 2024 | — (Note: "True Love" did not chart on the Circle Digital Chart but peaked at 9 on the component Download Chart.) | —N/a | Secret Relationship OST |
| "I'll Wait for You" (너를 기다릴게) | 2025 | — (Note: "I'll Wait for You" did not chart on the Circle Digital Chart but peaked at 33 on the component Download Chart.) | —N/a | Buried Hearts OST |
| "Farewell Once Again" (한번 더 이별) | 2025 | 23 | —N/a | Just for Meeting You OST |
| "Alone" (혼자) | 2025 | — (Note: "Alone" did not chart on the Circle Digital Chart but peaked at 52 on the component Download Chart.) | —N/a | To the Moon OST |
| "365 Days" (365일) | 2025 | 66 | —N/a | Even If This Love Disappears from the World Tonight OST |
"—" denotes a recording that did not chart or was not released in that territory

=== Songwriting credits ===
All credits are adapted from the Korea Music Copyright Association, unless cited otherwise.

| Year | Song | Artist(s) | Album | Lyricist | Composer |
|---|---|---|---|---|---|
| 2014 | "Never Ending (Melody)" (끝나지 않을 (Melody)) | BTOB | Beep Beep | Yes | Yes |
| 2015 | "Last Day" | BTOB | I Mean () | Yes | No |
| 2016 | "Killing Me" | BTOB | Remember That | Yes | No |
| 2016 | "Melody Song" (예지앞사) | BTOB | New Men | Yes | No |
| 2017 | "At The End" | Himself | Piece of BTOB Vol. 1 | Yes | Yes |
| 2018 | "Way" | Himself | Mark | Yes | Yes |
| 2018 | "Miss You" (틈) | Himself | Mark | Yes | Yes |
| 2018 | "Shelter" | Himself | Mark | Yes | No |
| 2018 | "Ever" | Himself | Mark | Yes | Yes |
| 2018 | "Gone" | Himself | Mark | Yes | No |
| 2024 | "As Always" | Himself | 1991 | Yes | No |
| 2024 | "33" | Himself | 1991 | Yes | No |

== Filmography ==
=== Television series ===
| Year | Title | Role | Notes | Ref. |
|---|---|---|---|---|
| 2013 | Monstar | Men in Black member | | |
| 2015 | The Village: Achiara's Secret | | Cameo | |

=== Television shows ===
| Year | Title | Role | Notes | Ref. |
|---|---|---|---|---|
| 2015 | King of Masked Singer | Contestant | as Mr. Wifi | |
| 2015 | National Idol Singing Competition | Contestant | with Seo Eun-kwang as Golden and Silver Axe | |
| 2016 | Idol and Family National Singing Competition | Contestant | with Seo Eun-kwang and his brother | |
| 2016 | Law of the Jungle in Mongolia | Cast member | Episode 229–237 | |
| 2017 | Duet Song Festival | Contestant | Episode 43–44 (with Park Soo-jin) | |
| 2020 | Bookae Contest (부캐 선발대회) | Contestant | with Seo Eun-kwang as Golden and Silver Axe | |
| 2024 | Universe League | Director | Team Groove | |

=== Hosting ===
| Year | Title | Notes | Ref. |
|---|---|---|---|
| 2019 | Korean Armed Forces Symphony Orchestra the Peacekeeper of Gang-Won | with Shinee's Key | |
| 2020 | All That Cube | Episode 7–16 | |
| 2024 | When I Opened My Eyes (눈떠보니 OOO) | with Cho Sae-ho | |
| 2025 | Salon de Idol | with Key | |
| 2025 | Idol Star Athletics Championships (ISAC) | with Jun Hyun Moo, Lee Eun Ji, and Jonathan | |

=== Web shows ===
| Year | Title | Role | Notes | Ref. |
|---|---|---|---|---|
| 2022–2025 | Jeongwaja (Changing Majors) | Host | Season 1–5 | |
| 2022 | Inssa Oppa S7 | Host | with Seo Eun-kwang | |
| 2023 | Lotri Night | Host | | |
| 2025 | Singing for You (너를 위해 부른다) | Director | | |
| 2025–2026 | Ttorora | Cast | with Solar and Hyungwon | |

== Live performances and tours ==
=== Musical stages ===
| Year | Title | Role | Ref. |
|---|---|---|---|
| 2017 | Boys Over Flowers | Tsukasa Doumyouji | |
| 2017 | Napoleon | Lucien | |
| 2017 | Edgar Allan Poe | Edgar Allan Poe | |
| 2018 | Dogfight | Birdlace | |
| 2018 | Iron Mask | Louis XIV | |
| 2021 | The Last Empress | Hong Gye-Hoon | |
| 2021 | Marie Antoinette | Count Axel von Fersen | |
| 2021 | Darwin Young's Origin of Evil | Darwin Young | |
| 2022 | Mata Hari | Armand | |
| 2023 | Memphis | Huey | |
| 2023–2024 | Winter Traveler | Han Min-woo | |
| 2025 | Memphis | Huey | |

=== Solo concerts ===
| Year | Date | Title | Notes | Venue | Ref. |
|---|---|---|---|---|---|
| 2019 | Jan 4-6 | Space | Seoul | Yes24 Live Hall | |
| 2024 | Nov 30 – Dec 1 | The Wayfarer | Seoul | KBS Arena | |
| 2024 | Dec 7-8 | The Wayfarer | Gwangju | Gwangju Women's University Universaide Gymnasium | |
| 2024 | Dec 14-15 | The Wayfarer | Busan | KBS Busan Broadcasting Station | |
| 2024 | Dec 21-22 | The Wayfarer | Daegu | EXCO 5F Convention Hall | |
| 2024 | Dec 28-29 | The Wayfarer | Suwon | Suwon Gymnasium | |
| 2025 | Jan 4-5 | The Wayfarer | Cheongju | Cheongju University Seokwoo Cultural Gymnasium | |
| 2025 | Feb 2 | The Wayfarer | Taipei | Zepp New Taipei | |
| 2025 | Feb 7-9 | The Wayfarer | Seoul (ENCORE) | SK Olympic Handball Stadium | |
| 2025 | Mar 22 | The Wayfarer | Manila | SM NORTH EDSA, SKYDOME | |
| 2025 | Apr 5 | The Wayfarer | Bangkok | CENTERPOINT STUDIO LASALLE | |
| 2025 | Nov 7-9 | EndAnd | Seoul | Jangchung Arena | |
| 2025 | Nov 29-30 | EndAnd | Incheon | Songdo Convensia | |
| 2025 | Dec 6-7 | EndAnd | Daejeon | Daejeon Convention Center, DCC 2 | |
| 2025 | Dec 13-14 | EndAnd | Gwangju | Gwangju Women's University Universaide Gymnasium | |
| 2026 | Jan 3-4 | EndAnd | Daegu | EXCO 5F Convention Hall | |
| 2026 | Jan 17-18 | EndAnd | Busan | BEXCO Auditorium | |
| 2026 | Jan 24-25 | EndAnd | Suwon | Suwon Convention Center | |

=== Special concerts ===
| Year | Date | Title | Venue | Ref. |
|---|---|---|---|---|
| 2021 | Sept 24 | Museezn Concert 2021 | Lotte Concert Hall | |
| 2024 | July 25–26 | 2024 LOTTE OST Festival | Lotte Concert Hall | |

== Awards and nominations ==
Name of the award ceremony, year presented, award category, nominee(s) of the award, and the result of the nomination
| Award ceremony | Year | Category | Nominee / Work | Result | Ref. |
|---|---|---|---|---|---|
| Brand of the Year Awards (Note: It is a large-scale brand award that selects and awards the best brands that shined in the year through direct consumer voting.) | 2023 | Web Entertainment MC | Himself | Won | |
| Korea First Brand Awards (Note: Hosted by the Korea Consumer Brand Committee and the Korea Consumer Forum, the Korea First Brand Awards bases its winners on a nationwide South Korean survey.) | 2025 | Male Vocal | Himself | Won | |
| Korea First Brand Awards | 2025 | Web Variety MC | Himself | Won | |
| Korea First Brand Awards | 2026 | Men's Vocal Category | Himself | Won | |
| MAMA Awards | 2024 | Song of the Year | "Heavenly Fate" | Longlisted | |
| MAMA Awards | 2024 | Best OST | "Heavenly Fate" | Nominated | |
| Melon Music Awards | 2024 | Song of the Year | "Heavenly Fate" | Nominated | |
| Melon Music Awards | 2024 | Best Male Solo | Himself | Nominated | |
