= Remember That (EP) =

- Cover of Remember That

EP by BTOB
- Released: March 28, 2016
- Recorded: 2016
- Genre: K-pop; ballad; soul; R&B
- Length: 25:56
- Language: Korean
- Label: Cube Entertainment; Universal Music Group

BTOB chronology
I Mean (2015)	Remember That (2016)	New Men (2016)

Singles from Remember That
- 1. "Remember That" Released: March 28, 2016

Music videos
- "봄날의 기억(Remember that)" on YouTube

Remember That is the eighth EP of the South Korean boy group, BTOB. It was released on March 28, 2016. It is also the third installment to the BTOB's ballad trilogy, promoting the lead single "Remember That". BTOB's own members participated in the production of all the songs in this album.

== Release ==
On March 17, Cube Entertainment announced that BTOB will be making a comeback on March 28 with its 8th Mini Album "Remember That". Photo and video teasers for the album were released from March 20–26.

The tracks "Remember That" and "So Pretty" were performed to fans beforehand on BTOB's encore concert Born to Beat Time that was held on March 27–28. Before the official comeback, BTOB appeared on the live broadcasting app "V App" in which they held a special event for "Remember That".

== Promotion ==
The group made their first official comeback stage on March 31 at Mnet's M Countdown, performing the tracks "Remember That" and "So Pretty". They received their first music show trophy for this album on MBC Music's Show Champion. They received their 2nd, and 3rd trophies on Mnet's M Countdown, and KBS's Music Bank which also marks their first public music broadcast win since 1480 days of debut.

== Music video ==
On March 28, they released the four-minute music video for "Remember That" on Naver's V app and also on their official YouTube channel. The music video features a drama-style format that is starred by member Lee Minhyuk and actress Jo Bo-ah. It shows a man reminiscing his memories with his ex-lover during spring time.

== Track list ==
※ Track in bold is the title track in the album.

No.	Title	Lyrics	Music	Arrangement	Length
1.	"Killing Me"	Lim Hyun-sik, Lee Chang-sub	Lim Hyun-sik, Simon Hassle, Benjamin Beard	Lim Hyun-sik, Simon Hassle, Benjamin Beard	3:34
2.	"그려본다 (내가 그린 그림)" (Drawing (The Picture I Drew))	77어린이	Breadbeat, Shin-hyo, Wonderkid	Breadbeat, Shin-hyo, Wonderkid	4:16
3.	"**봄날의 기억**" (Remember That)	Jo Sung-ho, FERDY	Jo Sung-ho, FERDY	Jo Sung-ho, FERDY	4:09
4.	"Anymore"	Lim Hyun-sik	Seo Jae-woo, Lee Brian D	Seo Jae-woo, Lee Brian D	3:43
5.	"So Pretty"	Seo Jae-woo, Seo Yong-bae, Jung Il-hoon	Seo Jaewoo, Seo Yong-bae	Seo Jaewoo, Seo Yong-bae	3:21
6.	"너 같아서" (Because Like You)	Jeon Da-woon, Big Ssancho	Jeon Da-woon, Big Ssancho	Jeon Da-woon, Big Ssancho	3:55
7.	"자리비움" (Empty Space)	Jung Il-hoon, IL	Jung Il-hoon, IL	Jung Il-hoon, IL	2:58
Total length:					25:56

== Chart performance ==
Title	Peak positions	Sales
Title	KOR Gaon	Sales
"Remember That"	1	KOR: 49,162 +

== Music program wins ==
Program	Date	Episode
Show Champion (MBC Music)	April 6	181
M Countdown (Mnet)	April 7	468
Music Bank (KBS)	April 8	831
