= Inside (EP) =

- Digital cover and streaming cover

EP by BtoB 4U
- Released: November 16, 2020
- Genre: K-pop
- Length: 16:49
- Language: Korean
- Label: Cube; Universal; U-Cube

Singles from Inside
- 1. "Show Your Love" Released: November 16, 2020

Inside is the debut extended play by South Korean boy group BtoB's second sub-unit BtoB 4U. BtoB 4U is a new unit consisting of BtoB's Eunkwang, Minhyuk, Changsub and Peniel, and is expected to capture global fans through another charm in BtoB. The EP was released on November 16, 2020, through Cube Entertainment.

Inside was described as it captures both freshness and completeness with a different feeling from BtoB. It features five tracks including the lead single "Show Your Love". The physical version is available in two versions: "In" and "Side".

== Background ==
On October 27, 2020, Cube Entertainment released a video informing BtoB's new unit name through its official SNS channel. In the released video, Eunkwang, Minhyuk, Changsub and Peniel gave a welcome greeting to the fandom Melody, announcing the new unit name BtoB 4U, and announcing their active activities. BtoB 4U is a unit name selected after a public survey from their fandom Melody. The name has a double meaning of 'For you' and '4 members united'. On October 30, Cube officially announced their debut date with the album name and released an artwork teaser image of a vintage door where sunlight and clouds on it.

"You’ll be able to see all four of our reversal charms in this album. The kind of reversal charm where it includes a focus on humor in the track. Even when we remain the color of full BTOB, but we included the energy that only four of us have, 2 vocalist, 2 rappers, the balance make the stage more harmonious

— Eunkwang, Daily Sports

During the group's debut showcase, Changsub confessed that "After the military discharge, I devoted myself to this album. I have been working as a new unit on my first comeback after the military service, so I am half nervous and half excited." Minhyuk also added, "I'm trying to do it in a long time, so I'm very nervous. Many people have been interested and I think I should do well. Above all, I'm excited to be with the members."

== Composition ==
The album contains various genres of songs from moombahton to R&B, punk rock and modern rock ballad. The opening track and title song "Show Your Love" is a moombahton dance-pop track with a rhythmic rhythm and a hopeful message. Composed by BtoB member Hyunsik before enlisting in the military. He commented, "There is no greater power than love in our universe. It is time to show love. Let us overcome together with love." The second track, "Tension" is composed by earattack, Jimmy, eniac and Jwa Young Kim. The song is described as an ear-pleasing R&B track led by a simple, addictive acoustic guitar riff with a trendy arrangement along with a moderate beat and slick synth. Under the name of tension, the song expresses the sparks between a man and a woman with a sexy vibe. In this song, Minhyuk who is a rapper participated in the vocals instead of rapping. He stated, "because it's a song that's important in terms of the atmosphere and rhythm."

The third track, "Bull's Eye" is composed by member Minhyuk and Aftrshok, Joseph k and Geist Way. It is a bouncy funk rock dance track with a powerful sound that induces an inner dance from the beginning till the end. The song matches with the personalities of the members who are famous for their talents and energy, individual charms and capabilities are revealed boundlessly that can feel the energetic identity of BtoB 4U. Minhyuk explained, "Adding the cheerfulness of BtoB only in "Bull's eye" and the strength of BtoB's vocal in "Missing You" (그리워하다). When we recorded this song, is a little difficult as it's a style we haven't tried before. The fourth track, "Mirage" is a moombahton track with a calm vibe that blends the lonesome repetitive guitar loop with the emotional vocals. The melody harmonies with the emptiness felt in the pre-chorus conveying the dramatic emotion of the song as the song is expressed as a mirage in the desert and allures another charm of the group. The closing track, "Alone" is a modern rock track and the only ballad song in the album. It starts with the voices of the four BtoB 4U members and lonesome guitar. As the song reaches its climax, the piano creates an emotional and sad atmosphere. Minhyuk thinks the song fits between fall and winter.

== Artwork and packaging ==
BtoB 4U released two album versions for Inside. In "In" version, the group showed their luxurious visual with chic and serious charm and poses with a black jacket and shirt under a dark turquoise background. In "Side" version, the members shows their unique charms wearing casual and colourful outfits and the use of different props such as smiley balloons, toy airplanes, dinosaur dolls, popcorn, and flower-shaped sunglasses different from the first concept image released.

The EP has a paper book cover, booklet, lyric paper, CD, mini-poster, postcard with message on the card, sticker, photo card and poster. During a YouTube live stream on November 16, Eunkwang revealed that "During the jacket filming, they were told to design the CDs. I put a lot of effort into drawing. About the stickers in the album, they didn’t tell us, they just told us to take 5 photos. So we took them cutely and humorously."

== Critical reception ==
Choo Seung-Hyun of the Seoul Economic Daily wrote in his review "Unlike many groups that usually show 180 degrees of different concepts while forming units, BtoB emphasized its unique pleasant and positive energy. In this album, the message to brighten the atmosphere of society, which was contacted with the corona virus infection (Corona 19), gave healing. The healing concept is BtoB's greatest strength and weapon."

== Commercial performance ==
On the chart issue dated November 15–21, 2020, the album debuted and charted at number 3 on the Gaon Album Chart and number 4 on the Gaon Retail Album with 19,269 units. They made their debut on Gaon Social Chart, charting at number 14. In Japan, Inside debuted at number 74 on Billboard Japan Hot Albums.

== Promotion ==
On November 2, 2020, Cube released a time table for BtoB 4U's first extended play through their official homepage and SNS, which shows the group's promotion schedule beginning November 4 until their first online concert, 2021 BtoB 4U Online Concert [INSIDE] on January 23, 2021. On November 6 and 9, Cube released a concept video and a total of 10 concept images, 8 photos per member and 2 group photos. On November 12 and 13, BtoB 4U released individual music video teasers, followed by the next day, a group music video teaser.

On November 16, the group held an online media showcase for the release of Inside at the YES24 Live Hall in Gwangjin-gu, Seoul, hosted by broadcaster Ha Ji-young.

== Track listing ==
The following tracklist was adapted from the officially released tracklist image.

Inside track listing
No.	Title	Lyrics	Music	Arrangement	Length
1.	"Show Your Love"	Hyunsik; EDEN; Minhyuk (HUTA); Peniel	Hyunsik; EDEN; Ollounder; Leez	Hyunsik; EDEN; Ollounder; Leez	3:11
2.	"Tension"	earattack; Peniel	earattack; Jimmy; eniac; Jwa Young Kim (김좌영)	earattack; eniac; Jwa Young Kim (김좌영)	3:10
3.	"Bull's Eye"	Minhyuk (HUTA); Peniel	Minhyuk (HUTA); AFTRSHOK; joseph k; GEIST WAY	AFTRSHOK; joseph k; GEIST WAY	3:17
4.	"Mirage" (신기루)	B.O. (비오); Jae Woo Seo (서재우); Yong Bae Seo (서용배); BreadBeat; Minhyuk (HUTA); Peniel	Jae Woo Seo; Yong Bae Seo; BreadBeat; B.O	Jae Woo Seo; Yong Bae Seo; BreadBeat	3:06
5.	"Alone" (그대로예요; Geudaeroyeyo [lit. "Just Like That"])	Minhyuk (HUTA); Peniel	Minhyuk (HUTA); AFTRSHOK; GEIST WAY	AFTRSHOK; GEIST WAY	4:05
Total length:					16:49

== Charts ==
Weekly sales chart performance for Inside
Chart (2020)	Peak position
Japanese Albums (Oricon)	43
Japan Hot Albums (Billboard Japan)	74
Japan Download Albums (Billboard Japan)	23
South Korean Albums (Gaon)	3

Monthly sales chart performance for Inside
Chart (2020)	Peak position
South Korean Albums (Gaon)	18

Sales chart performance for singles from Inside
Song	Chart (2020)	Peak position
"Show Your Love"	South Korea (Gaon Digital)	72
"Show Your Love"	South Korea (Gaon Download)	10
"Show Your Love"	South Korea (Gaon Streaming)	118
"Show Your Love"	South Korea (K-pop Hot 100)	72

== Certification and sales ==
Region	Certification	Certified units/sales
Japan	—	1,566
South Korea	—	62,869

== Release history ==
Release formats for Inside
Region	Date	Format	Distributor	Ref.
South Korea	November 16, 2020	CD, digital download, streaming	Cube; Kakao M; Universal Music	
Various	November 16, 2020	CD, digital download, streaming	Cube; Kakao M; Universal Music	
