= Show Your Love (BtoB 4U song) =

2020 single by BtoB 4U

- Japanese version digital cover

Single by BtoB 4U

from the album Inside
- Released: November 16, 2020
- Studio: Cube Studio
- Genre: K-pop; moombahton; dance
- Length: 3:11
- Label: Cube; Universal Music
- Songwriters: Hyunsik; EDEN; Minhyuk (HUTA); Peniel
- Producers: Hyunsik; EDEN; Ollaunder; Leez

Music video
- "Show Your Love" on YouTube

"Show Your Love" is a song recorded by South Korean boy group BtoB 4U, released on November 16, 2020, by Cube Entertainment as the lead single of the group's first extended play Inside.

"Show Your Love" is a moombahton dance song that contains a hopeful message to live and love each other even in difficult times. BtoB member Hyunsik, who created numerous BtoB's hit songs such as "Missing You", "Only One for Me", and "Beautiful Pain" participated in the lyrics, composition, and arrangement alongside his long-time collaborator Eden. BtoB member Minhyuk and Peniel also participated in the writing. An accompanying music video for the song was uploaded onto BtoB's YouTube channel simultaneously with the single's release. Upon release, the music video broke their own record amassing 1 million views in 8 hours and 3.4 million views in 24 hours.

BtoB 4U gained their first ever music show on SBS MTV's The Show, 8 days after debut.

A Japanese version of the song was released on December 2, 2020.

== Background ==
"Show Your Love" is a song written by member Hyunsik before his enlistment and conveys a message of hope about loving one another during difficult times. Minhyuk explained why they chose Hyunsik's song as the title track, saying, "This is the first time our members are promoting together in two years. As we were working hard, we received many songs of various styles but decided on "Show Your Love". It shined on its own and wasn't special just because it was our member's song. We just thought it was a great song that fit well with our difficult situation now." Eunkwang continued, "The reason you must listen to our song is that it fits well with the end of year. The lyrics is suitable during this period, the heart of wanting to comfort many is huge. We prepare the heart of wanting to comfort and give strength to people. So I want to boldly said that you must listen to BtoB 4U". During their debut showcase, Changsub introduced its point choreography, 'Overcome COVID-19' where he sings, "Why is the world more painful than beautiful" (이 세상은 왜 아름답기보단 아프기만 한지) while demonstrating the move showing Corona-19 - wearing mask - and how people wanting to take their masks off hoping that it would ending soon.

== Critical reception ==
Choo Seung-Hyun of the Seoul Economic Daily affirmed that "Show Your Love" "reflected the times with a hopeful message to live and love each other even in difficult times. BtoB's song, there is no greater power than love, is suitable for those who are struggling with Corona 19. He concluded positively, saying that "Recently, many singers are releasing healing songs like this, but BtoB's unique pleasant energy, which has returned after a long time, makes me feel more delighted.

== Commercial performance ==
After one day of tracking, the song charted on South Korea's major domestic music sites such as Bugs 2nd, Genie 4th, Melon 9th, and all songs on the album managed to chart-in. The song debuted at number 72 on the Billboard K-pop Hot 100, and Gaon Digital Chart with Gaon index of 7,402,210, Additionally, the song debuted at number 10 on the Download chart, number 118 on the Streaming chart, and number 7 on BGM chart for the 47th week of 2020.

== Track listing ==
- Download and streaming
1. "Show Your Love" – 3:11
- Digital single
1. "Show Your Love" (Japanese Ver.) – 3:11

== Credits and personnel ==
Credits are adapted from Melon.

- BtoB 4U – vocals
- Hyunsik – producing, songwriting
- Ollounder – producing, audio engineer, bass, drum, piano, synthesizer
- LEEZ – producing, audio engineer
- EDEN – producing, songwriting, piano, synthesizer
- Minhyuk (HUTA) – songwriting
- Peniel – songwriting
- Yocke – Japanese lyrics
- Changsub – Background vocal
- Shin Jae-bin (Cube Studio) – Record engineering
- Choi Ye-ji (Cube Studio) – Assistant record engineering
- Jung Eun-kyung (Ingrid Studio) – Digital music editor
- Koo Jong-pil (KLANG Studio) – Mixing engineer
- Jung Yu-ra (KLANG Studio) – Assistant mixing engineer
- Kwon Nam-woo (821 Sound mastering) – Mastering engineer

== Live performance ==
On November 16, BtoB 4U presented two stages with completely different atmospheres, "Show Your Love" and "Mirage" on KakaoTV Comeback Show Mu:Talk Live. On November 18, the group performed "Show Your Love" and "Bull's Eye" on Naver Now BTOB NOW: Our Concert. On November 30, they are the third act performing "Alone" and "Show Your Love" on Naver Now Party B.

== Promotion ==
On November 6, the global entertainment platform Makestar opened the video call event page from November 3–13 for a special meeting between BtoB 4U and global fans. The group also partnered up with MyMusicTaste and Richning. On November 9, the group recorded the MBC Every 1 variety show Weekly Idol held at MBC Dream Center.

BtoB 4U started off their promotions by appearing on KakaoTV Comeback Show Mu:Talk Live on November 16. On November 18, Btob 4U appeared on Gems' Square live, and Kang Han-na's Volume Up. On November 19, they appeared as guest on SBS Power FM Cultwo Show, and #TwitterBlueroom Live Q&A. On November 22, the group held a video call fan signing event at a cafe in Gayang-dong, Seoul. On November 25, BtoB 4U's episode 487 of Weekly Idol was aired. The following day, they appeared on SBS Power FM Lee Jun's Youngstreet. On December 2, Minhyuk appeared as guest on Naver Now Vogue Ship Show, and SBS Power FM Park So-hyun's Lovegame.

The group started promoting "Show Your Love" on music shows on November 18. They first performed the song on MBC Music's Show Champion. This was followed by performances on KBS's Music Bank, SBS's Inkigayo, and SBS MTV's The Show. On November 29, they had their last stage on Inkigayo.

On November 17, BtoB 4U released a cheering method video which includes chords, singing voices, chorus, rap, and third-degree notes. BtoB's cheering method was famous for being difficult and attracted attention. In "Missing You" cheering method released in 2017, there were chords and choruses, and a whole cheering method was put in the chorus. In addition, in the song "Only One for Me" released on June 18, 2018, the cheering method took 1 minute and 5 seconds for a total of 3 minutes and 46 seconds.

On November 30, BtoB 4U underwent COVID-19 testing due to coming in contact with COVID-19 on November 28 and 29. The group and their staff members tested negative and the group resumed their activities on December 2.

== Music video ==
An accompanying music video for "Show Your Love" was uploaded on 1theK and BtoB's official YouTube channel on November 16, 2020, at 6:00 pm KST. It was choreographed by several dancers from Born Black, Aura and Auspicious, while being directed by director Jang Jae-hyuk, who had previously directed music videos of top stars such as Rain, TVXQ, Girls' Generation, Shinee, Park Hyo-shin. The music video features four members with their own stories in different spaces. The stories unfolded in different spaces and presented a movie-like music video. First, Eunkwang is Lucien Carr (Dane DeHaan) who shares art and connections in the movie Kill Your Darlings, Minhyuk as Romeo Montague (Leonardo DiCaprio), who loves passionately in Romeo + Juliet, Changsub is lacking in love in Days of Being Wild as Yuddy (Leslie Cheung), and Peniel transformed into a youth Mark Renton (Ewan McGregor) wandering in Trainspotting. In the video, Minhyuk was standing alone in a large aquarium lit by lights and a space full of candles after intense eye contact with the camera. In the alleys, messy rooms, and dark basement spaces, Peniel showed off his intense eyes and rough masculinity. Eunkwang in a decorated with antique furniture and piano, while Changsub in a room full of vintage objects thinking and dancing freely. The music video showed the meaning "to spread humanity". It did not simply express love between men and women, but showed various forms of love, such as a romantic relationship between two men, and youth wandering due to lack of love.

The music video surpassed 1 million views in 8 hours and 3.4 million views in 24 hours, breaking its own record. On the chart issue dated November 15–21, 2020, "Show Your Love" charted at number 9 on K-Pop radar chart with 11.4 million views.

On November 19, a music clip for the song was released.

On November 20, a lyric video for the song was released.

On December 2, a Japanese lyric video for the song was released.

== Accolades ==
Music program award
Program	Network	Date	Ref.
The Show	SBS MTV	November 24, 2020	

Year-end lists
Critic/Publication	List	Rank	Ref.
Tidal	K-Pop: Best of 2020	96	

== Charts ==
=== Weekly charts ===
Chart (2020)	Peak position
South Korea (Gaon Digital)	72
South Korea (Gaon Download)	10
South Korea (Gaon Streaming)	118
South Korea (K-pop Hot 100)	72

== Release history ==
Region	Date	Format	Distributor
Various	November 16, 2020	Digital download; streaming	Cube; Kakao M; U-Cube
