= Lee Min-hyuk (rapper, born 1990) =

South Korean rapper (born 1990)

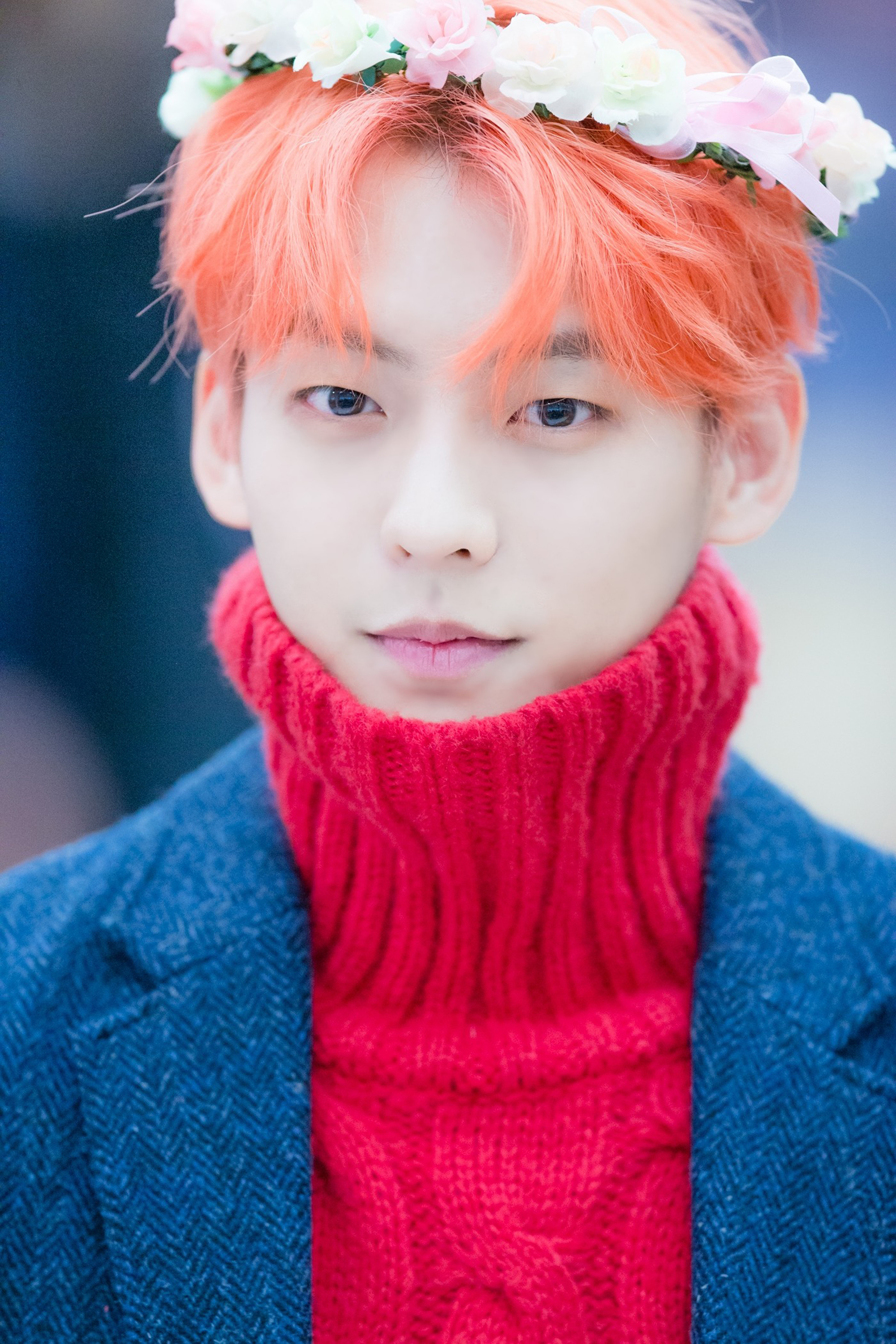
- Lee at a fansign in November 2016
- Born: November 29, 1990 (age 35); Seoul, South Korea
- Occupations: Rapper; singer; songwriter; music producer; actor; presenter; DJ
- Musical career
- Also known as: Huta
- Genres: K-pop; hip hop
- Instrument: Vocals
- Years active: 2012–present
- Labels: Cube; BtoB Company
- Website: btobofficial.com

Korean name
- Hangul: 이민혁
- Hanja: 李旼赫
- RR: I Minhyeok
- MR: I Minhyŏk

Signature
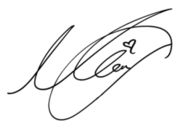

Lee Min-hyuk (Korean: 이민혁; born November 29, 1990), commonly known as Minhyuk or Huta, is a South Korean rapper, singer, songwriter, actor, and presenter. He is a member of the South Korean boy group BtoB. He has appeared in multiple supporting roles in television series such as A New Leaf and Sweet, Savage Family.

== Biography ==
Lee Minhyuk was born on November 29, 1990, in Seoul, South Korea. He graduated from Kwangsung High School and attended Dankook University, where he majored in film studies and continued to take his master's degree at Inha University majoring in culture management.

== Career ==
=== Pre-debut ===
Prior to debuting in BtoB, Lee Min-hyuk had been active as an underground music artist, going by the moniker 'Huta'. In 2008–2009, alongside other underground artists Block B's Zico (then Nacseo) and Park Kyung (then Holke), they released a mixtape track "Nar.BINO" (여전히) .

He was also the lead for the cancelled tv series SF X Fantasy Rayforce.

Lee received training for 7 months, but as a musical student, he already had solid basic skills. Lee, together with fellow members of BtoB, Seo Eunkwang, Im Hyunsik, Jung Ilhoon, and a former Cube BtoB trainee Lee Minwoo (now ex C-Clown member T.K) acted in the JTBC show, I Live in Cheongdam-dong as a member of the fictional boy group 'Invincible Chungdam No. 5', before officially debuting as BtoB.

On March 20, 2012, Lee was cast as the MC for SBS MTV's The Show along with Yook Sung-jae, a future member of BtoB.

=== BtoB ===
Lee made his debut as a member of boy-group BtoB in 2012. The group made their official debut on March 21, 2012, on M! Countdown.

On October 27, 2020, Cube announced that the currently active members of BtoB have formed a unit called BtoB 4U consisting Eunkwang, Minhyuk, Changsub and Peniel. The unit debuted on November 16 with their first mini-album, Inside and title track "Show Your Love".

=== Solo activities ===
In 2012, Lee was cast in a variety show, tvN's The Romantic & Idol 2. He also had multiple appearances since 2013 on Let's Go! Dream Team Season 2.

On January 22, 2013, he starred in the MBC variety and sitcom Reckless Family 2. In May, he made a guest appearance in the Mnet musical TV series Monstar, playing the role of Malo, a member of the group Man In Black. On September 4, he starred in tvN's Fantastic Tower, playing the male protagonist Min Ho who died 15 years ago but came back to life.

In 2014, he received supporting roles in the dramas A New Leaf and the idol special of Love & War 2.

In 2015, joined the cast of Sweet, Savage Family. He also starred as a lead in the web-drama Nightmare Teacher.

Lee featured as a rapper under the stage name Huta in Postmen's "I'm OK", released on July 14, 2015.

Lee is also known for his athletics abilities, as he was crowned as the MVP of the 2014 Idol Star Athletics Championships, where his group, Team B, won. Lee won three gold medals and one silver medal.

Lee released the self-produced "Purple Rain" featuring Cheeze as part of BTOB's solo project series, Piece of BTOB on August 10, 2017. Later in the year on December 6, Childlike (유치해도), self-produced by Lee, was released.

In 2018, Lee made his solo debut in Japan, with his first Japanese EP, Summer Diary, released on July 25 with a total of five tracks.

In January 2019, Lee's solo Korean debut was announced with an all self-composed album, Hutazone. The album contains a total of eleven songs, including a Korean version of "All Day", "It Must Have Been A Dream" and "You Too? Me Too!", featuring Yook Sungjae and Jeon So-yeon, respectively. He held his first solo concert, Hutazone: Two Night in February 2019 at the Yes24 Live Hall in Gwangjin District, Seoul.

Lee made his silver screen debut in the historical action film, The Swordsman, as Gyeom Sa-bok.

Since November 1, 2021, 'KBS COOL FM', a Korean radio channel, has been hosting a radio program called 'BTOB's Kiss the Radio' at 10 p.m. every night.

On November 5, 2021, Lee released the digital single "Good Night".

On June 27, 2022, Lee released his second studio album, Boom.

In November 2023, BtoB, including Lee, departed Cube Entertainment.

In February 2024, BtoB announced the establishment of BtoB Company for the group activities and for Lee's solo activities.

== Personal life ==
=== Military service ===
Lee enlisted as a conscripted police officer on February 7, 2019. He was discharged on September 12, 2020.

=== Contracting with COVID-19 infection ===
Tedros Adhanom Ghebreyesus
(@DrTedros)
tweeted:

I'm glad that you've been discharged from the hospital, @btob2mh! Wishing you a speedy and full recovery.Thank you for sharing your experience & reminding @OFFICIALBTOB fans MELODY to take good care of themselves & how to prevent the spread of #COVID19.

August 1, 2021

South Korean news outlet Osen reported on July 14, 2021, Lee has undergone COVID-19 testing (rapid antigen and PCR test) after his vocal teacher tested positive for the virus. Fortunately, his results came negative, but he still went into self-quarantine as a precautionary measure following government guidelines. During his quarantine, Lee showed symptoms of cough and fever on the 16th, and was confirmed positive for the virus on July 17. On July 30, he communicated with his fans through an Instagram live broadcast he revealed he suffered with high temperature, severe cough, pneumonia, headache, loss sense of smell and weight loss of four to five kilograms. "My temperature kept rising from 39 to 40 degrees Celsius [...] For about seven to eight days, starting from the day my symptoms first appeared, my temperature stayed 39 degrees for that entire week. They kept giving me fever reducers at the hospital. Still, even with the fever reducers, the lowest my temperature ever got was 38.3 degrees or 38.5 degrees Celsius. A few days later, Tedros Adhanom, the Director-General of the World Health Organization took to Twitter to share Lee's experience with the virus.

== Discography ==
=== Studio albums ===
List of studio albums, with selected chart positions and sales
Title	Album details	Peak chart positions	Sales
Title	Album details	KOR	Sales
Hutazone	Released: January 15, 2019; Label: Cube Entertainment, Kakao M; Formats: CD, digital download; Track listing: 1. "Hutazone"; 2. "Ya"; 3. "Hang Out" (너도? 나도!) (feat. Jeon So-yeon of (G)I-dle); 4. "Lonely" (아무렇지 않은 척); 5. "Day Dream" (꿈인가 봐요) (feat. Yook Sung-jae of BtoB); 6. "Falling Blossoms" (낙화(落花)) (Interlude); 7. "Fallin'"; 8. "All Day" (Korean ver.); 9. "Purple Rain" (feat. Cheeze); 10. "Tonight (With Melody)" (오늘 밤에 (With Melody)); 11. "Waiting for You"	3	KOR: 37,768
Boom	Released: June 27, 2022; Label: Cube Entertainment, Kakao Entertainment; Formats: CD, digital download; Track listing: 1. "I'm Rare"; 2. "Boom"; 3. "Shadow"; 4. "Dear My Spring" (넌 나의 봄이야); 5. "Secretly" (그대가 모르게); 6. "Is It Love?" (사랑일까요) (Duet with Lee Chang-sub of BtoB); 7. "Firework" (위험해); 8. "Real Game (Like Messi)"; 9. "Us Together" (우리 함께 걸어요); 10. "Red Wine"; 11. "Stay" (기다리고 있어); 12. "Hello and Bye" (끝 눈)	4	KOR: 36,524

=== Extended plays ===
Title	Album details	Peak chart positions	Sales
Title	Album details	KOR	Sales
Summer Diary	Released: July 25, 2018 (JPN); Label: Cube Entertainment Japan; Formats: CD, digital download; Track listing: 1. "Stay"; 2. "Summer Diary" (夏の日記); 3. "All Day"; 4. "Otsukisama e" (お月様へ) (Dear Moon); 5. "About Time" (solo ver.)	—	—
Hook	Released: July 21, 2025 (KOR); Label: BtoB Company; Formats: CD, digital download; Track listing: 1. "V"; 2. "Bora"; 3. "Wet"; 4. "Rosy"; 5. "XOXO"; 6. "Colorful"; 7. "Break Free"	10	KOR: 29,298

=== Singles ===
Title	Year	Peak chart positions	Sales	Album
Title	Year	KOR	Sales	Album
As lead artist
"Purple Rain" (feat. Cheeze)	2017	51	—N/a	Hutazone
"YA"	2019	140	—N/a	Hutazone
"Good Night" (알아)	2021	—	—N/a	Non-album single
"Boom"	2022	114	—N/a	Boom
"Bora"	2025	—	—N/a	Hook
"Icy & Spicy"	2026	—	—N/a	Temperature
Collaborations
"Mermaid" (with Ilhoon, Peniel, Jang Yeeun, Soyeon, and Wooseok)	2018	—	—N/a	One
"Sorry" (미안해) (with Eunkwang and Changsub)	2019	96	—N/a	Non-album single
As featured artist
"I'm OK" (Postmen feat. Huta)	2015	—	KOR: 19,564	I'm OK
"2Limes" (Inoran feat. Minhyuk, Peniel, Ilhoon)	2015	—	—N/a	Beautiful Now
"It's You To The Bone" (Song Yuvin feat. Huta)	2016	—	—N/a	Non-album single
"Shall We Drink" (Moon Myung Jin feat. Minhyuk)	2017	—	—N/a	Non-album single
"Incorrect Answer" (Kim Na-young feat. Minhyuk)	2018	80	—N/a	Non-album single
"Hello" (CherryB feat. Minhyuk)	2021	—	—N/a	Non-album single
"Ivitation" (Nam You Joung feat. Minhyuk)	2026	—	—N/a	
Soundtrack appearances
"Past Days" (with Junhyung, Ha Yeon-soo, Changsub, Hyunsik, Sungjae)	2013	56	KOR: 87,730	Monstar OST
"After Time Passes" (with Junhyung, Changsub, Hyunsik, Sungjae)	2013	32	KOR: 125,359	Monstar OST
"First Love" (with Junhyung, Changsub, Hyunsik, Sungjae)	2013	61	KOR: 36,395	Monstar OST
"No" (with Minah)	2015	—	—N/a	Sweet, Savage Family OST
"After the Show Ends" (with Changsub, Elkie)	2016	—	—N/a	After the Show Ends OST
"For You" (with Changsub, Eunkwang, Ilhoon)	2016	—	—N/a	Cinderella with Four Knights OST
"The Day"	2020	—	—N/a	Good Casting OST
"Time Moves Slow"	2023	—	—N/a	Race OST
"In The Glow Of Us"	2024	—	—N/a	Dear Hyeri OST
"—" denotes releases that did not chart or were not released in that region.

== Production credits ==
=== Songs written and produced for other artists ===
Year	Album	Artist	Song	Lyrics		Music	
Year	Album	Artist	Song	Credited	With	Credited	With
2018	Autumn Project Single	Kim Sang Gyun (JBJ), Sohee (Elris)	"Childish (유치해도)"	Yes	—N/a	Yes	—
2019	Special Digital Single	Eunkwang, Minhyuk and Changsub	"Sorry (미안해)"	Yes	—	Yes	Yang Seungwook, Kkannu

== Filmography ==
=== Film ===
Year	Title	Role	Notes	Ref.
2017	Halfway	Yonu	KitKat micro film	
2020	The Swordsman	Gyeom Sa-bok		
2022	Urban Myths	Jae-hoon	Segment: "Ghost Marriage"	

=== Television series ===
Year	Title	Role	Notes	Ref.
2013	Reckless Family 2	Himself		
2013	Fantastic Tower	Min-ho	Episode 8, Part 1	
2014	Love and War 2: Her Choice	Hyun-woo	Idol Special	
2014	A New Leaf	Lee Ji-hyeok		
2014	The Heirs	Himself	Cameo (episode 4)	
2015	Sweet, Savage Family	Yoon Sung-min		
2016	After the Show Ends	Ma Rok-hee		
2018	Dae Jang Geum Is Watching	Min-hyuk		

=== Web series ===
Year	Title	Role	Ref.
2016	Nightmare Teacher	Seo Sang-woo	
2017	Unexpected Heroes	Bae Joon-young	
2018	Number Six	Won Tak	

=== Television shows ===
Year	Title	Role	Notes	Ref.
2012	The Show	MCs together	with member Sungjae	
2012	The Romantic & Idol Season 2	He was paired	with Jewelry's Yewon	
2016	Oh My God Tip	Himself	with Twice's Nayeon	
2018	Law of the Jungle in Last Indian Ocean	Cast member		
2021	Steve JOBson (스티브 JOB손)	Judge/director	with Seo Eun-kwang, Park Mi-sun	
2021	2021 New Year Special ISAC : Hall of Fame	Cast member		
2023	Boys Planet	Star master	Episodes 6–8	

=== Radio shows ===
Year	Title	Role	Notes	Ref.
2021–2023	Kiss the Radio	DJ	November 1, 2021 – June 4, 2023	

== Concert ==
- HUTAZONE: Two Night (2 and 3 February 2019)
- BOOM (30 and 31 July 2022)

== Awards and nominations ==
Name of the award ceremony, year presented, category, nominee of the award, and the result of the nomination
Award ceremony	Year	Category	Nominee / Work	Result	Ref.
KBS Entertainment Awards	2022	DJ of the Year	BtoB Kiss the Radio	Won	
Seoul Webfest	2019	Best Actor	Number Six	Nominated	
