= BtoB (band) =

South Korean boy band

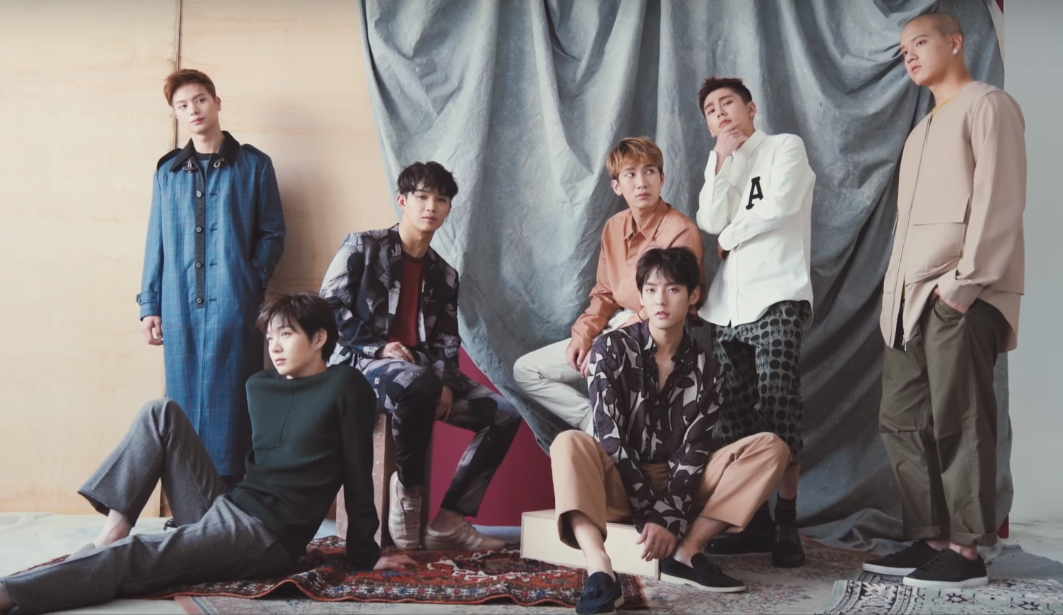
- BtoB in 2017; L–R: Yook Sung-jae, Lee Chang-sub, Im Hyun-sik, Seo Eun-kwang, Lee Min-hyuk, Jung Il-hoon (former), and Peniel

Background information
- Origin: Seoul, South Korea
- Genres: K-pop; dance-pop; R&B; J-pop
- Years active: 2012–present
- Labels: Cube; Universal Japan; BtoB Company
- Spinoffs: BtoB Blue; BtoB 4U; 90Tan
- Members: Seo Eun-kwang; Lee Min-hyuk; Lee Chang-sub; Im Hyun-sik; Peniel; Yook Sung-jae
- Past members: Jung Il-hoon
- Website: btobcompany.kr

BtoB (/ˈbiːtuːbiː/ BEE-too-bee; Korean: 비투비; acronym for Born to Beat; often stylized in all caps) is a South Korean boy band formed in 2012 by Cube Entertainment. The group consists of Seo Eun-kwang, Lee Min-hyuk, Lee Chang-sub, Im Hyun-sik, Peniel and Yook Sung-jae. BtoB was originally a septet; Jung Il-hoon departed from the group on December 31, 2020.

BtoB debuted on March 21, 2012, performing "Insane" (비밀) and "Imagine" on M Countdown. The group's debut EP, Born to Beat was released on April 3, 2012. They released their first full-length album, Complete, in June 2015. In November 2014, they made their Japanese debut with "Wow" under the Japanese agency Kiss Entertainment.

Since the group's 2012 debut, they have received multiple awards, including the 30th Golden Disc Awards Best Vocal Group in 2016, 2017 Melon Music Awards Top 10 Bonsang and 25th Seoul Music Awards Ballad Award in 2018. Five of their albums topped the Gaon Album Chart, and nine of their singles peaked in top ten on the national Gaon Digital Chart.

== History ==
=== Pre-debut ===
The group was formed by Cube Entertainment. It was stated from the start that Seo Eun-kwang, Lee Min-hyuk, Im Hyun-sik, Jung Il-hoon, and Lee Min-woo were on the list of original members who are waiting to be debuted under the name of "BtoB". They appeared on the JTBC sitcom "I Live in Cheongdam-dong" as an aspiring boy band working towards their debut. However, Lee Minwoo had dropped out of the list of confirmed members after their first appearance on the sitcom and the fact of him not debuting with BtoB had upset many fans. On March 23, 2012, Cube Entertainment had clarified that there were problems with Lee Min-woo's health, resulting in him being unable to blend into the group. Adding on, he would still be a trainee under Cube. If he was to recover, he would still get a chance to debut. He was confirmed to debut as a C-Clown member (stage name T.K.) under Yedang Entertainment.

=== 2012: Debut and mainstream success ===
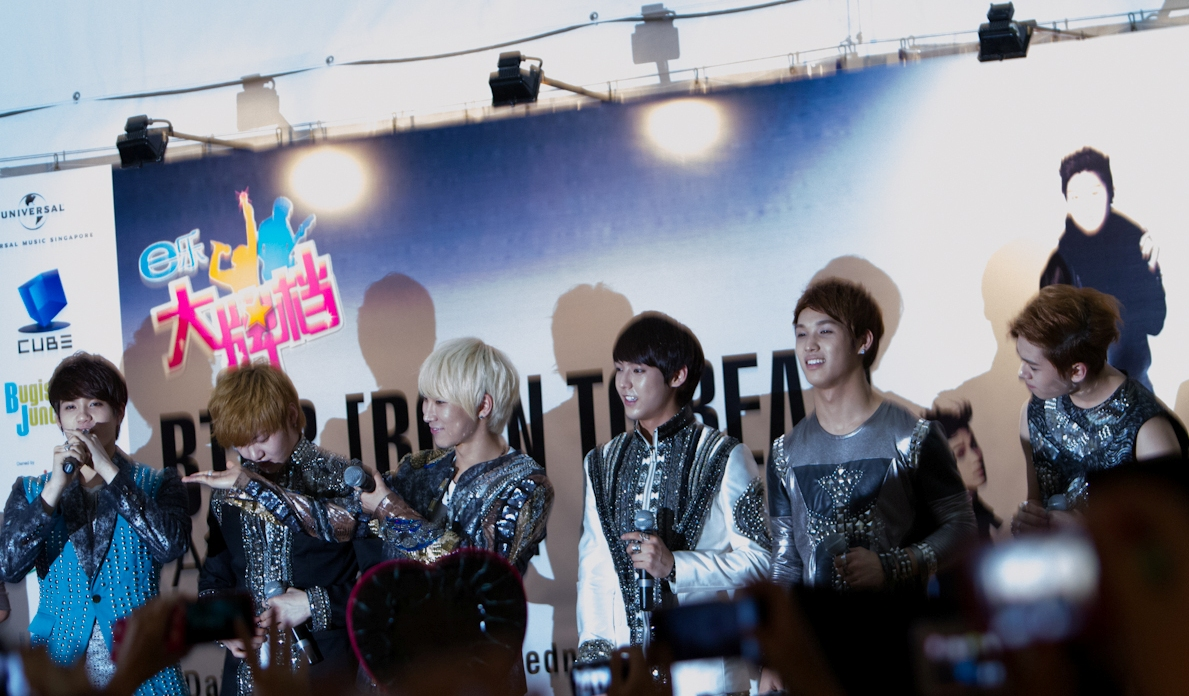
BtoB in Singapore at Bugis Junction on May 23, 2012

On March 21, BtoB made their debut in a showcase held in Seoul, which was streamed from their official YouTube channel. They performed their title track "Insane" (비밀; Bimil; lit. 'Secret'), "Imagine", and various other songs. BtoB then released their self-titled debut EP, Born to Beat on April 3 with songs co-written by Jörgen Elofsson. The EP includes the two debut title tracks of the group "Insane" and "Imagine", while the members of the group participated on writing the lyrics and raps for the album.

In April 2012, the group starred on their first reality program, Amazon, that was aired on Mnet.

On May 3, the group released the digital single, "Father" (아버지) along with a music video, in conjunction with May being the "Month of Family". An Asia Special Edition of their first EP was released on May 23, containing the previously released track, "Father" and the track "Irresistible Lips" (그 입술을 뺏었어; lit. 'I Stole Those Lips') which was first revealed on "I Live in Cheongdam-dong".

The release of the Born to Beat (Asia Special Edition) album marked the official start of their Asia promotions. They kick-started their promotions with a press conference in Singapore along with a promotional event in Bugis Square which attracted a crowd of 800 people. The following day, they performed at Clarke Quay for "Music Matters Live 2012", a five-night festival that featured 40 bands from 18 countries. A month later, they resumed their Asia promotions in Indonesia, participating in an interview with OneTV Asia. In addition, they held their first Indonesian showcase at the Mandarin Oriental Hotel in Jakarta on June 21, performing for both fans and media officials. They made their debut in Japan with a performance at the "K-Dream Live" concert at Tokyo Dome on July 29 alongside 5 other groups. In addition, the group performed at Sapporo Dome on August 1 for the "K-Pop Nonstop Live 2012 In Sapporo" concert.

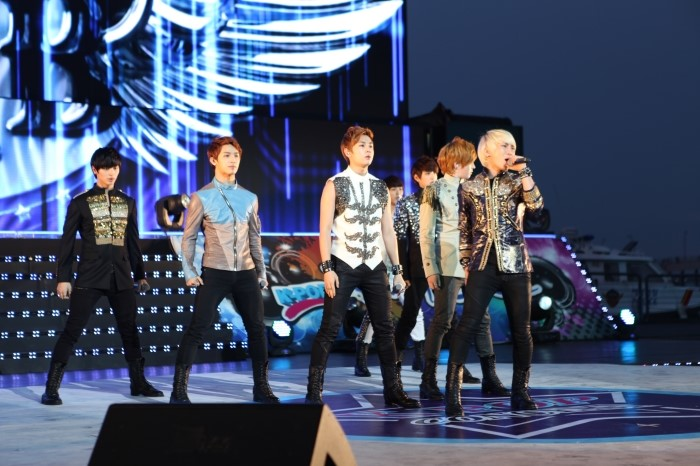
BtoB at the Expo 2012 Yeosu in June 2012

On September 12, the group released their second EP, Press Play along with its title track "Wow", which was composed by hit maker Kim Do-hoon. On October 18, the group started promoting the follow-up single "Lover Boy" (사랑밖에 난 몰라; lit. 'I Only Know Love') on M Countdown. A music video for the song was released on October 22 which consisted of a montage of the promotional events the group undertook throughout the year.

Following the end of their promotions for "I Only Know Love", the group commenced their overseas activities once again. They started off in Singapore on December 1, performing as part of a line-up for "Sundown Festival 2012", an event that invited solo and group acts from South Korea, China, Hong Kong, Taiwan and Japan. On December 11, the group performed as the opening act for the "2012 Asia Super Showcase" in Kuala Lumpur, Malaysia at Kenanga Wholesale City. The group became the first Korean artist to perform at the Thai Supermodel Concert on December 13 at the Bangkok Convention Center, and later held a press conference with around 70 media outlets.

=== 2013: Thriller ===
In February 2013, the group participated in the "2013 United Cube Concert" alongside other Cube Entertainment artists, 4minute, Beast, G.NA and Roh Ji-hoon. The concert took place in Seoul's Jamsil Indoor Stadium, and attracted over 7,000 fans, local and international, with additional concert dates in China and Japan.

On April 6, BtoB held their first fan-meet in Taiwan, "BTOB Press Play in Taiwan", for 1,000 fans. They later held two additional fan-meets in Thailand and Cambodia, meeting with around 2,000 fans in total. BtoB released their first digital single, "2nd Confession" (두 번째 고백) on April 10. The group started to promote the single with a stage performance on April 12, on M Countdown.

On August 29, BtoB released a music video for the track "When I Was Your Man" (내가 니 남자였을때), ahead of their official comeback in September. On September 4, the group performed their new tracks, "When I Was Your Man" and "Thriller" (스릴러) on MBC Music's Show Champion, prior to the release of their third EP Thriller, which was subsequently released on September 9.

=== 2014: Career breakthrough with Beep Beep, Move, Japanese debut and The Winter's Tale ===
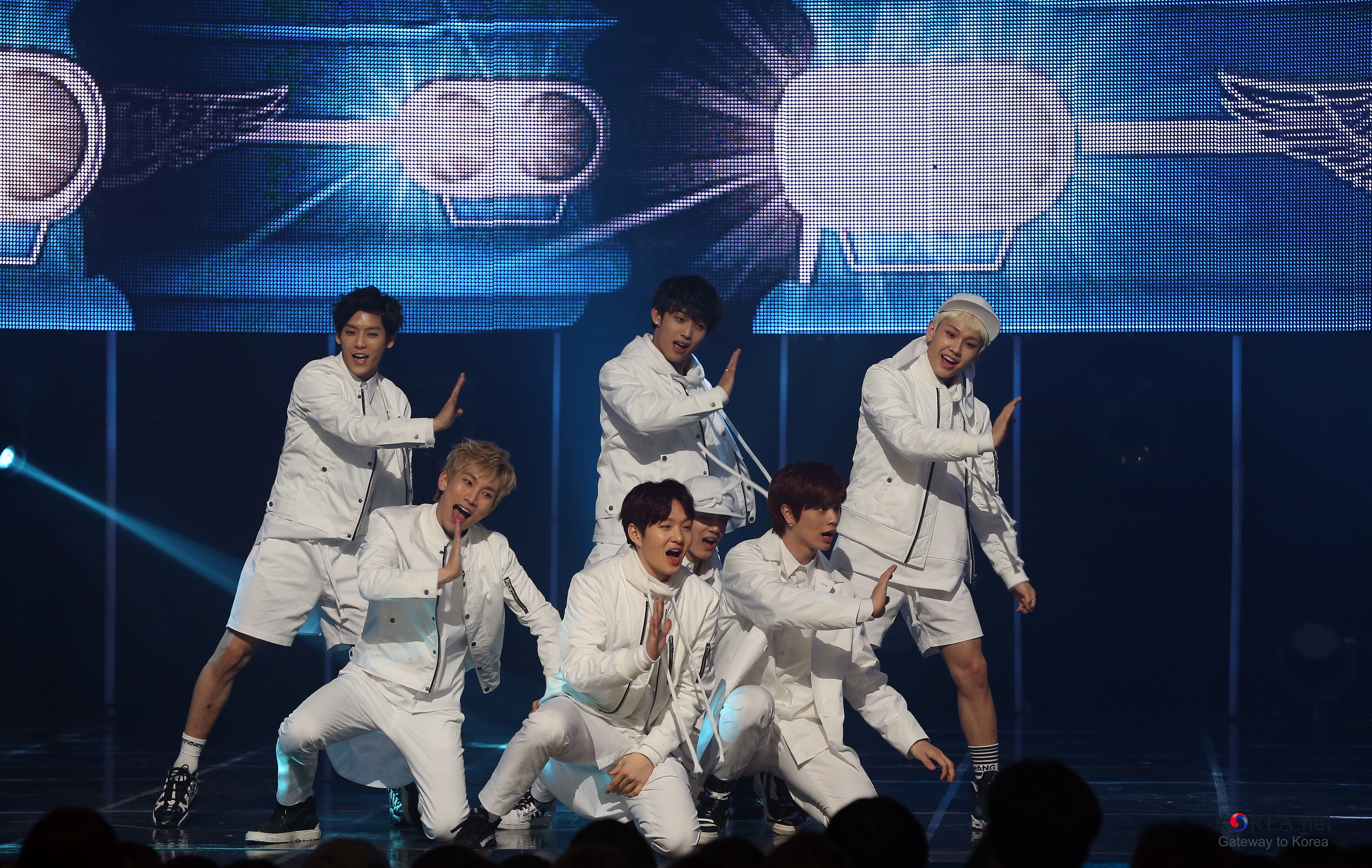
BtoB performing "Beep Beep" at M Countdown on March 6, 2014.

On February 17, BtoB released the group's fourth EP Beep Beep (뛰뛰빵빵; Dduiddui Bbangbbang). It includes the title track of the same title, which was produced by hit composers Brave Brothers. The group also held their album showcase at the Club Wave in Apjugeong, Seoul on the same day. The EP ranked first on the Gaon Album Chart for the ninth week of 2014, making it their first album to peak at the top spot. The group then began their album promotion with a performance on M Countdown on February 20.

In July, the group launched their first solo live concert, "Happy Summer Vacation with BTOB", in Japan with two concerts taking place on July 19 at Osaka and two concerts on July 21 at Tokyo, for a total of four shows. Each show gathered over 2,000 fans, for a total of 8,000 fans.

On September 29, BtoB released their fifth EP, Move, along with the lead single "You're So Fly" (넌 감동이야). They also introduced the group's new logo image. The logo image has heart shaped symbols that represent two capital B's for BtoB, expressing BtoB's love for the fans and its desire to present heart touching music.

BtoB held their first-ever solo concert in Korea, Hello Melody, from October 31 – November 4 at Olympic Park's Olympic Hall.

In October, BtoB signed a contract with a Japanese talent agency, Kiss Entertainment, for the group's activities in Japan. On November 12, the group released their first Japanese single, "WOW (Japanese ver.)" and began active promotions in Japan.

On December 22, the group released their winter EP The Winter's Tale. The EP contains five tracks including the pre-released track "You Can Cry" (울어도 돼) and the lead single "The Winter's Tale" (울면 안 돼; lit. 'You Can Cry'). "The Winter's Tale" is the group's first title track composed and produced by members Hyun-sik and Il-hoon.

=== 2015: It's Okay and Way Back Home ===
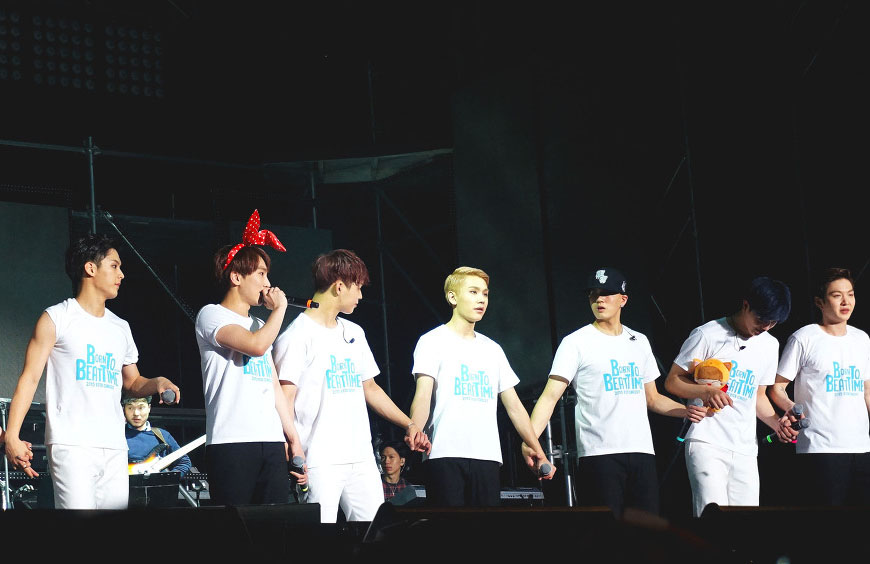
BtoB at Born to Beat Time in December 2015

On February 14 and 22, BtoB held their first official fan-meeting titled "Be My Valentine" in Osaka and Tokyo, Japan. All shows were sold-out, gathering a total of 5,000 fans. BtoB then released their first original Japanese single album, titled "Future" on March 25. The single recorded sales of about 70,000 and ranked second on Japan's Oricon Singles Chart. On the same day, their single charted first on the weekly overall chart for Tower Records, Japan's largest record store. They continued promoting throughout Japan (Osaka, Nagoya, and Tokyo) through concerts and various events until March 30.

On April 4, the group took its first exclusive concert "Hello Melody" in Busan, South Korea. It was held at the Busan KBS Hall. On April 29, the group held their first major solo concert tour in Japan, "The Secret Diary", six months after their Japanese debut, and reportedly gathered 10,000 fans.

On June 28, BtoB released their first full-length album Complete. The album comprises thirteen tracks including the lead single "It's Okay" (괜찮아요), "Shake It!" which was a bonus track from their fifth EP Move, and an acoustic version of their debut single "Insane". "It's Okay" is an R&B ballad track, and is also the group's first ever ballad single. The title track ranked at the top of multiple major music charts in South Korea upon its release, and is the first time the group topped charts since their debut in 2012.

Their third Japanese single, "Summer Color My Girl" (夏色 MY GIRL), was released on August 19, after the conclusion of their Korean promotions.

On October 12, BtoB released their seventh EP, I Mean, along with the music video for their title song, "Way Back Home" (집으로 가는 길). On October 21, BtoB received their first music show win, after 3 years and 7 months, on Show Champion, with the song "Way Back Home".

BtoB held their second solo concert, Born to Beat Time, on December 19 and 20 at Jangchung Arena. The tickets for the concert were sold-out in 5 minutes. They performed their hit songs in front of a total of 8,000 fans, and the show included special stages such as performances from their unit lines.

The group's transition to releasing ballad music achieved the group success, earning multiple nominations on year-end awards and winning the "Best Vocal Group Award" on the 30th Golden Disc Awards and the "Ballad Award" for "It's Okay" on the 25th Seoul Music Awards.

=== 2016: Remember That, New Men and 24/7 ===
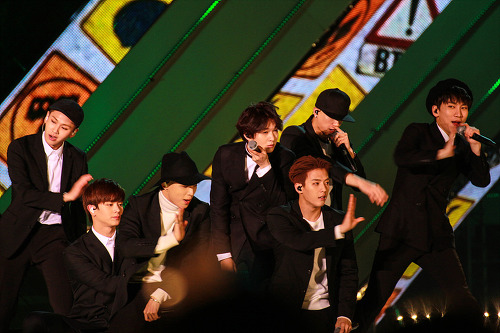
BtoB at the KBS Youth Concert on October 22, 2016

On February 3, BtoB released a short preview of their fourth Japanese single, Dear Bride. The full single was released on February 24. BtoB kicked off their long-awaited Zepp Tour, entitled BTOB Zepp Tour 2016 B-Loved, from February 10 to 14. They met fans across four cities in Japan including Nagoya, Tokyo, Fukuoka and Namba. On February 21, the group held their second fan-meet, "BTOB Awards", for 3,500 fans with the fan-meet being designed like an actual awards show. The group continued their successful concert events with Born to Beat Time: Encore Concert that was held on March 27–28 at Jamsil Arena for 14,000 fans. On March 28, BtoB released their eighth EP, Remember That, with the title track "Remember That" (봄날의 기억; lit. 'Memories of Spring'), concluding their ballad trilogy.

The group released their fifth Japanese single, L.U.V, on June 15. It debuted on top of the weekly Oricon chart and Billboard Japan Hot 100 chart, selling over 77,000 copies in its first week.

On June 24, BtoB performed at the KCON 2016 NY in Newark, New Jersey. On August 6, BtoB released a special digital single for summer, "I Want to Vacation" (여행 가고 싶어), as a present for fans. The song was composed and produced by Jerry.L and Sweetch, with the rap parts written by Ilhoon, Minhyuk and Peniel. It was also used as the theme song for the KBS2 variety show Battle Trip.

On November 7, BtoB released their ninth mini album, New Men. It includes the promotional track "I'll Be Your Man" (기도; lit. 'Pray') which marks the group's first dance title track release after two years and two months. "I'll Be Your Man" is written, composed and arranged by member Im Hyun-sik while all the members participated on the side tracks of the album. The title track, shortly after its release, topped multiple music charts.

After the promotions of New Men in South Korea, the group head over to Japan and released their first Japanese full-length album 24/7. The album includes BtoB's past Japanese singles "Wow" (Japanese ver.) and "Mirai Ashita", and the lead single "Christmas Time". 24/7 topped the weekly Oricon chart, selling 27,000 copies in a week.

=== 2017: Feel'eM, Piece of BtoB and Brother Act. ===
BtoB held their third solo concert, BtoB Time, from January 21–22 at the SK Olympic Handball Gymnasium.

On March 5, BtoB held their third official fan-meeting "BtoB's Secret Room" before the release of upcoming EP. On March 6, BtoB released their tenth mini-album, Feel'eM. The mini-album includes the pre-released single "Someday" (언젠가) and the lead single "Movie". "Someday" is an emotional ballad track composed and written by Im Hyun-sik and co-written by Lee Min-hyuk and Jung Il-hoon. It topped multiple charts upon its release. "Movie" is a funky dance track co-written and co-composed by member Jung Il-hoon. The group released a Japanese version of the single "Movie" on May 3. On August 30, the group released their seventh original Japanese single "Brand New Days" which debuted at number 2 on the Oricon chart.

From April to September, each of the BtoB members released solo digital singles as part of the Piece of BtoB project. Lee Chang-sub started the project with a self-composed ballad track "At the End". It was followed by Jung Il-hoon's up-tempo hip-hop track "Fancy Shoes", Peniel's "That Girl", Im Hyun-sik's self-produced alternative-rock track "Swimming", Lee Min-hyuk's R&B hip-hop song "Purple Rain" featuring singer Cheeze, Yook Sung-jae's ballad track "Tell Me" (말해) along with the b-side, "Paradise" and was concluded with Seo Eun-kwang's ballad track "One Day" (이제 겨우 하루) and the b-side "Back Then" (그때).

On September 20, BtoB was awarded their first Bonsang at the 1st Soribada Best K-Music Awards.

After the conclusion of their Piece of BtoB project, the group released their second studio album Brother Act. on October 16. The title track "Missing You" (그리워하다) is a pop-ballad produced and written by Im Hyun-sik, with rap verses written by members Lee Min-hyuk, Jung Il-hoon and Peniel, respectively. "Missing You" topped multiple major music charts upon its release. It also peaked at number two on the Gaon Digital Chart, becoming their highest-charting single on the chart.

BtoB held their fourth solo concert 2017 BtoB Time - Our Concert, from December 23–24 at the Ilsan Kintex Exhibition Center.

=== 2018–2019: This Is Us, Hour Moment, contract renewals and enlistments ===
BtoB held their fifth solo concert 2017 BtoB Time – Our Concert in Busan, February 24 at BEXCO. On February 27, 2018, BtoB was appointed as ambassadors for Korea Tourism Organization, as a boy group who has high recognition overseas and gained popularity. They released a pre-release single, "The Feeling", on June 11, prior to the release of their 11th EP. The song is a sentimental summer song composed by Jung Il-hoon and co-written by Lee Min-hyuk, Peniel, and Jung Il-hoon ahead of the comeback on June 18. On June 13, they made their debut on Billboard's Social 50 Chart by charting at number 21. The group released their eleventh mini album, This Is Us, on June 18. On July 10, all seven members renewed their contract with Cube Entertainment. BtoB held their sixth solo concert 2018 BtoB Time – This Is Us at Olympic Gymnastics Arena in Seoul for three days from August 10–12, Taiwan at Hsing Chuang Gymnasium on September 8, The Kasablanka, Jakarta on September 21. and CentralPlaza Chaengwattana, Bangkok on October 14. In August 2018, Lee Min-hyuk was randomly selected as the second leader, during a VLive broadcast, to fill in for Seo Eun-kwang, who was due to begin his mandatory military service later that month. On November 12, the group released a special album titled Hour Moment without the participation of Seo Eun-kwang, with the song "Beautiful Pain" functioning as the lead single.

On March 21, 2019, BtoB celebrated their seventh anniversary and chose a new leader now that Lee Min-hyuk has gone to the military as well. Peniel was selected to be the leader, however, due to their decision beforehand, Yook Sung-jae became the third leader. On April 5, a digital single "Sorry" was released. It was an unreleased song that Seo Eun-kwang, Lee Min-hyuk, and Lee Chang-sub prepared before their respective enlistments. It is a mid-tempo ballad composed by Lee Min-hyuk.

=== 2020–2021: Military service, BtoB 4U, Ilhoon's departure, Kingdom: Legendary War and 4U: Outside ===
On April 7, 2020, Seo Eun-kwang was officially discharged following protocols as a result of the COVID-19 pandemic. Im Hyun-sik and Yook Sung-jae enlisted on May 11, while Jung Il-hoon enlisted on May 28. Lee Chang-sub was officially discharged on August 21, 2020, followed by Lee Min-hyuk on September 12. They were discharged earlier due to the current COVID-19 protocol. On October 27, Seo Eun-kwang, Lee Min-hyuk, Lee Chang-sub, and Peniel announced that they have formed a unit called BtoB 4U. The unit debuted on November 16. On December 31, 2020, Cube Entertainment announced that Jung Il-hoon would leave BtoB after being investigated for using marijuana. He was under investigation from the Seoul Metropolitan Police Agency for purchasing and using marijuana in prior years and was also charged for violating the Narcotics Control Act. The group would then continue their activities together as a six-member group with no additional members.

The four-member lineup of BtoB participated in Kingdom: Legendary War, a competition show alongside five other K-pop boy groups, from April to June 2021. On August 30, 2021, BtoB released the special album 4U: Outside, with "Outsider" serving as the lead single. On October 27, BtoB released the Japanese special mini album Outsider. Im Hyun-sik and Yook Sung-jae were discharged from the military on November 14, 2021, completing BtoB's military service. On November 18, 2021, BtoB attended BtoB's Kiss the Radio, hosted by member Lee Min-hyuk, marking their first full-group appearance in three years.

=== 2022–present: Be Together, Wind and Wish, departure from Cube Entertainment and establishment of BtoB Company ===
On February 21, 2022, BtoB released their third studio album Be Together, with the title track "The Song" composed by member Im Hyun-sik, in commemoration of the group's 10th debut anniversary. The album was a chart success with even b-sides charting high. With Be Together, BtoB also beat their own first-week sales record from 2018 and accumulated over a million in total album sales. "The Song" went on to win two music show wins on Show Champion and M Countdown on March 2 and 3, respectively. The band was supposed to hold its 10th anniversary concert in March 2022. Due to multiple band members getting positive COVID-19 results a week before the concert, the three-day concert was postponed to a yet unknown later date. In November 2022, it was announced that BtoB will hold a 10th anniversary concert "Be Together" on December 30–31, 2022, and January 1, 2023.

In February 2023, Cube Entertainment released a teaser poster for the BtoB Official Fan Club Melody 5th Fan Meeting 'Melody Company Training' to be held on March 18 and 19 at the Olympic Park SK Handball Stadium. It was also simultaneously streamed online.

On May 2, 2023, BtoB made a comeback with their 12th EP Wind and Wish.

On November 6, 2023, after eleven years, the members of BtoB departed from Cube Entertainment following the completion of their contracts.

In February 2024, BtoB announced the establishment of sub-label BtoB Company under DOD Entertainment for BtoB group activities and solo activities of members' Seo Eun-kwang, Lee Min-hyuk, Im Hyun-sik, and Peniel. Lee Chang-sub and Yook Sung-jae signed contracts with Fantagio and IWill Media, respectively for the management of their solo activities.

In March 2026, it was announced that BtoB will release a digital single "We Together" on March 21, in commemoration of the group's 14th debut anniversary.

== Members ==
Five members of BtoB completed their military services during the time period between August 2018 and November 2021. In 2018, Seo Eun-kwang enlisted on August 21. In 2019, Lee Chang-sub enlisted on January 14 and Lee Min-hyuk enlisted on February 7. In 2020, Seo Eun-kwang completed his military duties on April 7, Im Hyun-sik and Yook Sung-jae enlisted on May 11. Jung Il-hoon enlisted on May 28, before departing the group on December 31. On August 21, Lee Chang-sub completed his service. On September 12, Lee Min-hyuk completed his military duties. In 2021, Im Hyun-sik and Yook Sung-jae were the final members to complete their service, being discharged on November 14.

Current members

- Seo Eun-kwang (서은광)
- Lee Min-hyuk (이민혁)
- Lee Chang-sub (이창섭)
- Im Hyun-sik (임현식)
- Peniel (프니엘)
- Yook Sung-jae (육성재)

Former members

- Jung Il-hoon (정일훈)

== Subgroups ==
=== BtoB Blue ===
In September 2016, BtoB revealed their first unit group, BtoB Blue (Korean: 비투비 블루) consisting of the group's vocalists, Seo Eun-kwang, Lee Chang-sub, Im Hyun-sik, and Yook Sung-jae. BtoB Blue released the digital single, "Stand By Me" (Korean: 내 곁에 서 있어줘; RR: Nae Gyeote Seo Isseojwo), on September 19, 2016.

BtoB Blue released the digital single, "When It Rains", on August 2, 2018. The single was composed by group member Im Hyun-sik.

=== BtoB 4U ===
In October 2020, BtoB revealed their second unit group, BtoB 4U (비투비 포유) consisting of members Seo Eun-kwang, Lee Min-hyuk, Lee Chang-sub, and Peniel. Lee Min-hyuk explained that the name means "For you" and also refers to how there are four members in the unit. They debuted with their first mini-album Inside with title track "Show Your Love" on November 16, 2020.

=== 90Tan ===
On July 23, 2024, it was announced that BtoB members Seo Eun-kwang and Lee Min-hyuk would form the sub-unit 90Tan. They debuted on July 31 with the single "Tang Tang Tang".

== Philanthropy ==
During their The Winter's Tale activities in January 2015, BtoB members has donated safety gloves to donate them through National Emergency Management Agency and were soon delivered to Jeollanam Firefighting Headquarters (Jeonnam Fire Service).

On June 30, 2015, BtoB posted their plans for Complete activities and began an enter-to-win event under the title, "It's Okay, Everyone". To participate in the event, people who bought BtoB's Complete album can enter the album's 16-digit serial number in the event homepage. BtoB will later randomly choose the winners of the events the group will hold in the near future. For every person who participates in the donation event, $0.45 is raised. The donation will eventually be made under BtoB's fan club's name, Melody. Over $1,475 was raised within three days and the number is rapidly increasing. BtoB decided to begin this special donation event to let the public know that they genuinely wish to support those who feel lonely and lost, just like the lyrics in their title track, "It's Okay".

On October 21, 2017, BtoB donated ₩50 Million to help the victims of the Pohang earthquake.

Since 2017, BtoB has been the ambassador for Juvenile Diabetes Association. They undertakes philanthropy work such as donations, giving scholarships and performing concerts for the cause. In 2018, BtoB received a Seoul Mayoral Award, for their continuous help.

BtoB took part in 'CPP Cruise 2018 – Busan Sea Blue', Asia's first color-themed cruise designed to create domestic cruise tourism demand and promote K fashion to Asia. The ship departed from Busan to Tokyo with a variety of travel cultures such as fashion shows, musical performances, parties, and donations being held for children with disabilities and auction for low-income children with medical needs.

On April 12, 2019, World Human Bridge, an international relief development NGO announced that BtoB's fan club 'Melody' has donated ₩1,950,000 under the name of 'BtoB & Melody' to help the victims of Sokcho Fire. The donation is the sum of seven BtoB members' ages and will be used to support the daily necessities and food for 1,000 Goseong victims.

In 2020, BtoB fanclub 'Melody' donated ₩3.21 million through Gyeongsan World Human Bridge for medical staff who are struggling with COVID-19 pandemic in South Korea especially in Daegu and North Gyeongsan Province.

== Ambassadorship ==
On June 17, 2021, BtoB was selected as the official ambassador for Shopee's K-Collection, a Korean brand exhibition in which 50 domestic small and medium-sized enterprises participate through Shopee's Live Shopee Singapore, Shopee Malaysia, Shopee Philippines, and Shopee Vietnam. The group will introduce products directly through Shopee's Live and hold an exclusive online fan meeting to actively attract local K-pop fans as customers.

On March 30, 2022, BtoB was appointed as an ambassador for "2022 Boryeong Sea Mud Exhibition", which was held at Daecheon Beach in Boryeong, South Chungcheong Province, from July 16 to August 15.

== Discography ==
Korean albums

- Complete (2015)
- Brother Act. (2017)
- Be Together (2022)

Japanese albums

- 24/7 (2016)

== Filmography ==
=== Reality shows ===
Year	Title	Network	Notes
2012	Amazon (Idol Master Zone)	Mnet	
2012	BtoB MTV Diary	SBS MTV	
2012–2013	Sik's Sense	YouTube, Naver Starcast	
2012–2013	BtoB's B+ Diary	SBS MTV	
2013	Manager Self Camera (MSC Season 1)	YouTube, Naver Starcast	
2014	BLACK BOX (MSC Season 2)	YouTube, Naver Starcast	
2014	BtoB's Cool Men	SBS MTV	
2014–2015	The Beat	YouTube, Naver Starcast, V Live	
2016	The Beat Extra	YouTube, V Live	
2016–2023	BEATCOM	YouTube, V Live	
2021	Kingdom: Legendary War	Mnet	4th Place
2017	BtoB: Conti-NEW	V Live CH+	
2022	Born TO BTOB	U+IdolLive	First Broadcast 6PM KST January, 29
2022	BTOB 3 Meals	YouTube	
2024–present	BTODAY	YouTube	

=== DVDs ===
- "Born TO Beat" BtoB Debut & History
- 2013 BtoB – 1st Concert [Hello, Melody]
- 2014 BtoB 1st Fanmeeting
- 2015 BtoB Secret Diary
- 2015 BtoB – It's OK Special
- 2015–16 BtoB Born to Beat Time Concert
- 2017 BtoB EP#03 & #04 Time Concert

== Concerts and tours ==
=== Tours ===
- BtoB Zepp Tour 2016 B-Loved (2016)
- BtoB Zepp Tour BtoB Time Japan (2017)

=== Headlining concerts ===
- Happy Summer Vacation with BtoB (2014)
- 1st concert: Hello Melody (2014–2015)
- 1st solo concert: 'The Secret Diary' (2015)
- 2nd concert: Born to Beat Time (2015–2016)
- Born To Beat Time ~ Encore (2016)
- 3rd concert: BtoB Time (2017)
- 4th concert: BtoB Time – Our Concert (2017–2018)
- 5th Concert: BtoB Time – This Is Us (2018)
- 6th Concert: BtoB Time – Be Together (2022)

=== I'll Be Your Melody concerts ===
- Be Your Melody (2015)
- You and Me, Memories of Spring (2016)
- Like A Movie (2017)
- Missing Melody (2018)
- Can't Live Without Melody (2018)
