= BtoB Blue =

South Korean boy band

BtoB Blue 비투비-블루
- Origin: Seoul, South Korea
- Genres: K-pop; Ballad; R&B
- Years active: 2016; 2018
- Label: Cube
- Spinoff of: BtoB
- Members: Seo Eun-kwang; Lee Chang-sub; Im Hyun-sik; Yook Sung-jae

BtoB Blue (Korean: 비투비-블루) is the first official sub-unit of South Korean boy band BtoB formed under Cube Entertainment in 2016. The sub-group consists of the group's vocal line Seo Eun-kwang, Lee Chang-sub, Im Hyun-sik and Yook Sung-jae. The sub-unit debuted with their digital single titled "Stand By Me" on September 19, 2016.

== History ==
=== Predebut ===
Prior to their debut as a subgroup, the group had performed on several singing competitions. In 2014, the group appeared on Mnet The Singer Game with the theme of 'A song you want to hear when you want to curse at your boss' to the 100-member judges of stressed office workers, and sang Urban Zakapa's "I Hate You" (니가 싫어), but lost during the first round with 69 to 31.

In 2016, the group appeared on Immortal Songs: Singing the Legend singing "To My Love" (님에게). The group has captivated the audience with its overwhelming performance and quirky charm and emotional performance that shows off their vocal skills. Their vocal performance received a warm reception by the audience, describing "sweet voice, beautiful harmony, and rich sensibility." The senior singers who saw the quartet group's stage gave admiration and praised it, saying, "The harmony was perfect, and the four people sang in harmony with each other's colours." The quartet scored 427 points, defeating Hong Ji-min, Homme, Second Moon and Lim Do-hyeok, winning 4 consecutive wins and won the championship.

=== 2016–2018: Debut and "When It Rains" ===
On September 12, 2016, a picture captioned, "Coming soon! 2016.09.19. 00:00(KST)." were posted to BtoB's Twitter account that formed an image of BtoB members crowded around a director's camera, staring intently into the monitor. Following that, Cube Entertainment announced that they will debut BtoB's first unit, BtoB Blue with digital single "Stand By Me". The song is produced by Black Eyed Pilseung who previously worked on hit songs for Sistar, Twice, and more. "Stand By Me" is described as a ballad featuring their matured and sorrowful voices. BtoB member Peniel directly participated in the music video production. Immediately after the release, the song charted on several Korean music charts, Monkey 3 ranked 1st, Melon ranked 3rd and Mnet ranked 2nd. On September 24, they performed for the first time on MBC's Show! Music Core stage.

On July 8, 2017, BtoB Blue performed The Blue's "Under the Sky" (하늘 아래서) on KBS' program Immortal Songs 2. Although the group lost to Homme, the original singer Kim Min-jong of The Blue commented, "I was really impressed with their singing, beautiful melody, thank you." and Son Ji-chang said, "It was a time that seemed to be a great strength for me to live in the future."

== Discography ==
=== Singles ===
List of singles, with selected chart positions, showing year released and album name
Title	Year	Peak chart positions	Sales	Album
Title	Year	KOR	Sales	Album
"Stand By Me" (내 곁에 서 있어줘)	2016	15	KOR (DL): 101,252	Non-album single
"When It Rains" (비가내리면)	2018	58	—N/a	Non-album single

=== Music videos ===
Title	Year	Director(s)	Ref.
"Stand By Me"	2016	BtoB's Peniel	
"When It Rains"	2018		

== Filmography ==
=== Variety shows ===
Year	Title	Network	Notes	Ref.
2014	Global Request Show: A Song For You 3	KBS	Noel - "Forgotten" (잊혀진다는거)	
2014	The Singer Game	Mnet	Contestant, episode 6	
2016	Immortal Songs: Singing the Legend	KBS	Contestant, episode 264	
2017	Immortal Songs: Singing the Legend	KBS	Contestant, episode 311	
2018	Two Yoo Project Sugar Man	JTBC	Lee Ki-chan - "Cold", episode 13	

== Awards and nominations ==
Year	Award	Category	Nominated work	Result	Ref.
2016	Immortal Songs: Singing the Legend	Song of the Week - Summer Song Festival Special	"To My Love"	Won	
2017	Immortal Songs: Singing the Legend	Song of the Week - The Blue	The Blue - "Under the Sky"	2nd	
