= Sweet, Savage Family =

2015 South Korean television series

- Promotional poster for Sweet, Savage Family
- Also known as: My Sweet and Sour Family; Sweet, Scary Family; Sweet Mob Family
- Genre: Family; Comedy; Romance
- Created by: Han Hee (MBC)
- Written by: Son Geun-joo; Kim Ji-eun
- Directed by: Kang Dae-sun
- Starring: Jung Joon-ho; Moon Jeong-hee; Jung Woong-in; Yoo Sun
- Composer: Seo Woo-young
- Country of origin: South Korea
- Original language: Korean
- No. of episodes: 16

Production
- Executive producers: Jung Jae-hee; Jung Tae-won
- Producers: Namkoong; Sung-woo
- Running time: 70 minutes
- Production company: Taewon Entertainment

Original release
- Network: MBC TV
- Release: November 18, 2015 – January 14, 2016

Sweet, Savage Family (Korean: 달콤살벌 패밀리; RR: Dalkomsalbeol paemilli) is a 2015 South Korean television series starring Jung Joon-ho, Moon Jeong-hee, Jung Woong-in and Yoo Sun. It aired on MBC on Wednesdays and Thursdays at 22:00 beginning November 18, 2015. The series is loosely based on the Marrying the Mafia film franchise, which also starred Jung Joon-ho.

== Plot ==
Yoon Tae-soo (Jung Joon-ho) struggles to balance his life as a kind loving father who heads his family while hiding his mob identity from them. Hoping to gain the respect of his grown-up children and hold his head high in front of others, Tae-soo tries to legalize his construction company to incorporate his gang into proper, clean businesses only to meet obstruction from his biggest rival, Baek Ki-beom (Jung Woong-in).

== Cast ==
=== Main characters ===
- Jung Joon-ho as Yoon Tae-soo (42, male / Choongshim Gang boss)

He manages night clubs, gentlemen's clubs, illicit gambling parlors, liquor distribution as the boss of the Choongshim gang. When he was only in his late teens, he already made a name for himself as a tough streetfighter in Daejeon. But he had to support his mom and siblings so once he finished high school, he started working at a paint factory where he had to deal with noxious fumes every day at work. But despite his hard work, the factory boss never paid him his salary. He needed money to support his siblings, so out of anger, he assaulted his boss. His boss pressed charges but offered to drop them if he were to agree to work at the factory for a year without pay. His friend Gi-bum and Byung-nam, who were members of the Choongshim Gang, heard about his plight and did extensive damage to the paint factory. Their gang handled the blowback from their rampage. After this incident, Tae-soo naturally joined the Choongshim gang.

- Moon Jeong-hee as Kim Eun-ok (42, female / Tae-soo's wife)

Her husband is a gang leader and her mother-in-law is a sociopath who torments her at every chance. Her daughter is constantly getting in trouble at school for bad behavior. Her life is terrible on so many levels. She is not happy with her husband's occupation but she gets to live in a big, expensive apartment, and the money he makes is good so she is not complaining. But when Tae-soo does not answer his phone when she calls or comes home late, she gets very irritated and will nag him like nobody's business.

- Jung Woong-in as Baek Gi-bum (42, male / President, Choongshim Construction)

Chairman Baek Man-bo's only son. Gi-bum is the future chairman of Choongshim Construction and currently works as the president. This is not what he wants but his father did not want his son to be involved in gang activities. His mother left the family when he was a young kid and this scarred him permanently. In the following years, he had different stepmothers, who he would treat with scorn and malice until they went away. This gave his dad a lot of headaches on top of his bad behavior at school. In high school, he picked fights with Tae-soo and Byung-nam but always got beaten. But the three of them forged a friendship and they were invincible around the streets of Daejeon. Due to his fiery temper, he got into a lot of trouble at school and was finally expelled by the principal. After that, he joined a gang.

- Yoo Sun as Lee Do-kyung (female / Gi-bum's ex-wife)
- Kim Eung-soo as Baek Man-bo (70, male / Chairman, Choongshim Construction)

He is the gang boss who held onto power the longest in Chungcheong Province and was a legendary boss in his prime. In the 1990s, he retired from his gang leader position but since he was able to amass a large fortune during his reign, he still wields power in the gang he founded. After retiring, he kept a low profile and appointed Tae-soo as the gang boss who oversees his many business interests in the underworld. His son Gi-bum oversees his real estate holdings and construction company while Hee-do, who has an MBA degree, is the brains who manages investments and bookkeeping.

- Lee Min-hyuk as Yoon Sung-min (18, male / Tae-soo's son)

He has an easy-going personality and is popular at school because he is approachable and friendly. He excels academically and constantly ranks near the top of his entire grade at high school while also performing his duties as the class president. He started taekwondo, judo, and kendo at an early age under his dad's coaching so he is physically strong and athletic. Unlike his dad, he is academically inclined and is rather innocent about many things for a kid his age. His mother, Eun-ok wishes to see him go to one of the top universities in Seoul and has arranged for him to transfer to a high school in the big city soon.

- Bang Min-ah as Baek Hyun-ji (18, female / Ki-beom's daughter)

She was a member of a girl band that never took off and you have to be pretty to get picked up by a talent agency so it goes without saying that she has great looks. After her parents divorced five years ago, she was forced to move to Seoul to live with her mom and this was against her wishes. She signed on with a talent agency and enrolled in their talent training program because of her mom. She made an effort in learning how to dance and sing but there were so many talented girls in the program that she never got her shot. But what caused her a lot of grief was being bullied at her school.

=== Supporting characters ===
- Ji Soo-won as Oh Joo-ran
- Jo Dal-hwan as Bong Jin-wook
- Kim Kwon as Lee Joon-suk
- Oh Mi-yeon as Lee Choon-boon
- Kim Ji-min as Yoon Soo-min (Tae-soo's daughter)
- Son Ga-young as Kim Eun-shil
- Choi Min-chul as Kang Sung-goo
- Kim Shin as Song Young-il
- Kim Won-hae as Son Se-woon
- Kim Dae-ryung as Ma Hee-do
- Ga Deuk-hee as Park Sun-young
- Jo Ji-hwan as Jang Beob-kyu
- Park Hee-jin as Choi Kyung-mi
- Seo Hyun-chul as Seo Chul-joong
- Kim Byung-choon as Jo Dong-Choon
- Kim Byoung-ok as Chairman Goo
- Park Ah-sung as Bully
- Hong Jin-young as ex- girlfriend

== Ratings ==
- In the table below, the blue numbers represent the lowest ratings and the red numbers represent the highest ratings.
- NR denotes that the drama did not rank in the Top 20 daily rankings.

Episode #	Original broadcast date	Average audience share			
Episode #	Original broadcast date	TNmS Ratings		AGB Nielsen	
Episode #	Original broadcast date	Nationwide	Seoul National Capital Area	Nationwide	Seoul National Capital Area
1	November 18, 2015	8.3% (NR)	9.7% (NR)	9.1% (16th)	9.2% (16th)
2	November 19, 2015	6.7% (20th)	7.0% (19th)	7.2% (20th)	8.1% (18th)
3	November 25, 2015	7.1% (19th)	7.8% (15th)	7.6% (NR)	8.4% (19th)
4	November 26, 2015	6.7% (NR)	7.1% (NR)	8.2% (NR)	9.5% (19th)
5	December 2, 2015	6.3% (NR)	6.7% (20th)	7.8% (19th)	8.8% (15th)
6	December 3, 2015	5.7% (NR)	6.5% (NR)	6.5% (NR)	7.3% (NR)
7	December 9, 2015	6.0% (NR)	6.4% (NR)	7.0% (NR)	7.8% (16th)
8	December 10, 2015	4.9% (NR)	5.2% (NR)	6.2% (NR)	7.0% (NR)
9	December 16, 2015	4.7% (NR)	4.5% (NR)	5.8% (NR)	6.8% (NR)
10	December 17, 2015	5.0% (NR)	4.8% (NR)	5.2% (NR)	8.1% (NR)
11	December 23, 2015	4.2% (NR)	4.1% (NR)	4.4% (NR)	7.7% (NR)
12	December 24, 2015	4.0% (NR)	6.8% (NR)	4.7% (NR)	7.7% (NR)
13	January 6, 2016	5.9% (NR)	7.5% (NR)	4.2% (NR)	7.4% (NR)
14	January 7, 2016	4.6% (NR)	7.4% (NR)	4.6% (NR)	8.2% (NR)
15	January 13, 2016	5.4% (NR)	8.0% (NR)	4.4% (NR)	8.8% (NR)
16	January 14, 2016	4.9% (NR)	8.0% (NR)	4.0% (NR)	8.3% (NR)
Average		5.7%	-	6.1%	-

- This drama was originally plan for 20 episodes. However, it was reduced to 16 episodes due to the low ratings of this drama.
- The broadcast of Episode 13 scheduled on December 30, 2015 was cancelled due to the MBC Drama Awards.
- The broadcast of Episode 14 scheduled on December 31, 2015 was cancelled due to the MBC Gayo Daejun.
