= Peniel Shin =

American rapper

Peniel
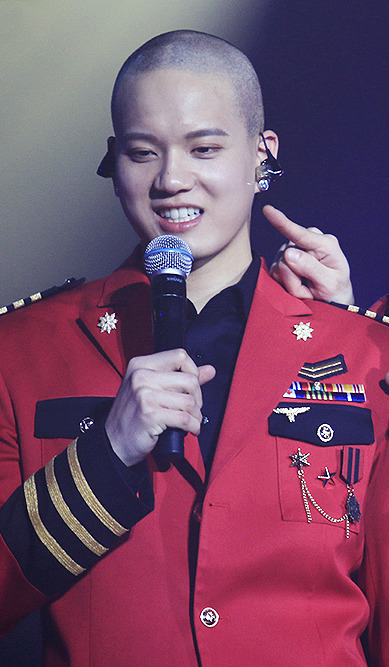
- Peniel at BtoB Time concert in January 2017
- Born: Peniel Dong Shin; March 10, 1993 (age 33); Chicago, Illinois, U.S.
- Other name: Shin Dong-geun
- Occupations: Rapper; singer; dancer
- Musical career
- Genres: K-pop; hip hop; dance
- Instrument: Vocals
- Years active: 2012–present
- Labels: Cube; BtoB Company
- Member of: BtoB
- Formerly of: BtoB 4U

Korean name
- Hangul: 신동근
- Hanja: 辛東根
- RR: Sin Donggeun
- MR: Sin Tonggŭn

Signature
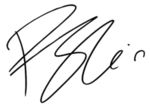

Peniel Dong Shin (Korean: 프니엘 동 신; born March 10, 1993), better known mononymously as Peniel (Korean: 프니엘), is an American rapper, singer and dancer based in South Korea. He debuted as a member of the South Korean boyband BtoB in 2012.

== Biography ==
Peniel Dong Shin was born in Chicago, Illinois, U.S. on March 10, 1993. Peniel attended Barbara B. Rose Elementary School before going on to Barrington Middle School Prairie Campus in the northwest suburbs of Chicago. He attended Chungdam High School after moving to Seoul to train.

=== Music career ===
Before joining Cube Entertainment, he was a trainee under JYP Entertainment and also appeared in San E's "Tasty San" music video in 2010. In March 2012, he debuted as a lead rapper of idol group BtoB under Cube Entertainment. He became the main host of Arirang's music program, Pops in Seoul in 2013.

In 2016, on May 1, he released his first English mixtape with KAIROS, titled Homesick. On September 19, BtoB Blue released a music video for their debut single "Stand by Me" which was directed by him.

On June 27, 2017, Peniel released the digital single "That Girl" as part of BtoB's 2017 solo project, Piece of BtoB.

In 2019, Peniel released his second digital single, "B.O.D", on May 13. "B.O.D" is a hip-hop song that delivers the energy and vibe of a party inspired from Korean nightlife. Two months later, he released the digital single, "Fly23", on July 31. On August 27, Peniel released his fourth digital single, "Flip", featuring South Korean rapper Beenzino. On November 15, he was featured on the song "Beautiful Girl" by Woosung of The Rose.

In 2020, Peniel collaborated with bandmate Yook Sung-jae for the song "Hypnotized". The song, which was co-composed by him, was released on February 6 as a part of Yook's project single "3X2=6 Part 3".

On October 27, 2020, Cube announced that they have formed a unit called BtoB 4U consisting Peniel, Seo Eun-kwang, Lee Min-hyuk, and Lee Chang-sub. The unit debuted on November 16 with their first mini-album, Inside and title track "Show Your Love".

On February 14, 2021, Peniel released a new digital single "Valentine".

BtoB, including him, departed from Cube in November 2023.

In February 2024, BtoB announced the establishment of BtoB Company for the group activities and for his solo activities.

On June 19, 2024, Peniel released a digital single "story of my L:ife" with two tracks "Come Home" and “MIoBI (Make It or Break It)”. Then on September 29, he released a follow up single "story of my L:ove" with the tracks "Daydream" and "Stuck On You", featuring additional vocals from Korean-Canadian indie artist JUNNY on "Daydream".

=== Photography ===
In 2017, Peniel held his first photography exhibition, titled "Penography", at White Studio gallery in Yeongdeungpo-gu, Seoul from March 30 to April 12. "Penography" is a compound word of his name, Peniel and photography, and contains Peniel's thoughts of showing a picture containing his own gaze and color.

Peniel also led the photography for bandmate Lee Chang-sub's debut Japanese EP bpm 82.5.

In 2018, Peniel held his second photography exhibition, "Second Penography", at Gallery Qum in Seongdong District, Seoul from November 23 to December 2.

In 2026, EXID member Park Jeonghwa credited Peniel as the photographer for the cover image of her single "Sun Love".

=== Other activities ===
In 2016, Peniel began to update his fans with his official vlog channel, POV. The channel features activities from his daily life.

In 2019, Peniel was selected to host an English K-Pop radio show, Skool of K-Pop on tbs eFM starting February 25.

On February 12, 2020, Peniel was cast in the Dive Studios variety program Hwaiting!. The program aired on Facebook Watch from February to April. In July, he began hosting the Dive Studios podcast Get Real alongside BM (of Kard) and Ashley Choi (formerly of Ladies' Code).

In February 2023, Peniel co-founded the fashion label CEEBS. His involvement with the brand was only revealed on February 9, 2024, via his personal Instagram page.

== Personal life ==
In November 2016, Peniel participated as a guest in the South Korean reality show KBS2's Hello Counselor episode 299, opening up about suffering from Alopecia areata. In the broadcast, he took off his hat and unveiled the head with sparse hair, further stating: "I concealed my hair loss for five years, and during those five years I kept wearing a hat for two-to-three years. It was very frustrating because I could not tell the truth. 70% of my hair was missing due to stress-related hair loss. The broadcast was natural and my close friends knew, It was very frustrating, but I finally made it public through Hello, so I feel really comfortable." He said, "At first, my hair-stylist noticed it, but later it got worse. The hospital said it was difficult to treat...I pushed my hair back all and I didn't care, but I'm getting a little bit out of it." As for the reason that he has not disclosed hair loss so far, Peniel said, "I just wanted to go confidently, but I had to hide it for five years after my debut considering the company, members and fans." After the confession, BtoB members leaving affectionate support posts on their Instagram, such as Yook Sung-jae's "Peniel, you got the sweetest heart in the world. We got your back, just stay with us as you are."

== Discography ==
=== As lead artist ===
Title	Year	Peak chart positions	Album
Title	Year	KOR Down.	Album
"That Girl"	2017	—	Piece of BTOB Volume 3
"B.O.D"	2019	—	Digital singles
"Fly23"	2019	—	Digital singles
"Flip"	2019	—	Digital singles
"Valentine"	2021	151	Digital singles
"MloBI (Make It or Break It)"	2024	124	Story of my L:ife
"Daydream" (feat Junny)	2024	86	Story of my L:ove
"IDKI"	2026	—	Non-album single
Collaborations
"Heartbreak In Heaven" (with Tzuyu)	2024	—	AbouTZU

=== Mixtapes ===
Year	Title	Track listing
2016	HOMESICK MIXTAPE VOL.1	1. Repeat (ft. Legaci); 2. Body Roll; 3. Homesick; 4. 1Up On Milhouse (ft. Typoh); 5. Farewell (ft. KO)

== Filmography ==
=== Television series ===
Year	Title	Role	Notes
2014	The Heirs	Himself	Cameo (Episode 4)
2025	XO, Kitty	Joon-ho Moon	Guest role

=== Variety shows ===
Year	Title	Notes	Ref.
2013	Pops in Seoul	Main host	
2017	Law of the Jungle in Sumatra	Cast member	

=== As a music video director ===
Year	Title	Artist	Ref.
2016	"Stand By Me"	BtoB Blue	

== Radio show ==
Year	Title	Notes	Ref.
2019	Skool of K-Pop	DJ; February 25, 2019 – April 26, 2020	
