= List of Weekly Idol episodes =

Weekly Idol (Korean: 주간 아이돌; RR: Jugan aidol) is a South Korean variety show, which aired on Wednesdays at 6:20 PM KST on MBC M, and 12:00 AM KST on MBC Every1, MBC's cable and satellite networks for its first five seasons.

For its first season, the show was hosted by comedian Jung Hyung-don and rapper Defconn.

The second season, which debuted on April 11, 2018, was hosted by former Roo'ra member Lee Sang-min and comedians Yoo Se-yoon & Kim Shin-young.

The third season, which debuted on January 9, 2019, was hosted by comedians Jo Se-ho & Nam Chang-hee and ZE:A's Hwang Kwang-hee. On February 12, 2020, it was announced that Jo Se-ho and Nam Chang-hee would leave their hosting roles, and there would be special MCs recruited to join Hwang Kwang-hee in hosting each episode, starting from the episode on February 19 until the episode on April 15. On April 17, it was announced that Super Junior's Eunhyuk would join as fixed host with Hwang Kwang-hee, starting from the episode on April 22.

On April 4, 2023, it was announced that Hwang Kwang-hee and Eunhyuk would leave their hosting roles after the episode on April 12, and BtoB's Seo Eun-kwang and Lovelyz's Mijoo would replace the former two beginning the episode on April 19; this marked the beginning of Season 4. A reorganisation of the show happened beginning the episode on November 1, 2023, and Mukbang YouTuber Heebab would join the fixed cast lineup only during the mukbang section. On December 26, 2023, it was announced that Seo Eun-kwang and Lee Mi-joo would leave their hosting roles, with their last episode airing the next day, and this marked the end of Season 4.

On January 2, 2024 it was announced that Boom and Golden Child's Lee Jang-jun would be the new hosts, beginning the episode on January 17, which would also be the beginning of Season 5.

The show went on a six-month hiatus after the episode on December 25, 2024, before confirming its return on June 6, 2025, as Season 6, with Monsta X's Minhyuk and Cravity's Hyeongjun named the new MCs. The season will also be aired in a new timeslot of Fridays at 5:30 PM KST on MBC M, and 11:30 PM KST on MBC Every1.

== 2011 ==
List of episodes (2011)

No. in overall	No. in season	Air Date	Featured guests	Notes
Season 1 - Hosts: Jeong Hyeong-don, Defconn
1	1	July 23	—	'Real Chart! Idol Self-Ranking' corner only
2	2	July 30	—	'Real Chart! Idol Self-Ranking' corner only
3	3	August 6	—	'Real Chart! Idol Self-Ranking' corner only
4	4	August 13	Infinite	Introduced 'Idol of the Week' corner
5	5	August 20	MBLAQ	
6	6	August 27	ZE:A	
7	7	September 3	—	Non-guest Special: Beast
8	8	September 10	Sistar	
9	9	September 17	4Minute	
10	10	September 24	U-KISS	
11	11	October 1	G.NA	
12	12	October 8	CHI CHI	Special: Kara
13	13	October 15	Rainbow	
14	14	October 22	—	Non-guest Special: Girls' Generation
15	15	October 29	FT Island	
16	16	November 5	—	Non-guest Special: Kim Hyun-Joong
17	17	November 12	Orange Caramel	
18	18	November 19	Girl's Day	
19	19	November 26	Secret	
20	20	December 3	Infinite, G.NA	Unaired Scenes from Ep.4 and Ep.11
21	21	December 10	Rainbow, MBLAQ	Unaired Scenes from Ep.5 and Ep.13
22	22	December 17	Wonder Girls	
23	23	December 24	Infinite	
24	24	December 31	—	1st Weekly Idol Awards

== 2012 ==
List of episodes (2012)

No. in overall	No. in season	Air Date	Featured guests	Notes
25	25	January 7	Apink	
26	26	January 14	B1A4	
27	27	January 21	Boyfriend	
28	28	January 28	Dal Shabet	
29	29	February 4	T-ara (except Jiyeon and Eunjung)	
30	30	February 11	MBLAQ	
31	31	February 18	Teen Top	
32	32	February 25	Teen Top	Special Appearance: Andy (Shinhwa)
33	33	March 3	Jay Park	
34	34	March 14	FT Island	
35	35	March 21	Miss A	
36	36	March 28	Miss A	
37	37	April 4	Haha	
38	38	April 11	Haha	
39	39	April 18	2AM	
40	40	April 25	B1A4	
41	41	May 2	SHINee	
42	42	May 9	SHINee	
43	43	May 16	4Minute, BtoB	
44	44	May 23	Apink	
45	45	May 30	Hyungdon and Daejun	Special MCs: Haha, Sistar (Hyolyn, Soyou)
46	46	June 6	Nine Muses	
47	47	June 13	Infinite	
48	48	June 20	Infinite	
49	49	June 27	Teen Top	
50	50	July 4	G.NA	
51	51	July 11	f(x)	
52	52	July 18	After School	Weekly Idol 1st Anniversary
53	53	July 25	After School	Weekly Idol 1st Anniversary
54	54	August 1	Hello Venus, NU'EST	
55	55	August 8	Skull & Haha	
56	56	August 15	Infinite	
57	57	August 22	B.A.P	
58	58	August 29	Beast	
59	59	September 5	Beast	
60	60	September 12	Super Junior (Leeteuk, Eunhyuk, Ryeowook, Kyuhyun)	
61	61	September 19	Super Junior (Leeteuk, Eunhyuk, Ryeowook, Kyuhyun)	
62	62	September 26	Secret	
63	63	October 3	Secret	
64	64	October 10	Tasty, Hyungdon and Daejun	Special MCs: Infinite (Sungkyu, Hoya)
65	65	October 17	ZE:A	
66	66	October 24	BtoB	
67	67	October 31	Orange Caramel	
68	68	November 7	Spica, Fiestar	
69	69	November 14	Miss A	
70	70	November 21	Miss A	Special MC: Ilhoon (BtoB)
71	71	November 28	Block B	
72	72	December 5	Jewelry	Special MC: Ilhoon (BtoB)
73	73	December 12	B1A4,	Special Appearance: Hyukjin (100%)
74	74	December 19	Girl's Day	Special MC: Ilhoon (BtoB)
75	75	December 26	Sunggyu (Infinite), Ilhoon (BtoB)	2nd Weekly Idol Awards; Special MC: Sohyun (4Minute)

== 2013 ==
List of episodes (2013)

No. in overall	No. in season	Air Date	Featured guests	Notes
76	76	January 2	Ailee	
77	77	January 9	Yang Yo-seob (Beast)	
78	78	January 16	Hello Venus	
79	79	January 23	INFINITE H	
80	80	January 30	2Yoon, Sohyun (4Minute)	Special MC: Ilhoon (BtoB)
81	81	February 6	Nine Muses	
82	82	February 13	Dal Shabet	
83	83	February 20	Sistar19	
84	84	February 27	Huh Gak, Hyungdon and Daejun	Special MCs: Sohyun (4Minute), Ilhoon (BtoB)
85	85	March 6	B.A.P	Special Appearance: Kim Bohyung (Spica)
86	86	March 13, 2013	Rainbow	
87	87	March 20	4Minute	Special MC: Ilhoon (BtoB)
88	88	March 27	4Minute	Special MC: Ilhoon (BtoB)
89	89	April 3	SHINee	Minho is absent
90	90	April 10	SHINee	Minho is absent
91	91	April 17	Speed (Special Corner Segment), Teen Top	Special MC: Ilhoon (BtoB)
92	92	April 24	RaNia	
93	93	May 1	INFINITE	
94	94	May 8	INFINITE	
95	95	May 15	Secret	
96	96	May 22	15&	
97	97	May 29	B1A4	
98	98	June 5	BtoB	
99	99	June 12	100%	
100	100	June 19	Rainbow, Secret, 4Minute	100th Episode Special
101	101	June 26	Rainbow, Secret, 4Minute	
102	102	July 3	MBLAQ	
103	103	July 10	Exo	
104	104	July 17	Apink	
105	105	July 24	Girl's Day	Weekly Idol 2nd Anniversary
106	106	July 31	Jewelry	
107	107	August 7	INFINITE	Summer Special 1
108	108	August 14	Exo	Summer Special 2
109	109	August 21	Beast	Summer Special 3
110	110	August 28	Beast	Summer Special 3
111	111	September 4	B.A.P	Summer Special 4
112	112	September 11	Tasty	Special Appearance: Defconn; Special MC: Bomi (Apink)
113	113	September 18	BtoB	Chuseok Special
114	114	September 25	A-JAX, 2EYES	
115	115	October 2	Teen Top	
116	116	October 9	Henry (Super Junior-M)	Special Appearance: Kyuhyun (Super Junior)
117	117	October 16	Ladies' Code	
118	118	October 23	Block B	
119	119	October 30	Spica	
120	120	November 6	IU	
121	121	November 13	IU	
122	122	November 20	K.Will	
123	123	November 27	Park Ji-yoon, Lim Kim	
124	124	December 4	G-Dragon	
125	125	December 11	G-Dragon	
126	126	December 18	Shin Bora	
127	127	December 25	Bomi (Apink), Ilhoon (BtoB), P.O. (Block B)	3rd Weekly Idol Awards

== 2014 ==
List of episodes (2014)

No. in overall	No. in season	Air Date	Featured guests	Notes
128	128	January 1	Kim Hee-chul (Super Junior)	
129	129	January 8	Yong Jun-hyung (Beast)	
130	130	January 15	Secret	
131	131	January 22	AOA	
132	132	January 29	Rainbow Blaxx	
133	133	February 5	History	
134	134	February 12	Girl's Day	
135	135	February 19	B1A4	
136	136	February 26	BtoB	
137	137	March 5	B.A.P	
138	138	March 12	Gain (Brown Eyed Girls)	
139	139	March 19	CNBLUE	
140	140	March 26	CNBLUE	
141	141	April 2	4Minute	
142	142	April 9	Apink	
143	143	April 16	Crayon Pop	
144	144	April 30	BTS	
145	145	May 7	Bestie, 100%	
146	146	May 14	Got7	
147	147	May 21	G.NA	Special Appearance: Ilhoon (BtoB)
148	148	May 28	Jun Hyoseong (Secret)	
149	149	June 4	Jiyeon (T-ara)	
150	150	June 11	Wheesung	
151	151	June 18	Beast	
152	152	June 25	INFINITE	INFINITE's 10th Appearance Special
153	153	July 2	INFINITE	
154	154	July 9	AOA	
155	155	July 16	Jung Joon-young	
156	156	July 23	Got7, Apink (Bomi, Namjoo, Hayoung), BtoB, Rainbow, Beast (Doojoon, Yoseob, Dongwoon)	Weekly Idol 3rd Anniversary
157	157	July 30	4Minute, Hyomin (T-ara), Nine Muses (Hyuna, Euaerin, Sungah, Kyungri), Boyfriend, FT Island (Jonghoon, Jaejin, Seunghyun), CNBLUE (Jonghyun, Minhyuk), AOA	Weekly Idol 3rd Anniversary
158	158	August 6	HyunA (4Minute)	
159	159	August 13	B1A4	
160	160	August 20	Big Byung (Sungjae (BtoB), N (VIXX), Hyuk (VIXX), Jackson (Got7))	
161	161	August 27	Tiny-G	
162	162	September 3	Kara	
163	163	September 10	Kara	
164	164	September 17	NU'EST, Fiestar	
165	165	September 24	T-ara	
166	166	October 1	Kim Jong-min (Koyote)	
167	167	October 8	Teen Top	
168	168	October 15	Red Velvet	
169	169	October 22	Winner	
170	170	October 29	VIXX	
171	171	November 5	Orange Caramel	
172	172	November 12	Song Jieun (Secret)	Special Appearance: Jung Hana (Secret)
173	173	November 19	AOA	
174	174	November 26	Boyfriend	
175	175	December 3	Apink	
176	176	December 10	Kim Ian, Changjo (Teen Top)	Special Appearance: Sweden Laundry
177	177	December 17	Got7	
178	178	December 24	EXID	
179	179	December 31	Big Byung (Sungjae (BtoB), N (VIXX), Hyuk (VIXX), Jackson (Got7))	4th Weekly Idol Awards; Special MC: Bomi (Apink), Ilhoon (BtoB)

== 2015 ==
List of episodes (2015)

No. in overall	No. in season	Air Date	Featured guests	Notes
180	180	January 7	Hong Jin-young	
181	181	January 14	Boys Republic	
182	182	January 21	Junggigo, Mad Clown, Jooyoung	
183	183	January 28	Lizzy (After School)	Special Appearance: Eunkwang (BtoB)
184	184	February 4	Nine Muses	
185	185	February 11	4Minute	
186	186	February 18	Jung Yong-hwa (CNBLUE)	
187	187	February 25	Big Byung (Sungjae (BtoB), Hyuk (VIXX), Jackson (Got7)), Chamsonyeo (G.NA, Sohyun (4Minute), Youngji (Kara))	N (VIXX, Big Byung) and Lizzy (After School, Chamsonyeo) are absent
188	188	March 4	Niel (Teen Top)	Special Appearance: Teen Top (C.A.P, L.Joe, Ricky)
189	189	March 11	Rainbow	
190	190	March 18	Lovelyz	
191	191	March 25	Boyfriend	
192	192	April 1	Apink	Weekly Idol in Saipan Special in honor of MBC Media Plus 14th Anniversary
193	193	April 8	Apink	Weekly Idol in Saipan Special in honor of MBC Media Plus 14th Anniversary
194	194	April 15	Berry Good, GFriend	
195	195	April 22	K.Will	
196	196	April 29	FT Island	
197	197	May 6	EXID	
198	198	May 13	CLC	
199	199	May 20	Kim Sung-kyu (INFINITE)	
200	200	May 27	Secret (Hana, Jieun), AOA (Jimin, ChoA), Sistar (Bora, Soyou), Sonamoo, Monsta X, N.Flying (Lee Seung-hyub, Kim Jae-hyun)	200th Episode Special
201	201	June 3	Secret (Hana, Jieun), AOA (Jimin, ChoA), Sistar (Bora, Soyou), Sonamoo, Monsta X, N.Flying (Lee Seung-hyub, Kim Jae-hyun)	200th Episode Special
202	202	June 10	Kara	
203	203	June 17	UNIQ (First half corner), BTS (Main Guest)	
204	204	June 24	AOA	
205	205	July 1	Teen Top	
206	206	July 8	BtoB	
207	207	July 15	INFINITE	Summer Special 1
208	208	July 22	Apink	Summer Special 2
209	209	July 29	Beast	Summer Special 3
210	210	August 5	Girl's Day	Summer Special 4
211	211	August 12	Wonder Girls	Summer Special 5
212	212	August 19	Girls' Generation	Summer Special 6
213	213	August 26	Girls' Generation	Summer Special 6
214	214	September 2	Mamamoo	
215	215	September 9	April	Rookie Special 1 Special Appearance: Rainbow (Seungah, Jisook)
216	216	September 16	Monsta X	Rookie Special 2
217	217	September 23	Red Velvet	Rookie Special 3
218	218	September 30	CNBLUE	
219	219	October 7	Lovelyz	
220	220	October 14	Got7	
221	221	October 21	GFriend	
222	222	October 28	Seventeen	
223	223	November 4	Oh My Girl	
224	224	November 11	Brown Eyed Girls	
225	225	November 18	N.Flying	
226	226	November 25	EXID	
227	227	December 2	VIXX	Special MC: Sungkyu (INFINITE)
228	228	December 9	Twice	Special MC: Sungkyu (INFINITE)
229	229	December 16	BTS	Special MC: Kim Heechul (Super Junior)
230	230	December 23	Lovelyz (Jisoo, Kei, Sujeong), GFriend (Yerin, Yuju, SinB), Twice (Nayeon, Dahyun, Tzuyu)	Christmas Special; Special MC: Kim Heechul (Super Junior)
231	231	December 30	Oh Ha-young (Apink), N (VIXX), Mina (AOA)	5th Weekly Idol Awards; Special MC: Yoon Bo-mi (Apink)

== 2016 ==
List of episodes (2016)

No. in overall	No. in season	Air Date	Featured guests	Notes
232	232	January 6	Lovelyz	Special MC: Sunny (Girls' Generation)
233	233	January 13	UP10TION	Special MC: Sunny (Girls' Generation)
234	234	January 20	Dal Shabet	Special MC: Leeteuk (Super Junior)
235	235	January 27	Tahiti, The Legend	Special MC: Leeteuk (Super Junior)
236	236	February 3	GFriend	Lunar New Year Special; Special MC: Jung Yong-hwa (CNBLUE)
237	237	February 10	Shin Hye-sung (Shinhwa)	Special MC: Andy (Shinhwa)
238	238	February 17	Noel	Special MC: Jung Yong-hwa (CNBLUE)
239	239	February 24	AOA Cream	Special MC: Yoon Doo-joon (Beast)
240	240	March 2	Mamamoo	Special MC: Yoon Doo-joon (Beast)
241	241	March 9	Fiestar	Special MC: K.Will
242	242	March 16	Red Velvet	Special MC: K.Will
243	243	March 23	Cosmic Girls	Special MC: Yoon Bo-mi (Apink)
244	244	March 30	Block B	Special MC: Yoon Bo-mi (Apink)
245	245	April 6	Junhyung (Beast), Bora (Sistar), Solji (EXID), Jackson (Got7)	First episode with Heechul (Super Junior) and Hani (EXID) as temporary MCs
246	246	April 13	Laboum	Jackson (Got7), Dahyun (Twice), and Jooheon (Monsta X) as "Idols Are the Best" corner MCs
247	247	April 20	J.Y. Park	Special Appearance: Jackson (Got7) (248)
248	248	April 27	J.Y. Park	Special Appearance: Jackson (Got7) (248)
249	249	May 4	Twice	Jackson (Got7), Dahyun (Twice), Jooheon (Monsta X), and SinB (GFriend) as "Idols Are the Best" corner MCs
250	250	May 11	Lovelyz	Jackson (Got7), Jooheon (Monsta X), and SinB (GFriend) as "Idols Are the Best" corner MCs
251	251	May 18	AOA	
252	252	May 25	Lee Hi	Jackson (Got7), Dahyun (Twice), Jooheon (Monsta X), and SinB (GFriend) as "Idols Are the Best" corner MCs
253	253	June 1	AKMU	
254	254	June 8	EXID	Jackson (Got7), Dahyun (Twice), Jooheon (Monsta X), and SinB (GFriend) as "Idols Are the Best" corner MCs
255	255	June 15	DIA	Jackson (Got7), Dahyun (Twice), Jooheon (Monsta X), and SinB (GFriend) as "Idols Are the Best" corner MCs
256	256	June 22	4TEN, ASTRO, KNK	Super Rookies Special 1
257	257	June 29	Beast	
258	258	July 6	Beast	Jackson (Got7), Dahyun (Twice), Jooheon (Monsta X), and SinB (GFriend) as "Idols Are the Best" corner MCs
259	259	July 13	GFriend, Gugudan	Hani is absent
260	260	July 20	Sungkyu (Infinite), Yoon Bo-mi (Apink), Ilhoon (BtoB), Jackson (Got7)	Weekly Idol 5th Anniversary; BamBam (Got7) is absent and Jackson (Got7) is absent in episode 262
261	261	July 27	BtoB, Got7, GFriend, Twice	Weekly Idol 5th Anniversary; BamBam (Got7) is absent and Jackson (Got7) is absent in episode 262
262	262	August 3	BtoB, Got7, GFriend, Twice	Weekly Idol 5th Anniversary; BamBam (Got7) is absent and Jackson (Got7) is absent in episode 262
263	263	August 10	Oh My Girl, Got7	Got7's penalty dance
264	264	August 17	Jackson (Got7), Dahyun (Twice), Jooheon (Monsta X), SinB (GFriend)	"Idols Are the Best" Special
265	265	August 24	NCT 127	Jackson (Got7), Dahyun (Twice), Jooheon (Monsta X), and SinB (GFriend) as "Idols Are the Best" corner MCs
266	266	August 31	I.O.I	
267	267	September 7	Red Velvet	Jackson (Got7), Dahyun (Twice), Jooheon (Monsta X), and SinB (GFriend) as "Idols Are the Best" corner MCs
268	268	September 14	—	Chuseok Special
269	269	September 21	INFINITE	
270	270	September 28	Got7	Heechul and Hani's last episode as MCs
271	271	October 5	Apink	Jeong Hyeong-don's return as MC
272	272	October 12	SHINee	
273	273	October 19	Dal Shabet, DIA	
274	274	October 26	Twice	
275	275	November 2	—	Unrevealed Clips Special
276	276	November 9	BtoB	Jackson (Got7), Dahyun (Twice), and Jooheon (Monsta X) as "Idols Are the Best" corner MCs (SinB (GFriend) is absent)
277	277	November 16	Blackpink	
278	278	November 23	Kyuhyun (Super Junior)	Jackson (Got7), Dahyun (Twice), Jooheon (Monsta X), and Minhyuk (BtoB) as "Idols Are the Best" corner MCs (SinB (GFriend) is absent)
279	279	November 30	Astro	Jooheon (Monsta X), Minhyuk (BtoB), and Shownu (Monsta X) as "Idols Are the Best" corner MCs (Jackson (Got7), Dahyun (Twice) and SinB (GFriend) are absent)
280	280	December 7	Sechs Kies	
281	281	December 14	Sechs Kies	
282	282	December 21	Lee Jin-ah, Jung Seung-hwan, Kwon Jin-ah, Sam Kim	Christmas Special; Special Appearance: You Hee-yeol
283	283	December 28	Jackson (Got7), Jooheon (Monsta X), Junhyung (Highlight)	6th Weekly Idol Awards; Special MC: Dahyun (Twice), SinB (GFriend)

== 2017 ==
List of episodes (2017)

No. in overall	No. in season	Air Date	Featured guests	Notes
284	284	January 4	BigBang	
285	285	January 11	BigBang	
286	286	January 18	Shinhwa	
287	287	January 25	Shinhwa	
288	288	February 1	Pentagon, Victon, Momoland	Super Rookies Special 2
289	289	February 8	NCT 127	With BigBang extras
290	290	February 15	Bolbbalgan4	
291	291	February 22	Cosmic Girls	Masked Idol: Shownu (Monsta X), Seungjun (KNK), MJ (Astro), Dawon (SF9); WINNER: MJ
292	292	March 1	Lovelyz	Masked Idol: Shownu (Monsta X), Seungjun (KNK), Dawon (SF9), Seungwoo (Victon); WINNER: Shownu
293	293	March 8	GFriend	
294	294	March 15	GOT7	
295	295	March 22	Highlight	
296	296	March 29	Highlight	Special Appearance: KNK
297	297	April 5	Monsta X	Masked Idol: Seungjun (KNK), Dawon (SF9), Seungwoo (Victon), Hongseok (Pentagon); WINNER: Seungjun
298	298	April 12	Oh My Girl	Masked Idol: Dawon (SF9), Seungwoo (Victon), Kuhn (UP10tion); WINNER: Seungwoo
299	299	April 19	EXID (except Solji)	Masked Idol: Dawon (SF9), Kuhn (UP10tion), Dayoung (Cosmic Girls); WINNER: Kuhn
300	300	April 26	Hyungdon and Daejun	300th Episode Special; Special MC: Heechul (Super Junior), SinB (GFriend), Hani (EXID), Ilhoon (BTOB)
301	301	May 3	Winner	
302	302	May 10	Cross Gene, SF9	Super Rookies Special 3
303	303	May 17	Twice	
304	304	May 24	Twice	
305	305	May 31	Triple H	Masked Idol: Dawon (SF9), Hongseok (Pentagon), Dayoung (Cosmic Girls), Sungjin (Day6); WINNER: Sungjin
306	306	June 7	iKon	
307	307	June 14	Astro	Masked Idol: Dawon (SF9), Hongseok (Pentagon), Dayoung (Cosmic Girls), Shin (Cross Gene); WINNER: Shin
308	308	June 21	Seventeen	
309	309	June 28	Apink	
310	310	July 5	Blackpink	Masked Idol: Dawon (SF9), Hongseok (Pentagon), Dayoung (Cosmic Girls), Chaekyung (April); WINNER: Hongseok
311	311	July 12	Yoon Jong-shin, Kim Young-chul, Parc Jae-jung, Min-seo, Yoo Yong-min	Mystic Entertainment Special
312	312	July 19	B.I.G, MAP6, Matilda	Super Rookies Special 4
313	313	July 26	MAMAMOO, GFriend	Summer Vacation Special 1
314	314	August 2	Turbo	Summer Vacation Special 2
315	315	August 9	Wanna One	Summer Vacation Special 3
316	316	August 16	Wanna One	Summer Vacation Special 3
317	317	August 23	Sunmi, Kim Chung-ha	Female Solos Special
318	318	August 30	Raina, Han Dong-geun, NU'EST W, Pristin	Pledis Family Special
319	319	September 6	Raina, Han Dong-geun, NU'EST W, Pristin	Pledis Family Special
320	320	September 13	Weki Meki, Golden Child	Rookies Special; Special Appearance: GFriend
321	321	September 20	Dawon (SF9), Dayoung (Cosmic Girls), Chaekyung (April), Seungjun (KNK), Sungjin (DAY6), Shin (Cross Gene)	Masked Idol Season 1 Finale Special; Special Appearance: GFriend
322	322	September 27	B1A4	Special Appearance: GFriend
323	323	October 4	Highlight, Victon, Oh My Girl, GOT7	MBC Every1 10th Anniversary Special Part 1
324	324	October 11	GOT7, Sunmi, EXID (except Solji), Apink (Naeun, Namjoo, Hayoung)	MBC Every1 10th Anniversary Special Part 2
325	325	October 18	Apink (Naeun, Namjoo, Hayoung), Infinite (Dongwoo, Sungyeol, Sungjong), Highlight, K.Will	MBC Every1 10th Anniversary Special Part 3
326	326	October 25	Samuel, Jeong Se-woon, MXM, JBJ	Produce 101 Season 2 Reunion Special
327	327	November 1	Twice	
328	328	November 8	Super Junior (Leeteuk, Heechul, Yesung, Shindong, Eunhyuk, Donghae)	
329	329	November 15	Super Junior (Leeteuk, Heechul, Yesung, Shindong, Eunhyuk, Donghae)	
330	330	November 22	Block B	
331	331	November 29	Red Velvet	
332	332	December 6	Rain	
333	333	December 13	Uhm Jung-hwa	
334	334	December 20	EXID (except Solji)	Christmas Special; Special voice appearance by Solji through phone
335	335	December 27	Shin Hye-sung (Shinhwa), Super Junior (Leeteuk, Heechul, Yesung, Shindong, Eunhyuk, Donghae), iKON (except Bobby), Wanna One	7th Weekly Idol Awards

MJ (South Korean singer)

== 2018 ==
List of episodes (2018)

No. in overall	No. in season	Air Date	Featured guests	Notes
336	336	January 3	Jeonghwa (EXID), Monsta X (Minhyuk, Jooheon), Seventeen (DK, Mingyu), Kim Chung-ha	Companion Dogs Special
337	337	January 10	Infinite (except Sungyeol)	
338	338	January 17	Double V (Song Eun-i, Kim Sook)	
339	339	January 24	Hwanhee, Wheesung	
340	340	January 31	BoA	
341	341	February 7	iKON	
342	342	February 14	Seventeen	Lunar New Year Special
343	343	February 21	Celeb Five (Song Eun-i, Shin Bong-sun, Ahn Young-mi, Kim Young-hee, Kim Shin-young)	
344	344	February 28	N.Flying, Day6	God Tier Band Special
345	345	March 7	Mamamoo	
346	346	March 14	GOT7	
347	347	March 21	NCT	
348	348	March 28	Monsta X	Jeong Hyeong-don and Defconn's last episode as hosts
End of Season 1
349	349	April 4	—N/a	Special Repackage Broadcast; Narration by Ilhoon (BtoB)
Season 2 - Hosts: Yoo Se-yoon, Lee Sang-min, Kim Shin-young
350	1	April 11	NRG, Kan Mi-youn, JeA (Brown Eyed Girls), Bomi (Apink), JR (NU'EST), Ilhoon (BtoB), Moonbyul (Mamamoo), Solbin (Laboum), SinB (GFriend), Seventeen (Joshua, Wonwoo), Naeun (April), Choi Byung-chan, Momoland (Yeonwoo, JooE), Moonhee (BONUSBaby), Nayoung (Pristin), Kim Chung-ha, Wanna One (Yoon Ji-sung, Ha Sung-woon, Lee Dae-hwi, Lai Kuan-lin), Lee Sae-rom	
351	2	April 18	EXID (except Solji)	Weekly Thumb-dol: The Boyz (except Hwall)
352	3	April 25	VIXX	Weekly Thumb-dol: Snuper
353	4	May 2	GFriend	Weekly Thumb-dol: Hyeongseop X Euiwoong
354	5	May 9	Lovelyz	Weekly Thumb-dol: IN2IT
355	6	May 16	FOURever (Kim Tae-won, Kim Jong-seo, Kim Kyung-ho, Park Wan-kyu)	Weekly Thumb-dol: The East Light
356	7	May 23	Victon	Weekly Thumb-dol: Dreamcatcher
357	8	May 30	H1GHR Music Family (pH-1, Woogie, Sik-K, Woodie GoChild, HAON)	Weekly Thumb-dol: KHAN
358	9	June 6	Pristin V	Weekly Thumb-dol: fromis 9 (except Jang Gyu-ri)
359	10	June 13	Shinee	Yoo Se-yoon is absent due to change in schedule
360	11	June 20	Shinee, Bolbbalgan4	Weekly Thumb-dol: UNI.T; The SHINee segment continued from last week's episode
361	12	June 27	NU'EST W	Weekly Thumb-dol: ONF
362	13	July 4	Amoeba Culture Family (Rhythm Power, Ha:tfelt, Crush)	Weekly Thumb-dol: A.C.E (except Chan); Special voice appearances by Carlos Gorito and Gaeko through phone
363	14	July 11	Golden Child	Weekly Thumb-dol: Elris
364	15	July 18	Kim Chung-ha, Gugudan SEMINA	Summer Girls Special (Note: Summer Vacation Special 1)
365	16	July 25	Apink, Kim Chung-ha, Gugudan SEMINA	Summer Girls Special (cont.); Weekly Idol 8th Anniversary Special (Note: Summer Vacation Special 2)
366	17	August 1	Apink	Weekly Idol 8th Anniversary Special (cont.)
367	18	August 8	Leo (VIXX), Laboum, GFriend	National Representative P.R.O Event-dol Special (Note: Summer Vacation Special 3)
368	19	August 15	Super Junior-D&E	Summer Vacation Special 4
369	20	August 22	Red Velvet	Summer Vacation Special 5
370	21	August 29	Brand New Music Family (Rhymer, Hanhae, Kanto, MXM, MC Gree)	Weekly Thumb-dol: Berry Good; Summer Vacation Special 6
371	22	September 5	NCT Dream	Special MC: Sungjong (Infinite); Kim Shin-young is absent
372	23	September 12	The Boyz	
373	24	September 19	Nam Woo-hyun (Infinite), Oh My Girl	Autumn Man and Women Special
374	25	September 26	DIA, UNI.T (except ZN)	Chuseok Special
375	26	October 3	Yuri (Girls' Generation)	Weekly Thumb-dol: GWSN
376	27	October 10	iKon	
377	28	October 17	Weki Meki, fromis 9	Starting from this episode, broadcast time for the show has changed to every Wednesday at 5pm KST
378	29	October 24	NCT 127	
379	30	October 31	Iz*One	
380	31	November 7	Monsta X	
381	32	November 14	Stray Kids	
382	33	November 21	Key (Shinee)	
383	34	November 28	EXID	
384	35	December 5	Lovelyz	Lee Sang-min, Yoo Se-yoon and Kim Shin-young's last episode as hosts
End of Season 2
385	36	December 12	—N/a	Special Broadcast Part 1
386	37	December 19	—N/a	Special Broadcast Part 2
387	38	December 26	—N/a	Special Broadcast Part 3

== 2019 ==
List of episodes (2019)

No. in overall	No. in season	Air Date	Featured guests	Notes
388	39	January 2	—N/a	Special Broadcast Part 4
Season 3 - Hosts: Nam Chang-hee, Jo Se-ho (389-446), Hwang Kwang-hee (389-608), Eunhyuk (456-608)
389	1	January 9	Oh My Girl (Hyojung, Seunghee, Arin), NCT (Taeyong, Doyoung, Jungwoo)	
390	2	January 16	Cosmic Girls	Cosmic Girls members Xuanyi, Cheng Xiao, and Meiqi are absent
391	3	January 23	Luna (f(x)), Lee Min-hyuk (BtoB)	
392	4	January 30	CLC	
393	5	February 6	GFriend (Sowon, Yerin, Eunha, SinB), Kim Dong-han	Special MC: Heo Cham; Lunar New Year Special: Weekly Entertainment Center
394	6	February 13	ONF	
395	7	February 20	Monsta X	
396	8	February 27	Yoon Ji-sung	Special voice appearance by Lee Dae-hwi
397	9	March 6	Ha Sung-woon (Hotshot)	
398	10	March 13	SF9	SF9 member Zuho is absent
399	11	March 20	Wooseok x Kuanlin	
400	12	March 27	Momoland	Momoland members Taeha and Daisy are absent
401	13	April 3	Stray Kids	
402	14	April 10	Iz*One	
403	15	April 17	1the9	
404	16	April 24	Lee Seung-hyub (N.Flying), Moonbin (Astro), Juyeon (The Boyz)	
405	17	May 1	NU'EST	
406	18	May 8	Oh My Girl	Oh My Girl member Mimi is present only for the performance of the currently promoting title song
407	19	May 15	EXID	
408	20	May 22	AB6IX	
409	21	May 29	Lovelyz	
410	22	June 5	NCT 127	
411	23	June 12	Cosmic Girls	Cosmic Girls members Xuanyi, Cheng Xiao, and Meiqi are absent
412	24	June 19	Ateez, Oneus	
413	25	June 26	(G)I-dle	
414	26	July 3	GFriend	
415	27	July 10	Day6	
416	28	July 17	Pentagon	Pentagon member Yan An is absent
417	29	July 24	CIX	
418	30	July 31	NCT Dream	NCT Dream member Jisung is absent
419	31	August 7	Itzy	
420	32	August 14	HoooW, (Note: Duo formed by g.o.d's Son Ho-young and Kim Tae-woo) JBJ95	
421	33	August 21	The Boyz	The Boyz member Hwall is absent
422	34	August 28	Red Velvet	
423	35	September 4	Weki Meki, Everglow	Weki Meki members Ji Su-yeon and Kim Do-yeon are absent
424	36	September 11	—N/a	Chuseok Special Highlights Broadcast
425	37	September 18	Astro (MJ, Rocky), Kim Kook-heon, Song Yuvin	
426	38	September 25	Celeb Five	
427	39	October 2	Jang Woo-hyuk (H.O.T.)	Special appearances by ONF (Hyojin, Wyatt) and Ateez (Yunho, Wooyoung)
428	40	October 9	Stray Kids	
429	41	October 16	Ateez	
430	42	October 23	Kei (Lovelyz), Siyeon (Dreamcatcher), Heejin (Loona)	
431	43	October 30	Monsta X	
432	44	November 6	Brown Eyed Girls	
433	45	November 13	Cosmic Girls	Cosmic Girls members Xuanyi, Cheng Xiao, and Meiqi are absent
434	46	November 20	Astro	Astro member Moonbin is absent
435	47	November 27	Nature	Nature member Aurora is absent
436	48	December 4	Golden Child	
437	49	December 11	CIX	
438	50	December 18	Parc Jae-jung, Jeong Se-woon, Kim Kook-heon (B.O.Y)	Year End Concert Special
439	51	December 25	Kim Jae-hwan	Special MC: Shindong (Super Junior); Jo Se-ho is absent

== 2020 ==
List of episodes (2020)

No. in overall	No. in season	Air Date	Featured guests	Notes
440	52	January 1	Oh My Girl (Hyojung, Seunghee, Binnie, Arin), Stray Kids (Bang Chan, Lee Know, Hyunjin, Han)	JoGakNam Doljanchi Special
441	53	January 8	B.O.Y, Kim Dong-han, Roh Tae-hyun (HOTSHOT)	2020 JAJA (Note: Janghang-dong A Studio Jugan Aidol (Weekly Idol) Awards)
442	54	January 15	Verivery	
443	55	January 22	—N/a	Lunar New Year Highlights Special: Idols who shined in 2019 Weekly Idol
444	56	January 29	Super Junior (Shindong, Eunhyuk, Donghae, Ryeowook)	
445	57	February 5	Super Junior (Shindong, Eunhyuk, Donghae, Ryeowook)	
446	58	February 12	Cho Hang-jo, Kim Yong-im, Kum Jan-di, Park Ku-yoon, Park Hye-shin, Jo Jung-min, Park Seo-jin	Jo Se-ho and Nam Chang-hee's last episode as hosts I'm A Trot Singer Special
447	59	February 19	GFriend	Special MC: Eunhyuk (Super Junior)
448	60	February 26	Everglow	Special MC: Lee Yi-kyung
449	61	March 4	Loona	Loona member Haseul is absent Special MC: Oh My Girl (Hyojung, Seunghee)
450	62	March 11	Itzy	Special MC: Hong Hyun-hee
451	63	March 18	Astro (Moonbin, Yoon San-ha), Kangmin (Verivery)	Show Champion MC Special; Special MC: Shin Bong-sun; Part of March 11's episode continued in this episode
452	64	March 25	NCT 127	Special MC: Park Ji-sun, Parc Jae-jung
453	65	April 1	NCT 127	Special MC: Park Ji-sun, Parc Jae-jung
454	66	April 8	Oneus	Special MC: Monsta X (Minhyuk, Kihyun)
455	67	April 15	Cravity	Special MC: Heo Kyung-hwan
456	68	April 22	Got7	First episode with Eunhyuk (Super Junior) as main MC
457	69	April 29	Oh My Girl	
458	70	May 6	(G)I-DLE	
459	71	May 13	Monsta X	
460	72	May 20	NCT Dream	
461	73	May 27	TXT	
462	74	June 3	NCT 127	
463	75	June 10	BtoB (Seo Eun-kwang, Peniel)	
464	76	June 17	Super Junior-K.R.Y.	
465	77	June 24	Golden Child	Part of June 17's episode continued in this episode
466	78	July 1	AB6IX	
467	79	July 8	Koyote, Verivery	
468	80	July 15	GFriend	
469	81	July 22	Red Velvet - Irene & Seulgi	
470	82	July 29	April	
471	83	August 5	ONF	
472	84	August 12	Ateez	
473	85	August 19	Itzy	
474	86	August 26	CLC, Cravity	
475	87	September 2	Super Junior-D&E	Special MC: Leeteuk (Super Junior)
476	88	September 9	Lovelyz	
477	89	September 16	Stray Kids	
478	90	September 23	The Boyz, Super Five (Note: Special trot quintet formed through MBC program Favourite Entertainment. The quintet consists of Hyeokjin (A.cian), Hui (Pentagon), MJ (Astro), Park Hyung-seok and Ok Jin-wook.)	Special MC (for The Boyz): NCT (Johnny, Haechan)
479	91	September 30	Treasure	
480	92	October 7	—N/a	Chuseok Special Highlights Broadcast: 2020 Corner King
481	93	October 14	WEi	
482	94	October 21	WJSN Chocome, Cignature	
483	95	October 28	TXT	
484	96	November 4	Monsta X	
485	97	November 11	GFriend	
486	98	November 18	BAE173	
487	99	November 25	BtoB 4U	
488	100	December 2	Got7	
489	101	December 9	Super Junior	
490	102	December 16	Super Junior	
491	103	December 23	Enhypen	
492	104	December 30	Woo!ah!, Lunarsolar	

== 2021 ==
List of episodes (2021)

No. in overall	No. in season	Air Date	Featured guests	Notes
493	105	January 6	—N/a	2020 Weekly Idol Masterpieces Special
494	106	January 13	(G)I-dle	
495	107	January 20	Oneus	
496	108	January 27	Golden Child	
497	109	February 3	Dreamcatcher	
498	110	February 10	Cravity	
499	111	February 17	Cherry Bullet	
500	112	February 24	Super Junior (Shindong, Donghae), GFriend (Yerin, SinB), Oh My Girl (Hyojung, Mimi), Monsta X (Minhyuk, Hyungwon)	500th Episode Special
501	113	March 3	Rain, Ciipher	
502	114	March 10	ONF	
503	115	March 17	WEi	
504	116	March 24	Verivery	
505	117	March 31	Ateez	Song Min-gi of Ateez was absent
506	118	April 7	Pentagon	
507	119	April 14	WJSN	WJSN members Xuanyi, Cheng Xiao, and Meiqi are absent
508	120	April 21	Brave Girls	
509	121	April 28	AB6IX	
510	122	May 5	Itzy	
511	123	May 12	Enhypen	
512	124	May 19	Oh My Girl	Special MC: Shindong (Super Junior); Eunhyuk is absent
513	125	May 26	Aespa	
514	126	June 2	Monsta X	Starting from this episode, broadcast time for the show has changed to every Wednesday at 8pm KST on MBC M, and 12am KST on MBC Every1; Monsta X member Shownu is absent
515	127	June 9	TXT	
516	128	June 16	Fromis 9	
517	129	June 23	—N/a	No.1 Idol Who Wants To Be Seen Again Special #1 (BTS)
518	130	June 30	T1419 (Noa, Gunwoo, Kairi), Mirae (Lien, Lee Jun-hyuk, Son Dong-pyo), Omega X (Jaehan, Hangyeom, Yechan)	Rookie Boy Groups Special
519	131	July 7	NCT Dream	
520	132	July 14	SF9	
521	133	July 21	—N/a	No.1 Idol Who Wants To Be Seen Again Special #2 (Blackpink)
522	134	July 28	Dreamcatcher	
523	135	August 4	Golden Child	
524	136	August 11	The Boyz	
525	137	August 18	ONF	
526	138	August 25	Stray Kids	
527	139	September 1	CIX	
528	140	September 8	STAYC	
529	141	September 15	Ateez	
No broadcast on September 22 due to Chuseok
530	142	September 29	Itzy	
531	143	October 6	N.Flying	
532	144	October 13	Enhypen	
533	145	October 20	Super Junior-D&E	Special MC: Leeteuk (Super Junior)
534	146	October 27	T1419, Epex	
535	147	November 3	Laboum	
536	148	November 10	Astro (Moonbin, Yoon San-ha), Golden Child (Lee Jang-Jun, Hong Joo-chan), WEi (Kim Yo-han, Kim Dong-han)	
537	149	November 17	Oneus	
538	150	November 24	2AM	
539	151	December 1	Weki Meki	Weki Meki member Doyeon is absent
540	152	December 8	IVE	
541	153	December 15	ONF	
542	154	December 22	WJSN (Yeoreum, Dayoung), SF9 (Inseong, Dawon)	2021 K-Champ Awards with Weekly Idol Special

== 2022 ==
List of episodes (2022)

No. in overall	No. in season	Air Date	Featured guests	Notes
543	155	January 5	Xdinary Heroes	
544	156	January 12	WJSN Chocome	
545	157	January 19	P1Harmony	
546	158	January 26	Fromis 9	
547	159	February 2	Kep1er	Special MC: Minhyuk (Monsta X); Eunhyuk is absent
548	160	February 9	Viviz	Special MC: Minhyuk (Monsta X); Eunhyuk is absent
549	161	February 16	Cravity	
550	162	February 23	Nmixx	
551	163	March 2	STAYC	
552	164	March 9	Treasure	
553	165	March 16	WEi	Special MC: Seungmin (Stray Kids); Hwang Kwang-hee is absent
554	166	March 23	Stray Kids	Special MC: Kim Yo-han (WEi); Hwang Kwang-hee is absent
555	167	March 30	Oh My Girl	
556	168	April 6	IVE	
557	169	April 13	Dreamcatcher	Dreamcatcher member Yoohyeon is absent Special MC: Kim Yo-han (WEi); Eunhyuk is absent
558	170	April 20	DKZ, Just B	DKZ member Munik is absent
559	171	April 27	Verivery	
560	172	May 4	Moonbyul (Mamamoo), Purple Kiss	
561	173	May 11	Le Sserafim	
562	174	May 18	CLASS:y	
563	175	May 25	Pentagon (Shinwon, Wooseok), (G)I-dle (Yuqi, Shuhua), Golden Child (Lee Jang-jun, Hong Joo-chan), Drippin (Yunseong, Junho)	Company Special
564	176	June 1	Pentagon (Shinwon, Wooseok), (G)I-dle (Yuqi, Shuhua), Golden Child (Lee Jang-jun, Hong Joo-chan), Drippin (Yunseong, Junho)	Company Special
565	177	June 8	Lightsum	
566	178	June 15	Woo!ah!, Secret Number	
567	179	June 22	Loona	
568	180	June 29	Fromis 9	Special MC: Kyuhyun (Super Junior); Eunhyuk is absent
569	181	July 6	WJSN	WJSN members Xuanyi, Cheng Xiao, and Meiqi are absent
570	182	July 13	SF9	SF9 members Inseong, Youngbin and Rowoon are absent
571	183	July 20	Itzy	
572	184	July 27	Xdinary Heroes	
573	185	August 3	Ateez	
574	186	August 10	Golden Child	
575	187	August 17	Blitzers (Juhan, Jinhwa, Sya, Chris, Wooju), Omega X (Jaehan, Hangyeom, Taedong, Kevin, Hyuk, Yechan), BugAboo	Special MC: Changbin (Stray Kids); Eunhyuk is absent
576	188	August 24	IVE	Special MC: Heechul (Super Junior); Eunhyuk is absent
577	189	August 31	Billlie	Special MC: Heechul (Super Junior); Eunhyuk is absent
578	190	September 7	Oneus	
579	191	September 14	CIX	
580	192	September 21	Nmixx	
581	193	September 28	Cravity	
582	194	October 5	EXID	
583	195	October 12	Stray Kids	
584	196	October 19	Dreamcatcher	Special MC: Lee Jang-jun (Golden Child); Eunhyuk is absent
585	197	October 26	WEi	Special MC: Lee Jang-jun (Golden Child); Eunhyuk is absent
Broadcast scheduled for November 2 was postponed due to the national mourning period in light of the Seoul Halloween crowd crush
586	198	November 9	CLASS:y	
587	199	November 16	Drippin, Epex	
588	200	November 23	Nature	
589	201	November 30	Verivery	
590	202	December 7	Tempest	
591	203	December 14	Super Junior (Eunhyuk, Donghae), Hwang Kwang-hee (ZE:A), WJSN (SeolA, Soobin), Kino (Pentagon), Billlie (Moon Sua, Tsuki)	Early Christmas Special; Special MC: Lee Sung-jong (Infinite); Eunhyuk and Hwang Kwang-hee appeared as guests
592	204	December 21	Super Junior (Eunhyuk, Donghae), Hwang Kwang-hee (ZE:A), WJSN (SeolA, Soobin), Kino (Pentagon), Billlie (Moon Sua, Tsuki)	Early Christmas Special; Special MC: Lee Sung-jong (Infinite); Eunhyuk and Hwang Kwang-hee appeared as guests
593	205	December 28	Oneus (Keonhee, Hwanwoong), Secret Number (Dita, Minji), Xdinary Heroes (Gunil, Jooyeon)	2022 K-Champ Awards Special; Special MC: Jaechan (DKZ)

== 2023 ==
List of episodes (2023)

No. in overall	No. in season	Air Date	Featured guests	Notes
594	206	January 4	Stray Kids	This episode consisted of highlights from Stray Kids' previous appearances on the show (Eps. 554 and 583)
595	207	January 11	WayV	WayV members Winwin and Lucas are absent
596	208	January 18	Tri.be, Lapillus	Tri.be member Jinha and Lapillus member Bessie are absent
597	209	January 25	Kingdom, Mirae	
598	210	February 1	Viviz	
599	211	February 8	Dreamcatcher (JiU, SuA), Fromis 9 (Song Ha-young, Park Ji-won), Kwon Eun-bi	Valentine's Day Special
600	212	February 15	STAYC	
601	213	February 22	TNX	TNX member Junhyeok is absent Special MC: Seo Eun-kwang (BtoB); Eunhyuk is absent
602	214	March 1	Lucy	Special MC: Seo Eun-kwang (BtoB); Eunhyuk is absent
603	215	March 8	Cravity	
604	216	March 15	Cherry Bullet	
605	217	March 22	NMIXX	
606	218	March 29	Billlie	Special MC: Lee Jang-jun (Golden Child); Eunhyuk is absent
607	219	April 5	CSR, Xikers	
608	220	April 12	Kep1er	Hwang Kwang-hee and Eunhyuk's last episode as hosts
Season 4 - Hosts: Seo Eun-kwang (BtoB), Mijoo (Lovelyz)
609	1	April 19	BtoB (Im Hyun-sik, Peniel), Jung Seung-hwan, Kwon Jin-ah	New MCs' Special; First episode with Seo Eun-kwang (BtoB) and Mijoo (Lovelyz) as hosts
610	2	April 26	Xdinary Heroes	
611	3	May 3	iKon	
612	4	May 10	Oneus	
613	5	May 17	Verivery	Verivery member Minchan is absent
614	6	May 24	Dreamcatcher	
615	7	May 31	Secret Number	
616	8	June 7	CIX	
617	9	June 14	P1Harmony	
618	10	June 21	ATBO, 8Turn	
619	11	June 28	WEi	
620	12	July 5	T5	
621	13	July 12	Nmixx	
622	14	July 19	&Team	Special MC: Lee Min-hyuk (BtoB); Mijoo is absent
623	15	July 26	Zerobaseone	Special MC: Lee Jang-jun (Golden Child); Seo Eun-kwang is absent
624	16	August 2	BB Girls	
625	17	August 9	Treasure	
626	18	August 16	TAN	
627	19	August 23	Everglow	
628	20	August 30	N.SSign	
629	21	September 6	BoyNextDoor	
630	22	September 13	Cravity	
631	23	September 20	Evnne	
632	24	September 27	Fantasy Boys	
633	25	October 4	ONF	
634	26	October 11	Lightsum	
635	27	October 18	IVE	This episode consisted of highlights from IVE's previous appearances on the show (Eps. 540, 556 and 576)
Broadcast scheduled for October 25 was cancelled due to the show's re-organization
636	28	November 1	Golden Child	First episode with Heebab as fixed cast Golden Child member Y is absent due to military service
637	29	November 8	Kiss of Life	
638	30	November 15	Zerobaseone	
639	31	November 22	Zerobaseone; Ampers&One	The Zerobaseone segment continued from last week's episode
640	32	November 29	Dreamcatcher	
641	33	December 6	Blackswan, Xodiac (Hyunsik, Zayyan, Sing, Leo)	
642	34	December 13	ONF (E-Tion, Wyatt), Oneus (Keonhee, Hwanwoong), Cravity (Wonjin, Seongmin), Mirae (Lee Jun-hyuk, Son Dong-pyo)	Early Christmas Special
643	35	December 20	ONF (E-Tion, Wyatt), Oneus (Keonhee, Hwanwoong), Cravity (Wonjin, Seongmin), Mirae (Lee Jun-hyuk, Son Dong-pyo)	Early Christmas Special
644	36	December 27	XG	Seo Eun-kwang and Lee Mi-joo's last episode as hosts, and Heebab's last episode as fixed guest

== 2024 ==
List of episodes (2024)

No. in overall	No. in season	Air Date	Featured guests	Notes
The broadcast scheduled for January 3 was cancelled due to the show's re-organization
645	37	January 10	No Guests	Special episode with the best moments of the show's 13-year history
Season 5 - Hosts: Boom, Lee Jang-jun (Golden Child)
646	1	January 17	SF9	First episode with Boom and Lee Jang-jun (Golden Child) as hosts SF9 member Jaeyoon is absent due to military service
647	2	January 24	TWS	
648	3	January 31	Nmixx	
649	4	February 7	JD1 (Jeong Dong-won)	
650	5	February 14	P1Harmony	
651	6	February 21	The Wind, All(H)Ours	The Wind member An Chan-won is absent due to health issues
652	7	February 28	Cravity	
653	8	March 6	NCT Wish	
654	9	March 13	Tempest	Tempest member Hwarang is absent due to hiatus
655	10	March 20	N.SSign	N.SSign members Hyun and Doha are absent due to health issues
656	11	March 27	Illit	
657	12	April 3	Kiss of Life	
658	13	April 10	Unis	
659	14	April 17	BoyNextDoor	
660	15	April 24	Drippin; Epex	This episode was split into 2 parts, with the 2 groups appearing separately Drippin member Joo Chang-uk is absent due to health issues
661	16	May 1	Xdinary Heroes	
662	17	May 8	TripleS	
663	18	May 15	Fantasy Boys	
664	19	May 22	Zerobaseone	
665	20	May 29	Zerobaseone; Dxmon	The Zerobaseone segment continued from last week's episode
666	21	June 5	Kep1er	
667	22	June 12	Nexz	
668	23	June 19	Evnne	
669	24	June 26	TWS	
670	25	July 3	H1-Key	
671	26	July 10	Everglow	
672	27	July 17	Kiss of Life	Special MC: Ha Sung-woon
673	28	July 24	N.SSign	Special MC: Ha Sung-woon; N.SSign members Eddie, Hyun and Doha are absent due to health issues
674	29	July 31	Vivi (Loossemble), Blackswan (Fatou, Gabi), Hanbin (Tempest), Xinyu (TripleS), Xodiac (Zayyan, Sing), Na Kamden (Ampers&One)	
675	30	August 7	Unis	
676	31	August 14	Hyolyn	Special MC: Ha Sung-woon; Lee Jang-jun is absent
677	32	August 21	Jo Hye-ryun	Special MC: Ha Sung-woon; Lee Jang-jun is absent
678	33	August 28	Bebe	
679	34	September 4	Younha	
680	35	September 11	BoyNextDoor	
681	36	September 18	P1Harmony	
682	37	September 25	Madein	
683	38	October 2	Katseye	Special MC: Na Kamden (Ampers&One); Katseye member Megan left the show early due to injury
684	39	October 9	Fifty Fifty	
685	40	October 16	Xdinary Heroes	
686	41	October 23	TripleS Visionary Vision	
687	42	October 30	Illit	
688	43	November 6	Kep1er	
689	44	November 13	Purple Kiss, Epex	
690	45	November 20	Class:y	
691	46	November 27	TWS	
692	47	December 4	Nexz	
693	48	December 11	Badvillain, Kany Diabaté Ahn	Boom and Lee Jang-jun's last episode as hosts
694	49	December 18	No Guests	Rookie Girl Groups Highlight Special; This episode consisted of highlights from previous appearances of Illit, Unis and Katseye on the show
695	50	December 25	No Guests	Rookie Boy Groups Highlight Special; This episode consisted of highlights from previous appearances of TWS, NCT Wish and Nexz on the show

== 2025 ==
List of episodes (2025)

No. in overall	No. in season	Air Date	Featured guests	Notes
The show went on a six-month hiatus before confirming its return in June 2025.
Season 6 - Hosts: Minhyuk (Monsta X), Hyeongjun (Cravity)
696	1	June 6	Meovv	First episode with Minhyuk (Monsta X) and Hyeongjun (Cravity) as hosts
697	2	June 13	Izna	Izna member Yoon Ji-yoon is absent due to hiatus from health issues
698	3	June 20	KickFlip	
699	4	June 27	Cravity	
700	5	July 4	P1Harmony	
701	6	July 11	Close Your Eyes	
702	7	July 18	AHOF	
703	8	July 25	Baby Don't Cry	
704	9	August 1	STAYC	
705	10	August 8	KiiiKiii	
The broadcast scheduled for August 15 was cancelled in commemoration of the National Liberation Day of Korea
706	11	August 22	Idid	
707	12	August 29	Teen Top	Minhyuk and Hyeongjun's last episode as hosts
