= Sunghwa Kim =

South Korean dancer

Sunghwa Kim is a South Korean contemporary dancer and choreographer. He has worked as an instructor at Daejeon University and Sang Myung University in South Korea, and as a personal choreographer for the South Korean Olympic Figure Skating Team at the 2018 Winter Olympics in PyeongChang County, South Korea.

== Education ==
Kim is a graduate of Hanyang University in Seoul.

== Career ==
Kim has worked as a choreographer for numerous different dance companies in South Korea, including Universal Ballet. Kim has also worked as a personal dance trainer for South Korean actress Kim Ji-ho. He has also held dance instruction positions at Daejeon University and Sang Myung University.

From 2011 to 2016, Kim worked as a personal choreographer for athletes participating in the South Korean Figure Skating Championships. In 2018, he worked as a personal coach for members of South Korean Olympic Figure Skating Team at the 2018 Winter Olympics.

In 2008, Kim successfully auditioned for the cast of Cirque du Soleil at an audition in Vienna, Austria.

== N.E.X.T Communication ==
In 2008, Kim founded N.E.X.T Communication, a physical theatre inspired dance company, in South Korea. In 2014, Kim re-named the company as N.E.X.T (NewEXperimentTechnique) Communication, with the new intention of specifically working with children from underprivileged backgrounds. The Company's next production, entitled "Rainbow Team", is currently in process.

== Awards ==
- Best Performer, 2011, 15th MASDANZA International Choreography Competition, Gran Canaria, Spain
- Best Merchant Award, 2002, 39th National New Dance Contest, the South Korea Dance Association
