= Hotel King =

South Korean television series

- Promotional poster
- Genre: Melodrama; Revenge; Romance
- Written by: Jo Eun-jung
- Directed by: Kim Dae-jin; Jang Joon-ho
- Starring: Lee Dong-wook; Lee Da-hae; Wang Ji-hye; Lim Seul-ong
- Music by: Lee Ji-yong
- Country of origin: South Korea
- Original language: Korean
- No. of episodes: 32

Production
- Executive producer: Kim Jin-min
- Producer: Yoo Hyun-jong
- Running time: 60 minutes

Original release
- Network: MBC TV
- Release: April 5 – July 27, 2014

Hotel King (Korean: 호텔킹) is a 2014 South Korean television series starring Lee Dong-wook, Lee Da-hae, Wang Ji-hye, and Lim Seul-ong. It aired on MBC from April 5 to July 27, 2014, on Saturdays and Sundays at 21:45 for 32 episodes.

Lee Dong-wook and Lee Da-hae previously starred together in My Girl (2005).

== Synopsis ==
A love story between an heiress who tries to save her father's legacy, the one and only seven-star hotel in the nation, and a hotel manager who becomes his mentor's enemy in order to protect her.

== Cast ==
=== Main characters ===
- Lee Dong-wook as Cha Jae-wan/Jayden/Baek Hyun-woo/Lee Hyun-woo

The cool-headed, polished general manager of Hotel Ciel. Jae-wan hides a painful past; his unknown father had abandoned him and his mother to a life of poverty. Yet Jae-wan rises from his miserable beginnings to become the youngest ever general manager with such steely competence that he earns himself the nickname of "hotel monster." A succession battle ignites when Jae-wan is told that his biological father was Chairman Ah, the recently deceased owner of Hotel Ciel.

- Lee Da-hae as Ah Mo-ne/Bok-Soon

Mo-ne is an heiress, the only daughter of the chairman of Hotel Ciel, the only seven-star hotel in Korea. Upon her father's death, she becomes the hotel's primary successor. But Mo-ne is utterly unqualified to take over the business, having lived a pampered, sheltered life, coupled with her flighty, unpredictable personality which makes her cheerfully barge into the executive ranks with nary a care for propriety or tact. But once the hotel faces a crisis, she must rise to the occasion and struggle to protect it.

- Wang Ji-hye as Song Chae-kyung

The owner of Hotel Ciel's Hamill restaurant, and Jae-wan's ex-girlfriend. She is the widow of the former chairman of the wealthy GR Group. Regretting her choice of marrying another man for money, Chae-kyung tries to win back Jae-wan's love.

- Lim Seul-ong as Sunwoo Hyun

An optimistic, loud and hard working hotel concierge, Hyun is often at odds with Jae-wan. Hyun is assigned to help out Mo-ne when she first comes to Hotel Ciel, teaching her the ropes and bailing her out of scrapes. As he grows to care for her, he becomes even more determined to help Mo-ne save the hotel. It is later revealed that he is the son of the owner of a farm.

- Lee Deok-hwa as Lee Joong-goo

Vice chairman of Hotel Ciel. He tells Jae-wan that he is the biological son of Chairman Ah, owner of Hotel Ciel, and takes the young man under his wing, promising to turn Jae-wan into the best in the business and make him king. It is later revealed that he is, in fact, Jae-wan's biological father.

- Kim Hae-sook as Baek Mi-nyeo

Training manager of Hotel Ciel. It is later revealed that her real name is Baek Mi-yeon, and that she was Ah Sung-won's former lover and Cha Jae-wan's biological mother. She schemes to destroy Hotel Ciel in order to avenge the death of her real son (Hyun-woo/Jae-wan).

- Jin Tae-hyun as Roman Lee/Lee Ju-han

A prospective investor of Hotel Ciel, who is later revealed to be Baek Mi-nyeo's son and a blood brother to Cha Jae-wan. He shares the same past as Cha Jae-wan and is a brother figure to him.

=== Supporting characters ===
- Gong Hyun-joo as Cha Soo-an

The highly educated hotel VIP supervisor, who looks up highly upon Cha Jae-wan. One of the four specialists brought in by General Manager Cha Jae-wan from his former workplace in Las Vegas to assist him in the hotel. Later, she helps Jae-wan and Mo-ne to retrieve the hotel again.

- Alex Chu as Yoo Joon-sung

The Food & Kitchen Team Leader, who is friendly and flirtatious. One of the four specialists brought in by General Manager Cha Jae-wan from his former workplace in Las Vegas to assist him in the hotel. It is revealed later that Joon-sung has been secretly helping to Manager Baek Mi-nyeo, much to the dismay of his friends.

- Kim Sun-hyuk as Hong Joon

The Guest Room Team Leader, who has a bad temper. One of the four specialists brought in by General Manager Cha Jae-wan from his former workplace in Las Vegas to assist him in the hotel.

- Go Yoon as Park Do-jin

The Concierge Team Leader, who often uses English to taunt the locally educated employees. One of the four specialists brought in by General Manager Cha Jae-wan from his former workplace in Las Vegas to assist him in the hotel.

- Park Chul-min as Jang Ho-il

The Guest Room Manager who is narcissistic and often spreads rumours. He was under the assumption that So Moon-jung had a crush on him.

- Jung Suk-yong as Go San

Fondly known as "Captain Go", he is a concierge at Hotel Ciel. In a relationship with So Moon-jung.

- Ji Il-joo as Jin Jung-hyun

A front-desk concierge at Hotel Ciel along with Yoon Da-jung, with whom he develops a romantic interest in.

- Kim Ye-won as Yoon Da-jung

A front-desk concierge at Hotel Ciel who dreams of marrying a rich suitor.

- Yoo Se-hyung as Eun Joon-jae
- Kim Sung-young as So Moon-jung

A maid at Hotel Ciel who constantly creates rumours and gossips about people in the hotel. In a relationship with Go San.

- Kim Kyu-sun as Ha So-yeon

A maid at Hotel Ciel.

- Goo Bon-im as Madam Kim

A maid at Hotel Ciel.

- Cha Hak-yeon as Noah

A bright and lively hotel employee.

- Lee Do-yeon as Lee Ip-sae
- Lee Sang-mi as Yoon Ji-won

Lee Joong-goo's wife and Lee Da-bae's mother. She is a well-known philanthropist and poetry writer.

- Seo Yi-an as Lee Da-bae

Lee Joong-goo's daughter and Cha Jae-wan's half sister. She is a jovial girl, who enjoys helping society.

- Choi Sang-hoon as Ah Sung-won

The deceased Chairman of Hotel Ciel and Ah Mo-ne's father.

- Yoo Gun as John Howard
- Cho Yoon-woo as Yoo Joo-min (cameo, ep 17)
- Lee Joo-yeon as Chae-won (cameo, ep 31–32)

A proud and bossy top celebrity.

- Kim Ha-rin as Baek Mi-yeon

== Production ==
The first script reading took place in February 2014.

== Original soundtrack ==
Hotel King Original Sound Track

Soundtrack album by Various Artists
- Released: July 25, 2014
- Genre: Pop, K-pop, soundtrack, R&B
- Label: Star Entry/Inter Park/Windmill ENT; INT-0001
- Producer: Kim Young-ho

The official soundtrack album for Hotel King was released on July 25, 2014. It was the debut foray of the famous Korean online auction and shopping mall Inter Park to the music industry business.

No.	Title	Artist	Length
1.	"Hotelier"	Various Artists
2.	"아파" (It Hurts)	Kim Jin-ho
3.	"기다려본다" (Waiting)	Melody Day
4.	"사랑한단 말" (Telling You That I Love You)	Lee Changmin and Jeong Jinwoon (of 2AM)
5.	"그대라서" (Because It's You)	The One
6.	"같은자리" (Same Place)	Vanilla Acoustic (바닐라 어쿠스틱)
7.	"사랑병" (Lovesick)	Lumin & T.O. (of M.Pire)
8.	"아파 (Acoustic Ver.)" (It Hurts (Acoustic Ver.))	Kim Jin-ho
9.	"같은자리 (Acoustic Ver.)" (Same Place (Acoustic Ver.))	Vanilla Acoustic (바닐라 어쿠스틱)
10.	"사랑병 (Drama Ver.)" (Lovesick (Drama Ver.))	Lumin & T.O. (of M.Pire)
11.	"보이지 않는 운명"	Various Artists
12.	"Secret"	Various Artists
13.	"그림자" (Shadow)	Various Artists
14.	"It's Just Me"	Various Artists
15.	"Run"	Various Artists
16.	"Kiss of Promise"	Various Artists
17.	"나를 닮은 너"	Various Artists
18.	"눈물은 말한다"	Various Artists
19.	"시간의 운명"	Various Artists

== Ratings ==
In the tables below, the blue numbers represent the lowest ratings and the red numbers represent the highest ratings.

Episode #	Original broadcast date	Average audience share			
Episode #	Original broadcast date	TNmS Ratings		AGB Nielsen	
Episode #	Original broadcast date	Nationwide	Seoul National Capital Area	Nationwide	Seoul National Capital Area
01	April 5, 2014	11.8%	14.3%	11.7%	13.1%
02	April 6, 2014	11.2%	14.3%	10.9%	12%
03	April 12, 2014	11.1%	14.9%	10.9%	12.3%
04	April 13, 2014	11.6%	13.9%	11.6%	12.8%
05	April 26, 2014	7.4%	8.6%	8.2%	9.6%
06	April 27, 2014	8.8%	10.4%	10.3%	11.8%
07	May 3, 2014	8.7%	10.6%	9.1%	9.6%
08	May 4, 2014	9.1%	10.9%	9.0%	9.7%
09	May 10, 2014	8.6%	10.6%	8.6%	9.5%
10	May 11, 2014	9.5%	10.9%	10.5%	11.6%
11	May 17, 2014	8.4%	10.6%	9.6%	10.2%
12	May 18, 2014	9.0%	11.8%	9.3%	9.7%
13	May 24, 2014	8.6%	11.2%	8.7%	10.1%
14	May 25, 2014	7.8%	9.7%	8.3%	8.7%
15	May 31, 2014	9.8%	12.2%	10.0%	10.2%
16	June 1, 2014	9.6%	11.8%	9.7%	10.2%
17	June 7, 2014	9.6%	12.5%	10.4%	11.9%
18	June 8, 2014	8.3%	10.9%	8.8%	9.4%
19	June 14, 2014	9.9%	12.4%	9.8%	10.5%
20	June 15, 2014	9.3%	11.4%	9.8%	10.2%
21	June 21, 2014	9.9%	12.7%	10.9%	12.2%
22	June 22, 2014	9.8%	12.4%	10.7%	12.3%
23	June 28, 2014	10.6%	13.3%	9.8%	10.3%
24	June 29, 2014	10.2%	12.5%	9.9%	10.2%
25	July 5, 2014	10.3%	13.4%	11.3%	11.6%
26	July 6, 2014	10.0%	12.4%	11.0%	11.3%
27	July 12, 2014	11.1%	14.4%	10.6%	11.5%
28	July 13, 2014	11.6%	14.3%	13.6%	15.4%
29	July 19, 2014	11.7%	14.8%	12.3%	13.3%
30	July 20, 2014	11.4%	13.8%	12.4%	13.9%
31	July 26, 2014	11.6%	14.6%	11.8%	13.3%
32	July 27, 2014	12.1%	14.6%	11.8%	13.0%
Average		10.0%	12.4%	10.3%	11.2%

== Awards and nominations ==
Year	Award	Category	Recipient	Result
2014	3rd APAN Star Awards	Top Excellence Award, Actor in a Serial Drama	Lee Dong-wook	Nominated
2014	MBC Drama Awards	Top Excellence Award, Actor in a Special Project Drama	Lee Dong-wook	Nominated
2014	MBC Drama Awards	Excellence Award, Actress in a Special Project Drama	Lee Da-hae	Nominated
2014	MBC Drama Awards	Golden Acting Award, Actor	Lee Deok-hwa	Nominated

== International broadcast ==
The series became very popular in China and has recorded the second highest TV ratings among Korean dramas on Baidu during its run. It has also been the number one Korean drama on iQiyi, a Chinese video website, reaching more than 200 million views, and the 5th most popular drama in China during its run.

It aired in Japan on cable channel KNTV from May 5 to September 15, 2014.

It aired in Thailand on Workpoint TV beginning July 23, 2014.

It aired in Vietnam on VTV and on HTV2 cable channel with a local title of Vua khách sạn from April 2, 2015.

It aired in Taiwan on GTV starting May 6, 2015.

It aired on Oh!K, a subscription pay cable and satellite television channel currently available in Singapore, Indonesia, Malaysia, and Brunei.

It is airing on NTDTV KXLA 44.7 starting on March 25, 2016, 11:00 pm (localtime)
