= Tomorrow Boy =

- Promotional poster
- Written by: Park Seon-jae
- Directed by: Jang Eui-soon
- Starring: N Kang Min-ah; Yoo Se-hyung; Moon Ji-in
- Country of origin: South Korea
- Original language: Korean
- No. of episodes: 5

Production
- Running time: 18 minutes
- Production companies: National Credit Union Federation of Korea; WOWTV ensource/With&Joy Entertainment

Original release
- Network: Naver TV Cast
- Release: March 28 – April 11, 2016

Tomorrow Boy (Korean: 투모로우 보이) is a 5-episode South Korean web drama starring N, Kang Min-ah, Yoo Se-hyung and Moon Ji-in. Produced by the National Credit Union Federation of Korea (NACUFOK, or in local parlance, Sinhyeob (Korean: 신협)), it was aired on Naver TV Cast from March 28 to April 11, 2016 with five episodes.

== Synopsis ==
Ahn Tae-pyung (N) is the eldest among four orphaned siblings living with their grandmother (Moon Hyung-joo). He is a high school student but takes up part-time jobs and also sells ddeokbokki in order to clear his dead father's debts and to take care of his younger siblings and grandmother. During a robbery at a burger shop, he saves Ah-ra (Kang Min-ah) from being taken hostage. Since then Ah-ra, a rich girl from another school, has taken a liking for Tae-pyung. She would follow him whenever possible, would try to get his attention, and also try to impress him. The drama ends with Ah-ra trying to find out who is the guy whom Shin-young (Moon Ji-in), the credit union boss of Tae-pyung, is interested during Tae-pyung's birthday celebration at his house.

== Cast ==
=== Main cast ===
- N as Ahn Tae-pyung
- Kang Min-ah as Jo Ah-ra
- Yoo Se-hyung as Kim Nam-soo
- Moon Ji-in as Seo Shin-young

=== Others ===
- Yoon Hye-suk as Moneylender
- Baek Bong-ki as Myung-soo
- Jeon In-taek as Workshop boss
- Kim Jin-geun as Cafe boss
- Moon Hyung-joo as Grandmother

== Original soundtracks ==
Track listing
No.	Title	Artist	Length
1.	"Do It"	Yang.D ft. Heo Young Joo	3:25
2.	"Do It" (Inst.)	Yang.D ft. Heo Young Joo	3:25
3.	"Day By Day"	Yang.D ft. Heo Young Joo	3:37
4.	"Day By Day" (Inst.)	Yang.D ft. Heo Young Joo	3:37
5.	"Oh My Shine"	Heo Young Joo	3:00
6.	"Oh My Shine" (Inst.)	Heo Young Joo	3:00
