= The Family is Coming =

2015 South Korean television series

- Promotional poster
- Also known as: Here Comes Family! Family Outing
- Hangul: 떴다! 패밀리
- RR: Tteotda! paemilli
- MR: Ttŏtta! p'aemilli
- Genre: Family; Romance; Comedy; Drama
- Based on: Grandma's Back by Kim Bum
- Written by: Kim Shin-hye
- Directed by: Joo Dong-min
- Starring: Lee Jung-hyun; Jin Yi-han; Oh Sang-jin; Park Won-sook
- Country of origin: South Korea
- Original language: Korean
- No. of episodes: 20

Production
- Executive producer: Hong Sung-chang
- Producers: Sung Min Seok; Kim Min Tae
- Production location: Korea
- Running time: 60 minutes Saturdays and Sundays at 20:45 (KST)
- Production company: A Story

Original release
- Network: SBS
- Release: January 3 – March 15, 2015

The Family is Coming (Korean: 떴다! 패밀리) is a 2015 South Korean television series based on Kim Bum's 2012 novel Grandma's Back (할매가 돌아왔다; Halmaega dorawatda). Starring Lee Jung-hyun, Jin Yi-han, Oh Sang-jin and Park Won-sook, it aired on SBS from January 3 to March 15, 2015 on Saturdays and Sundays at 20:45 for 20 episodes.

== Plot ==
After 50 years living in Hollywood, Jung Kkeut-soon returns to Korea to reconnect with her family. As family members scramble to compete over her ₩20 billion inheritance, they learn emotional growth and reconciliation.

== Cast ==
=== Main characters ===
- Lee Jung-hyun as Na Joon-hee/Susan Johnson
- Jin Yi-han as Choi Dong-seok
- Oh Sang-jin as Jung Joon-ah/James
- Park Won-sook as Jung Kkeut-soon/Audrey Jung

=== Supporting characters ===
- Jung Han-heon as Choi Jong-tae
- Park Jun-gyu as Choi Dal-soo
- Lee Hwi-hyang as Kim Jung-sook
- Baek Ji-won as Choi Dal-ja
- Ahn Hye-kyung as Choi Dong-eun
- Choi Jung-hoon as Kim Sang-woo / Han Sang-woo
- Hwang Chae-won as Park Chae-won
- Park So-jin as Choi Dong-joo
- Yoo Se-hyung as Yong Hong-gab
- Lee Si-hoo as Choi Jong-tae
- Cha Hak-yeon as Cha Hak-yeon
- Choi Jung-won as Han Sang-woo
- Han Min-chae as Lee Hyun-ae

== Ratings ==
In the table below, the blue numbers represent the lowest ratings and the red numbers represent the highest ratings.

Episode #	Original broadcast date	Average audience share			
Episode #	Original broadcast date	TNmS Ratings		AGB Nielsen	
Episode #	Original broadcast date	Nationwide	Seoul National Capital Area	Nationwide	Seoul National Capital Area
1	3 January 2015	4.0%	4.7%	4.3%	5.3%
2	4 January 2015	4.2%	4.9%	4.7%	5.7%
3	10 January 2015	3.6%	3.9%	4.1%	4.6%
4	11 January 2015	3.9%	5.0%	4.7%	5.1%
5	17 January 2015	3.5%	-	3.4%	-
6	18 January 2015	3.0%	-	3.1%	-
7	24 January 2015	2.7%	-	3.2%	-
8	25 January 2015	2.9%	-	2.9%	-
9	31 January 2015	3.0%	-	3.3%	-
10	1 February 2015	2.3%	-	3.1%	-
11	7 February 2015	2.6%	-	3.2%	-
12	8 February 2015	2.2%	-	2.3%	-
13	14 February 2015	2.1%	-	2.7%	-
14	15 February 2015	1.9%	-	2.6%	-
15	28 February 2015	2.5%	-	2.8%	-
16	1 March 2015	2.8%	-	3.1%	-
17	7 March 2015	2.8%	-	2.9%	-
18	8 March 2015	2.6%	-	2.9%	-
19	14 March 2015	2.3%	-	2.5%	-
20	15 March 2015	2.4%	-	2.3%	-
Average		2.9%	%	3.2%	%

== International broadcast ==
Country	Network	Airing dates
Japan		2015
Thailand	PPTV	August 14, 2016 - , 2016
Myanmar		2016
Vietnam	VTV3	January 2, 2017-, 2017
Philippines	UNTV Public Service	This 2020
