= Yoo Se-hyung =

South Korean actor

- Born: Yoo Se-hyung; 12 May 1992 (age 34); South Korea
- Other names: Yoo Se Hyeong, Yu Sehyeong, Yoo Yeo Woon
- Education: Hanyang University
- Occupations: Actor; model; singer
- Years active: 2012–present
- Agent: Jellyfish Entertainment

Yoo Se-hyung (born May 12, 1992) is a South Korean actor. He is best known for his main role in Tomorrow Boy and Reply Pyeongchang, 100 °F. He is also known for appearing in the famous film Another Promise.

== Filmography ==
=== Television ===
Year	Title	Role	Ref.
2012	My Kids Give Me a Headache	Min-gyu	
2013	KBS Drama Special: "Land of Rain"	Dan-woo	
2014	KBS Drama Special: "Darkness"	Lee Chan-young	
2014	Hotel King	Eun Yoon-jae	
2014	Drawing, Spring	Yun Chang-ki	
2015	The Family is Coming	Yong Hong-gab	
2015	The Jingbirok: A Memoir of Imjin War	God of wind	
2015	Unkind Ladies	Yoo Se-hyeong	
2015	Who Are You: School 2015	Swimmer of school team	
2015	The Man in the Mask	Moon Tae-seong	
2015	Hello Monster	Lee Jin-woo	
2015	D-Day	Yoo Se	
2016	Reply Pyeongchang, 100°F	Hwang In-jun	
2016	Tomorrow Boy	Kim Nam-soo	
2020	How Are U Bread	MC Park	
2020	The Game: Towards Zero	Sung Min-jae	
2020	How to Buy a Friend	Ahn Sung-do	
2024	Begins ≠ Youth	Choi Ji-han	

=== Film ===
Year	Title	Role	Ref.
2014	Another Promise	Han Yoon Suk	
