= Happy Together (2018 film) =

- Theatrical release poster
- Hangul: 해피 투게더
- RR: Haepi tugedeo
- MR: Haep'i t'ugedŏ
- Directed by: Kim Jung-hwan
- Written by: Lee Chang-yeol
- Produced by: Jeon Joo-hyun
- Starring: Park Sung-woong; Song Sae-byeok; Choi Ro-woon; Han Sang-hyuk
- Music by: Jin Soo Kim
- Production company: Golden Story Pictures
- Distributed by: Semicolon Studios
- Release date: November 15, 2018
- Running time: 111 minutes
- Country: South Korea
- Language: Korean
- Box office: US$176,044

Happy Together is a 2018 South Korean drama film directed by Kim Jung-hwan. It was released on November 15, 2018.

== Premise ==
The story revolves around Suk-jin and his son, Ha-neul, who earn a living by playing music together on night stages, as they struggle to achieve a successful life.

== Cast ==
- Park Sung-woong as Kang Suk-jin
- Song Sae-byeok as Park Young-geol
- Choi Ro-woon as Ha-neul (younger)
- Han Sang-hyuk as Ha-neul
- Kwon Hae-hyo as Dal-su
- Jung In-gi as Captain Choi
- Song Duk-ho as Peter / Pedro
- Lee Jae-yong as Chairman Kim
- Sung Byung-sook as Nun Veronica
- Cho Seung-hee as Nun Maria

== Production ==
Principal photography began on October 14, 2017.

== Release ==
The film was released on November 15, 2018, alongside Unfinished and Hollywood film Fantastic Beasts: The Crimes of Grindelwald, which was released a day earlier.
