= Kim Kiri =

South Korean comedian (born 1985)

Kim Ki-ri
- Born: November 27, 1985 (age 40); Seosan, South Korea
- Spouse: Moon Ji-in (m. 2024)
- Children: 1

Comedy career
- Years active: 2006–present
- Medium: Television
- Genres: Observational, sketch, parody

Korean name
- Hangul: 김기리
- Hanja: 金基利
- RR: Gim Giri
- MR: Kim Kiri

Kim Ki-ri (Korean: 김기리, born November 27, 1985), sometimes romanized as Kim Kilee or Kim Giri, is a South Korean comedian best known from his appearances on the comedy sketch show Gag Concert aired by KBS2.

== Personal life ==
On January 29, 2024, Kim's agency confirmed Kim would marry actress Moon Ji-in the next May. The couple married on May 17, 2024, in Seoul. The couple welcomed a son on August 7, 2026.

== Filmography ==
=== Television show ===
Year	Title	Role	Notes	Ref.
2006	Gag 1	Cast member		
2009	Gag Star	Cast member		
2010	Gag Concert	Cast member		
2014	The Human Condition	Cast member	Episode 68–92	
2015	Game of Thrones: The Return of Superman vs Two Days and One Night	Participant		
2016	King of Mask Singer	Contestant	As "I'm Fine Thank You" (episode 59)	
2016	Tribe of Hip Hop	Contestant		

=== Drama ===
Year	Title	Role	Notes	Ref.
2013	The Queen of Office		Cameo appearance	
2013	You Are the Best!		Cameo appearance	
2015	You Will Love Me		Cameo appearance	
2016	Entertainer		Cameo appearance	
2017	Strong Family	Deputy Park		
2017	Bravo My Life	Chul-seon		
2018	Welcome to Waikiki	MC Dacopy	Cameo (episode 19)	
2018	Dae Jang Geum Is Watching	Won Bin		
2019	Liver or Die	Kye Sang-ki		
2019	The Light in Your Eyes	Park Kwang-soo	Special appearance	
2019	Home for Summer	Oh Dae-seong		
2020	Please Don't Date Him	Jegal Su-won		
2021	Hello, Me!	Kim Yong-hwa		

=== Voice artist ===
Year	Title	Role	Notes	Ref.
2008	Dragon Hunters	Gwizdo	Voice; Korean language dub	

=== Gag Concert segments ===
- Reali-T (2011)
- Discoveries of Life (2011–2013)
- Uncomfortable Truth (2011–2013)
- Superstar KBS
- Bongsunga School
- 모던보이
- EBS Drama
- 노력의 결정체
- We Are One (2012)
- 팀을 위한 길
- Differently (2013)
- The Boy Band (JeonGukGu) (2012–2013)
- The Three Friends (2013–2014)
- The King of Ratings (2013)
- A Fairy Tales for Adult (2014)
- Strongest Mentality (2014)
- 힙합의신/God of Hip Hop(2014)
- Stubborn (2015)
- Yes or No (2015)
- Reaction Baseball League (2015)

== Discography ==
=== Jeon Guk Gu ===
Year	Title	Notes
2013	Fashion City	Single album

== Awards and nominations ==
Year	Award	Category	Result
2012	KBS Entertainment Awards	Best Newcomer Award	Won
