= Continuum (EP) =

EP by VIXX
- Released: November 21, 2023
- Genre: K-pop
- Length: 15:24
- Language: Korean
- Label: Jellyfish Entertainment; CJ E&M Music

VIXX chronology
Reincarnation (2018)	Continuum (2023)

Continuum is the fifth mini-album by South Korean boy band VIXX. It was released on November 21, 2023, under the label of Jellyfish Entertainment. The mini-album, which features the themes of continuity and growth, was accompanied by the release of a music video for its title track "Amnesia".

== Track listing ==
The credits are adapted from Jellyfish Entertainment's official website.

Amnesia - EP
No.	Title	Lyrics	Music	Length
1.	"Amnesia"	Park Seong-hee (JamFactory)	Strong Dragon, PUFF, samUIL	2:59
2.	"Chemical"	Leo, Kang Eun-jeong	HotSauce, Lee Woo-min "collapsedone", Justin Reinstein	3:07
3.	"Lilac"	Hyuk, Juseog, Doyeon (wavecloud), Lee Gyeong (wavecloud)	Hyuk, Vendors (Owl), Vendors (Abim), Vendors (Fascinador), Vendors (Louis)	3:10
4.	"SAVAGE"	Na Yun-jeong (lalala studio)	arcon, Heechang (Coke paris), Jimmy Claeson	2:52
5.	"If You Come Tonight"	Leo, Ryan IM	EJO IM, Uknow, Ryan IM, KATCHY	3:16
Total length:				15:24

== Chart performance ==
Chart	Peak position	Sales
Circle Weekly albums chart	8	KOR: 84,417
Circle Monthly albums chart	27	KOR: 84,417
