= Weekly Idol =

South Korean television series

- Promotional poster
- Hangul: 주간 아이돌
- RR: Jugan aidol
- MR: Chugan aidol
- Genre: Variety
- Created by: Jang Jae-hyuk
- Opening theme: Macho Man by Village People (July 23, 2011 – December 4, 2013)
- Country of origin: South Korea
- Original language: Korean
- No. of episodes: 707 (list of episodes)

Production
- Executive producer: Lee Soon-ok
- Camera setup: Multi-camera setup
- Running time: 60 minutes
- Production companies: Genie Pictures (Season 1); HiCC Media (Season 2); PERSONS (Season 3)

Original release
- Network: MBC Every1
- Release: July 23, 2011 – August 29, 2025

Weekly Idol (Korean: 주간 아이돌; RR: Jugan aidol) is a South Korean variety show that began in 2011 and aired on Wednesdays at 6:20 PM KST on MBC M, and 12:00 AM KST on MBC Every1. It is one of the longest-running variety shows to air on satellite TV in Japan.

The show was hosted during its first season by comedian Jeong Hyeong-don and rapper Defconn.

The production company behind the show, Genie Pictures was acquired by FNC Add Culture on January 15, 2018, while FNC Add Culture was acquired by SM Entertainment on May 18, 2018 and renamed SM Life Design Group.

On February 22, 2018, MBC Every1 announced that both hosts would be stepping down from the show.

Former Roo'ra member Lee Sang-min and comedians Yoo Se-yoon & Kim Shin-young were selected as the new hosts of the show's second season, which debuted on April 11, 2018. On November 21, 2018, it was announced that all 3 hosts, current producers and crew will be departing the show in January 2019, and a restructuring of the program is expected.

On December 18, 2018, it was announced that the new hosts for the third season of the show are comedians Nam Chang-hee & Jo Se-ho and ZE:A's Hwang Kwang-hee. The third season began on January 9, 2019. On February 12, 2020, it was announced that Jo Se-ho and Nam Chang-hee will leave their hosting roles, and there will be special MCs recruited to join Hwang Kwang-hee in hosting of each episode, starting from the episode on February 19 until the episode on April 15. On April 17, it was announced that Super Junior's Eunhyuk will join the fixed MC cast alongside Hwang Kwang-hee, starting from the episode on April 22.

On April 4, 2023 it was announced that Hwang Kwang-hee and Eunhyuk will leave their hosting roles after the episode on April 12, and BtoB's Seo Eun-kwang and Lovelyz's Mijoo will replace the former two beginning from April 19. Mukbang YouTuber Heebab would join the fixed cast lineup beginning the episode on November 1.

On December 26, 2023, it was announced that Lee Mi-joo and Seo Eun-kwang will leave their roles as MCs with their last episode airing the next day. The two would be replaced by Boom and Golden Child's Lee Jang-jun, beginning the episode on January 17, 2024.

The show went on a six-month hiatus after the episode on December 25, 2024, before confirming its return on June 6, 2025 as the sixth season, with Monsta X's Minhyuk and Cravity's Hyeongjun named the new MCs. It would be aired on a new timeslot of Fridays at 5:30 PM KST on MBC M, and 11:30 PM KST on MBC Every1. The season ended after just three months, and the show has been on hiatus since then.

== Segments and corners ==
=== Current ===
- Guests' wishlist: With each new guests' first appearance, they would send in their hopes for trying classic segments of Weekly Idol (like Random Play Dance, This Corner's Star Is Me, etc.) or make a new segments just for them for future reference.
- Fan's wishlist: Fan would send in hand-written notes a week before broadcast, then each member would answer their questions or fulfill their requests.
- Weekly Playlist: Guests can perform a series of dance or song covers.
- Weekly Flaylist: An altered segment just for a member of Fromis 9 to sing a cover of an English song regardless of the age of the song. This is one of the only times where the background of the set change to purple to reflect the group's representative color.

=== Pre-segment ===
Before "Idol of the Week", Weekly Idol had only one segment, "Real Chart! Idol Self-Ranking", where idols were asked to rank each other on different topics. This was later replaced by "I Wonder If You Know", where hosts, featured idols, Ilhoon (BtoB), and Bomi (Apink) guess one answer out of two choices given to them about idols, with food as a prize. This segment was replaced by "Weekly Food Tasting", where hosts, featured idols, Hayoung (Apink), Mina (AOA), and N (VIXX) complete mission to win foods they want. The following segment was "Idols are the Best", where various missions were given to the featured idols, namely Jackson (Got7), Joohoney (Monsta X), SinB (GFriend) and Dahyun (Twice).

A new segment was introduced on February 22, 2017, "Masked Idol: Your Name Is", where masked idols compete against one another: the winner gets to remove his/her mask and promote himself/herself and/or his/her group, while the rest have to attend the following week's contest alongside one new masked idol.

=== Main segment: Idol of The Week ===
The main segment of the show, called "Idol of the Week" (Korean: 금주의 아이돌), features idol groups as the invited guests, and usually consists of several featured corners which vary from episode to episode:

- Random Play Dance: the staff plays any songs that had been promoted by the guests randomly. A song usually stops at a random point or changes to another song while the guests must dance with the proper choreography for each song. It can also be shuffled from the same song or songs from the opposite gender (boy groups dancing to girl group songs and vice versa).
- Profile Verification/Rewritten Profile: the guests comment their profile cards with the hosts, verifying or voluntarily proving the info before them.
- Win Against Idol: the guests play a game together with the hosts. If the guests can beat the hosts, the winning side will get the special prize and the losing side will get the physical punishment from the winners.
- Grill Idol: the guests must correctly answer some questions from the hosts; if they get the question right, they can eat the grilled pieces of Hanwoo beef that are prepared by the staff.
- DoniConi Idol Call Center: a special call center is prepared for one week before the recording of an episode, and the fans can personally call in and leave messages for the guests; some messages are then revealed to the idols during the recording. Some fans ask the guests to perform a request.
- Absent Member Call Center: a special call center where a member that is absent for any reason is called live, and they would be prompted to mention other members' names. The member mentioned the fewest times can get a prize. The first group trialled was EXID, Solji was the one receiving the call as she was still not medically cleared to return due to hyperthyroidism.
- 99 Seconds Challenge: the guests need to succeed in a certain mission during a ninety-nine-second relay.
- X2 Speed Dance Challenge: the guests must dance to one of their songs at double speed. It was first trialled on GFriend and is now one of the most popular segments.
- This Corner's Star Is Me: the guests themselves decide the punishment in categories of when, where and what to do, and then play games to settle the final decision on each of the categories. The losing team (which is decided on the final battle) will carry out the punishment based on the categories.
- X2 Speed Random Play Dance: a special segment trialled on GFriend, where they have to dance to a random selection of their own songs at double speed. They only have one chance to win expensive prizes.
- Magic Choreography: the guests will be asked to fit choreography from one song to the music of another song. For example, when EXID danced their "Hot Pink" to "Mr. Mr." by Girls' Generation, or when they danced their "Up and Down" to "Mansae" by Seventeen, or when Red Velvet danced their "Russian Roulette" while lip-syncing to "Bubble Pop" by HyunA.
- I AM a native speaker: A segment specifically for EXID due to the members' English abilities which vary greatly. Each member must give English clues for a word to German entertainer Dario without acting it out, and Dario can answer in either Korean or English. The member that gets Dario to answer the most questions gets a prize.
- Back to Debut: A new segment in 2019, where a group dances to their debut song in original hair and makeup stylings, but with minor costume adjustments.
- Do You Know This: A segment for younger idols born in the '90s or beyond, where they play a series of old playground games of the '70s to '90s. The winners of the best-of-3 series of games win a set of retro snacks.

=== An-hour special segment: Weekly Idol Award ===
During these corners, the talk is usually held without too much formality. An annual year-closing episode, Weekly Idol Award, started on December 31, 2011. In this episode, the hosts usually review the corners and the appearances of the guests that were featured in the latest year. In 2017, the Award show will be held outdoors.

== Cast ==
=== Hosts ===
Season	Name	# Episodes
Current
6	Minhyuk (Monsta X)	696–707
6	Hyeongjun (Cravity)	696–707
Former
1	Jung Hyung-don	1‍–‍226, 271‍–‍348
1	Defconn	1–348
1	Heechul (Super Junior)	229‍–‍230, 249, 245‍–‍270, 261‍–‍262, 275, 300
1	Hani (EXID)	245‍–‍270, 275, 300
2	Lee Sang-min	350–384
2	Yoo Se-yoon	350–384
2	Kim Shin-young	350–384
3	Jo Se-ho	389–446
3	Nam Chang-hee	389–446
3	Hwang Kwang-hee (ZE:A)	389–608
3	Eunhyuk (Super Junior)	456–608
4	Seo Eun-kwang (BtoB)	609–644
4	Mijoo (Lovelyz)	609–644
5	Boom	646–695
5	Lee Jang-jun (Golden Child)	646–695

=== Recurring Guest cast ===
Group	Name	# Eps	List of Episodes
BtoB	Ilhoon	97	Grill idol (70, 77, 80); Real chart! Idol self-ranking (83, 85, 95–99, 102); Idol quiz challenge (91); I wonder if you know (104–107, 109–114, 117–141, 143–150, 152–154, 159–168, 170–175, 178–184, 189–191, 194–199, 202–206); Special MC (300)
Apink	Bomi	88	I wonder if you know (104–107, 109–129, 132–139, 143–150, 152–155, 158–162, 164–168, 170, 171, 173–183, 186, 188–199, 202, 204–206); Weekly food tasting (243); Special MC (231, 243, 244)
Apink	Hayoung	25	I wonder if you know (155, 158, 176, 177, 186, 188, 214–216, 219, 220); Weekly food tasting (222, 223, 225, 227, 228, 231–235, 237, 239, 240, 243)
VIXX	N	17	I wonder if you know (214–216, 219); Weekly food tasting (222, 223, 227, 228, 231–235, 237, 239, 240, 243)
AOA	Mina	14	I wonder if you know (214–216, 219, 220); Weekly food tasting (222, 223, 225, 231–235, 237)
Monsta X	Jooheon	13	Idols are the best (246, 249, 250, 252, 254, 255, 258, 264, 265, 267, 276, 278, 279)
Twice	Dahyun	12	Idols are the best (246, 249, 250, 252, 254, 255, 258, 264, 265, 267, 276, 278)
Got7	Jackson	12	Idols are the best (246, 249, 250, 252, 254, 255, 258, 264, 265, 267, 276, 278)
GFriend	SinB	10	Idols are the best (249, 250, 252, 254, 255, 258, 264, 265, 267); Special MC (300)
LoveBerry	Nahyun	5	I wonder if you know (280–285)
BtoB	Eunkwang	3	I wonder if you know (163, 172, 184)
Apink	Namjoo	2	I wonder if you know (114, 115)
BtoB	Sungjae	2	I wonder if you know (130, 131)
AOA	Jimin	2	I wonder if you know (140, 141)
AOA	Hyejeong	2	Weekly food tasting (239, 240)
BtoB	Minhyuk	2	Idols are the best (278, 279)

Note: Some occasions, Jeong Hyeong-don and Defconn instead appear as the featured guests ("Hyungdon and Daejun") with their host position replaced by various guest hosts.

=== Guest hosts ===
- Haha (Episode 45)
- Sistar's Hyolyn & Soyou (Episode 45)
- After School's Lizzy (Episodes 52–53)
- Infinite's Sungkyu & Hoya (Episode 64)
- 4Minute's Sohyun (Episodes 75, 84)

==== Idol Relay System ====
Following Jeong Hyeong-don's hiatus from broadcast activities beginning Episode 227, a system was introduced in which idols with whom Hyeong-don is close to would take turns co-hosting the show in his place.

- Infinite's Sungkyu (Episode 227–228)
- Super Junior's Heechul (Episode 229–230)
- Apink's Bomi (Episode 231, 243–244)
- Girls' Generation's Sunny (Episode 232–233)
- Super Junior's Leeteuk (Episode 234–235)
- CNBLUE's Jung Yong-hwa (Episode 236, 238)
- Shinhwa's Andy (Episode 237)
- Beast's Yoon Doo-joon (Episode 239–240)
- K.Will (Episode 241–242)
