= Moon Ji-in =

South Korean actress (born 1986)

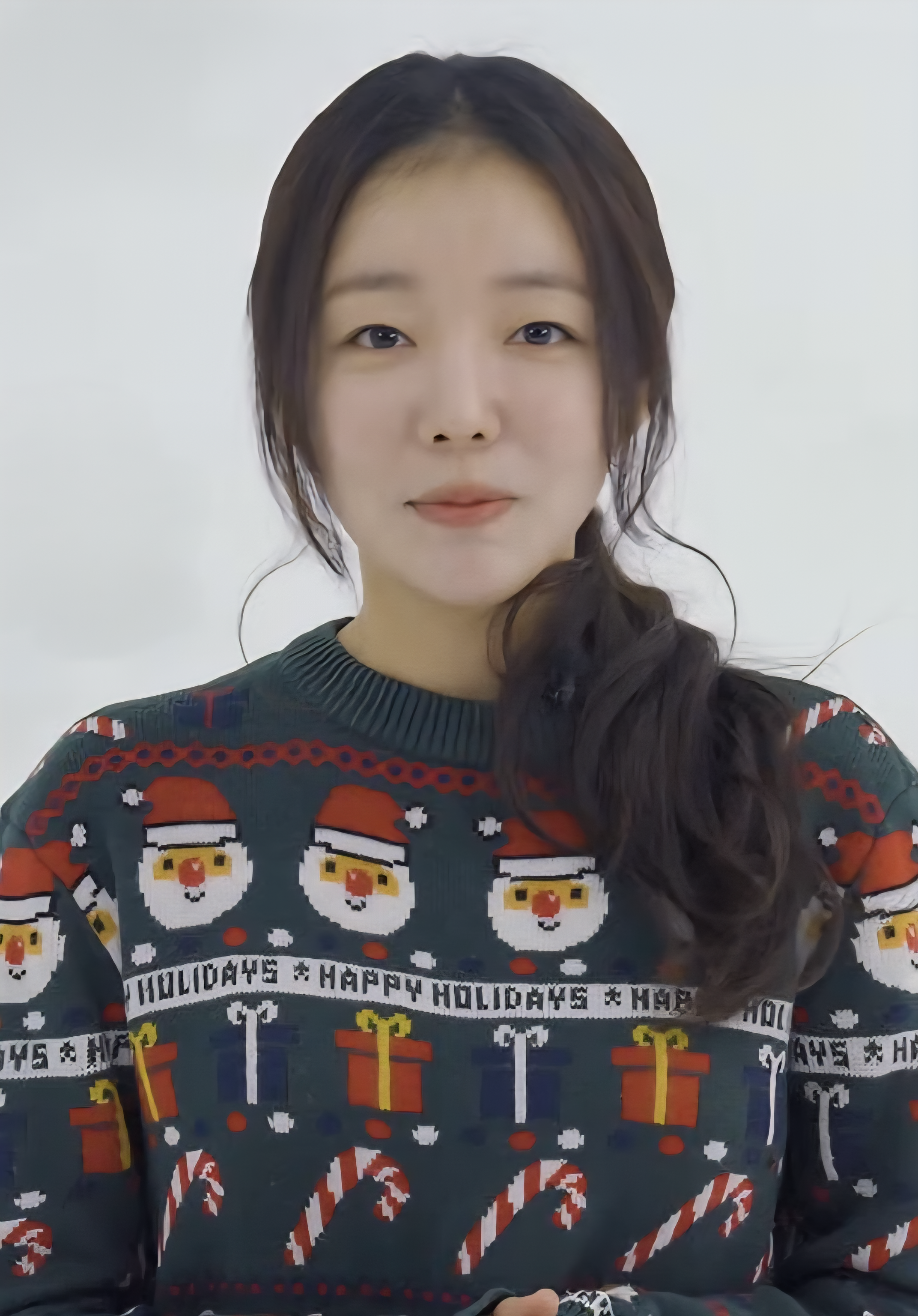
- Moon in November 2024
- Born: Moon Ji-eun; March 1, 1986 (age 40); Chilgok County, North Gyeongsang Province, South Korea
- Education: Seoul Institute of the Arts – Broadcasting and Entertainment
- Occupation: Actress
- Years active: 2006–present
- Agent: IOK Company
- Spouse: Kim Kiri (m. 2024)
- Children: 1

Korean name
- Hangul: 문지은
- RR: Mun Jieun
- MR: Mun Chiŭn

Stage name
- Hangul: 문지인
- RR: Mun Jiin
- MR: Mun Chiin

Moon Ji-eun (Korean: 문지은; born March 1, 1986), better known by the stage name Moon Ji-in, is a South Korean actress. She is best known for her role in the 2016 SBS television series The Doctors.

== Career ==
On February 3, 2012, Moon signed an exclusive contract with Entertainment TONG.

On July 20, 2017, Moon signed with new agency Yuleum Entertainment.

On July 25, 2019, Moon moved to Pan Stars Company, the same agency with Jeon Hye-bin and Pyo Ye-jin.

On May 15, 2020, Moon signed with FNC Entertainment.

In July 2021, Moon signed with IOK Company.

== Personal life ==
On January 29, 2024, Moon's agency confirmed she would marry comedian and actor Kim Kiri in May. The couple married on May 17, 2024, in Seoul. The couple welcomed a son on August 7, 2026.

== Filmography ==
=== Television series ===
Year	Title	Role	Ref.
2007	The Delicious Story		
2009	Temptation of an Angel	Fake family member (cameo, episodes 1 & 17)	
2009	Dream		
2009	Don't Hesitate	Kim Ga-roo	
2010	Jejungwon		
2010	Oh! My Lady		
2010	Giant	Manbo Construction's female employee	
2010	You Don't Know Women	Oh Kyung-ran	
2011	My Love By My Side	Go Soo-bin	
2011	Insu, the Queen Mother	Bok-sil	
2012	Family Portrait	Jung Ha-na	
2013	Secret Love	Hye-jin	
2013	Miss Korea	Kim Yoo-ra	
2014	You're All Surrounded	Choi Soo-young (cameo, episode 10)	
2014	The Idle Mermaid	Disappeared mermaid (cameo)	
2014	It's Okay, That's Love	Min-young	
2015	Run Toward Tomorrow	(cameo)	
2015	KBS Drama Special: "Funny Woman"	Go Eun-hee	
2015	Yong-pal	Nurse Song	
2015	The Village: Achiara's Secret	Soon-young	
2016	Madame Antoine	Lee Kyung-joo (cameo, episode 1 & 5)	
2016	Tomorrow Boy	Seo Shin-young	
2016	The Doctors	Cheon Soon-hee	
2016	Dr. Romantic	Kim Ah-ra, Yoon Seo-jeong's friend (cameo, episode 1)	
2017	Temperature of Love	Hyun-soo drama actress (cameo, episode 38)	
2017	Two Cops	Gil Da-jeong	
2018	Grand Prince	Ggeut-dan	
2018	The Beauty Inside	Yoo Woo-mi	
2019	Leverage	Hong Se-young (cameo)	
2020	18 Again	Wife in couples in crisis (cameo, episode 11)	
2021	Times	Myung Soo-kyung	
2022	Kill Heel	Noh Seong-woo	
2024	My Sweet Mobster	Gu Mi-ho	

=== Film ===
Year	Title	Role	Ref.
2006	Parade	Female student 1	
2015	C'est si bon	Juk ("Porridge")	
2019	Beautiful Voice (Hakuna Matata Pole Pole)	Song Yoo-ri	

=== Music video appearances ===
Year	Song title	Artist	Ref.
2013	"뚱뚱해도 난좋아"	Kang Hani	
2013	"Hot Hot Hot"	Kim Hyung-joong	

=== Television shows ===
Year	Title	Role	Notes	Ref.
2022–present	Goal Girl	Cast Member	Season 3	

== Awards and nominations ==
Year	Award	Category	Nominated work	Result	Ref.
2015	KBS Drama Awards	Excellence Award, Actress in a One-Act/Special/Short Drama	Drama Special – Funny Woman	Nominated	
2016	SBS Drama Awards	Special Award, Actress in a Genre Drama	The Doctors	Nominated	
2016	SBS Drama Awards	New Star Award	The Doctors	Won	
2017	MBC Drama Awards	Golden Acting Award, Actress in a Monday-Tuesday Drama	Two Cops	Nominated	
