= Daejeon University =

Private university in Daejeon, South Korea

Coordinates: 36.336°N 127.460°E

- Established: 1979 (University status on 1989)
- President: Lee Jongseo
- Location: 96-3 Yonggun-Dong, Dong-Gu, Daejeon, 300-716 Daejeon, Korea, Daejeon, Daejeon, South Korea
- Campus: Urban(Daejeon Campus)
- Mascot: The Magpie
- Website: www.dju.ac.kr

- Daejeon University
- Hangul: 대전대학교
- Hanja: 大田大學校
- RR: Daejeon daehakgyo
- MR: Taejŏn taehakkyo

Daejeon University (Korean: 대전대학교) is a private university located in Daejeon, South Korea. About 230 instructors are employed, with Lim Yong-Cheol (임용철) as the current president. The university also operates four Oriental medicine hospitals, two in Daejeon and the others in Chungju and Chunan.

== History ==
The school first opened in 1981 as Daejeon College (대전대학). The affiliated Oriental Medicine Hospital opened in the following year. The graduate school opened in 1987, and the college became a university in 1988.

== Academics ==
Undergraduate School

- College of Humanities & Arts
- College of International Languages & Culture
- College of Law
- College of Management
- College of Engineering
- College of Applied Industry
- College of Health & Sports Science
- College of Oriental Medicine

Graduate School

- Graduate School of General
- Graduate School of Management and Social Work
- Graduate School of Business Information
- Graduate School of Education
- Graduate School of Health and Sports

== Linkages ==
Daejeon University has strong links with the ASEAN University Network, whereby jointly through the ASEAN Exchange Student Program, both institutions aim to develop interregional friendship between the Republic of Korea and South East Asian countries. Up to 2012, there have been 10 batches of exchange students coming from South East Asian nations to study a wide array of subjects at Daejeon University. In 2012, there was a significant change in the exchange program where it only focuses on 5 nations: Cambodia, Philippines, Laos, Myanmar, and Vietnam (CPLMV).

== Notable alumni ==
- Baek Bong-ki, actor
- Oh Sang-uk, Olympic fencer

== See also ==
- List of colleges and universities in South Korea
- Education in South Korea
