= N (singer) =

South Korean singer and actor (born 1990)

- N in 2026
- Born: Cha Hak-yeon; June 30, 1990 (age 36); Changwon, South Korea
- Education: Howon University; Dankook University
- Occupations: Singer; actor; presenter
- Agent: 51K
- Musical career
- Genres: K-pop; dance
- Instrument: Vocals
- Years active: 2012–present
- Labels: Jellyfish; 51K
- Member of: VIXX
- Formerly of: Big Byung

Korean name
- Hangul: 차학연
- RR: Cha Hakyeon
- MR: Ch'a Hagyŏn

Cha Hak-yeon (Korean: 차학연, born June 30, 1990), known professionally as N (엔), is a South Korean singer, actor, presenter, and radio host, signed to 51k. He debuted as a member of the South Korean boy band VIXX in May 2012.

He began his acting career in 2014 in MBC's romantic-melodrama Hotel King as Noah. He has since had roles in The Family is Coming (2015), Cheer Up! (2015) andTomorrow Boy (2016). He was a part of the lead cast in Castaway Diva (2023) and Oh My Ghost Clients (2025). N began his career as a radio host in May 2015 with his show VIXX N K-pop on SBS Power FM.

== Early life ==
Born in Changwon, South Korea, N's family consists of himself, his parents, one older brother and two older sisters. N studied at Howon University and spent a year in Japan. Before debuting with VIXX, N participated in a musical called Gwanghwamun Love Song and entered in dance competitions. He had an extensive dance background, specializing in hip-hop, ballet, jazz and contemporary. In 2009, he participated and won various competitions held by big entertainment agencies such as SM, YG, and JYP. His blindfold dance, which he personally choreographed, won the Grand Prize at the Korean Youth Dance Festival.

== Career ==
=== 2012–2013: Debut with VIXX and variety show appearances ===
N was one of ten trainees who were contestants in Mnet's survival reality show MyDOL and was chosen to be a part of the final line-up and the 6-member boy group VIXX finally debuted with "Super Hero" on May 24, 2012 on M! Countdown. Prior to participating in MyDOL, N was featured in Brian Joo's "Let This Die" and Seo In-guk's "Shake It Up" music videos. In the year 2012, after VIXX's debut, N became a cast member in the second season of TVN's reality television show The Romantic & Idol.

In 2013 with the release of VIXX's album, Jekyll N created the choreography to go along with title song "G.R.8.U" of the repackaged Hyde mini-album; he also appeared in Episode 4 of SBS's Television Drama The Heirs alongside his group members. That same year, he choreographed other VIXX performances for their song "Light Up the Darkness" and for a special performance on the show Dancing 9 with Justin Timberlake's "LoveStoned".

=== 2014–2015: Big Byung, acting debut, MC-ing and Radio Hosting ===
In 2014, N appeared in many variety shows as a cast member such as Mnet's 4 Things Show, TVN's First Day of Work Season 3 and MBC Every 1's Hitmaker. In Hitmaker, he became a member of Jeong Hyeong-don and Defconn's first project group, Big Byung, alongside VIXX member Hyuk, Got7's Jackson and BtoB's Sungjae. Going by the stage name Dol Baeki, N and the group created two singles "Stress Come On" and "Ojingeo Doenjang" (Korean: 오징어 된장). N was cast in his first television drama in a supporting role as Noah, a bright and lively hotel employee in MBC's romantic-melodrama Hotel King. and appeared with Hongbin as a cameo in K.Will, Mamamoo and Wheesung's "Peppermint Chocolate" music video.

In 2015, N was cast in his second television drama in a supporting role as Cha Hak-yeon in SBS's The Family Is Coming and also appeared on Running Man alongside other idols, later he joined Super Junior's Eunhyuk and Kangin as cast members of MBC Every 1's Bachelor's Party. On April 25, 2015, N joined SHINee's Minho and Red Velvet's Yeri as MC on MBC's Show! Music Core from April 25, 2015, to November 14, 2015. On May 2, 2015, N's own radio show VIXX N K-pop premiered on the radio with N as the host and fellow member Ken as a fixed guest for the Quiz King segment (every Wednesday). N was also appearing on Super Junior Kiss the Radio as a fixed guest hosted by Super Junior's Ryeowook.

On July 7, 2015, N went Off to School at Hyundai Chungun High School in Ulsan, South Korea for three days as a student in JTBC's variety program Off to School alongside other celebrities. Towards the end of July, N was confirmed to join the cast in SBS's survival variety show Law of the Jungle in Nicaragua; the show aired in September. In August 2015, N was appointed as co-MC on Weekly Idol with AOA's Mina and Apink's Ha-young. He was the MC of the show with the main MC's Jeong Hyeong-don and Defconn from September 2, 2015, to March 24, 2016 In September 2015, N was cast as Ha Dong-jae, a character who is brilliant yet has an oddball personality in KBS's drama Cheer Up! which follows the lives of students at a prestigious boarding high school as they form a cheer-leading club.

=== 2016–2018: Web dramas, First OST and musical theatre debut ===
In February 2016, N was cast in his first web drama as Ahn Tae-pyung, a character who takes care of his grandmother and three siblings after his parents' death in the web drama Tomorrow Boy which aired on Naver TV Cast in March. In September, N participated in his first original soundtrack for a drama. N and Melody Day's Yeoeun released the song "Without You" (Korean: 니가 없는 난) for the drama W on September 7, 2016. In the same month, N was cast alongside fellow VIXX member Lee Hong-bin and AOA's Chanmi in the web drama What's Up With These Kids? which will air on Naver TV Cast on November 16. In November N was cast in the musical In The Heights as the lead role of Benny from December 20, 2016, to February 12, 2017, at the CJ Towol Theater in Seoul Arts Center. In July 2017, it was announced that he also co-choreographed with Jane Kim for MYTEEN's debut album's Track 4 titled '꺼내가' ('Take it out).

=== 2019–present: Departure from Jellyfish and acting ===
A few months before his enlistment N created his own channel on YouTube where he would share short clips of him dancing, touring, etc. under the title "오늘의 기록" Today's Record. On October 31, 2020, N left Jellyfish Entertainment after he decided not to renew his contract and joined 51k on November 3. In 2021, N starred in the tvN drama Mine. The same year, he played a supporting role as Oh Kyung-tae, a warm-hearted police constable in tvN drama Bad and Crazy.

In 2022, N starred in KBS Drama Special television film Stain, which earns him Best Actor in Drama Special/TV Cinema award at the 2022 KBS Drama Awards.

In 2023, N portrayed Yoo Ji-sun in the historical drama Joseon Attorney and Kang Woo-hak in the television series Castaway Diva.

In 2025, N played Go Gyeon-woo in the television series Oh My Ghost Clients, Song Yu-chan in the Netflix series You and Everything Else, and Yun Je in the television series The Killer Next Door, his first Boys' love drama.

In 2026, N portrayed Ga Woo-su in Coupang Play series Absolute Value of Romance. He also reunited with VIXX for the group's Case No. VIXX fan concert in Seoul, marking the group's return to full-group activities after 7 years. N also held his first solo fan meeting in Beijing in September 5, then scheduled to continue his A! Cha Hakyeon fan meeting series in Tokyo and Seoul in November 7 and 23th respectively. He is also cast in the JTBC drama Gold Digger, scheduled to air in 2027.

== Personal life ==
In 2018, N passed South Korea's national figure-skating certification examination.

On March 4, 2019, N enlisted for his military service. On October 7, 2020, N was officially discharged after having completed his military service.

== Discography ==
=== Singles ===
Title	Year	Peak chart position	Sales	Album
Title	Year	KOR Gaon	Sales	Album
As a lead artist
"Cactus" (선인장)	2018	—	—N/a	Non-album single
"TDTD" (투닥투닥)	2019	—	—N/a	Non-album single
Collaborations
"Stress Come On" (with Hyuk, Jackson and Sungjae as Big Byung)	2014	—	—N/a	Non-album singles
"Ojingeo Doenjang" (오징어 된장) (with Hyuk, Jackson and Sungjae as Big Byung)	2015	—	—N/a	Non-album singles
Original soundtracks
"Without You" (니가 없는 난) (with Yeoeun of Melody Day)	2016	98	KOR: 26,260+	W OST Part.9
"Edge" (가장자리)	2018	—	—	Children of Nobody OST Part 4
"—" denotes releases that did not chart or were not released in that region.

=== Other recordings ===
Year	Song	Note
2015	"Higher Than Me"	Shin Seung-hun cover
2017	"Tearful"	Go Han-woo cover

=== Songwriting credits ===
All song credits are adapted from the Korea Music Copyright Association's database unless stated otherwise.

Year	Song	Album	Artist	Role
2016	"As the Night Gets Deeper" (밤이깊을수록)	Non-album single	N (VIXX)	Lyricist, composer, and arranger
2017	"Cactus" (サボテン)	Lalala ~ Thank you for your love ~ (ラララ ～愛をありがとう～)	VIXX	Lyricist and composer
2018	"Resemble" (닮아)	Eau De VIXX	VIXX	Lyricist and composer
2019	"Walking" (걷고있다)	Walking (걷고있다)	VIXX	Lyricist with Ravi and composer
2019	"TDTD" (투닥투닥)	Non-album single	N (VIXX)	Lyricist and composer

== Filmography ==
=== Movies ===
Year	Title	Role	Notes	Ref.
2025	Midnight Sun	Min Jun		

=== Television series ===
Key
†	Denotes television productions that have not yet been released

Year	Title	Role	Notes	Ref.
2013	The Heirs	Himself	Cameo with VIXX members (Episode 4)	
2014	Hotel King	Noah		
2015	The Family is Coming	Cha Hak-yeon		
2015	Cheer Up!	Ha Dong-jae		
2017	Tunnel	Park Kwang-ho		
2017	Ms. Perfect	Brian Lee		
2018	Familiar Wife	Kim Hwan		
2018	Children of Nobody	Lee Eun-ho		
2021	Drama Stage – The Fair	Go Do-young	Season 4; Episode 8	
2021	Mine	Han Soo-hyuk		
2021	Secret Royal Inspector & Joy	Choi Seung-yeol	Cameo (Episode 9–11, 14)	
2021–2022	Bad and Crazy	Oh Kyung-tae		
2022	Tomorrow	Kim Hoon	Cameo (Episode 9)	
2022	Drama Special – Stain	Gong Ji-hoon	one act-drama	
2023	Joseon Attorney	Yoo Ji-seon		
2023	Castaway Diva	Kang Woo-hak		
2025	Oh My Ghost Clients	Go Gyeon-woo		
2025	You and Everything Else	Song Yu-chan		
2026	Absolute Value of Romance	Ga U-su		
2027	Gold Digger †	Seo Hyeon-cheol		
TBA	End Up in Inkigayo †	Lee Dong-min		

=== Web shows ===
Year	Title	Role	Ref.
2016	Tomorrow Boy	Ahn Tae-pyung	
2016	What's Up With These Kids?	Choi Geum-son	
2025	The Killer Next Door	Nam Yun-je	

=== Television shows ===
Year	Title	Role	Notes	Ref.
2012	The Romantic & Idol Season 2	Cast member		
2014	4 Things Show	Main star		
2014	Hitmaker	Cast member		
2014	First Day Of Work	Cast member	Season 3	
2015	Hitmaker	Cast member	Season 2	
2015	Show! Music Core	Co-Host	with Yeri (Red Velvet) and Minho (Shinee)	
2015	Bachelor's Party	Cast member		
2015	100 People, 100 Songs	Contestant		
2015	Off to School	Cast member	Episodes 53–56	
2015	Law of the Jungle in Nicaragua	Cast member	Episodes 181–184	
2015–2016	Weekly Idol	Assistant MC	with Mina (AOA) and Oh Ha-young (Apink)	
2016	Celebrity Bromance	Cast member	Season 7; with Lee Won-keun	
2017	King of Mask Singer	Contestant	as "Got My Favorite Dartman" (Episode 101)	
2017	Lipstick Prince	Co-Host	Season 2	
2018	Music Bank	Special MC	with Ahn Sol-bin (Episode 929)	
2018	Battle Trip	Contestant	Episode 78; with Hongbin (Episode 91-93)	

=== Radio shows ===
Year	Title	Role	Notes	Ref.
2015	VIXX N K-pop	Host	from May 2, 2015 to November 2, 2015	

=== Audiobook narration ===
Year	Title	Publisher	Notes	Ref.
2019	Complete Peter Rabbit Series	Naver's Audioclip	With VIXX Hyuk	

== Musicals ==
Year	Title	Role	Notes	Ref.
2011	Gwanghwamun Love Song	—N/a		
2016–2017	In The Heights	Benny		
2017–2018	Interview	Gordon Sinclair		
2019–2020	Return: The Promise of the Day	Hae Il	Military theater	

== Concerts, live performances, & fanmeetings ==
Year	Title	City	Country	Location	Ref.
2016	APM New Year Opening Ceremony (「潮猴躍動迎新春」揭幕禮)	Hong Kong	Hong Kong	APM Mall	
2017	N with You	Taipei	Taiwan	Att Show Box	
2017	2017 N's Birthday Home Party Mini Live ～N返し～	Sapporo	Japan	Zepp Sapporo	
2017	2017 N's Birthday Home Party Mini Live ～N返し～	Tokyo	Japan	Zepp Tokyo	
2017	2017 N's Birthday Home Party Mini Live ～N返し～	Osaka	Japan	Matsushita IMP Hall	
2017	2017 N's Birthday Home Party Mini Live ～N返し～	Fukuoka	Japan	ACROS Fukuoka	
2017	APM Christmas Lighting Ceremony & N Sign and Sing Event	Hong Kong	Hong Kong	APM Mall	
2018	N Gaeshi 2018 Take A Trip To Japan (えん返し 2018 Take A Trip To Japan)	Sapporo	Japan	Zepp Sapporo	
2018	N Gaeshi 2018 Take A Trip To Japan (えん返し 2018 Take A Trip To Japan)	Nagoya	Japan	Zepp Nagoya	
2018	N Gaeshi 2018 Take A Trip To Japan (えん返し 2018 Take A Trip To Japan)	Osaka	Japan	Zepp Namba	
2018	N Gaeshi 2018 Take A Trip To Japan (えん返し 2018 Take A Trip To Japan)	Fukuoka	Japan	IMS Hall	
2018	N Gaeshi 2018 Take A Trip To Japan (えん返し 2018 Take A Trip To Japan)	Tokyo	Japan	Shibuya Cultural Center Owada Sakura Hall	
2019	VIXX N Fanmeeting 2019 <A! Cha Hakyeon> (VIXX N 팬미팅 2019 〈아！차학연〉)	Seoul	South Korea	Sejong University's Ocean Hall	
2019	VIXX N Fanmeeting 2019 <A! Cha Hakyeon> (VIXX N 팬미팅 2019 〈아！차학연〉)	Osaka	Japan	Dojima River Forum	
2019	VIXX N Fanmeeting 2019 <A! Cha Hakyeon> (VIXX N 팬미팅 2019 〈아！차학연〉)	Tokyo	Japan	Zepp Tokyo	
2022	2022 Cha Hakyeon Fanmeeting [Return of A! Cha Hak-yeon] (2022 차학연 팬미팅 [돌아온 A! 차학연])	Seoul	South Korea	YES24 Live Hall	
2022	2022 Cha Hakyeon Fanmeeting ~I'm Home~ (2022 チャ・ハギョン ファンミーティング ～ただいま～)	Tokyo	Japan	Nakano ZERO Grand Hall	
2022	2022 Cha Hakyeon Fanmeeting ~I'm Home~ (2022 チャ・ハギョン ファンミーティング ～ただいま～)	Osaka	Japan	Ikeda City Culture Hall	
2023	2023 Cha Hakyeon Fanmeeting (2023 차학연 팬미팅 [Check-in to A! CHA HAK YEON])	Seoul	South Korea	YES24 Live Hall	
2023	2023 Cha Hakyeon Fanmeeting (2023 차학연 팬미팅 [Check-in to A! CHA HAK YEON])	Tokyo	Japan	Hulic Hall Tokyo	
2024	2024 Cha Hakyeon Fan Meeting: [ENSOKU] (2024 チャ・ハギョン ファンミーティング)	Tokyo	Japan	Yomiuri Hall	
2025	2025 Cha Hakyeon Fanmeeting (2025 차학연 팬미팅 [CHANNEL A! CHAHAKYEON])	Seoul	South Korea	Sungshin Women's University Woonjung Green Campus Grand Hall	
2025	2025 Cha Hakyeon Fanmeeting (2025 차학연 팬미팅 [CHANNEL A! CHAHAKYEON])	Tokyo	Japan	Yurakucho Yomiuri Hall	
2026	Cha Hakyeon Beijing Fanmeeting 「'沇'续」(Continuity)	Beijing	China		
2026	2026 Cha Hakyeon Fanmeeting (2026 차학연 팬미팅 [ATTENDANCE! A!CHAHAKYEON])	Seoul	South Korea	Cube Convention Center	
2026	2026 Cha Hakyeon Fanmeeting (2026 차학연 팬미팅 [ATTENDANCE! A!CHAHAKYEON])	Tokyo	Japan	Nissho Hall	

== Awards and nominations ==
Name of the award ceremony, year presented, category, nominee of the award, and the result of the nomination
Award ceremony	Year	Category	Nominee / Work	Result	Ref.
KBS Drama Awards	2022	Best Actor in Drama Special/TV Cinema	The Stains	Won	
