= Hyuk (singer) =

South Korean singer and actor (born 1995)

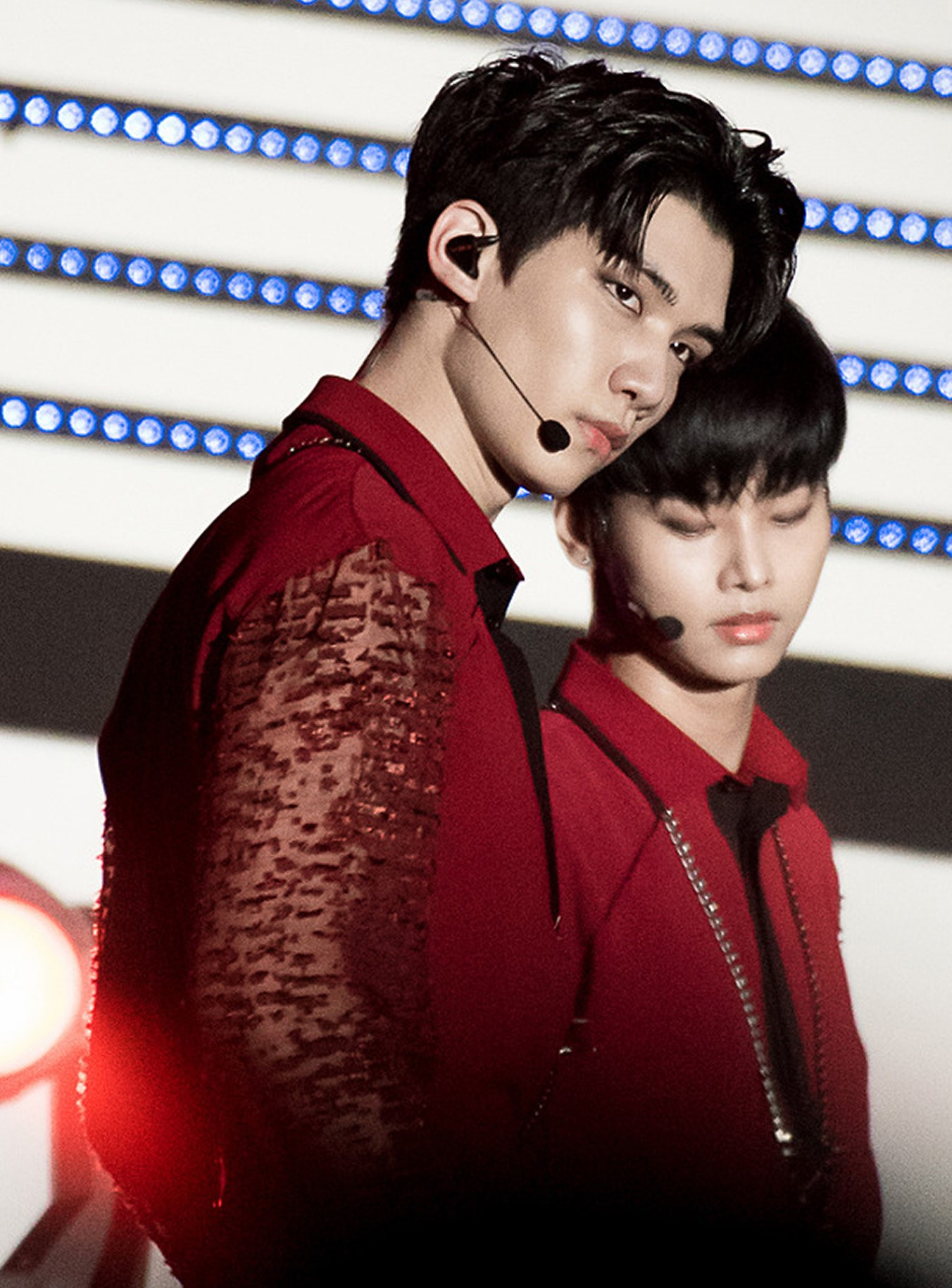
- Hyuk in 2016
- Born: Han Sang-hyuk; July 5, 1995 (age 31); Daejeon, South Korea
- Education: Hanlim Multi Art School; Dong-Ah Institute of Media and Arts
- Occupations: Singer; actor; director
- Musical career
- Genres: K-pop; dance
- Instrument: Vocals
- Years active: 2012–present
- Labels: Companion Company; Jellyfish (until 2022)
- Member of: VIXX
- Formerly of: Big Byung

Korean name
- Hangul: 한상혁
- RR: Han Sanghyeok
- MR: Han Sanghyŏk

Han Sang-hyuk (Korean: 한상혁 born July 5, 1995), known professionally as Hyuk (혁), is a South Korean singer and actor. Hyuk debuted as a member of the South Korean boy group VIXX in May 2012, and began his acting career in 2016 in the comedy-action film Chasing as Han Won-tae. In February 2023, he formed Ad.A, a creative project crew comprising producers and video directors, to produce music and video content.

== Early life ==
Hyuk was born and raised in Daejeon, South Korea. His family consists of himself, his parents and one older sister. He studied Practical Music at Hanlim Multi Art School and K-Pop Performance major at Dong-Ah Institute of Media and Arts.

== Career ==
=== 2012–2014: Debut with VIXX and variety shows ===
Hyuk was one of ten trainees who were contestants in Mnet's survival reality show MyDOL and was chosen to be a part of the final line-up and the 6-member boy group VIXX finally debuted with "Super Hero" on May 24, 2012, on M! Countdown.

In 2013, Hyuk appeared in episode 4 of SBS' television drama The Heirs alongside his group members.

In 2014, Hyuk appeared as a small cameo role in SBS's television drama Glorious Day alongside Leo and was a cast member in SBS's Law of the Jungle in Brazil. He was also a cast member of MBC Every 1's Hitmaker, in which he became a member and leader of Jung Hyung Don and Defconn's first project group, Big Byung, alongside VIXX member N, Got7's Jackson and BtoB's Sungjae. Going by the stage name Hyuk-di, Hyuk and the group created two singles: "Stress Come On" and "Ojingeo Doenjang" (Korean: 오징어 된장).

On October 21, 2015, Hyuk's recorded solo cover of Jeff Bernat’s "Call You Mine", was uploaded exclusively to VIXX’s official YouTube channel, it was previously performed during VIXX’s LIVE FANTASIA UTOPIA concerts.

=== 2015–2019: Film debut and solo music ===
In 2015, Hyuk was cast in the comedy-action film Chasing, marking his acting debut. The film was released in theaters in South Korea on January 7, 2016. For his work in Chasing, Hyuk won the Best Action Movie New Performer Award at the 2016 Shanghai International Film Festival.

In late 2016, Hyuk contributed to the lyrics of VIXX's song "Milky Way" from their special album VIXX 2016 Conception Ker.

On January 25, 2017, Hyuk released his very first self-composed song as a gift for fans for Lunar New Year, with the title "Hug" (Korean: 안아줄게; RR: An-ajulge; lit. "I'll Hold You") on his official SoundCloud and on VIXX's official YouTube Channel.

In 2017, he made his leading television role debut in the web drama Romance Special Law. In October 2017, he has been confirmed to star in "Happy Together" alongside veteran actor Park Sung Woong as Ha Neul, the filial son to his father. Hyuk alongside the other three lead actors learned to play on saxophone for the film..

On January 8, 2019, it was confirmed that Hyuk would release his first solo single on January 12, 2019, titled "Boy with a Star". He is credited for the lyrics and composition of the song. Hyuk was later cast in the Forgotten Village play as Jae-gu, a professor at a young age from Law School of Seoul National University. The show took place at Chungmu Art Hall from February 22 to April 7.

In April 2019, Hyuk performed "Boy with a Star" in a collaborative stage with figure skater Cha Jun-hwan at the LG ThinQ Ice Fantasia 2019 ice show.

=== 2020–2023: Departure from Jellyfish Entertainment and formation of Ad.A ===
In June 9, 2020, Hyuk starred in the web drama Ga Doo-ri's Sushi Restaurant. In the same year, He also appeared in the theatrical production of Eyes of Dawn.

In January 21, 2021, he appeared in the film Croissant. In October 14, 2021, Hyuk also starred in the movie A Different Girl.

In January 21, 2022, he starred in the second season of the web series Color Rush. On September 29 of the same year, he released a single titled "Stay for Me" featuring Seo In-guk.

On June 1, 2022, Hyuk announced that he will be leaving Jellyfish Entertainment, while remaining a member of VIXX. In May 2023, he signed an exclusive contract with Companion Company.

On February 14, 2023, Hyuk announced the formation of Ad.A, a creative project crew comprising producers and video directors with whom he had previously worked. In 2023, Hyuk also appeared in the films Body Collection.zip and the theatrical productions Hello, The Hell: Othello and Again, Zoo.

=== 2024–present: Military service and return to activities ===
On March 21, 2024, Hyuk's agency Companion Company announced that he would be starting his mandatory military service as a public service worker on April 18. Before beginning his service, he released the single "Home" and held the fan concert 2024 HYUK FAN CONCERT 'Home' in Seoul.

Hyuk completed his alternative military service on January 17, 2026. Following his discharge, he resumed activities with VIXX and performed with the group at its fan concert Case No. VIXX in Seoul on February 21 and 22, marking the group's first full-group concert in several years.

In February 2026, Hyuk directed the music video for "Always" (지금 이대로만), a duet by singer Park Jae-jung and NMIXX member Sullyoon, with production involvement from Ad.A. In May, he was announced as a cast member of the horror film Pink Box, playing Seong-gyu, a magazine reporter investigating a series of disappearances. In July 11, 2026, he held his first solo fan meeting following his military discharge, titled 2026 HYUK FAN MEETING 'Some-mer Wave'', in Seoul.

== Ad.A ==
On February 14, 2023, Hyuk announced the formation of Ad.A, a creative project crew. The name was inspired by the Latin phrase per ardua ad astra, meaning "through hardship and adversity to the stars". The crew was formed with producers and video directors with whom Hyuk had previously collaborated. Its planned work combines music and video under various concepts, with members participating in music production, creative concept development, video production, and directing.

In February 17, 2023, the crew released their first short film Winter Sleep (Per Ardua Ad Astra) (겨울잠) where Hyuk is credited as the director and the actor. His directorial credits include music videos and other audiovisual projects released in collaboration with Ad.A.

In 2023, Ad.A collaborated with Jellyfish Entertainment on VIXX's fifth mini-album Continuum, contributing to its concept development, visual direction, planning, jacket photography, and music video production.

== Discography ==
=== Extended plays ===
Title	Album details	Peak chart positions	Sales
Title	Album details	KOR	Sales
Winter Butterfly (겨울나비)	Released: December 18, 2019; Label: Jellyfish Entertainment; Format: CD, digital download, streaming; Track listing: 1. "Winter Butterfly (겨울나비)"; 2. "Boy With a Star"; 3. "If Only" (feat. An Daeun of The Ade); 4. "Way to You"; 5. "A Long Night (너의 밤은 아프지 않기를)"; 6. "I'll Hug You (안아줄게) - Concert Ver." (CD Only)	5	KOR: 27,791

=== Singles ===
Title	Year	Album
As lead singer
"Boy With A Star"	2019	Non-album singles
"If Only" (feat. An Daeun of The Ade)	2019	Non-album singles
"Way To You"	2019	Non-album singles
"A Long Night (너의 밤은 아프지 않기를)"	2019	Non-album singles
"Winter Butterfly (겨울나비)"	2019	Winter Butterfly
"Stay For Me" (feat. Seo In-guk)	2022	Non-album singles
"Around Thirty"	2023	Non-album singles
"Home"	2024	Non-album singles
Collaborations
"Stress Come On" (with N, Jackson and Sungjae as Big Byung)	2014	Non-album singles
"Ojingeo Doenjang (오징어 된장)" (with N, Jackson and Sungjae as Big Byung)	2015	Non-album singles
"Camellia (동백꽃)" (with Jukjae)	2020	Non-album singles
Soundtrack appearances
"GoodBye My Father"	2019	Happy Together OST
"You, Me and Dream"	2019	The Great Show OST
"Night Left Alone"	2023	Again the zoo OST

=== Other recordings ===
Year	Song	Note
2017	"I'll Hug You" (안아줄게)	Non-album unofficial release

=== Songwriting credits ===
All song credits are adapted from the Korea Music Copyright Association's database unless stated otherwise.

Year	Song	Album	Artist	Role
2016	"Milky Way"	VIXX 2016 Conception Ker	VIXX	Lyricist
2017	"I’ll Hug You (안아줄게)"	Non-album unofficial release	Hyuk	Lyricist and composition
2018	"Good Day"	Eau de VIXX	VIXX	Lyrics and composition
2018	"Trigger"	Eau de VIXX	VIXX	Composition
2018	"Navy & Shining Gold"	Eau de VIXX	VIXX	Composition
2018	"The Rain"	Reincarnation	VIXX	Lyrics and composition
2019	"Winter Butterfly (겨울나비)"	Winter Butterfly (겨울나비)	Hyuk	Lyricist, composition, arrangement
2019	"Boy With a Star"	Boy With a Star	Hyuk	Lyricist and composition
2019	"If Only" (feat. An Daeun of The Ade)	If Only (feat. An Daeun of The Ade)	Hyuk (feat. An Daeun of The Ade)	Lyricist and composition
2019	"Way To You"	Way To You	Hyuk	Lyricist and composition
2019	"A Long Night (너의 밤은 아프지 않기를)"	A Long Night (너의 밤은 아프지 않기를)	Hyuk	Lyricist and composition
2019	"I'll Hug You (안아줄게) - Concert Ver." (CD Only)	Winter Butterfly (겨울나비)	Hyuk	Lyricist and composition
2020	"Camellia (동백꽃)"	Camellia (동백꽃)	Jukjae, Hyuk	Lyricist, composition, arrangement
2022	"Stay For Me" (feat. Seo In Guk)	Stay For Me (feat. Seo In Guk)	Hyuk (feat. Seo In Guk)	Lyricist, composition, arrangement
2023	"Lilac"	Continuum	VIXX	Lyricist and composition
2023	"Gonna Be Alright"	Gonna Be Alright	VIXX	Lyricist and composition
2024	"Home"	Home	Hyuk	Lyricist and composition

== Filmography ==
=== Film ===
Key
†	Denotes films that have not yet been released

Year	Title	Role	Notes	Ref.
2016	Chasing	Han Won-tae	Main role, won Best Action Movie New Performer Award (SIFF)	
2018	Happy Together	Ha-neul	Main role	
2021	Croissant	Hee-joon	Main role	
2021	A Different Girl	Wan-jun		
2022	Body Collection.zip	Min-joon	It premieres at the 26th BIFAN	
TBA	Pink Box †	Seong-gyu	Began filming in May 2026	

=== Directorial works ===
Year	Title	Artist(s)	Role	Notes	Ref.
2023	겨울잠(Per Ardua Ad Astra) Film	Hyuk	Director		
2023	BE MYSELF (FT.NERD MAN)	Hyuk	Creative director, lyrics writer, composer		
2023	'혼자 남은 밤' Official M/V	Hyuk	Director	Music video of the remake of Kim Kwang-seok's song "The Night Alone"	
2023	'BEAUTIFUL DAY' official video	Hyuk, Ryu Seong-hyun	Creative director, lyrics writer, composer		
2023	VIXX 5TH MINI ALBUM [CONTINUUM]	VIXX	Creative director		
2024	애일(愛日)[æ il] MV	Hyuk, Lim Hee-jong	Director, song writer		
2026	Always (지금 이대로만) MV	Parc Jae-jung, Sullyoon (NMIXX)	Director, editor		

=== Television ===
Year	Title	Role	Notes	Ref.
2014	The Heirs	Himself	Cameo ep. 4	
2017	Romance Special Law	Kang Sewoong	First web drama	
2019	The Great Show	Choi Jung-woo		
2020	Ga Doo Ri's Sushi Restaurant	Cha Woo-bin	Lead role	
2022	Color Rush	Se-hyun	Season 2, Main role	

=== Television shows ===
Year	Title	Role	Notes	Ref.
2014–15	Hitmaker	Cast member	As Hyuk Di, 2 seasons	
2014	Law of the Jungle in Brazil	Cast member	Episodes 112–116	
2015	King of Mask Singer	Judge panelist	Episodes 23-24	
2018	A Desired Cruise	Cast member		
2019	King of Mask Singer	Contestant	Episodes 233-234	

=== Theater plays & musicals ===
Year	Title	Role	Notes	Ref.
2019	The Lost Village (잃어버린 마을)	Jae Goo	Cast member	
2020	Eyes of Dawn (여명의 눈동자)	Kwon Dong-jin	Theatrical play version	
2023	Hello, The Hell: Othello (헬로, 더 헬: 오델로)	Iago	Main role, theatrical play reimagination of Othello	
2023	Again, Zoo (다시, 동물원)	The Friend	Main role	

=== Voice work ===
==== Audiobook Narration ====
Year	Title	Author	Publisher	Notes	Ref.
2019	Complete Peter Rabbit Series	Beatrix Potter	Naver's Audioclip	With VIXX N	
2019	The Story of the Strange Dragon Descendant (이상한 용손 이야기)	Kwak Jaesik	Everline	as a part of EBS project “Idols Read, Connecting Hearts” (아이돌이 읽다, 마음을 잇다)	

==== Narrator ====
Year	Title	Notes	Ref.
2020	Life of Koala	An episode of MBC UHD Special Documentary series	

== Concerts & live performances ==
Year	Title	City	Country	Location	Notes	Ref.
2018	HAPPY HYUK DAY［여름아이]	Seoul	South Korea	Shinsegae Mesa Hall		
2019	HYUK SPECIAL BUSKING LIVE	Seoul	South Korea	Coex Live Plaza		
2019	2019 HYUK LIVE TODAY	Seoul	South Korea	MUV Hall		
2019	LG ThinQ Ice Fantasia 2019	Seoul	South Korea	Mokdong Ice Rink	Special collaboration with figure skater Cha Jun-hwan performing the song “Boy With A Star”	
2020	2020 HYUK LIVE TODAY	Live online streaming				
2024	2024 HYUK FAN CONCERT 'Home'	Seoul	South Korea	Sungshin Women's University Woonjung Green Campus Auditorium		
2026	2026 HYUK FAN MEETING 'Some-mer Wave'	Seoul	South Korea	Sungshin Women's University Woonjung Green Campus Auditorium		

== Awards and nominations ==
Year	Award	Category	Nominated work	Result	Ref.
2016	Jackie Chan Action Movie Awards (SIFF)	Best Action Movie New Performer	Chasing	Won	
