= Hitmaker (2014 TV program) =

- Hangul: 형돈이와 대준이의 히트제조기
- RR: Hyeongdoniwa Daejuniui hiteu jejogi
- MR: Hyŏngdoniwa Taejuniŭi hit'ŭ chejogi
- Genre: Variety
- Presented by: Jeong Hyeong-don (Season 1–3); Yong Jun-hyung (Season 3); Defconn (Season 1–2)
- Starring: N (Season 1–2); Hyuk (Season 1–2); Jackson (Season 1–2); Sungjae (Season 1–2); Youngji (Season 2); Sohyun (Season 2); G.NA (Season 2); Lizzy (Season 2); Cha Hun (Season 3)
- Country of origin: South Korea
- Original language: Korean
- No. of seasons: 3

Production
- Production locations: Seoul, South Korea

Original release
- Network: MBC Every1
- Release: July 29, 2014

Hyung-don and Dae-joon's Hitmaker (Korean: 형돈이와 대준이의 히트제조기) is a 2014 South Korean variety television series presented by South Korean producer duo Jeong Hyeong-don and Defconn. It first aired on MBC Every1 on Tuesday at 6:00 pm KST beginning July 29, 2014. It ran for two seasons in 2014 and 2015, documenting the formation and debut processes of their first boy group Big Byung (Korean: 빅병) and their first girl group Chamsonyeo (Korean: 참소녀). It was renewed for another season in 2016, with Season 1 and 2 host Defconn being replaced by Beast's Yong Jun-hyung. The hosts, along with N.Flying's Cha Hun, travelled to Dublin, Ireland, to stage a performance.

== Season 1 ==
In the first season, producer duo Jeong Hyeong-don and Defconn find members to participate in their first boy group, later named Big Byung (Korean: 빅병), using music they wrote and composed. They recruit VIXX's Hyuk and N, Got7's Jackson and BToB's Sungjae. The group then releases two singles: "Stress Come On" and "Ojingeo Doenjang" (Korean: 오징어 된장).

== Season 2 ==
In the second season, Jeong Hyeong-don and Defconn find members to participate in their first girl group, later named Chamsonyeo (Korean: 참소녀), using music they wrote and composed. They recruit Kara's Youngji, After School's Lizzy, G.NA and 4minute's So-hyun. The group released the single "Magic Words" (Korean: 올해의 주문) on February 20.

== Season 3 ==
In the third season, BEAST's Yong Jun-hyung takes over for Defconn as host. The season was filmed in Dublin, Ireland, with Hyeong-don, Jun-hyung and N.Flying's Cha Hun.

== Cast ==
=== Hosts ===
- Jeong Hyeong-don (Season 1—3)
- Defconn (Season 1 & 2)
- Yong Jun-hyung (Season 3)

=== Big Byung ===
Hitmaker stage name	Full name	Role	Originating group
Dol Baeki	Cha Hak-yeon (N)	Vocalist, Rapper	VIXX
Wang Kong	Jackson Wang	Rapper	Got7
Yook Deok	Yook Sungjae	Main Vocal, Rapper	BtoB
Hyuk Ddi	Han Sang-hyuk (Hyuk)	Leader, Vocalist, Rapper	VIXX

=== Chamsonyeo ===
Hitmaker stage name	Full name	Role	Originating group
Bak Ha	Gina Jane Choi (G.NA)	Vocalist	solo singer
Kye Pi	Park Soo-young (Lizzy)	Vocalist	After School
Nun Ggari	Heo Young-ji	Vocalist	Kara
Yeot	Kwon So-hyun	Leader, Rapper, Vocalist	4Minute

=== LUDONPH YONGJUNKO ===
Full name	Role	Originating group
Jeong Hyeong-don	Lyrics	Hyungdon & Daejun
Yong Jun-hyung	Composer, Lyrics, Rapper	Beast
Park Sun-young (Luna)	Vocalist	f(x)

== Discography ==
=== Singles ===
Year	Project unit	Song	Album
2014	Big Byung (빅병)	"Stress Come On"	Non-album single
2015	Big Byung (빅병)	"Ojingeo Doenjang" (오징어 된장)	Non-album single
2015	Chamsonyeo (참소녀)	"Magic Words" (Korean: 올해의 주문)	Non-album single
2017	LUDONPH YONGJUNKO (루돈프 용준코)	"Tell me It's Okay" (괜찮다고 말해줘)	Non-album single

=== Music videos ===
Year	Project unit	Song
2014	Big Byung (빅병)	"Stress Come On"
2015	Big Byung (빅병)	"Ojingeo Doenjang" (오징어 된장)
2015	Chamsonyeo (참소녀)	"Magic Words" (올해의 주문)
2017	LUDONPH YONGJUNKO (루돈프 용준코)	"Tell me It's Okay" (괜찮다고 말해줘)

== Awards and nominations ==
Year	Award	Category	Nominated work	Result
2014	I.K.M.A Awards	Most Funny Music Video	"Stress Come On" (Big Byung)	Nominated
