= M.Pire =

2013–2015 South Korean boyband

- Origin: Seoul, South Korea
- Genres: K-Pop
- Years active: 2013–2015
- Labels: Benjamin Entertainment; CMG Chorok Stars; KT Music
- Members: Taehee; Lumin; Yooseung; Haru; Red; T.O; Jerry

M.Pire (Korean: 엠파이어; pronounced as 'empire') was a seven-member South Korean boy band signed under CMG Chorok Stars. The group debuted on August 1, 2013, with six members, Taehee, Yooseung, Lumin, Haru, Red, T.O, and Jerry. Member Lumin, formerly known as LeeU of F.Cuz, joined the group in October 2013.

The name 'M.Pire' combines the words 'music' and 'vampire', signifying the need for the group to live off of music. M.Pire's fandom name is Muse (뮤즈), an acronym standing for: Mind, Understand, Special, and Encourage.

== History ==
=== Pre-debut ===
Taehee and Yooseung debuted as a part of BB.BBOYS, a male Korean pop trio, that debuted in 2011. The group released a mini-album 'First Album' and an OST track in 2011, but disbanded in 2012.

Yooseung and Taehee became trainees under Benjamin Entertainment, a subsidiary of CMG Chorok Stars. On May 1, Benjamin Entertainment revealed M.Pire as a six-member group. However instead of T.O, there was a sixth member named Kangon (currently a member of the group M.Peror). They performed as M.Pire for the first time at the "2013 Dream Concert" held May 11 at the World Cup Stadium in Seoul ahead of their official debut.

M.Pire eventually made their official debut on August 1, 2013, with six members: Taehee, Yooseung, Haru, Red, T.O, Jerry. All six members went through 3 years of hardcore training prior to their debut.

=== 2013: Can't Be Friends With You, On My Mind ===
The group officially debuted on August 1, 2013, with their title track "Can't Be Friends With You", a hip-hop dance song, composed by Hong Sung Min and written by Ddori Jang Gun. Their debut stage was on Mnet's "M Countdown".

On the October 16th broadcast of Channel A's 'Star Family Song' former member LeeU of F.Cuz revealed that he had joined the rookie group and changed his stage name to Lumin. On October 27 an audio teaser of the song ‘On My Mind’ was released through Benjamin Entertainment's Official YouTube account. The song was written and composed by JYJ's Kim Jaejoong as a gift to the group. It was also revealed that member Yooseung assisted in writing the rap verse for "On My Mind". The official comeback track and title song of their second single album "New Born" is "Kkadak Kkadak". M.Pire will kick off promotions for their fall comeback with a performance on M! Countdown on October 31.

== Members ==
- Taehee (태희)
- Useung (유승)
- Lumin (루민)
- Red (레드)
- Haru (하루)
- T.O. (티오)
- Jerry (제리)

== Discography ==
=== Single albums ===
Year	Album details	Peak chart positions		Sales
Year	Album details	Gaon Weekly	Gaon Monthly	Sales
2013	"Carpe Diem": Released: August 1, 2013; Format: digital download; Label: Benjamin Entertainment; Track listing: 1. "너랑 친구 못해 (Can't Be Friends With You)"; 2. "너랑 친구 못해 (Can't Be Friends With You) (Inst.)"	–	–	KOR: –
2013	"New Born": Released: October 30, 2013; Format: CD, digital download; Label: Benjamin Entertainment; Track listing: 1. "까딱까딱 (I'm Better)"; 2. "On My Mind"; 3. "너랑 친구 못해 (Can't Be Friends With You)"; 4. "까딱까딱 (I'm Better) (Inst.)"; 5. "On My Mind (Inst.)"; 6. "너랑 친구 못해 (Can't Be Friends With You) (Inst.)"	19	61	KOR: 1,000+
2014	"Rumor": Released: May 15, 2014; Format: CD, digital download; Label: Benjamin Entertainment; Track listing: 1. "그런 애 아니야 (Not That Kind of Person)"; 2. "별이 되어…(0324) (Be A Star)"; 3. "그런 애 아니야 (Not That Kind of Person) (Inst.)"; 4. "별이 되어…(0324) (Be A Star) (Inst.)"	22	64	KOR: 820+

=== Singles ===
Title	Year	Album
"Can't Be Friends With You"	2013	New Born
"Carpe Diem"	2013	New Born
"Not That Kind of Person"	2014	Rumor

== Filmography ==
=== Music videos ===
Year	Music video	Length
2013	"Can't Be Friends With You"	3:45
2014	"Not That Kind of Person"	4:05

== List of awards and nominations ==
=== Hawaii International Music Award Festival (HIMAF) ===
Year	Nominee / work	Award	Result
2013	M.Pire	Rising Star	Won

=== Korean Wave Industry Awards ===
Year	Nominee / work	Award	Result
2013	M.Pire	Rookie Award	Won

=== Asia Model Awards ===
Year	Nominee / work	Award	Result
2014	M.Pire	New Star Award	Won
