= List of awards and nominations received by BtoB =

BtoB awards and nominations
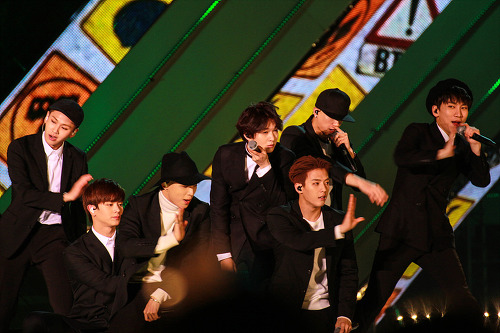
Awards and nominations
Award	Wins	Nominations
Asia Artist Awards	0	4
Gaon Chart Music Awards	0	4
Genie Music Awards	0	6
Golden Disc Awards	3	10
Japan Gold Disc Award	1	1
Korea Popular Music Awards	2	5
Melon Music Awards	1	8
Mnet Asian Music Awards	0	11
Seoul Music Awards	2	20
Soribada Best K-Music Awards	1	3
Other awards	9	13

Totals (Note: Certain award groups do not simply award one winner. They acknowledge several different recipients, have runners-up, and have third place. Since this is a specific recognition and is different from losing an award, runner-up mentions are considered wins in this award tally. For simplification and to avoid errors, each award in this list has been presumed to have had a prior nomination.)
- Wins: 20
- Nominations: 85

This is the list of awards and nominations received by South Korean boy group BtoB since their debut in 2012.

== Awards and nominations ==
Name of the award ceremony, year presented, category, nominee(s) of the award, and the result of the nomination
Award ceremony	Year	Category	Nominee / work	Result	Ref.
Asia Artist Awards	2016	Most Popular Artist (Singer) – Top 50	BtoB	7th	
Asia Artist Awards	2017	Popularity Award	BtoB	Nominated	
Asia Artist Awards	2018	Most Popular Artist (Singer) – Top 50	BtoB	Nominated	
Asia Artist Awards	2020	Male Singer Popularity Award	BtoB	Nominated	
Asia Model Festival	2018	Asia Star Award (Singer Category)	BtoB	Won	
CPP Cruise 2018 Busan	2018	Asia Trend Star Award	BtoB	Won	
Cyworld Digital Music Awards	2012	Rookie of the Month (September)	BtoB for "Wow"	Won	
Gaon Chart Music Awards	2018	Song of the Year (March)	"Movie"	Nominated	
Gaon Chart Music Awards	2018	Song of the Year (October)	"Missing You"	Nominated	
Gaon Chart Music Awards	2019	Song of the Year (June)	"Only One For Me"	Nominated	
Gaon Chart Music Awards	2019	Song of the Year (November)	"Beautiful Pain"	Nominated	
Genie Music Awards	2018	Artist of the Year	BtoB	Nominated	
Genie Music Awards	2018	Genie Music Popularity Award	BtoB	Nominated	
Genie Music Awards	2018	Male Group Award	BtoB	Nominated	
Genie Music Awards	2018	Song of the Year	"Missing You"	Nominated	
Genie Music Awards	2018	Vocal Track (Male)	"Missing You"	Nominated	
Genie Music Awards	2019	Best Male Group	BtoB	Nominated	
Global V Live Awards	2017	Global Artist Top 10	BtoB	Won	
Golden Disc Awards	2013	Next Generation Star	BtoB	Won	
Golden Disc Awards	2016	Best Vocal Group	BtoB	Won	
Golden Disc Awards	2016	Disc Bonsang	Complete	Nominated	
Golden Disc Awards	2017	Disc Bonsang	24/7	Nominated	
Golden Disc Awards	2018	Disc Bonsang	Brother Act.	Nominated	
Golden Disc Awards	2018	Popularity Award	BtoB	Nominated	
Golden Disc Awards	2018	Best Male Group	BtoB	Won	
Golden Disc Awards	2019	Disc Daesang	This Is Us	Nominated	
Golden Disc Awards	2019	Popularity Award	BtoB	Nominated	
Golden Disc Awards	2019	NetEase Most Popular K-pop Star	BtoB	Nominated	
Japan Gold Disc Award	2018	Best 3 New Artists (Asia)	BtoB	Won	
KBS Drama Awards	2017	Best OST Award	BtoB for "Ambiguous" (Fight for My Way OST)	Won	
KBS Music Festival	2015	Singer of the Year	BtoB	Won	
Korea Cable TV Awards	2017	Hallyu Star Award	BtoB	Won	
Korea Popular Music Awards	2018	Best Artist	BtoB	Nominated	
Korea Popular Music Awards	2018	Bonsang Award	BtoB	Won	
Korea Popular Music Awards	2018	Popularity Award	BtoB	Nominated	
Korea Popular Music Awards	2018	Best Digital Song	"Missing You"	Nominated	
Korea Popular Music Awards	2018	Ballad Award	"Missing You"	Won	
Melon Music Awards	2015	Top 10 Artists	BtoB	Nominated	
Melon Music Awards	2017	Top 10 Artists	BtoB	Nominated	
Melon Music Awards	2017	Netizen Popularity Award	BtoB	Nominated	
Melon Music Awards	2018	Top 10 Artists	BtoB	Won	
Melon Music Awards	2018	Netizen Popularity Award	BtoB	Nominated	
Melon Music Awards	2018	Artist of the Year	BtoB	Nominated	
Melon Music Awards	2018	Song of the Year	"Only One For Me"	Nominated	
Melon Music Awards	2018	Ballad Award	"Only One For Me"	Nominated	
Mnet Asian Music Awards	2016	Best Vocal Performance Group	BtoB	Nominated	
Mnet Asian Music Awards	2016	Song of the Year	"Remember That"	Nominated	
Mnet Asian Music Awards	2017	2017 Favorite KPOP Star	BtoB	Nominated	
Mnet Asian Music Awards	2017	Best Vocal Performance Group	BtoB	Nominated	
Mnet Asian Music Awards	2017	Song of the Year	"Missing You"	Nominated	
Mnet Asian Music Awards	2018	Best Vocal Performance Group	BtoB	Nominated	
Mnet Asian Music Awards	2018	Favorite Vocal Artist	BtoB	Nominated	
Mnet Asian Music Awards	2018	Song of the Year	"Only One For Me"	Nominated	
Mnet Asian Music Awards	2019	Song of the Year	"Beautiful Pain"	Nominated	
Mnet Asian Music Awards	2019	Best Vocal Performance – Group	"Beautiful Pain"	Nominated	
Mnet Asian Music Awards	2019	Worldwide Fans' Choice Top 10	BtoB	Nominated	
MTV Best of the Best	2013	Best New Artist	BtoB	Nominated	
MTV Best of the Best	2013	Best Rookie	BtoB	Nominated	
Naver Music Awards	2017	Top 10 Most Loved Artists	BtoB	Won	
Seoul Music Awards	2013	Rookie of the Year	BtoB	Nominated	
Seoul Music Awards	2016	Popularity Award	BtoB	Nominated	
Seoul Music Awards	2016	Hallyu Special Award	BtoB	Nominated	
Seoul Music Awards	2016	Ballad Award	BtoB	Won	
Seoul Music Awards	2016	Bonsang Award	BtoB	Nominated	
Seoul Music Awards	2017	Bonsang Award	BtoB	Nominated	
Seoul Music Awards	2017	Hallyu Special Award	BtoB	Nominated	
Seoul Music Awards	2017	Popularity Award	BtoB	Nominated	
Seoul Music Awards	2018	Daesang Award	BtoB	Nominated	
Seoul Music Awards	2018	Bonsang Award	BtoB	Won	
Seoul Music Awards	2018	Hallyu Special Award	BtoB	Nominated	
Seoul Music Awards	2018	Popularity Award	BtoB	Nominated	
Seoul Music Awards	2019	Bonsang Award	BtoB	Nominated	
Seoul Music Awards	2019	Hallyu Special Award	BtoB	Nominated	
Seoul Music Awards	2019	Popularity Award	BtoB	Nominated	
Seoul Music Awards	2025	K-pop Special Award	BtoB	Won	
Seoul Music Awards	2025	Main Prize (Bonsang)	BtoB	Nominated	
Seoul Music Awards	2025	Popularity Award	BtoB	Nominated	
Seoul Music Awards	2025	K-Wave Special Award	BtoB	Nominated	
Seoul Music Awards	2025	K-pop World Choice – Group	BtoB	Nominated	
Soribada Best K-Music Awards	2017	Daesang Award	BtoB	Nominated	
Soribada Best K-Music Awards	2017	Bonsang Award	BtoB	Won	
Soribada Best K-Music Awards	2017	Popularity Award	BtoB	Nominated	
Supersound Festival	2025	Vocal Group	BtoB	Won	
V Live Awards	2019	Top 10 Artist	BtoB	Nominated	
V Live Awards	2019	Best Channel – 1 million followers	BtoB	Nominated	

== Other accolades ==
=== State and cultural honors ===
Name of country or organization, year given, and name of honor
Country or organization	Year	Honor	Ref.
South Korea (Note: Honors are given at the Korean Popular Culture and Arts Awards, arranged by the Korea Creative Content Agency and hosted by the Ministry of Culture, Sports and Tourism. They are awarded to those who have contributed to the arts and South Korea's pop culture.)	2017	Minister of Culture, Sports and Tourism Commendation	
Seoul Metropolitan Government	2018	Seoul Mayor Award	

== See also ==
- List of awards and nominations received by Seo Eunkwang
- List of awards and nominations received by Lee Minhyuk
- List of awards and nominations received by Lee Changsub
- List of awards and nominations received by Yook Sungjae
