= List of BtoB concert tours =

BtoB concert tours
- Tours: 2
- Concerts: 17
- Fan meetings: 4
- I'll Be Your Melody: 5
- Showcases: 2

South Korean boyband BtoB has performed in two concert tours, seventeen concerts and four fan meetings since debut in 2012. They have also held five special concerts, I'll Be Your Melody in conjunction with the theme of their album released each year. The concert is filled with special performances of published and unpublished songs.

== Tours ==
=== BTOB Zepp Tour 2016 B-Loved ===
==== Tour dates ====
Year	Date	City	Country	Venue	Attendance	Ref.
2016	10 January	Nagoya	Japan	Zepp Nagoya	10,000	
2016	12 February	Tokyo	Japan	Zepp DiverCity	10,000	
2016	13 February	Fukuoka	Japan	Zepp Fukuoka	10,000	
2016	14 January	Osaka	Japan	Zepp Namba	10,000	

==== Set list ====
Setlist on February 12, 2016 in Tokyo

Opening VCR

1. MAGIC Time
2. Blowin'

Ment

3. Beep Beep
4. Giddy Up

Ment

5. Way Back Home
6. It's Okay
7. Repeating Goodbye

VCR

8. Rainy Blue (Seo Eun-kwang and Yook Sung-jae)
9. A-Yo (Rap line)
10. Uptown Funk (Mark Ronson and Bruno Mars cover) (Lee Chang-sub solo ft. BTOB)

Ment

11. I'll Be Here (BtoB Blue)
12. Neverland (Rap line)

VCR ft. Dear Bride

13. Dear Bride

Ment

14. Always & Forever
15. Sky's Tears

Ment

16. WOW (Jpn. Ver.)
17. All Wolves Except Me

Ment

18. Future (Tomorrow)
19. Second Confession (Jpn Ver.)
20. Because We Can Meet Again

Encore

21. Hello
22. Shake It

=== BTOB Zepp Tour『BTOB TIME JAPAN』 ===
==== Tour dates ====
Year	Date	City	Country	Venue	Ref.
2017	1 April	Nagoya	Japan	Zepp Nagoya	
2017	2 April	Osaka	Japan	Zepp Namba	
2017	8 April	Tokyo	Japan	Zepp DiverCity	
2017	9 April	Tokyo	Japan	Zepp DiverCity	
2017	15 April	Sapporo	Japan	Zepp Sapporo	
2017	April 16	Osaka	Japan	Zepp Osaka Bayside	

==== Set list ====
Setlist on April 1–2, 8-9, 15-16, 2017 in Japan

VCR 1

1. New Men
2. Pray (I'll Be Your Man)
3. Thriller

Ment

4. MAGIC Time
5. Beep Beep

Ment

6. Cherry Blossom Color ^{[2]}^{[3]}/Remember That ^{[5]}
7. Always and Forever ^{[2]}/L.U.V. ^{[3]}/Sky's Tears ^{[4]}/ Repeating Goodbye ^{[5]}

Ment

8. About Time
9. Love Drunk ^{[2]}/Killing Me ^{[3]}^{[5]}
10. Killing Me ^{[2]}/Let's Kiss Right Here, Right Now ^{[3]}^{[5]}

VCR

11. Stand By Me (BtoB Blue)
12. Hello Mello (JPN ver.) (Rap line)

Ment

13. Future (Tomorrow)
14. Dear Bride ^{[2]}/Second Confession (JPN ver.) ^{[3]}^{[5]}

Ment

15. MOVIE ^{[2]}/Dear Bride ^{[3]}^{[5]}
16. Second Confession (JPN ver.) ^{[2]}/MOVIE ^{[3]}^{[5]}

Ment

17. Someday
18. Because We Will Meet Again

VCR 6

19. WOW (JPN ver.) ^{[2]}/All Wolves Except Me ^{[3]}^{[5]}
20. Shake It

Encore

22. Yes I Am
23. Blowin'
24. Hello ^{[5]}

^{2} Song performed on April 1–2.
^{3} Song performed on April 9.
^{4} Song performed on April 8.
^{5} Song performed on April 15–16.

== Concerts ==
=== Happy Summer Vacation with BtoB ===
Date	City	Country	Venue	Attendance	Ref.
July 19, 2014 (2 shows)	Osaka	Japan	Grand Cube Osaka	4,000	
July 21, 2014 (2 shows)	Chiba	Japan	Maihama Amphitheatre	4,000	

=== 1st concert: Hello Melody ===
Hello Melody is the first solo concert held, respectively in 2014 and 2015 in South Korea, Seoul and Busan.

==== Summary ====
On September 19, 2014, Cube Entertainment announced through its official SNS that BtoB will held its first solo concert "Hello, Melody" at the Olympic Hall in Seoul, South Korea on October 31 and November 1. Jung Il-hoon invited his sister JOO as a special guest. On March 11, 2015, Cube announced the date for "Hello Melody in Busan".

==== Set list ====
Setlist on October 31 and November 1, 2014 in Seoul

Opening VCR

1. WOW
2. Thriller

Ment

3. Beep Beep
4. Happening

VCR

5. You're So Fly

Ment

6. Broken Heart
7. Hope You're Doing Fine
8. Insane (Acoustic ver.)

VCR

9. Born To Beat (except Peniel Shin)
10. Love More + Body Shots (Chris Brown cover) (Peniel Shin dance performance)
11. Irresistible Lips (except Peniel Shin)
12. When I Was Your Man (내가 니 남자였을 때 )

Ment

13. I Don't Know (Vocal line)
14. You're My Angel (Rap line feat. JOO)

Ment

15. Love (JOO feat. Jung Il-hoon)
16. Jung Il-hoon solo piano stage
17. Do You Know Who I Am? (허타 이즈 백 Heota is Back) (Lee Min-hyuk solo)

VCR

18. Please (Lee Sora cover) (Yook Sung-jae solo)
19. Like That Day (그때 그날처럼) (Seo Eun-kwang solo)

VCR

20. Gentleman (Psy cover) (Seo Eun-kwang and Yook Sung-jae)
21. Lover Boy

Ment

VCR

22. Star
23. Never Ending (Melody) (Vocal line cover) (Rap line)

Ment

24. Hello Mello (Rap line cover) (Vocal line)
25. Shake It

Encore

26. Second Confession
27. Catch Me
28. Hello
Setlist on April 4, 2015 in Busan

Opening VCR

1. WOW
2. Thriller

Ment

3. Beep Beep
4. Happening

VCR

5. You're So Fly

Ment

6. Broken Heart
7. One Sip
8. Insane (Acoustic ver.)

VCR

9. Born To Beat (except Peniel Shin)
10. Love More + Body Shots (Chris Brown cover) (Peniel Shin dance performance)
11. Irresistible Lips
12. Lover Boy

Ment

13. I Don’t Know (Vocal line)
14. You’re My Angel (넌 나의 천사) (Rap line feat. Im Hyunsik)
15. A-yo (Lee Min-hyuk and Jung Il-hoon)
16. Uptown Funk (Mark Ronson and Bruno Mars cover) (Lee Chang-sub solo ft. BTOB)

VCR

17. Etude of Memory (Kim Dong Ryul cover) (Yook Sung-jae solo)
18. Like That Day (그때 그날처럼) (Seo Eun-kwang solo)

VCR

19. Gentlemen (Psy cover) (Seo Eun-kwang and Yook Sung-jae)
20. The Winter's Tale

VCR

21. Star
22. Never Ending (Melody) (Vocal line cover) (Rap line)

Ment

23. Hello Mello (Rap line cover) (Vocal line)
24. Shake It

Encore

25. Catch Me
26. Hello

==== Concert dates ====
Date	City	Country	Venue	Attendance	Ref.
October 31, 2014	Seoul	South Korea	Olympic Hall	3,000	
November 1, 2014	Seoul	South Korea	Olympic Hall	3,000	
Total				6,000	
April 4, 2015	Busan	South Korea	Busan KBS Hall	—N/a	

==== Media ====
Air Date	Country	Network	Ref.
Present; Every Thursday from 9:00 a.m.	Worldwide	CUBE TV	

==== Personnel ====
Organizer: Cube Entertainment
Ticketing partners: INTERPARK

=== 1st solo concert: 'The Secret Diary' ===
Date	City	Country	Venue	Attendance	Ref.
29 April 2015 (2 shows)	Tokyo	Japan	Tokyo Dome City Hall	10,000	
30 April 2015 (2 shows)	Osaka	Japan	Grand Cube Osaka	10,000	

==== Set list ====
Setlist on April 29–30, 2015 in Japan

VCR 1

1. WOW (Jpn Ver.)
2. Lover Boy
3. Insane

Ment

4. You're So Fly

VCR (Line Conversation)

5. Happening

Ment

6. Thriller
7. Irresistible Lips
8. Regrets of Love

VCR 2

9. Future (Tomorrow)

Ment + Happy Birthday Melody

10. My Girl (Piano ver.)

Ment

11. Monday to Sunday
12. Second Confession (Jpn Ver.)
13. Seo Eun-kwang Solo Stage

VCR 3

14. You're My Angel (Rap line)
15. Never Ending (Melody) (Vocal line)

VCR 4

16. Press Play
17. Stand Up
18. Why

VCR 5

19. Cherry Blossom Color
20. Star

Ment

21. MAGIC Time
22. Shake It!

Encore

23. Catch Me
24. Hello

=== BtoB 2015 Concert in Hong Kong ===
Date	City	Country	Venue	Ref.
November 27, 2015	Hong Kong	China	AsiaWorld–Expo	

==== Set list ====
Setlist on November 27, 2015 in Hong Kong

VCR

1. WOW
2. Thriller

Ment

3. Beep Beep
4. Happening

Ment

5. Insane (remix)
6. Irresistible Lips
7. It's Okay

VCR 2

8. I Don't Know (Vocal line)
9. You're My Angel (Rap line)
10. Way Back Home
11. Last Day

Ment

12. Like A Crystal
13. Second Confession

Ment

14. The Winter's Tale
15. You Can Cry

Ment

16. Giddy Up
17. Hello Mello

Ment

18. Star
19. Shake It

Encore

20. Catch Me
21. Hello

=== 2nd concert: Born to Beat Time ===
Date	City	Country	Venue	Attendance	Ref.
December 19, 2015	Seoul	South Korea	Jangchung Arena	4,000	
December 20, 2015	Seoul	South Korea	Jangchung Arena	4,000	
August 7, 2016	Taipei	Taiwan	Taipei International Convention Center	—N/a	

==== Media ====
Air Date	Country	Network	Ref.
Present; Every Saturday from 9:00 p.m.	Worldwide	CUBE TV	

==== Set list ====
Setlist on December 19–20, 2015 in Seoul

Opening VCR

1. Born To Beat
2. Thriller (Rock ver.)
3. WOW (Remix)

Ment

4. All Wolves Except Me
5. One Man Show
6. Giddy Up

Ment

7. Last Day
8. Insane (Acoustic Remix)

Live VCR

9. Free (Gavin DeGraw cover) (Im Hyunsik solo)
10. What A Friend Is (Seo Eun-kwang & Lee Chang-sub unit)
11. Right Now (Seo Eun-kwang & Lee Chang-sub unit)
12. Just Yesterday (Yook Sung-jae solo)

Ment

13. I'll Be Here (BtoB Blue)
14. A-Yo (Lee Min-hyuk & Jung Il-hoon unit)
15. The Way You Make Me Feel + Manolo (Michael Jackson and Trip Lee cover) (Peniel Shin dance performance ft. Seo Eun-kwang)
16. Neverland (Rap line ft. G.NA)

Ment ft. G.NA

17. I'll Get Lost, You Go Your Way (G.NA solo performance)
18. Black & White (G.NA solo performance)
19. Way Back Home
20. It's Okay

Ment ft. Event

21. The Winter's Tale
22. You Can Cry

Ment

23. I Miss You
24. Her Over Flowers

Ment

25. Beep Beep

Encore

VCR

26. Second Confession
27. Shake It

=== Born To Beat Time ~ Encore ===
Date	City	Country	Venue	Attendance	Ref.
March 26, 2016	Seoul	South Korea	Jamsil Arena	14,000	
March 27, 2016	Seoul	South Korea	Jamsil Arena	14,000	

==== Set list ====
Setlist on March 26–27, 2016 in Seoul

Opening VCR

1. Complete
2. Thriller (Remix)
3. WOW (Remix)

Ment

4. All Wolves Except Me
5. One Man Show
6. Giddy Up

Ment

7. Way Back Home
8. It's Okay

VCR

9. Need To Be Successful (Jung Il-hoon solo)
10. Do You Know Who I Am? (허타 이즈 백 Heota is Back) (Lee Min-hyuk solo)
11. The Way You Make Me Feel + Manolo (Michael Jackson and Trip Lee cover) (Peniel Shin dance performance ft. Seo Eun-kwang)
12. Neverland (Rap line ft. Im Hyunsik)

Ment

13. Thank You (Yook Sung-jae solo)
14. A Little Girl (Seo Eun-kwang & Lee Chang-sub unit)
15. Right Now (Seo Eun-kwang & Lee Chang-sub unit)
16. Free (Gavin DeGraw cover) (Im Hyunsik solo)
17. I'll Be Here (BtoB Blue)

VCR

18. So Pretty
19. Remember That
20. Last Day

Ment

21. I Miss You
22. Her Over Flowers
23. Beep Beep

Encore

24. Second Confession
25. Shake It

=== Born To Beat Time Concert in Taiwan ===
Date	City	Country	Venue	Attendance	Ref.
August 7, 2016	Taipei	Taiwan	Taipei International Convention Center	Unknown	

==== Set list ====
Setlist on August 7, 2016 in Taiwan

Opening VCR

1. When I Was Your Man
2. WOW
3. Thriller

Ment

4. Summer Romance
5. One Man Show
6. Giddy Up

Ment

7. Last Day
8. Killing Me

VCR

9. I'll Be Here (BtoB Blue)
10. Drink! (Rap line)

Ment

11. By Your Side

Ment ft. Flower Hyunsik pose

12. All Wolves Except Me
13. Beep Beep

VCR

14. Way Back Home
15. It's Okay

Ment

16. Remember That

Ment

17. Her Over Flowers
18. Second Confession
19. I Miss You

Ment ft. BTOB cake & Ilhoon's See You Again

20. Shake It!

Encore

21. Hello

=== 3rd concert: BtoB Time ===
BtoB Time is the third solo concert of boy band, BtoB. The concert commenced with two shows in Seoul and continued with concerts in Taiwan and Hong Kong.

==== Set list ====
Setlist on January 21–22, 2017 in Seoul

VCR 1 & Intro

1. New Men
2. Prayer (I'll Be Your Man)
3. Thriller

Ment

4. Heart Attack
5. Beep Beep

Ment

6. Live Well Yourself
7. Killing Me

VCR 2

8. Forever (Bewhy cover) (Seo Eun-kwang solo)
9. You’re Falling In To Me (No Brain cover) (Lee Chang-sub solo)
10. Fancy Shoes (Jung Il-hoon solo) ^{[A]}

Ment

11. Stand By Me (BtoB Blue)
12. Playing With Fire (Blackpink cover) (Rap line feat Changsub)

Ment

13. It's Okay
14. Second Confession

VCR 3

15. Boyfriend + Weight in Gold (Justin Bieber and Gallant cover) (Lee Min-hyuk dance performance)
16. Body Roll (Peniel Shin solo)
17. Swimming (Im Hyunsik solo) ^{[A]}

Ment

18. All Wolves Except Me
19. One Man Show

VCR 4

20. Yejiapsa (Melody Song)
21. Love Drunk
22. Come on Over

VCR 5

Encore

23. Yes I Am
24. Shake It

^{A} Performed with an unreleased song.

Setlist on May 21, 2017 in Taiwan

VCR

1. New Men
2. Prayer (I'll Be Your Man)
3. Thriller
4. Heart Attack
5. Beep Beep
6. Hope You're Doing Fine
7. It's Okay
8. Practice Love (JJ Lin cover) (Im Hyunsik solo)
9. At The End (Lee Chang-sub solo)
10. Stand By Me (BtoB Blue)
11. Hello Mello (Rap line)
12. Someday
13. About Time
14. Who Are You (Sam Kim cover) (Yook Sung-jae solo)
15. Second Confession
16. Her Over Flowers
17. All Wolves Except Me
18. Come on Over
19. Movie

Encore

20. Yes I Am
21. Shake It
Setlist on July 14, 2017 in Hong Kong

VCR

1. New Men
2. Prayer (I'll Be Your Man)
3. Thriller
4. Beep Beep
5. Live Well Yourself
6. It's Okay
7. Practice Love (JJ Lin cover) (Im Hyunsik solo)
8. That Girl (Peniel Shin solo)
9. Stand By Me (BtoB Blue)
10. Someday
11. About Time
12. Who Are You (Sam Kim cover) (Yook Sung-jae solo)
13. Second Confession
14. WOW
15. Come on Over
16. Movie

Encore

17. Yes I Am
18. Shake It

==== Concert dates ====
Date	City	Country	Venue	Ref.
January 21, 2017	Seoul	South Korea	SK Olympic Handball Gymnasium	
January 22, 2017	Seoul	South Korea	SK Olympic Handball Gymnasium	
May 21, 2017	Taipei	Taiwan	Taipei International Convention Center	
July 14, 2017	Hong Kong	China	AsiaWorld–Expo	

==== Media ====
Air Date	Country	Network	Ref.
Present; Every Saturday from 2:30 p.m.	Worldwide	CUBE TV	

==== Personnel ====
Organizers: Cube Entertainment, Asscott Media (Taiwan), K Contents Hub Co. Limited. (Hong Kong)
Ticketing partners: Hanatour (Seoul), KKTIX (Taiwan), HK Ticketing (Hong Kong)

=== 4th concert: BtoB Time – Our Concert ===
==== Set list ====
Setlist on December 23–24, 2017 in Seoul

VCR 1

1. Just Say It (말만해)
2. Movie

Ment

3. Guitar (Stroke of Love)
4. Pray (I'll Be Your Man)

Ment

5. Running into Breakup (이별을 만나다)
6. Someday (언젠가)

VCR 2

7. Cry Me A River (Justin Timberlake cover) (Yook Sung-jae solo)
8. Feeling Good (Michael Bublé cover) (Im Hyunsik solo)
9. Miss You (Lee Chang-sub solo) ^{[A]}

Ment

10. Last Christmas
11. You Can Cry
12. The Winter's Tale (울면안돼)

VCR 3 (Never Ending Melody)

13. Gashina (Sunmi cover) (Seo Eun-kwang solo)
14. She's Gone (Jung Il-hoon solo) ^{[A]}

VCR 4

15. That Girl (Peniel Shin solo)
16. I Have Something To Say (할말이 있어) (Lee Min-hyuk solo) ^{[A]}

Ment

VCR 5

17. Na Na Na (나나나)
18. Second Confession
19. It's Okay (괜찮아요)

VCR 6

20. All Wolves Except Me (나빼고 다 늑대)
21. Blowin' Up

Ment

22. My Lady
23. Missing You

Encore

24. Star
25. Shake It
26. Finale: Our Concert (우리들의 콘서트)

^{A} Performed with an unreleased song.

Setlist on February 24, 2018 in Busan

VCR 1

1. Just Say It (말만해)
2. Movie

Ment

3. Guitar (Stroke of Love)
4. Pray (I'll Be Your Man)

Ment

5. Running into Breakup (이별을 만나다)
6. Someday (언젠가)

VCR 2

7. Tell Me (Yook Sung-jae solo)
8. Feeling Good (Michael Bublé cover) (Im Hyunsik solo)
9. Miss You (Lee Chang-sub solo) ^{[A]}

Ment

10. Last Christmas
11. You Can Cry
12. The Winter's Tale (울면안돼)

VCR 3 (Never Ending Melody)

13. Gashina (Sunmi cover) (Seo Eun-kwang solo)
14. She's Gone (Jung Il-hoon solo) ^{[A]}

VCR 4

1. That Girl (Peniel Shin solo)
2. I Have Something To Say (할말이 있어) (Lee Min-hyuk solo) ^{[A]}

Ment

VCR 5

17. Dreaming
18. Second Confession
19. It's Okay (괜찮아요)

VCR 6

20. All Wolves Except Me (나빼고 다 늑대)
21. Blowin' Up

Ment

22. My Lady
23. Missing You

Encore

24. Yejiapsa (Melody Song)
25. Shake It
26. Finale: Our Concert (우리들의 콘서트)

^{A} Performed with an unreleased song.

==== Concert dates ====
Date	City	Country	Venue	Ref.
December 23, 2017	Ilsan	South Korea	Ilsan KINTEX Exhibition Hall	
December 24, 2017	Ilsan	South Korea	Ilsan KINTEX Exhibition Hall	
February 24, 2018	Busan	South Korea	Busan Exhibition and Convention Center	

==== Media ====
Air Date	Country	Network	Ref.
January 20, 2018–present Every Saturday from 1:30 p.m.	Worldwide	CUBE TV	

=== 5th Concert: BtoB Time – This Is Us ===
==== Set list ====
Setlist on August 10–12, 2018 in Seoul

VCR 1

1. The Feeling
2. Movie
3. Blue Moon

Ment

4. Someday
5. Killing Me

Ment

6. Call Me
7. Yeah

VCR 2

8. A Song for You (Donny Hathaway cover) ^{[A]}/ Free (Gavin DeGraw cover) ^{[B]}^{[C]}(Im Hyunsik solo)
9. Hypnotized (Yook Sung-jae ft. Peniel Shin) ^{[D]}

VCR 3

10. At The End (Lee Chang-sub solo)
11. Big Wave (Jung Il-hoon solo)
12. All Day (Korean ver.) (Lee Min-hyuk solo)

VCR 4 + VCR debut stage

13. Imagine
14. When It Rains (비가 내리면) (BtoB Blue)
15. Ice Breaker (Rap line)

VCR 5

16. Letter of A Private (이등병의 편지) (Kim Kwang Seok cover) (Seo Eun-kwang solo)

Ment

17. Guitar (Stroke of Love)
18. Pray (I'll Be Your Man)

VCR 6

19. It's Okay
20. Only One For Me

Ment

21. Shake It ^{[C]}

Encore

22. Missing You
23. Finale: Our Concert ^{[A]} / Shake It ^{[B]}
24. Shake It ^{[A]} / Finale: Our Concert ^{[B]} / Way Back Home ^{[C]}

^{A} Song performed on August 10.
^{B} Song performed on August 11.
^{C} Song performed on August 12.
^{D} Performed with an unreleased song.

Setlist on September 8, 2018 in Taiwan and September 21, 2018 in Jakarta

VCR

1. The Feeling
2. Movie

Ment

3. Someday

Ment

4. Call Me
5. Yeah

Ment

6. Every Day, Every Moment (Paul Kim cover) (Seo Eun-kwang solo) (in VCR)
7. All Day (Korean ver.) (Lee Min-hyuk solo)
8. Hypnotized (Yook Sung-jae ft. Peniel Shin) ^{[A]}
9. Big Wave (Jung Il-hoon solo)

Ment

10. When It Rains (비가 내리면) (BtoB Blue)
11. Ice Breaker (Rap line)

Ment

12. It's Okay
13. Summer Romance

Ment

14. All Wolves Except Me (나빼고 다 늑대)
15. Blowin' Up
16. Only One For Me

Encore

17. Missing You
18. Finale: Our Concert

^{A} Performed with an unreleased song.

Setlist on October 14, 2018 in Bangkok

VCR 1

1. The Feeling
2. Movie

Ment

3. Last Day

Ment

4. Call Me
5. Yeah

Ment

6. Every Day, Every Moment (Paul Kim cover) (Seo Eun-kwang solo) (in VCR)
7. When I Hold You (Im Hyunsik solo)
8. At The End (Lee Chang-sub solo)
9. All Day (Korean ver.) (Lee Min-hyuk solo)
10. Hypnotized (Yook Sung-jae ft. Peniel Shin) ^{[1]}

Ment

11. When It Rains (비가 내리면) (BtoB Blue)
12. Ice Breaker (Rap line)

Ment

13. It's Okay
14. Na Na Na

Ment

15. All Wolves Except Me
16. Blowin' Up
17. Only One For Me

Encore

18. Missing You
19. Finale: Our Concert

^{1} Performed with an unreleased song.

==== Concert dates ====
Date	City	Country	Venue	Ref.
August 10, 2018	Seoul	South Korea	KSPO DOME	
August 11, 2018	Seoul	South Korea	KSPO DOME	
August 12, 2018	Seoul	South Korea	KSPO DOME	
September 8, 2018	New Taipei City	Taiwan	Hsing Chuang Gymnasium	
September 21, 2018	Jakarta	Indonesia	The Kasablanka	
October 14, 2018	Bangkok	Thailand	Chaengwattana Hall	

==== Media ====
Air Date	Country	Network	Ref.
August 12, 2018	Available outside of Korea	CUBE TV Hangtime app	
Present; Every Monday on 9:00 pm	Worldwide	CUBE TV	

=== BtoB 4U Online Concert: INSIDE ===
==== Set list ====
Setlist on January 23, 2021

Opening VCR

1. Show Your Love

Ment

2. Only One For Me
3. Blue Moon

VCR

4. Have A Nice Day (Seo Eun-kwang cover) (Lee Chang-sub solo)
5. At The End (Lee Chang-sub cover) (Seo Eun-kwang solo)

Ment

6. Nangman Oppa (Seo Eun-kwang & Lee Chang-sub)

VCR

7. Mirage
8. Tension

Ment

9. Sorry (Seo Eun-kwang, Lee Chang-sub & Lee Min-hyuk)
10. Beautiful Pain

VCR

11. Hutazone (Lee Min-hyuk solo)
12. Ya (Lee Min-hyuk solo)
13. Valentine (Peniel Shin solo)
14. Mermaid (Lee Min-hyuk & Peniel Shin)
15. Ice Breaker (Lee Min-hyuk & Peniel Shin)

Ment

16. My House (2PM cover)
17. Bull's Eye

Ment

18. Missing You

Encore

19. Alone

Ment

20. Finale: Our Concert

Date	City	Country	Venue	Ref.
January 23, 2021	Seoul	South Korea	Online	

=== 6th Concert: 2022 BTOB Time – Be Together (BTOB 10th Anniversary Concert) ===
==== Set list ====
Setlist on December 30–31, 2022 and January 1, 2023 in Seoul

VCR 1

1. Finale : Our Concert
2. Finale (Show and Prove)

Ment

3. Whiskey
4. Dance with Me
5. Higher

VCR 2

6. That Man (Hyun Bin cover) (Seo Eun-kwang solo)
7. Come with the Wind (Christmas ver.) (Yook Sung-jae solo)
8. Fly23 (Peniel Shin solo)

Girl group dance medley

9. Love Dive (Ive cover) (Seo Eun-kwang dance solo)
10. Antifragile (Le Sserafim cover) (Lee Min-hyuk dance solo)
11. Hype Boy (NewJeans cover) (Seo Eun-kwang, Lee Min-hyuk, Yook Sung-jae unit)

Ment

12. Dear Love (Im Hyunsik solo)
13. Shelter (Lee Chang-sub solo)
14. Boom (Lee Min-hyuk solo)
15. Tonight (With Melody) (Lee Min-hyuk solo)

Ment

16. Blooming Day ^{[a]}^{[b]} / Be Together ^{[c]}
17. It's Okay

VCR 3

18. Second Confession
19. WOW
20. Pray (I'll be your man)

Ment

21. Beautiful Pain
22. Only One For Me

Ment

23. Missing You

Encore

VCR 4

24. The Song

Ment

25. Outro: Encore
26. Shake It ^{[a]} / Dreamer ^{[b]} / Someday ^{[c]}
27. Yes I Am ^{[c]}

^{a} Song performed on December 30.
^{b} Song performed on December 31.
^{c} Song performed on January 1.

Date	City	Country	Venue	Ref.
December 30, 2022	Seoul	South Korea	KSPO DOME	
December 31, 2022	Seoul	South Korea	KSPO DOME	
January 1, 2023	Seoul	South Korea	KSPO DOME	

== Special concerts ==
Concert	Date	City	Country	Venue	Ref.
BtoB Special Live "Born To Make You Happy!!!"	May 17, 2014	Chiba	Japan	Maihama Amphitheater	
BtoB Special Live "Born To Make You Happy!!!"	May 18, 2014	Chiba	Japan	Maihama Amphitheater	
BtoB Special Live In Japan ~ Happy Summer	August 13, 2015	Osaka	Japan	Grand Cube Osaka	
BtoB Special Live In Japan ~ Happy Summer	August 14, 2015	Osaka	Japan	Grand Cube Osaka	
BtoB Christmas Special Live Concert	November 29, 2015	Osaka	Japan	Grand Cube Osaka	
BtoB Special Concert「L.U.V	June 11, 2016	Tokyo	Japan	Meets Port	
BtoB Special Concert「L.U.V	June 19, 2016	Hyogo	Japan	Kobe Portopia hotel	
BtoB Special Concert "Christmas Time!"	December 4, 2016	Osaka	Japan	Grand Cube Osaka	
BtoB Special Concert "Christmas Time!"	December 9, 2016	Tokyo	Japan	Meets Port	
BtoB Special Concert "2017 Summer Spark Party!!"	August 19, 2017	Chiba	Japan	Maihama Amphitheatre	
BtoB Special Concert "2017 Summer Spark Party!!"	August 20, 2017	Chiba	Japan	Maihama Amphitheatre	
BtoB Special Concert "2017 Summer Spark Party!!"	August 26, 2017	Osaka	Japan	Zepp Namba	
BtoB Special Concert "2017 Summer Spark Party!!"	August 27, 2017	Osaka	Japan	Zepp Namba	

=== I'll Be Your Melody ===
Date	Theme	City	Country	Venue
January 18, 2015	Be Your Melody (Note: BtoB 1st Studio Album Complete event) Set list: 1. Drink it! (Rap unit); 2. Butterfly Grave (Take cover) (Vocal unit); 3. All of Me (John Legend cover) (Hyunsik solo); 4. Wash Away (Geeks cover) (Sungjae feat. Minhyuk); 5. If I Die Tomorrow (Ilhoon solo); 6. Family photo (Kim Jin-ho cover) (Eunkwang solo); 7. Doll; 8. Three or five nights of the bright month / (Changsub solo); 9. One Candle (g.o.d cover); 10. End / Star (original singer: Zheng Junri); 11. Player (Changsub solo) (original singer: Huixing); 12. Nothin' on You (B.o.B.) (Peniel feat. Eunkwang and Changsub)	Seoul	South Korea	KT&G Sangsangmadang Daechi Art Hall
April 30, 2016	You and Me, Memories of Spring (Note: BtoB 8th EP Remember that event.) Set list: 1. Baby You (Eunkwang solo); 2. Tears (Lena Park cover) (Changsub solo); 3. No Matter Where (MC the Max cover) (Changsub solo); 4. Listening? (Swings) (Hyunsik solo); 5. For You (Yim Jae-beom cover) (Hyunsik solo); 6. Mixtape (Peniel); 7. To My Bride 신부에게 (Yurisangja cover) (Vocal unit); 8. Beautiful prod. by (Ilhoon (Ilhoon solo); 9. It's Ok; 10. Killing Me; 11. Vacant Location	Seoul	South Korea	Yes24 Live Hall
May 7, 2017	Like A Movie (Note: BtoB 10th EP Feel'eM event.) Set list: 1. Someday; 2. An Old Song (오래된 노래) (Standing Egg cover) (Sungjae; 3. At The End (Changsub solo); 4. Missing You (Minhyuk solo); 5. Drawing; 6. Repeated Goodbye (サヨナラを缲り回して); 7. Let's Talk (Hyunsik ft Ilhoon); 8. About 30 Years Old (Kim Kwang-seok cover) (Eunkwang solo); 9. About Time; 10. MOVIE; 11. Hello Mello	Seoul	South Korea	Yes24 Live Hall
March 1, 2018	Missing Melody (Note: BtoB 2nd Studio Album Brother Act. event.) Set list: 1. Remember That; 2. Open; 3. MOVIE; 4. At That Time (Eunkwang solo); 5. Amazing You (그대라는 사치)) (Han Dong Geun cover) (Changsub solo); 6. Always (Ilhoon solo); 7. Dream; 8. Fly Away; 9. Tell Me (Sungjae; 10. Purple Rain (Minhyuk feat. CHEEZE; 11. Missing You; 12. Finale: Our concert	Seoul	South Korea	Yes24 Live Hall
September 1, 2018	Can't Live Without Melody (Note: BtoB 11th EP This Is Us event.) Set list: 1. Missing You; 2. MOVIE; 3. One Day (Eunkwang cover) (Changsub solo); 4. .. ( gradually); 5. (Hyunsik solo); 6. Every day, Every Moment (Paul Kim cover) (Eunkwang solo); 7. Valentine (Peniel); 8. Childish prod. by Minhyuk (Minhyuk solo); 9. Big Wave (Ilhoon solo); 10. Hello Mello (Rap unit); 11. When It Rains (BtoB Blue); 12. The Feeling; 13. Only One For Me	Seoul	South Korea	Yes24 Live Hall

== Concert participations ==
- 2013 United Cube Concert : Nanjing, China (January 26), Seoul, South Korea (February 2), and Yokohama, Japan (February 21)
- Boys To Man (29 June 2013)
- BesTV Channel-M Cube Festival (30 September 2015)
- United Cube Concert – One (16 June 2018)
- U & Cube Festival 2019 in Japan (23 March 2019)

== Showcases ==
Year	Date	City	Country	Venue	Showcase	Attendance	Ref.
2012	March 21	Seoul	South Korea		The Grand Launching Show	—N/a	
2012	June 21	Jakarta	Indonesia	Grand Ballrom Mandarin Oriental	BtoB Live in Jakarta 2012	500	
2014	November 11	Tokyo	Japan	Nicofarre	BTOB Japan Debut Showcase [WOW!]	1000	
2015	August 17	Tokyo	Japan	Nicofarre	BTOB Japan Showcase [Summer Color My Girl]	1000	—N/a

== Others ==
Year	Date	Event	City	Country	Venue	Ref.
2012	May 23	Born To Beat Autograph Session in Singapore	Singapore		Bugis Junction	
2015	December 12	BtoB Special Christmas Live in Tokyo	Tokyo	Japan		
2015	December 25	Sparkling Christmas with BtoB	Medan	Indonesia	Mikie Holiday Funland and Holiday Resort	
2015	December 26	Sparkling Christmas with BtoB	Medan	Indonesia	Mikie Holiday Funland and Holiday Resort	
2016	May 1	BtoB Request Awards "BtoB Best20 Melody” Set list: 1. You're So Fly; 2. Blowin'; 3. U＆I; 4. Future (未来(あした)); 5. Happening; 6. Monday to Sunday; 7. Star; 8. BEEP BEEP; 9. Magic Time; 10. Dear Bride; 11. Shake It; 12. 夏色MY GIRL; 13. My Girl; 14. Irresistible Lips; 15. さよならを繰り返して; 16. Insane; 17. I Only Know Love; 18. It's Okey; 19. WOW; 20. 2nd Confession; 21. Thriller; 22. Dear Bride; 23. Hello	Osaka	Japan	Zepp Osaka	
2017	August 13	2017 BtoB Request Awards in Osaka "BtoB Best20 Melody” Set list: 1. It's Okay; 2. MOVIE (Korea & Japanese ver.); 3. I'll Be Your Man; 4. Someday (Korea & Japanese ver.); 5. Remember That; 6. Thriller; 7. 2nd Confession (Korea & Japanese ver.); 8. 夏色MY GIRL; 9. Insane; 10. I Only Know Love; 11. WOW (Korea & Japanese ver.); 12. My Girl; 13. Dear Bride; 14. L.U.V; 15. Star; 16. Killing Me; 17. Melody; 18. All Wolves Except Me	Osaka	Japan	Zepp Osaka	
