= 4U: Outside =

- Digital and streaming cover

EP by BtoB
- Released: August 30, 2021
- Recorded: 2021
- Length: 22:08
- Languages: Korean; English
- Labels: Cube; Kakao

BtoB chronology
Piece of BTOB (2019)	4U: Outside (2021)	Outsider (2021)

Physical edition cover
- Silent and Awake versions, left to right

Singles from 4U: Outside
- 1. "Finale (Show and Prove)" Released: May 28, 2021; 2. "Outsider" Released: August 30, 2021

4U: Outside is an extended play by South Korean boy group BtoB released on August 30, 2021, through Cube Entertainment, marketed as a special release. The album is the group's second release without members Sungjae and Hyunsik, who were completing their mandatory military service at the time of the release. The EP consists of six tracks, including the pre-released single "Show and Prove" and the lead single "Outsider". The physical version is available in two versions: "Silent" and "Awake".

== Background ==
On August 12, Cube officially announced their comeback with the released artwork teaser image of the special album 4U: Outside through their official social network service. The teaser contains the album name and release date. This is the first time in about 9 months since the mini-album Inside released in November 2020.

== Artwork and packaging ==
BtoB released two album versions for the EP: Silent and Awake version. The EP has a book cover, book package, booklet, lyric paper, CD, invitation card, postcard, photo card, film photo card and poster which is only available for pre-order.

== Promotion ==
On August 16, 2021, Cube released a time table for BtoB's special album through their official homepage and SNS, which shows the group's promotion schedule beginning August 17 until the release of their album on August 31. It included track list, concept photos, audio snippet, and a teaser of the upcoming music video for the title track "Outsider". The EP will be released digitally on August 30, and physically the following day.

To commemorate the release of the album, the global entertainment platform Makestar, Dearmymuse, kTown4U, and Apple Music, opened the one-on-one video call event page.

== Track listing ==
4U: Outside track listing
No.	Title	Lyrics	Music	Arrangement	Length
1.	"Dreamer"	Minhyuk (Huta); Peniel	Aftrshok; Minhyuk (Huta); joseph k	Aftrshok; joseph k	3:33
2.	"Outsider"	Minhyuk (Huta); Peniel	Ryan S. Jhun; Cameron Warren; Max Cooke; Shaun Smith	Ryan S. Jhun; Cameron Warren	3:32
3.	"Can't Breathe" (미치고 싶어)	Minhyuk (Huta); Peniel	Aftrshok; Minhyuk (Huta); Brian U; MarkAlong	Aftrshok	3:49
4.	"Traveler" (여행)	Jinri (Full8loom); Minhyuk (Huta); Peniel	Glory Face (Full8loom); Jinri (Full8loom); Harry (Full8loom)	Glory Face (Full8loom); Harry (Full8loom)	3:23
5.	"Waiting 4 U"	Hyunsik; Lee Jae-in (Zaystin); Minhyuk (Huta); Peniel	Hyunsik; Lee Jae-in (Zaystin)	Hyunsik; Lee Jae-in (Zaystin)	3:52
6.	"Finale (Show and Prove)" (피날레 (Show and Prove))	Minhyuk (Huta); Peniel	Minhyuk (Huta); Aftrshok; joseph k; The Muze	Aftrshok; joseph k	3:59
Total length:					22:08

== Charts ==
Chart performance for 4U: Outside
Chart (2021)	Peak position
Japan Hot Albums (Billboard Japan)	37
Japanese Albums (Oricon)	21
South Korean Albums (Gaon)	2

== Release history ==
Release dates and formats for 4U: Outside
Region	Date	Format	Label
Various	August 30, 2021	Download; streaming	Cube; Kakao M; U-Cube
Various	August 31, 2021	CD	Cube; Kakao M; U-Cube
