= Yook O'Clock =

EP by Yook Sung-jae
- Released: March 2, 2020
- Genre: K-pop
- Language: Korean
- Label: Cube

Yook Sung-jae chronology
3x2=6 (2019–2020)	Yook O'Clock (2020)	Exhibition: Look Closely (2024)

Singles from Yook O'Clock
- 1. "Yook" Released: December 29, 2019; 2. "W.A.U (What About U)" Released: January 16, 2020; 3. "HMHN" Released: February 6, 2020; 4. "Come with the Wind" Released: March 2, 2020

Yook O'Clock is the debut extended play by South Korean singer Yook Sung-jae. It was released by Cube Entertainment and distributed by Kakao M on March 2, 2020. The EP consists of the lead single "Come with the Wind" and all six tracks from the singer's preceding digital single project series, 3x2=6. An accompanying animated music video for the lead single was uploaded to BtoB's YouTube channel.

== Background ==
Sungjae shared in an interview with Singles magazine that he couldn't show something musically in 2019 and hoped to have a chance to reinforce the plans he wanted to fulfil in 2019 and complete them in 2020. The number '6' is inseparable from this album, and representative of all the personalities of Yook. According to the company, Sungjae demonstrated a strong will to communicate with his fans with his music despite his tight schedule. The album is to repay the steady love sent from his fans during the 3x2=6 project, which spanned three months between December 2019 and February 2020. Through the 3x2=6 project, Sungjae showed his warm tone, pleasant personality, and strong friendship with BtoB members, he will give a new look through the EP's lead single, "Come with the Wind".

=== 3x2=6 ===
3x2=6 was a digital single project consisting of three themes; Singer, Human and BtoB. The project series featured two tracks per month for 3 months, the number '6' is a pun reference to Yook's family name which can be translated to "6" in Korean. "YOOK" and "From Winter" was released as Part 1 of the project on December 26, 2019 with the theme 'Singer-Yook'. In Part 1, the singer wanted to demonstrate his vocal skills as well as his writing and composing skills. "W.A.U" (What About U) and "Chicken" was released as Part 2 on January 16, 2020, with the theme of 'Human-Yook'. The project concluded with Part 3 consisting of "HMHN" and "Hypnotized" on February 6, 2020 with the theme 'BtoB-Yook'. Both songs in Part 3 are duets with the singer's bandmates, Ilhoon and Peniel, respectively. The latter song was initially performed at BtoB's This is Us concert in Seoul. 3x2=6 consisted of six songs altogether.

== Music and composition ==
The opening track of the album, is the lead single "Winds of the Day" is a song written, composed and arranged by MosPick. It's a song with an acoustic sound and a story that recalls the past through the blowing wind. It also contains the wish of singer Yook who wants to remain forever in the memory of music fans and the public.

"HMHN with Jung Il-hoon" meaning the determination not to say even if there are a lot to say. The single marks the first official collaboration track between Sungjae and Ilhoon.

Another collaboration song "Hypnotized", with member Peniel Shin. Together they took part in composing and writing the song. It was first performed live at 2018 BtoB Time - This Is Us concert in 2018. The song was released due to the requests by fans for releasing the track after the concert.

"WAU" (abbreviation of: What About U) is an EDM pop describing the mood after a breakup.

"Chicken" is described as cheerful and pleasant beat with high piano and groovy bass sound. The lyrics likens Sungjae to a chicken, expressing Sungjae's hopes that even if time passes, he will still be loved by the public for a long time, much like chicken.

"Yook" is described as a melodic modern rock genre with lyrical ballad songs.

"From Winter" is a ballad song with the lyrical and heartrending piano play giving a dreamlike and warm vibe.

== Release ==
On February 18, Cube announced the Sungjae would be releasing his first solo special album titled Yook O'Clock on March 2. On February 18, the release timeline of the album was revealed. On February 19, the track list of the album was revealed. The concept images were released between February 20 and 23. A prologue teaser was released on February 25. The video showed the upbringing title of "Come with the Wind" and contains the narration of "She meets you along the day's wind with the appearance of Sungjae. The following day, an audio teaser for the lead single was released. It contains a part of the song with illustrations of Yook and his pet snow bengal cat, Sami, going about their daily lives. Music video teasers for "Come with the Wind" were released on February 27 and 28, and the full music video on March 2.

The EP was released as a physical album and digitally through several digital music platforms, including MelOn, iTunes, and Spotify.

== Music video ==
Animated lyric videos were produced for all songs on the Yook O'Clock special album, initially as part of the 3x2=6 digital single project.

For "Yook", the video depicts a man who is sitting on a bench on a snowy winter night or looking out the window of snow falling in thought, along with sad lyrics. Part 3 title song "HMHN (With Jung Il-hoon)" lyric video has a figure of a person in deep thought as an illustration with the lyrics of a complicated and calm mind. While "Hypnotized (With Peniel)" contains the lyrics that can't escape from control and bondage like a hypnotized person against the backdrop of a person who walks on the street one night after breathing.

An accompanying animated music video for "Come With The Wind" was uploaded to BtoB's official YouTube channel on March 2, 2020. The video illustrated Yook, BtoB, Yook's cat Sami, and fandom Melody. It starts as he spends his day off as he pleases until the breeze brings him back to memories of a former love, Melody. He keeps seeing her different places he goes, even in the audience when he is performing for his fans. The music video ends with the real-life Yook hanging up a picture of his group on the wall.

On March 4, 2020, a lyric video for the song was released on YouTube.

== Critical reception ==
Writing for Newsen, Hwang Hye-jin had allegedly praised the quality of the six tracks released as a project single which was no less than the lead single of the Extended Play and further stated "it fully completes a well-done album".

According to Yes24, the album took the second place on the charts for the first week of March 2020.

== Track listing ==
Yook O'Clock track listing
No.	Title	Lyrics	Music	Arrangement	Length
1.	"Come with the Wind" (그날의 바람)	MosPick	MosPick	MosPick	3:38
2.	"HMHN" (할많하않) (with Jung Il-hoon)	Jung Il-hoon	Jung Il-hoon; Fuxxy; Vincenzo; Amy Masingga	Fuxxy	3:29
3.	"Hypnotized" (with Peniel Shin)	Peniel; Yook Sung-jae; Vincenzo	Peniel; Yook Sung-jae; Vincenzo	Vincenzo	4:10
4.	"W.A.U" (What About U)	Park Woo-sang	Park Woo-sang	Park Woo-sang; Young	2:58
5.	"Chicken"	Jun Sik-k	Jun Sik-k	Jun Sik-k	3:00
6.	"Yook" (뭍(陸))	Yook Sung-jae; Amy Masingga; Fuxxy	Yook Sung-jae; Amy Masingga; Fuxxy	Amy Masingga; VINCENZO	3:55
7.	"From Winter" (겨울 속에서)	On-Gyeol (153/Joombas)	MoonKim (153/Joombas); KYUM LYK (153/Joombas)	KYUM LYK (153/Joombas)	4:05
Total length:					25:00

== Credits and personnel ==
- Yook Sung-jae – all vocals, composer (track 3, 6), songwriting (track 3, 6)
- Simon Hong – producer
- MosPick – composer (track 1), songwriting (track 1), arranger (track 1)
- Amy Massingga – composer (track 2, 6), songwriting (track 6)
- Jung Il-hoon – composer (track 2), songwriting (track 2)
- Fuxxy – composer (track 2, 6), songwriting (track 6), arranger (track 2)
- VINCENZO – composer (track 2, 3), songwriting (track 3), arranger (track 3, 6)
- Peniel Shin – composer (track 3), songwriting (track 3)
- Park Woo-sang – composer (track 4), songwriting (track 4), arranger (track 4)
- Young – arranger (track 4)
- Jun Sik-k – composer (track 5), songwriting (track 5), arranger (track 5)
- MoonKim (153/Joombas) – composer (track 7), songwriting (track 7)
- KYUM LYK (153/Joombas) – composer (track), arranger (track 7)
- On-Gyeol (153/Joombas) – songwriting (track 7)

== Charts ==
Chart performance for Yook O'Clock
Chart (2020)	Peak position
South Korean Albums (Gaon)	3

== Release history ==
Release formats for Yook O'Clock
Region	Date	Format	Label
South Korea	March 2, 2020	CD; digital download; streaming	Cube Entertainment; Kakao M; U-Cube
Various	March 2, 2020	Digital download; streaming	Cube Entertainment; Kakao M; U-Cube
