= Blue Moon (BtoB song) =

2019 song by BtoB

- Digital and streaming cover

Single by BtoB

from the album This Is Us
- Released: June 18, 2018
- Genre: Funky jazz; Bebop
- Length: 4:01 (Original ver.): 4:24 (Cinema Ver.)
- Label: Cube
- Songwriters: Minhyuk; Peniel; Ilhoon
- Producers: Minhyuk; Yang Seunguk; Yun Gukhyeong

BtoB singles chronology
"Finale (Show and Prove)" (2021)	"Blue Moon" (2018)

Audio video
- "Blue Moon (Cinema Ver.) on YouTube

"Blue Moon" is a song recorded by South Korean boy group BtoB, for their eleventh extended play, This Is Us (2018), which was released on June 18, 2018 by Cube Entertainment. As the fourth track on the album, it was written by Minhyuk, Peniel and Ilhoon, and was produced by Minhyuk, Yang Seunguk and Yun Gukhyeong.

"Blue Moon (Cinema Ver.)" is an alternative version of the song for survival show, Kingdom: Legendary War which was released on June 13, 2021. This song was selected as the most wanted stage by fans in the show.

== Background and release ==
On May 26, 2021, Mnet' released a 45-second teaser of the second part of the third round, No Limit stage, between BtoB and SF9. In the video released, BtoB was seen in the recording studio discussing their next concept, Eunkwang suggests a stage inspired by a jazz bar. Changsub explains that his military seniors all play instruments and says recruit them to be the group’s live band. On the day of the broadcast, May 27, Max Changmin revealed that Btob is the third team in the 3rd round and had chosen their song that had never been performed on air. Minhyuk had a difficult time choosing songs, saying, "It gives us complete freedom, so the scope of what we can do is limitless." Changsub suggested, "It is our strength that the range that we can do is limitless or no limit, so let's do what Melody wants to hear." Eunkwang said, "There is a place I want to see the most in the kingdom," and said that we should do 'Blue Moon'.

On June 11, Cube Entertainment released the artwork image of the digital single "Blue Moon (Cinema Ver.)" across all the group's social media accounts. The released artwork shows a man and a woman holding hands and dancing under the neon 'Blue Moon', creating an atmosphere like a poster for a musical movie. The song was released to carry on the deep impression and lingering impression shown in the show.

The song was released digitally on June 13, 2021, through several music portals, including Melon, Apple Music, and Spotify.

== Music ==
The original version of "Blue Moon" is composed in the key of A minor, 100 beats per minute with a running time of 4:01 minutes. For "Blue Moon (Cinema Version)", the song is composed in the key of C♯ minor, 100 beats per minute with a running time of 4:24 minutes. It has a deeper jazz feel than the original song, ranging from Broadway-style big band swings to funky jazz and bebop jazz.

== Critical reception ==
Han Soo-jin, writing for IZE magazine praised BtoB for their 10 years existence in the industry and their message of hope to their short-lived colleagues. She also wrote about "Blue Moon" performance, "As seen in a musical, it showed a stage of determination that was different from before with a spectacular stage use and dramatic narrative. Those who seemed to be competing only with vocals made them realize the potential of their 10th year with a challenging aspect that felt catharsis of novelty while saving their organs. In an interview dated on June 11, Kingdom's main director Lee Young-joo PD chose "Blue Moon" stage as one of the most memorable stages: "It was a stage that showed BtoB's great determination to prepare a competition with a non-famous B-side song in the competition program, and showed a witty performance with the La La Land concept. And it was a performance that was dedicated to Melodys who supported BtoB, that left a deep impression.

== Live performance ==
On the 9th episode of Kingdom: Legendary War, the group performed "Blue Moon (Cinema Version)" for the first time with (G)I-dle's Miyeon as a hidden card to help BtoB's No Limit stage. The stage was presented as a musical movie-like stage with the concept of the movie La La Land and Once Upon a Time in Hollywood with Peniel's piano performance and Miyeon's role caught in a love storyline between Minhyuk and Changsub.

After the stage, they received praises from contestants saying, "What can't these hyungs do?", "It's really cool." and "It was a stage with a perfect texture." iKon's Bobby commented, "I didn't reveal it, but it's fatal to be this sexy. If it were a woman, I'd already had a love letter." What can't these hyungs do?" and "It's really cool." BtoB placed third in the round with cumulative points of 3,314.303, behind SF9 and Stray Kids.

== Track listing ==
- This Is Us
4. "Blue Moon" – 4:01
- Digital single
1. "Blue Moon (Cinema Version)" – 4:24

== Credits and personnel ==
=== Cinema version ===
Credits are adapted from Melon.

- BtoB
  - Minhyuk (HUTA) – Composing, songwriting
  - Peniel – Songwriting
  - Ilhoon – Songwriting
- AFTRSHOK – Composing, audio engineer
- Joseph K– Composing
- GEIST WAY – audio engineer, keyboard
- Byeon Jang-mun – Background vocal
- Ahn Byung-beom – Drum
- Kim Ki-seong – Bass
- Ken Song – Guitar
- Kim Yu-mi – Piano
- Choi Ye-ji (Cube Studio) – Record engineering
- Kim Seong-ryeol (Cube Studio) – Record engineering
- Jeong Yura – Digital editor
- Mr. Cho (JoeLab) – Audio mixing
- Kwon Nam-woo (821 Sound mastering) – Audio mastering
- Jang Seung-ho (821 Sound mastering) – Assistant audio mastering

== Charts ==
=== Original version ===
Chart (2018)	Peak position
South Korea (Gaon)	62
South Korea (Gaon Download)	7

=== Cinema version ===
Chart (2021)	Peak position
South Korea (Gaon Download)	38

== Release history ==
Region	Date	Format	Version	Distributor
Various	June 18, 2018	Digital download; streaming	Original	Cube; Kakao M
Various	June 13, 2021	Digital download; streaming	Cinema	Cube; Kakao M
