= Rendez-vous (EP) =

EP by Im Hyun-sik
- Released: October 14, 2019
- Genre: K-pop
- Language: Korean
- Label: Cube
- Producer: Im Hyun-sik; MosPick; Simon Hong

Singles from Rendez-vous
- 1. "Dear Love" Released: October 14, 2019

Music video
- "DEAR LOVE" on YouTube

Rendez-vous is the debut extended play by South Korean Im Hyun-sik of BtoB. The album was released on October 14, 2019, by Cube Entertainment under U-CUBE and Kakao M distribution.

The song was released through several music portals, including MelOn, iTunes, and Spotify.

On January 31, 2020, a live album of Rendez-vous was released.

== Background ==
The main theme of the album is space. In particular about the encounters and connections in the outer space. The album contains a total of six songs, including the title song Dear Love and its instrumental version, Rendez-vous, Docking, Black and Moonlight.

== Music structure ==
Rendez-vous album would tell a diverse stories about universe across alternative, rock and synth-pop genre. The title track Dear Love genre is alternative that harmonizes Im's soft voice and guitar with poetic lyrics.

== Release ==
Cube Entertainment released a spoiler image for Im's first solo album, on September 22. The image reveals a person wearing a space suit raising his finger toward the universe. In particular, the English name of Im Hyun-sik, along with the code number "RD-V1102-3". The release of the record was first announced on September 24, 2019. Starting October 4 to 6, Cube Entertainment released a series of teasers to promote Rendez-vous. The following day, a highlight medley for the record were released. On October 9 and 10, two music video trailer for "Dear Love" was released. First, it contained Im screaming of approaching objects faced in outer space, and the second showed the first moment that Im encounters an unidentified person who is similarly dressed in outer space.

== Promotion ==
Im held his first sold out solo concert RENDEZ-VOUS at Bluesquare iMarket Hall on November 2 and 3, 2019.

== Track listing ==
No.	Title	Lyrics	Music	Arrangement	Length
1.	"Rendez-vous"	Im Hyun-sik	Im Hyun-sik	Im Hyun-sik
2.	"Docking"	Im Hyun-sik	Im Hyun-sik	Im Hyun-sik
3.	"Black"	Im Hyun-sik	Im Hyun-sik; MosPick	Im Hyun-sik; MosPick
4.	"Moonlight"	Im Hyun-sik	Im Hyun-sik; MosPick	Im Hyun-sik; MosPick
5.	"Dear Love"	Im Hyun-sik	Im Hyun-sik	Im Hyun-sik
6.	"Dear Love" (Inst.)	Im Hyun-sik	Im Hyun-sik	Im Hyun-sik

== Personnel ==
Personnel adapted from the liner notes of the physical album.

- Im Hyun-sik – all vocals; writer (all tracks); producer (all tracks); chorus (all tracks); Guitar (tracks: 1, 2, 5); brass (tracks: 1, 2, 5); drum (tracks: 1, 2, 5); Computer Programming (tracks: 1, 2, 5); synthesizer (tracks: 1, 2, 5)
- MosPick – producer (tracks: 3, 4)
- Ferdy – guitar (tracks: 3, 4)
- Seon Young-jin – E.P (tracks: 3, 4)
- CUBE Trainee – special chorus (track 5)
- Jukjae – guitar (track 5)

== Charts ==
Chart (2019)	Peak position
South Korean Albums (Gaon)	4

== Release history ==
Region	Date	Format	Label
Various	October 14, 2019	Digital download, streaming	Cube Entertainment, U Cube, Kakao M
