= This Is Us (EP) =

- Digital and streaming cover

EP by BtoB
- Released: June 18, 2018
- Recorded: 2018
- Genre: K-pop; Ballad
- Length: 24:19
- Language: Korean
- Label: Cube; Kakao M

BtoB chronology
Brother Act. (2018)	This Is Us (2018)	Hour Moment (2018)

Alternative cover
- Feel version

Singles from This Is Us
- 1. "The Feeling" Released: June 11, 2018; 2. "Only One for Me" Released: June 18, 2018

This Is Us (stylized as THIS IS US) is the eleventh extended play by South Korean boy group BtoB. It was released by Cube Entertainment on June 18, 2018, distributed by Kakao M. The album contains seven songs, including pre-release song, "The Feeling" and title track "Only One for Me". The physical version is available in two versions: "See" and "Feel".

The members of BtoB contributed in the making of the EP and described this album, "This is BtoB's color".

== Background ==
The EP was first teased by Cube with GIF (moving image) format with the comeback date and album name in the blue sea background on May 23, 2018. In a pictorial interview with Singles. Member Sungjae mentioned the concept of the new album, "If I want to give a hint for the album, it would be nice to think of it as the summer version of "Missing You"."

== Artwork and packaging ==
BtoB released two album versions for This Is Us containing different concept. In See version, the members' showcased their refreshing and bright smiles against the background of the sea and the sandy beach. For Feel version, BtoB revealed a sexy and dreamy concept.

== Songs ==
This Is Us contains seven tracks chosen by the members in order to show BtoB's self-confidence without adding or subtracting the album's name. According to BtoB, the album is an album where listeners can feel the unchanging appearance of BtoB and raw BtoB that crosses the spectrum of the genre, from the tropical sound dance song, "Call Me" to the electronic pop genre, "The Feeling". All members participated in writing and composing the album.

"The Feeling" is a pre-release song. It is an electronic pop-style song that begins with a mysterious ambience and a synthesizer that contains the feelings of love and emotions of a young men and women falling in love and summer. It is described as it allows listerners's to feel the soundscape that is richer than before by adding electronic sound to acoustic sound. Members Minhyuk and Peniel participated in the songwriting, and member Ilhoon, along with composers Vincenzo, Any Masingga, and Fuxxy, participated in the writing and composition of the song.

The title track, "Only One For Me" was composed and produced by the members Hyunsik and Minhyuk, Peniel and Ilhoon participated in the lyrics, the lyrics expressing "I miss you very much. No matter how I think about it, I still can't live without you." It is a song about a man who will regret his life if he can't hold onto the person he missed It is a song that sang the heart of the song. Through the coolness that flows throughout the song, the earnest confession and innocence were unduly and plainly. The song was described as "a cool confession song that shows, This is BTOB". The song started with Changsub's vocal and then speeds up with Ilhoon's rap, and then leads to the chorus from Hyunsik and Eunkwang, and the chorus is 'I can't live without you, You're the only one I need'.

== Critical reception ==
"The Feeling"
Won from XSports News wrote that "The Feeling" "makes the hearts of the listeners overwhelm, is impressive. Sometimes the heart beats, and the excitement grows as if flying in the sky, the heart spreads farther than the universe." After the release of "The Feeling", the song became a hot topic. The group ranked first in real-time search terms on Naver portal site. Ilhoon posted on Twitter, “#1 real-time! “The Feeling” was posted to convey his joy to the fans.

"Only One For Me"
In her review for Seoul Economic Daily, Lee Hana wrote in her article that "Previously, if "Missing You" was a lyrical ballad song that evokes autumn sensibility. This song is close to the summer version of it. – This song adds a unique voice of the members over the synth pattern and lyrical acoustic sound that feels refreshing." and further added, "In the chorus, you can see the pleasant emotion unique to BtoB. Among them, the part shouting 'Let's get it on' induces 'Techang' and adds addiction to the song."

== Commercial performance ==
"The Feeling" debuted at the top of major music charts in Genie Music, Soribada, and Olleh Music after it released.

"Only One For Me" recorded good performance in various music charts with female idol singers who are strong in music performance such as BlackPink and Taeyeon as competitors. The song debuted and charted at 5th in Melon, 4th in Bugs, 7th in Genie, Mnet and Olleh Music, and 9th in Naver Music. It rose one step every hour to second place at 10 KST on Melon real-time chart, the largest music site in Korea.

== Promotion ==
On May 28, 2020, Cube released a time table for BtoB's eleventh extended play through their official homepage and SNS, which shows the group's promotion schedule beginning June 4 until the release of their album on June 19. According to the released schedule teaser, after the first, second and third concept image released, on June 9, an audio teaser of the pre-release song "The Feeling" was released. The song was released digitally on June 11. Cube held BTOB Road from Apgujeongrodeo station to the southern end of Seongsu Bridge, and BTOB Digital Poster at Hongik University station, Sinchon station, and Gangnam station. On June 15, BtoB released an audio teaser video of its eleventh mini album.

BtoB kick off their activities starting with the appearance on the JTBC's Idol Room, which was aired on June 16.

== Track listing ==
This Is Us track listing
No.	Title	Lyrics	Music	Arrangement	Length
1.	"Call Me"	Ilhoon; IL; Minhyuk; Peniel	Ilhoon; IL	IL; Ilhoon	3:16
2.	"Only One for Me" (너 없인 안 된다)	Hyunsik; EDEN; Minhyuk; Peniel; Ilhoon	Hyunsik; EDEN	Hyunsik; EDEN	3:46
3.	"Yeah"	Ilhoon; Minhyuk; Peniel	Ilhoon; Fuxxy; VINCENZO; Any Masingga	Fuxxy	2:58
4.	"Blue Moon"	Minhyuk; Peniel; Ilhoon	Lee Minhyuk; Yang Seunguk; Yun Gukhyeong	Yang Seunguk; Yun Gukhyeong	4:01
5.	"IceBreaker"	Minhyuk; Peniel; Ilhoon	KAIROS; samUIL	KAIROS; samUIL; Wes Koz; K.O	2:56
6.	"1,2,3"	Seo Jaewoo; Im Hyunsik; Laeng Ssi	Seo Jaewoo; Im Hyunsik	Seo Jaewoo	3:26
7.	"The Feeling"	Ilhoon; Minhyuk; Peniel	Ilhoon; Fuxxy; VINCENZO; Any Masingga	VINCENZO; Any Masingga	3:56
Total length:					24:19

== Music video ==
An accompanying music video for "Only One for Me" was uploaded to BtoB's official YouTube channel on June 18, 2018.

== Charts ==
=== Album chart ===
Weekly sales chart performance for This Is Us
Chart (2018)	Peak position
South Korean Albums (Gaon)	2
US World Albums (Billboard)	15

Chart (2019)	Peak position
South Korean Albums (Gaon)	71

Monthly sales chart performance for This Is Us
Chart (2018)	Peak position
South Korean Albums (Gaon)	4

Year-end sales chart performance for This Is Us
Chart (2018)	Peak position
South Korean Albums (Gaon)	37

=== Song chart ===
Sales chart performance for singles from This Is US
Song	Chart (2018)	Peak position
"The Feeling"	South Korea (Gaon)	18
"The Feeling"	South Korea (K-pop Hot 100)	
"Only One for Me"	South Korea (Gaon)	4
"Only One for Me"	South Korea (K-pop Hot 100)	4

Other charted songs from This Is Us
Title	Year	Peak
"Blue Moon"	2018	62
"Call me"	2018	75
"Yeah"	2018	90
"1, 2, 3"	2018	96

== Certifications and sales ==
Region	Certification	Certified units/sales
South Korea	—	119,401

== Music program wins ==
Program	Date	Episode
Show Champion (MBC Music)	June 27	275
The Show (SBS MTV)	July 3	154

== Release history ==
Release formats for This Is US
Region	Date	Format	Distributor
South Korea	June 18, 2018	CD, digital download, streaming	Cube; Kakao M
Various	June 18, 2018	CD, digital download, streaming	Cube; Kakao M
