= Feel'eM =

EP by BtoB
- Released: March 6, 2017
- Recorded: 2017
- Genre: K-pop; dance-pop
- Length: 19:41
- Language: Korean
- Label: Cube Entertainment; LOEN Entertainment

BtoB chronology
| New Men (2016) | Feel'eM (2017) | Brother Act. (2017) |

Singles from Feel'eM
- 1. "Someday" Released: February 24, 2017; 2. "Movie" Released: March 6, 2017

Music videos
- "MOVIE" on YouTube

Feel'eM is the tenth extended play by South Korean boy group BtoB. It was released on March 6, 2017, by Cube Entertainment under distribution by LOEN Entertainment. The EP features five tracks in total with a variety of genres.

== Track listing ==
| No. | Title | Lyrics | Music | Arrangement | Length |
|---|---|---|---|---|---|
| 1. | "Just Say It" (말만 해) | Im Hyun-sik; Lee Min-hyuk; Peniel; Jung Il-hoon; EDEN | Im Hyun-sik; EDEN | Im Hyun-sik; EDEN | 3:36 |
| 2. | "Movie" | Jung Il-hoon; IL; Lee Min-hyuk; Peniel | Jung Il-hoon; IL | IL; Jung Il-hoon | 3:43 |
| 3. | "About Time" | Lee Min-hyuk; Jung Il-hoon | Lee Min-hyuk; Wynn & Jerry.L (MAJORIG) | Lee Min-hyuk; Wynn & Jerry.L (MAJORIG) | 3:45 |
| 4. | "Rock n Hiphop" (빨리 뛰어) | Seo Jae-woo; Kang Dong-ha; Lee Min-hyuk; Peniel; Jung Il-hoon | Seo Jae-woo; Kang Dong-ha; Devine Channel | Seo Jae-woo; Kang Dong-ha | 3:39 |
| 5. | "Someday" (언젠가) | Im Hyun-sik; Lee Min-hyuk; Peniel; Jung Il-hoon | Im Hyun-sik | Im Hyun-sik; Son Young-jin | 4:47 |
| Total length: | | | | | 19:41 |

== Charts ==
=== Weekly charts ===
| Chart (2017) | Peak position |
|---|---|
| South Korean Weekly Album Chart (Gaon) | 2 |
| US World Albums (Billboard) | 15 |

=== Monthly charts ===
| Chart (2017) | Peak position |
|---|---|
| South Korean Monthly Albums Chart (Gaon) | 4 |

== Sales ==
| Region | Sales |
|---|---|
| South Korea (Gaon) | 70,141+ |
| Japan (Oricon) | 785+ |

== Release history ==
| Region | Date | Format | Label(s) |
|---|---|---|---|
| South Korea | March 6, 2017 | CD, digital download | Cube Entertainment, LOEN Entertainment |
| Various | March 6, 2017 | Digital download | Cube Entertainment, LOEN Entertainment |

== Music program wins ==
| Program | Date | Episode |
|---|---|---|
| Show Champion (MBC Music) | March 15 | 220 |
