= Im Hyun-sik (singer) =

South Korean singer (born 1992)

Lim Hyun-sik
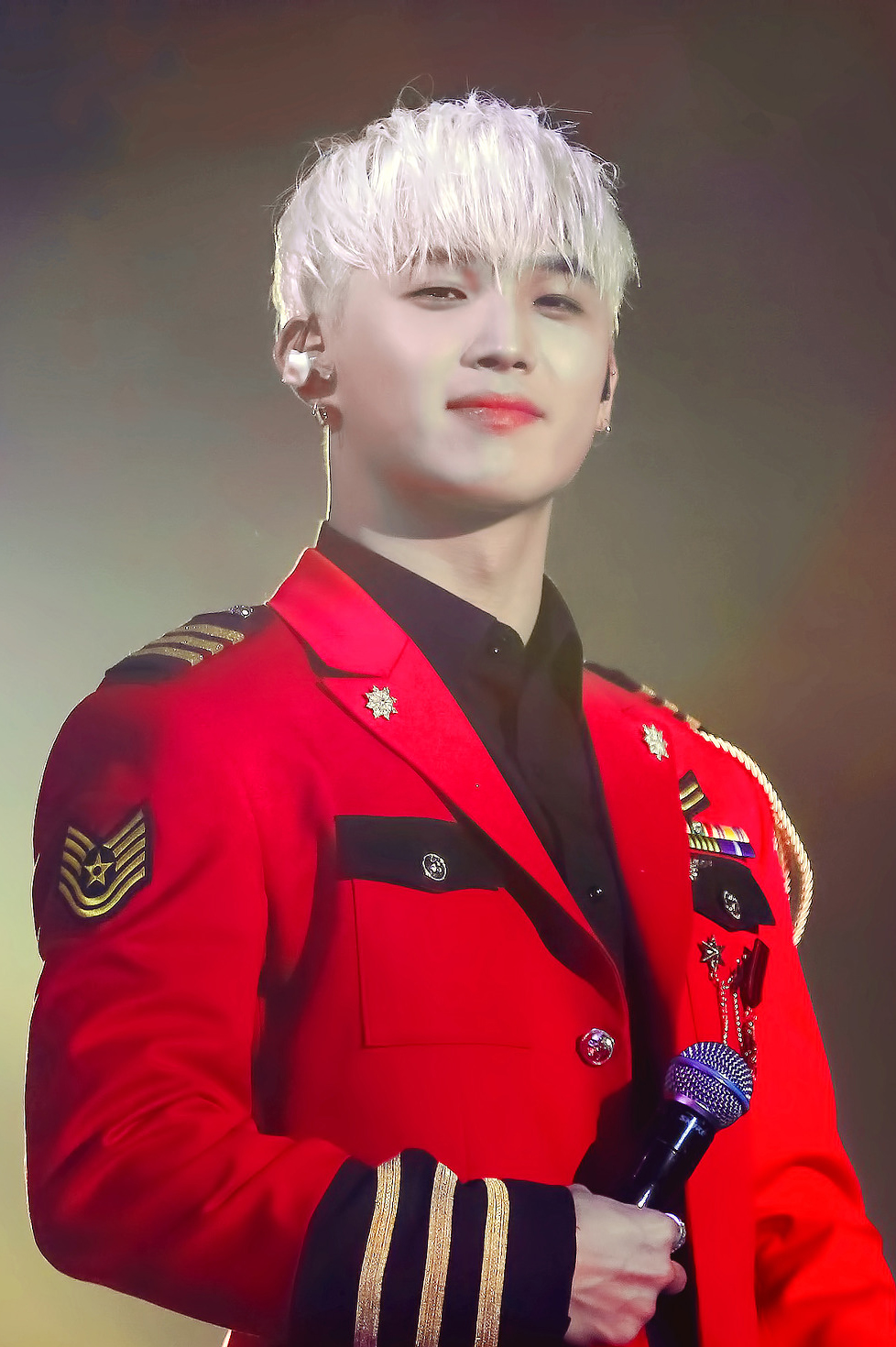
- Im in February 2017
- Born: Lim Hyun-sik (Im Hyun-sik); March 7, 1992 (age 34); Seoul, South Korea
- Education: Joongbu University (Masters); Howon University (Bachelors)
- Occupations: Singer-songwriter; composer
- Years active: 2012–present
- Father: Im Jiehoon
- Musical career
- Genres: K-pop; dance-pop; R&B; ballad; Rock
- Instrument: Vocals
- Labels: Cube; BtoB Company
- Member of: BtoB
- Formerly of: BtoB Blue
- Website: instagram.com/imhyunsik

Signature
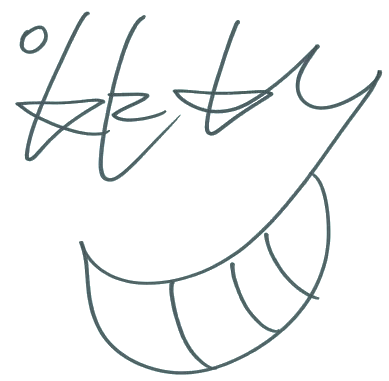

- Korean name
- Hangul: 임현식
- Hanja: 任炫植
- RR: Im Hyeonsik
- MR: Im Hyŏnsik

Lim Hyun-sik (Korean: 임현식; born March 7, 1992), simply known as Hyunsik, is a South Korean singer-songwriter and composer, and lead singer of the boy group BtoB.

== Biography ==
Lim Hyun-sik was born on March 7, 1992, in Seoul, South Korea. His father, Im Jiehoon, is a folk singer. He studied Practical Music at Howon University with group-mate Lee Chang-sub. Lim also graduated from Joongbu University with a Master's degree in Practical Music.

== Career ==
Lim debuted as the lead singer Cube Entertainment's boy group BtoB on March 21, 2012, with the promotional single "Insane". The group has released a total of 3 studio albums and 10 extended plays since debut.

In September 2016, Lim became part of BtoB's first unit group, BtoB Blue, which released the digital single "Stand By Me" on September 19, 2016. On August 2, 2018, BtoB Blue released their second digital single, "When It Rains".

In October 2019, Lim released an EP. Rendez-vous is the first solo album released by Lim in seven years since his debut. He participated in writing, composing, and arranging all the songs in the album. Following his solo debut, he held his first solo concert Rendez-vous at Bluesquare iMarket Hall on November 2 and 3, 2019 which was sold out in four minutes. On November 19, he prepared a surprised busking event for his fans with an attendance of 1,000 people. At the end of the year, he held his first solo fan meeting Dear Melody in Manila, Philippines.

In 2020, Lim appeared on KBS's Open Concert, performing "Dear Love" and two songs with his father. On January 31, 2020, Lim released his first live album, Rendez-vous (Live) that features a live version of 5 songs from his first solo concert Rendez-vous.

In 2022, Lim became the host of Naver Now's Late Night Studio.

On 13 Oct to 15 Oct 2023, Lim held three sold out concerts titled "Dive Into You" at Blue Square in Seoul. Guests included his father (Day 2), BtoB members (Day 3) and Prince Merman (all days). As part of the setlist, he performed 4 new songs which were to be included in his next solo album.

Since 2022, Lim has been promoted to a full member of KOMCA (Korea Music Copyright Association).

BtoB, including Lim, departed from Cube in November 2023. In February 2024, BtoB announced the establishment of BtoB Company for the group activities and for Lim's solo activities.

Lim released his second mini album, The Young Man and the Deep Sea, on February 16, 2024, with the lead single "La Mar". An eponymous documentary film directed by Kwon Jinmo about the filming of the music video for "La Mar" in Palau premiered as a competitive entry under the Korean Competition feature-length film category at the 20th Jecheon International Music & Film Festival.

== Personal life ==
On May 6, 2020, Lim announced on his Instagram that he is enlisting in mandatory military service on May 11, serving as a member of military band.

On November 1, 2021, the agency announced that Lim will be discharged from military service on November 14, 2021, without returning to the unit after his last vacation in accordance with the Ministry of National Defense guidelines for prevention of the spread of COVID-19

== Discography ==
=== Live albums ===
List of live albums, with selected chart positions and sales figures
Title	Details	Peak chart positions	Sales
Title	Details	KOR	Sales
Rendez-vous + Live Album	Released: January 31, 2020; Labels: Cube Entertainment; Formats: CD, digital download, streaming	10	KOR: 2,814

=== Extended plays ===
List of extended plays, with selected chart positions and sales
Title	Details	Peak chart positions	Sales
Title	Details	KOR	Sales
Rendez-vous	Released: October 14, 2019; Label: Cube Entertainment; Formats: CD, digital download, streaming	4	KOR: 29,923
The Young Man and the Deep Sea	Released: February 16, 2024; Label: DOD; Formats: CD, digital download, streaming	9	KOR: 31,792

=== Singles ===
Title	Year	Peak chart positions	Sales	Album
Title	Year	KOR	Sales	Album
As lead artist
"Swimming"	2017	89	KOR: 18,854	Piece of BTOB Vol. 4
"If I Hug You" (너를 안고 있으면)	2017	—	—N/a	Hyena on the Keyboard
"Dear Love"	2019	159	—N/a	Rendez-vous
"In Your Heart" (남아있어)	2020	—	—N/a	In Your Heart
"La Mar" (고독한 바다)	2024	—	—N/a	The Young Man and the Deep Sea
"The Answer" (나의 대답)	2025	—	—N/a	Non-album single
Collaborations
"Playground" ((with Eden Beatz)	2015	—	—N/a	Non-album single
"Baby Ride" (with Luizy)	2016	—	—N/a	Baby Ride
"Eating Alone" (혼밥) (with Luizy)	2017	—	—N/a	Sing For You – Seventh Story Change
"Cream-like Wave" (크림같은 파도 (with Lim Jiehoon)	2018	—	—N/a	IM JIEHOON
"Rainy Apgujeong" (비오는 압구정) (with Yoon Gun)	2018	86	—N/a	Non-album single
"Follow Your Dreams" (한걸음) (with BtoB, Jo Kwon, Pentagon, (G)I-dle, CLC & Yoo Seonho)	2018	—	—N/a	ONE
"Love It Is" (사랑이야) (with Lim Jiehoon)	2022	—	—N/a	VOL 135: Yoo Hee Yeol's Sketchbook and With You: 88th Voice
"Again" (다시) (with Lee Minwoo)	2024	—	—N/a	Again
"오늘은 내가 꽃일 수도 있고" (with Lim Jiehoon and Lim Yoon-Sik)	2024	—	—N/a	Im Jiehoon 40th Anniversary Collection 'Crayon'
"In My Heart" (담아본다) (with Mellow Kitchen)	2024	—	—N/a	Mellow Kitchen Monthly Release
Soundtrack appearances
"Past Days" (지난 날) (with Yong Junhyung, Ha Yeon-soo, Lee Minhyuk, Lee Changsub & Yook Sungjae)	2013	56	KOR: 87,730	Monstar OST
"After Time Passes" (시간이 흐른 뒤엔) (with Yong Junhyung, Lee Minhyuk, Lee Changsub & Yook Sungjae)	2013	32	KOR: 125,359	Monstar OST
"First Love" (첫사랑) (with Yong Junhyung, Lee Minhyuk, Lee Changsub & Yook Sungjae)	2013	61	KOR: 36,395	Monstar OST
"Ambiguous" (알듯 말듯해) (with Seo Eunkwang & Yook Sung-jae)	2017	37	KOR: 155,093+	Fight for My Way OST
"Say You Love Me"	2019	—	—N/a	On the Campus (So BE It) OST
"See The Light"	2024	—	—N/a	When the Phone Rings OST
"—" denotes releases that did not chart or were not released in that region.

=== Song Production Credits ===
All song credits are adapted from the Korea Music Copyright Association's database unless stated otherwise.

==== BtoB ====
List of songs, showing year released, and name of the album
Title	Year	Album	Lyricist	Composer	Producer
"Why" (왜이래)	2013	Thriller	Yes	Yes	No
"Star" (별)	2013	Thriller	Yes	Yes	No
"Never Ending (Melody)" (끝나지 않을 Melody)	2014	Beep Beep	Yes	Yes	No
"I Don't Know" (몰라)	2014	Move	Yes	Yes	Yes
"Shake It!"	2014	Move	Yes	Yes	Yes
"You Can't Cry" (울면 안 돼)	2014	The Winter's Tale	Yes	Yes	Yes
"Drink!" (마셔!)	2014	The Winter's Tale	No	Yes	No
"Summer Romance"	2015	Complete	Yes	Yes	No
"My Friend's Girlfriend" (친구의 여자친구)	2015	Complete	Yes	Yes	No
"I Miss You" (보고파)	2015	Complete	Yes	Yes	Yes
"I'll Be Here" (여기 있을게)	2015	I Mean	Yes	Yes	No
"Killing Me"	2016	Remember That	Yes	Yes	Yes
"Anymore"	2016	Remember That	Yes	No	No
"New Men"	2016	New Men	Yes	Yes	Yes
"Pray (I'll Be Your Man)" (기도)	2016	New Men	Yes	Yes	Yes
"I Love You Forever"	2016	New Men	Yes	No	No
"Someday" (언젠가)	2017	Feel'eM	Yes	Yes	Yes
"Just Say It" (말만 해)	2017	Feel'eM	Yes	Yes	Yes
"Eating Alone" (혼밥)	2017	Sing For You – and Seventh Story Change	Yes	No	No
"Swimming"	2017	Piece of BtoB Vol. 4	Yes	Yes	Yes
"Prelude: A Day" (하루)	2017	Brother Act	No	Yes	Yes
"Missing You" (그리워하다)	2017	Brother Act	Yes	Yes	Yes
"Red Lie" (새빨간 거짓말)	2017	Brother Act	Yes	Yes	No
"Blowin' Up" (신바람)	2017	Brother Act	Yes	Yes	No
"Running into Break Up" (이별을 만나다)	2017	Brother Act	No	Yes	No
"Whisper" (속삭임)	2017	Brother Act	No	Yes	No
"Only One For Me" (너 없인 안 된다)	2018	This is Us	Yes	Yes	Yes
"1, 2, 3"	2018	This is Us	Yes	Yes	No
"When It Rains" (비가내리면)	2018	BtoB-Blue Single	Yes	Yes	No
"Beautiful Pain" (아름답고도 아프구나)	2018	HOUR MOMENT	Yes	Yes	Yes
"Show Your Love"	2020	Inside	Yes	Yes	Yes
"Waiting 4 U"	2021	4U: Outside	Yes	Yes	Yes
"Intro: The Trace" (Intro: 발자취)	2022	Be Together	No	Yes	Yes
"The Song" (노래)	2022	Be Together	Yes	Yes	Yes
"Be Together" (우리)	2022	Be Together	Yes	Yes	Yes
"My Way"	2022	Be Together	Yes	Yes	Yes
"Interlude: Re"	2022	Be Together	No	Yes	Yes
"Lonely"	2022	Be Together	Yes	Yes	Yes
"Dance With Me" (춤)	2022	Be Together	Yes	Yes	Yes
"Outro: Encore"	2022	Be Together	Yes	Yes	Yes
"Wind And Wish" (나의 바람)	2023	Wind And Wish	Yes	Yes	Yes
"Day & Night"	2023	Wind And Wish	Yes	Yes	Yes
"Your Love"	2023	Wind And Wish	Yes	Yes	Yes
"Please Stay" (불씨)	2024	BECOMING PROJECT	Yes	Yes	Yes
"Be Alright"	2024	BECOMING PROJECT	Yes	Yes	Yes

Solo work

List of songs, showing year released, and name of the album
Title	Year	Album	Lyricist	Composer	Producer
"Swimming"	2017	Piece of Btob Vol.4	Yes	Yes	Yes
"If I Hug You" (너를 안고 있으면)	2018	Hyena on the Keyboard	Yes	Yes	Yes
"Say You Love Me"	2019	On the Campus (So BE It) OST	Yes	Yes	Yes
"Rendez-vous"	2019	Rendez-vous	Yes	Yes	Yes
"Docking"	2019	Rendez-vous	Yes	Yes	Yes
"Black"	2019	Rendez-vous	Yes	Yes	Yes
"Moonlight"	2019	Rendez-vous	Yes	Yes	Yes
"Dear Love"	2019	Rendez-vous	Yes	Yes	Yes
"In Your Heart" (남아있어)	2020	In Your Heart	Yes	Yes	Yes
"The Tides of Life" (밀물과 썰물)	2024	The Young Man and the Deep Sea	Yes	Yes	Yes
"La Mar" (고독한 바다)	2024	The Young Man and the Deep Sea	Yes	Yes	Yes
"Deep Blue Sea"	2024	The Young Man and the Deep Sea	Yes	Yes	Yes
"Sunshine"	2024	The Young Man and the Deep Sea	Yes	Yes	Yes
"Navigate" (항해)	2024	The Young Man and the Deep Sea	Yes	Yes	Yes

==== Other artists ====
List of songs, showing year released, artist, and name of the album
Title	Year	Artist	Album	Lyricist	Composer	Producer
"From When and Until When" (with Yang Yoseob) (어디부터 어디까지; Eodibuteo Eodikkaji)	2014	Hyuna	A Talk	Yes	Yes	No
"Young Love" 어린애(愛)"	2016	Sungjae and Joy	어린愛	Yes	Yes	Yes
"Follow Your Dreams" (한걸음)	2018	United Cube Artists	ONE	Yes	Yes	Yes
"Love Again"	2020	Seo Eunkwang	FoRest: Entrance	Yes	Yes	No
"Mirror" (거울)	2022	Lee Su-jeong	My Name	No	Yes	No
"At The End of the Day" (하루 끝에)	2023	WEi	Love Pt.3: Eternally	Yes	Yes	Yes
"Be My Love"	2024	VANNER	Capture The Flag	Yes	Yes	Yes
"In My Heart" (담아본다)	2024	Mellow Kitchen	Mellow Kitchen Monthly Release	Yes	No	Yes

== Filmography ==
=== Film ===
Year	Title	Role	Notes	Ref.
2024	The Young Man and the Deep Sea	Himself	Documentary film, directed by Kwon Jinmo	

=== Television series ===
Year	Title	Role	Notes	Ref.
2012	I Live in Cheongdam-dong	Invincible Cheongdam	With Eunkwang, Minhyuk, Ilhoon, and C-Clown's Minwoo	
2013	The Heirs	Himself	Cameo with BtoB, Episode 4	
2013	Monstar	Himself	With BtoB, Episodes 1, 2, 6 and 9	
2013	When a Man Falls in Love	Himself	Cameo with BtoB, Episode 8	
2015	The Village: Achiara's Secret	Himself	Cameo with BtoB, Episode 14	
2018	Dae Jang Geum Is Watching	Im Heon-sik		

=== Variety shows ===
Year	Title	Notes	Ref.
2016	Battle Trip	Contestant with Yook Sungjae, Seo Eunkwang, episode 16	
2017	King of Mask Singer	Contestant as "Parrot", episode 123	
2018	Immortal Songs 2	Contestant, Lunar New Year Special, episode 342	
2018	Sugarman 2	Contestant; episode 13	
2018	Hyena on the Keyboard	Producer, episode 4–6	
2018	Law of the Jungle in Mexico	Cast member with Seo Eun-kwang, episode 314–320	
2019	KBS Music Shuffle, The Hit	Contestant with Jung Il-hoon and Eddy Kim	
2022	Begin Again	Guest with Seo Eunkwang & Kwon Jinah	

=== Narration ===
Year	Title	Notes	Ref.
2019	Listening to the Book	Novel narrator; The Metamorphosis by Franz Kafka.	

=== Web shows ===
Year	Title	Role	Notes	Ref.
2022	BtoB Hyunsik's Late Night Studio	Host	Naver NOW	
2022	Tension	Host	TikTok Stage On Air; with Seo Eunkwang	
2023	Jo Hyunah's Thursday Nights Ep.14	Guest	YouTube Show; with Seo Eunkwang	
2024	Paul Kim's Remaining Chestnut Peeling EP.4	Guest	YouTube Show	
2024	Park SungJJIN S2 EP.14	Guest	YouTube Show	
2024	When Three Gagmen Gather Ep.28	Host	YouTube Show; with Seo Eunkwang & Peniel	
2024	Super Junior D&E Wanna Come Here? Ep.7	Guest	YouTube Show; with Seo Eunkwang	
2024	Jaejoong's Jaefriends Ep.51	Guest	YouTube Show; with Lee Minhyuk	
