= Brother Act. =

Studio album by BtoB
- Released: October 16, 2017
- Recorded: 2017
- Genre: K-pop; Ballad; R&B
- Label: Cube Entertainment

BtoB chronology
Feel'eM (2017)	Brother Act. (2017)	This Is Us (2018)

Singles from Brother Act.
- 1. "Missing You" Released: October 16, 2017

Music videos
- "그리워하다 'Missing You'" on YouTube

Brother Act. is the second studio album by South Korean boy group BtoB. It was released on October 16, 2017, by Cube Entertainment and distributed by LOEN Entertainment. The album contains 13 tracks of which 12 tracks were released digitally and an additional track available only on physical album. BTOB members also participated in the album as co-lyricists and co-composers. The lead single "Missing You" is a pop ballad track written and composed by member Im Hyun-sik.

After releasing "Missing You" on 16 October 2017, it has reached 100,929,245 streams on 12 October 2018 according to Gaon's streaming count chart. Among songs released between 2017 and 2018, "Missing You" is ranked #25 in terms of streaming counts so far and was voted No.1 trusted song to listen in fall.

== Commercial performance ==
"Missing You" topped for 5 charts after 3 hours its release beating Movie. It also peaked at number two on the Gaon Digital Chart, becoming their highest charting single on the chart. They broke their record for earning NO #1 for 88 hours on Melon after debut. On June 17, 2019 "Missing You" became the 2nd longest charting idol group song on MelOn at 87 weeks.

== Track listing ==
No.	Title	Lyrics	Music	Arrangement	Length
1.	"Prelude: A Day" (하루)		Im Hyun-sik		0:59
2.	"Missing You" (그리워하다)	Im Hyun-sik; EDEN; Lee Min-hyuk; Jung Il-hoon; Peniel	Im Hyun-sik; EDEN	Im Hyun-sik; EDEN	3:56
3.	"My Lady"	Jung Il-hoon; IL; Lee Min-hyuk; Peniel	Jung Il-hoon; IL	Jung Il-hoon; IL	4:06
4.	"Red Lie" (새빨간 거짓말)	Seo Jaewoo; Ferdy; Im Hyun-sik; Lee Min-hyuk; Jung Il-hoon; Peniel	Seo Jaewoo; Ferdy; Im Hyun-sik	Seo Jaewoo; Ferdy	3:29
5.	"Blowin' Up" (신바람)	Seo Jaewoo; Im Hyun-sik; Lee Min-hyuk; Jung Il-hoon; Peniel	Seo Jaewoo; Im Hyun-sik; Jung Il-hoon	Seo Jaewoo	3:57
6.	"Interlude: Brother Act."				2:19
7.	"Nanana" (나나나)	Big Sancho; Jo Sungho; Lee Min-hyuk; Jung Il-hoon; Peniel	Big Sancho; Jo Sungho	Big Sancho; Jo Sungho	3:28
8.	"Dreaming" (꿈에)	Son Young-jin; Jo Sungho; Lee Min-hyuk; Jung Il-hoon; Peniel	Son Young-jin; Jo Sungho	Son Young-jin; Jo Sungho	3:34
9.	"Guitar" (Stroke of Love)	Lee Min-hyuk; Jung Il-hoon; Peniel	Lee Min-hyuk; Yang Seung-wook; DJ AIN	Yang Seung-wook; DJ AIN	3:34
10.	"Running Into Breakup" (이별을 만나다)	Son Young-jin; Jo Sungho; Lee Min-hyuk; Jung Il-hoon; Peniel	Son Young-jin; Jo Sungho; Im Hyun-sik	Son Young-jin; Jo Sungho	3:53
11.	"Fly Away"	Jung Il-hoon; IL; Lee Min-hyuk; Peniel	Jung Il-hoon; IL	Jung Il-hoon; IL	3:38
12.	"Finale: Our Concert" (우리들의 콘서트)	Jo Sungho; Ferdy; Lee Min-hyuk; Jung Il-hoon; Peniel	Jo Sungho; Ferdy	Jo Sungho; Ferdy	4:00
Total length:					41:03

CD bonus track
No.	Title	Music	Arrangement	Length
13.	"Whisper" (속삭임)	Im Hyun-sik; EDEN	Kang Dong-ha

== Charts ==
Chart (2017)	Peak position
South Korean Weekly Albums (Gaon)	4
US World Albums (Billboard)	14

== Music program wins ==
Program	Date	Episode
Show Champion (MBC Music)	October 25	249
Show Champion (MBC Music)	November 8	250
M Countdown (Mnet)	October 26	546
M Countdown (Mnet)	November 2	547
Music Bank (KBS)	October 27	904
Inkigayo (SBS)	October 29	932
Inkigayo (SBS)	November 5	933

== See also ==
- List of Inkigayo Chart winners (2017)
