= Yook Sung-jae =

South Korean singer and actor (born 1995)

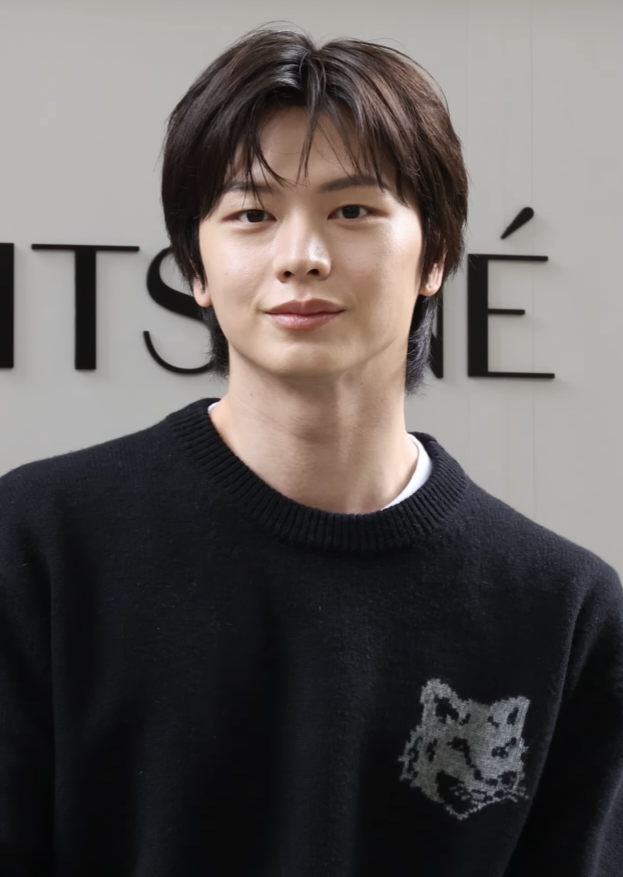
- Yook in September 2025
- Born: May 2, 1995 (age 31); Yongin, South Korea
- Education: Hanlim Multi Art School
- Occupations: Singer; actor
- Agent: iWill Media
- Musical career
- Genres: K-pop; dance-pop; R&B; ballad
- Years active: 2012–present
- Label: Cube
- Member of: BtoB; BtoB Blue
- Formerly of: Big Byung; United Cube

Korean name
- Hangul: 육성재
- Hanja: 陸性材
- RR: Yuk Seongjae
- MR: Yuk Sŏngjae

Signature
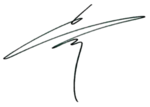

Yook Sung-jae (Korean: 육성재; born May 2, 1995), also known mononymously as Sungjae, is a South Korean singer and actor. He is a member of the boy group BtoB and its sub-group, BtoB Blue.

Aside from his group's activities, Yook has acted in television dramas Reply 1994 (2013), Plus Nine Boys (2014), Who Are You: School 2015 (2015), The Village: Achiara's Secret (2015), Guardian: The Lonely and Great God (2016), Mystic Pop-up Bar (2020) and The Golden Spoon (2022). He has appeared in several reality shows, including: Hitmaker, We Got Married, and Master in the House.

Yook released his debut solo album, Yook O'Clock, on March 2, 2020.

== Early life and education ==
Yook was born on May 2, 1995, in Suji District, Yongin, South Korea. He has one older sister. Yook comes from a business family. His father is the CEO of an IT corporation that deals with semiconductors. His grandfather was the first to introduce red carp in South Korea, while his grandmother operated a fishing farm in Paju.

He briefly stayed in Cebu, Philippines to study English. He completed his high school education at Hanlim Multi Art School, graduating in 2014. He then attended Dongshin University, majoring in Practical Music. Yook's diploma from Dongshin University was revoked by the Ministry of Education, after his attendance at the university was called into question.

== Career ==
=== Pre-debut ===
Yook entered the JYP 6th Audition Final Round prior to being cast by Cube Entertainment.

On August 10, 2010, he participated in the stage performance of "2010 Cube Stars Party".

On March 6, 2011, Yook also participated in the stage performance of "2011 CUBE Stars Party" with future bandmates Seo Eunkwang, Im Hyun-sik, Jung Il-hoon, and scrapped member Lee Min-woo.

=== 2012–2014: Career beginnings ===
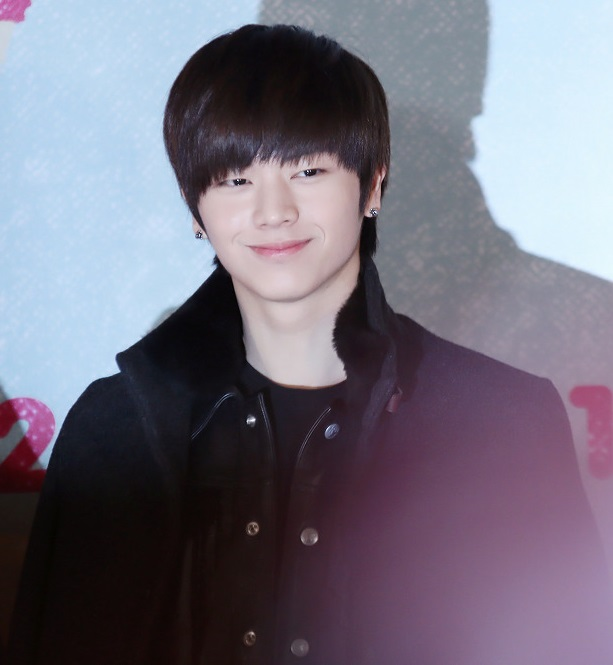
Yook in 2014

Yook made his debut as a vocalist of BtoB with "Insane" and "Imagine" on March 21, 2012. On March 23, 2012, Yook began co-hosting SBS MTV's The Show alongside bandmate Lee Min-hyuk.

In 2013, Yook made his acting debut in Monstar as part of the supporting cast alongside his bandmates Lee Min-hyuk, Lee Chang-sub and Im Hyun-sik. He, with BtoB's Lee Minhyuk, Lee Changsub, Im Hyunsik and Beast's Yong Jun-hyung were featured in the drama OST Part 1 titled "Days Gone By", OST Part 2 "After Time Passes", and OST Part 7 "First Love". In the same year, Sungjae and BtoB made a cameo appearance in hit drama The Heirs episode 4 as themselves, an idol group band BtoB.

In 2014, Yook appeared in the television series Reply 1994 as Sungjoon/Ssukssuk, Na-jung's little brother. In July 2014, Yook was cast as a presenter for the program, A Song For You alongside Kangin of Super Junior and Amber of f(x). He also participated in the first two seasons of Hitmaker, presented by South Korean producer duo Jeong Hyeong-don and Defconn debuting as part of the program's project unit group, Big Byung, together with Got7's Jackson and VIXX members, N and Hyuk. The group released two singles: "Stress Come On" and "Ojingeo Doenjang" (오징어 된장). The same year, he was cast in his first lead acting role in Plus Nine Boys, as a 19-year old Judo athlete. He then joined the reality-variety program Real Men from 2014 to 2015.

=== 2015–2017: Career breakout ===
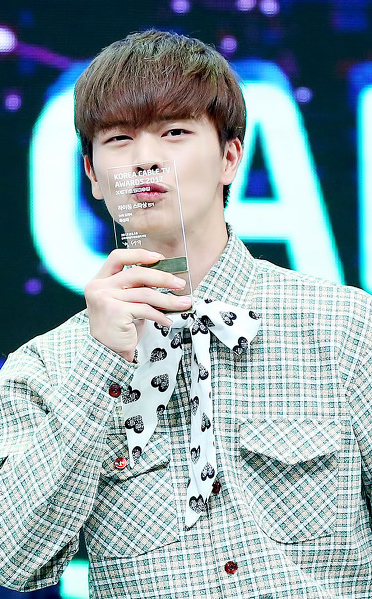
Yook in March 2017

Yook achieved his breakthrough when he landed a leading role in the teen drama Who Are You: School 2015, alongside Kim So-hyun and Nam Joo-hyuk. He participated in the drama's OST with "Love Song", a duet with Park Hye-soo. After the series ended, he experienced a rise in popularity and landed several endorsement deals. Yook then starred in the horror mystery series The Village: Achiara's Secret alongside Moon Geun-young in 2015. He received the "New Star award" for his performance in The Village: Achiara's Secret, and won "Best Couple award" with Kim So-hyun for Who Are You: School 2015.

In 2015, Yook joined King of Mask Singer, competing under the alias Tired Bumblebee, and received good feedback for his performance. He was paired up with Red Velvet's Joy in the fourth season of reality show We Got Married. The couple went on to release the duet "Young Love", with the pair contributing lyrics for the song with Im Hyun-sik serving as the song's producer. At the 2015 MBC Entertainment Awards, Yook received the "Best Couple award" alongside Joy and the "Best Male Rookie (in Variety) award". The couple departed from We Got Married on May 7, 2016.

In September 2015, Yook joinged Got7's Jackson Wang and actress Kim You-jung as part of the hosting team of the music-program Inkigayo and left the show in May 2016.

In 2016, Sungjae was appointed as an ambassador of the King Sejong Institution. In September 2016, Yook participated in the BtoB-Blue debut. From 2016 to 2017, Yook starred in the hit fantasy-romance drama Guardian: The Lonely and Great God.

In early 2017 Yook was cast for the reality-documentary show Law of the Jungle filmed in Sumatra, Indonesia. In August 2017, he participated in the digital single project, Piece of BtoB. He released the songs "Say It" and "Paradise", the latter having been personally composed and written by himself, on August 30. In late 2017, he joined the cast of the reality show, Master in the House.

On December 29, 2017, Cube Entertainment announced that Yook suffered a back injury and would be receiving treatment at the hospital. He had symptoms of lumbar disc herniation reportedly worsened during the concert 2017 BtoB Time - Our Concert. On January 5, 2018, Yook attended the press conference of Master in the House. This was the first time he appeared after recuperating from a lumbar injury; he gradually resumed his activities after 2 weeks of rest.

=== 2018–present: Solo debut, return to acting, departure from Cube Entertainment ===
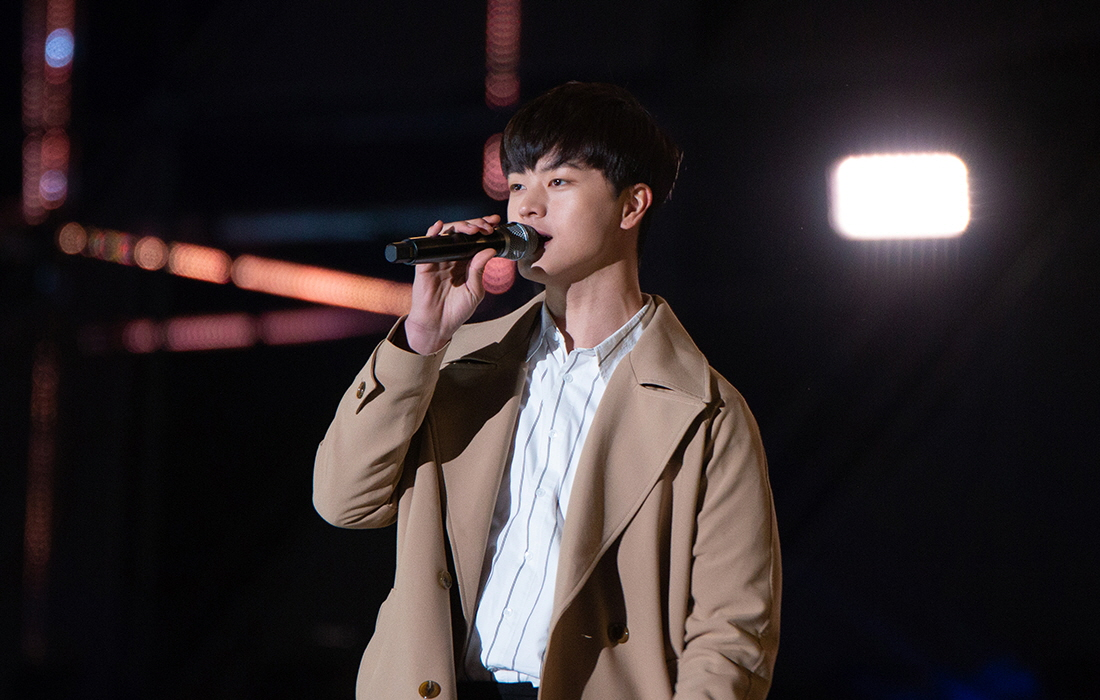
Yook in April 2018

In 2018, Yook held his first fan meeting, Paradise at TICC in Taiwan on February 11, Macpherson Stadium in Hong Kong on May 19, and in Manila, Philippines on July 13.

In 2019, during BtoB's seventh anniversary Yook was chosen as their new leader. Cube TV premiered a new reality show, "Lovely 95s" (예쁘장한 구오즈), featuring Yook on July 12. It was revealed that he planned and made his close same-aged 95s friends, former Boyfriend members Youngmin, Kwangmin and Minwoo, Teen Top's Ricky and model Baek Kyung Do to have a variety show.

On December 19, 2019, Cube revealed their plans for a new music project 3x2=6, which aims for Yook to release two songs every month for three months starting December 2019 and release it on various online music sites. Yook associated with the number '6' (pronounced as "yook" in Korean) to his surname 'Yook' (육). The project consists of three themes; Singer is to showcase his ability as an artist by releasing his first produced song, Human is his desire to be loved for a long time and BtoB Yook Sung-jae as his bandmates Jung Il-hoon and Peniel Shin participated in the project. The project began on December 26, 2019, with the release of its first single "Yook" (뭍(陸)) and "From Winter" (겨울 속에서) as part of 3x2=6 PArt 1. "Yook" is described as a melodic modern-rock genre song with Yook participating in the lyrics and composing. For 3x2=6 Part 2, Yook showed his reversed charm with "W.A.U" (What About U) and "Chicken". "Chicken" is a song with clever lyrics talking about how as time passes, no matter how much trends change, just like (fried) chicken that is loved by everyone. The song was released on January 16, 2020. The project concluded on February 6, 2020, with the first collaboration song between Yook and Ilhoon "HMHN" and "Hypnotized" which was performed with Peniel at 2018 BtoB Time - This Is Us concert.

After a three-year acting hiatus, Yook made a return to the small-screen as part of the main cast of Mystic Pop-up Bar, a JTBC drama based on a popular webtoon of the same name in early 2020. On February 18, Yook left the cast of Master in the House after two years on the show prior to his mandatory military service. Yook released his debut solo album, Yook O'Clock, on March 2, 2020, which consisted of six songs from 3X2=6 and lead single "Come with the Wind".

On November 6, 2023, it was announced that Yook would be leaving Cube Entertainment following the completion of his contract. On December 22, iWill Media, a production company, announced that Yook has signed an exclusive contract as its first managed actor.

In July 2024, Yook was announced as the lead in SBS TV's historical-fantasy drama The Haunted Palace, playing dual roles, broadcast in 2025.

== Personal life ==
=== Mandatory military service ===
On May 3, 2020, Yook announced on his Instagram that he is enlisting in mandatory military service on May 11, and was confirmed by Cube. According to My Daily, Yook will serve as part of the Ministry of National Defense military band after completing his five weeks of basic military training course at Nonsan Training Center.

On May 7, 2021, Yook and Teen Top's Ricky performed "Love Blossom" (original song from K.Will) at Seoul National Cemetery Spring Contact - Free Periodical Concert as part of their military service duty as a military band. The concert was held with the theme of 'Waiting for the normal daily life before the pandemic'. On June 6, Yook and Major Jeong Dong-mi hosted the 66th Memorial Day Commemoration Ceremony which was held by the Ministry of Patriots and Veterans Affairs in front of the Memorial Tower at the Seoul National Cemetery.

After taking his final military leave in October 2021, Yook announced that he would not return to his unit following the army's protocols regarding the COVID-19 pandemic. He was officially discharged from military service on November 14, 2021.

== Philanthropy ==
In 2015, Yook took part in a fundraiser that auction items to the Social Welfare Community Fund for Love to support low-income children. In December 2015, SBS revealed that Yook donated ₩3 million to Jeonbuk National University Hospital, which was the filming location of The Village: Achiara's Secret. The same year, he also participated in Briquette Sharing Campaign of the Korean Peninsula and donated briquettes to the people at Kowloon Village in Gangnam District, Seoul.

== Discography ==
=== Extended plays ===
List of extended plays, with selected chart positions and sales
Title	Details	Peak chart positions	Sales
Title	Details	KOR	Sales
Yook O'Clock	Released: March 2, 2020; Label: Cube Entertainment; Formats: CD, digital download	3	KOR: 27,992
All About Blue	Released: June 19, 2025; Label: IWill Media; Formats: CD, digital download	9	KOR: 26,425

=== Single albums ===
List of single albums, with selected chart positions and sales
Title	Details	Peak chart positions	Sales
Title	Details	KOR	Sales
Exhibition: Look Closely	Released: May 9, 2024; Label: iWill Media; Formats: CD, digital download	9	KOR: 41,093

=== Singles ===
Title	Year	Peak chart positions	Sales	Album
Title	Year	KOR	Sales	Album
Korean
As lead artist
"That Day Long Ago"	2015	55	KOR: 49,897	King of Masked Singer Special
"Tell Me" (말해)	2017	36	KOR: 34,273	Piece of BTOB Vol. 6
"Paradise"	2017	—	—N/a	Piece of BTOB Vol. 6
"Confession"	2018	34	—N/a	Your BGM Vol. 2
"Yook" (뭍 (陸))	2019	148	—N/a	3x2=6 Part 1
"W.A.U" (What About U)	2020	— (Note: "W.A.U" did not enter the Gaon Digital Chart, but debuted and peaked at number 80 on the component Download Chart.)	—N/a	3x2=6 Part 2
"Come with the Wind" (그날의 바람)	2020	107	—N/a	Yook O'Clock
"Be Somebody"	2024	—	—N/a	Exhibition: Look Closely
"Lie" (거짓말)	2025	171	—N/a	Non-album single
"at last" (이제야)	2025	— (Note: "at last" did not enter the Circle Digital Chart, but debuted and peaked at number 5 on the component Download Chart.)	—N/a	All About Blue
Japanese
"たったひとつの物語"	2025	—	—N/a	Non-album single
Collaborations
"Stress Come On" (with N, Jackson and Hyuk as Big Byung)	2014	—	—N/a	Non-album singles
"Ojingeo Doenjang" (with N, Jackson and Hyuk as Big Byung)	2015	—	—N/a	Non-album singles
"Photograph" (with Namjoo)	2015	29	KOR: 115,083	A Cube – For Season Blue Season 2
"Young Love" (with Joy)	2016	52	KOR: 77,990	Non-album singles
"Playing With Fire" (with NC.A)	2016	89	KOR: 25,667	Non-album singles
As featured artist
"On The Four Lane Road" (Geeks's Louie feat. Yook Sungjae)	2016	—	KOR: 24,311	Hwang Moon Seob
Soundtrack appearances
"Past Days" (with Junhyung, Ha Yeon-soo, Minhyuk, Changsub, Hyunsik)	2013	56	KOR: 87,730	Monstar OST
"After Time Passes" (with Junhyung, Minhyuk, Changsub, Hyunsik)	2013	32	KOR: 125,359	Monstar OST
"First Love" (with Junhyung, Minhyuk, Changsub, Hyunsik)	2013	61	KOR: 36,395	Monstar OST
"Curious" (궁금해) (with Oh Seung-hee)	2014	—	—N/a	Plus Nine Boys OST
"Love Song" (feat. Park Hye-soo)	2015	8	KOR: 144,539	Who Are You: School 2015 OST
"Loving You Again"	2015	62	KOR: 59,982	Scholar Who Walks The Night OST
"Ambiguous" (with Eunkwang, Hyunsik)	2017	37	KOR: 155,093	Fight for My Way OST
"Love Resembles Memories" (사랑은 추억을 닮아서)	2020	—	—N/a	Mystic Pop-up Bar OST
"—" denotes releases that did not chart or were not released in that region.

=== Songwriting credits ===
All credits are adapted from the Korea Music Copyright Association, unless cited otherwise.

Year	Song	Artist(s)	Album	Lyricist	Composer
2016	"Young Love"	BBYU (Himself with Joy)	Non-album single	Yes	No
2016	"Melody Song" (예지앞사)	BTOB	New Men	Yes	No
2017	"Paradise"	Himself	Piece of BTOB Vol. 6	Yes	Yes
2018	"Hypnotized"	Himself with Peniel	3X2=6 Project Part 3 and Yook O'Clock	Yes	Yes
2019	"Yook" (뭍 (陸))	Himself	3X2=6 Project Part 1 and Yook O'Clock	Yes	Yes
2024	"BE SOMEBODY"	Himself	EXHIBITION : Look Closely	Yes	No
2024	"Without You"	Himself	EXHIBITION : Look Closely	Yes	No

== Filmography ==
=== Television series ===
Key
†	Denotes television productions that have not yet been released

Year	Title	Role	Notes	Ref.
2013	Monstar	Arnold, Men in Black Member	Ep: 2, 6, 9, 12	
2013	The Heirs	Himself	Cameo (Episode 4)	
2013	Reply 1994	Sung Joon		
2014	Plus Nine Boys	Kang Min-gu		
2015	Who Are You: School 2015	Gong Tae-kwang		
2015	Orange Marmalade	Vampire Yook Sung-jae	Cameo (Episode 12)	
2015	The Village: Achiara's Secret	Park Woo-jae		
2016–2017	Guardian: The Lonely and Great God	Yoo Deok-hwa		
2018	Dae Jang Geum Is Watching	Oh Sung-jae	Cameo (Episode 16)	
2020	Mystic Pop-up Bar	Han Kang-bae		
2022	The Golden Spoon	Lee Seung-cheon		
2025	The Haunted Palace	Yoon Gap / Kang Chul		
2026–2027	Nine to Six †	Han Sun-woo		

=== Television show ===
Year	Title	Role	Notes	Ref.
2014	Hitmaker Season 1	Cast	with Got7's Jackson, VIXX's N and Hyuk	
2014	Real Men	Cast	Episode 77–88	
2014–2015	A Song For You Season 3	Cast	Season 3, with Super Junior's Kangin and f(x)'s Amber	
2015	Hitmaker Season 2	Cast	with Got7's Jackson, VIXX's N and Hyuk	
2015	Invisible Man	Cast		
2015	King of Mask Singer	Contestant	Tired Bumblebee (Episode 5–6), LP Boy (Special Live 2015)	
2015–2016	We Got Married	Cast	Season 4, with Red Velvet's Joy (Episode 276–320)	
2016	King of Mask Singer	Panelist	Special panelist (Episode 43–44)	
2016	Duet Song Festival	Contestant	with Jang Ji-seon (Episode 5)	
2016	Battle Trip	Contestant	with Seo Eun-kwang, Im Hyun-sik (Episode 16)	
2016	Idol Chef King	Contestant	Winner with Seo Eun-kwang	
2017	Fantastic Duo	Contestant	Winner paired with Gummy Season 2: Star Wars Special (Episode 19–20)	
2017	Clenched Fist-Boat Horn	Cast member	with Kim Byung-man, Kim Jong-min, Yook Jong-wan, Lee Sang-min, and Kang Ye-won	
2017	Celebrity Bromance	Cast member	with Boyfriend's Youngmin and Kwangmin	
2017	Law of the Jungle in Sumatra	Cast member	Episodes 256–261	
2017–2020	Master in the House	Cast member	With Lee Seung-gi, Lee Sang-yoon, Yang Se-hyung & Shin Sung-rok	
2019	Lovely 95s	Cast member	with Boyfriend's Youngmin, Kwangmin, Minwoo, Teen Top's Ricky and Baek Kyung Do	

=== Web shows ===
Year	Title	Role	Notes	Ref.
2024	Zombieverse	Regular member	Season 2	

=== Hosting ===
Year	Title	Notes	Ref.
2012	The Show	with Lee Min-hyuk	
2012	Best of Best	with Woo-hee	
2014	Mnet Wide Custom News		
2014–2015	A Song For You Season 3	with Super Junior's Kangin and f(x)'s Amber	
2015–2016	Inkigayo	with Kim You-jung & Got7's Jackson Wang	
2016	Radio Star	Special DJ ep. 495	
2017	DMZ Peace Concert	With Sistar's Soyou	
2017	Korea Music Festival	with NCT's Jaehyun & Jang Ye-won	
2018	Happy Together	Special host ep. 564	
2020	My Little Old Boy	Special MC - Episodes 180	
2021	66th Memorial Day Commemoration Ceremony	with Jeong Dong-mi	
2025	SBS INGALIVE UNI-CON in TOKYO DOME	with Nmixx's Sullyoon, Zerobaseone's Han Yu-jin (Day 1) & Aespa's Karina (Day 2)	

== Concerts ==
=== Headlining ===
- 2025 Yook Sung Jae Fan Con – The Blue Journey (June 21–22, 2025)
- 2025 Yook Sung Jae Fan Con – The Blue Journey in Hong Kong (July 19, 2025)

== Awards and nominations ==
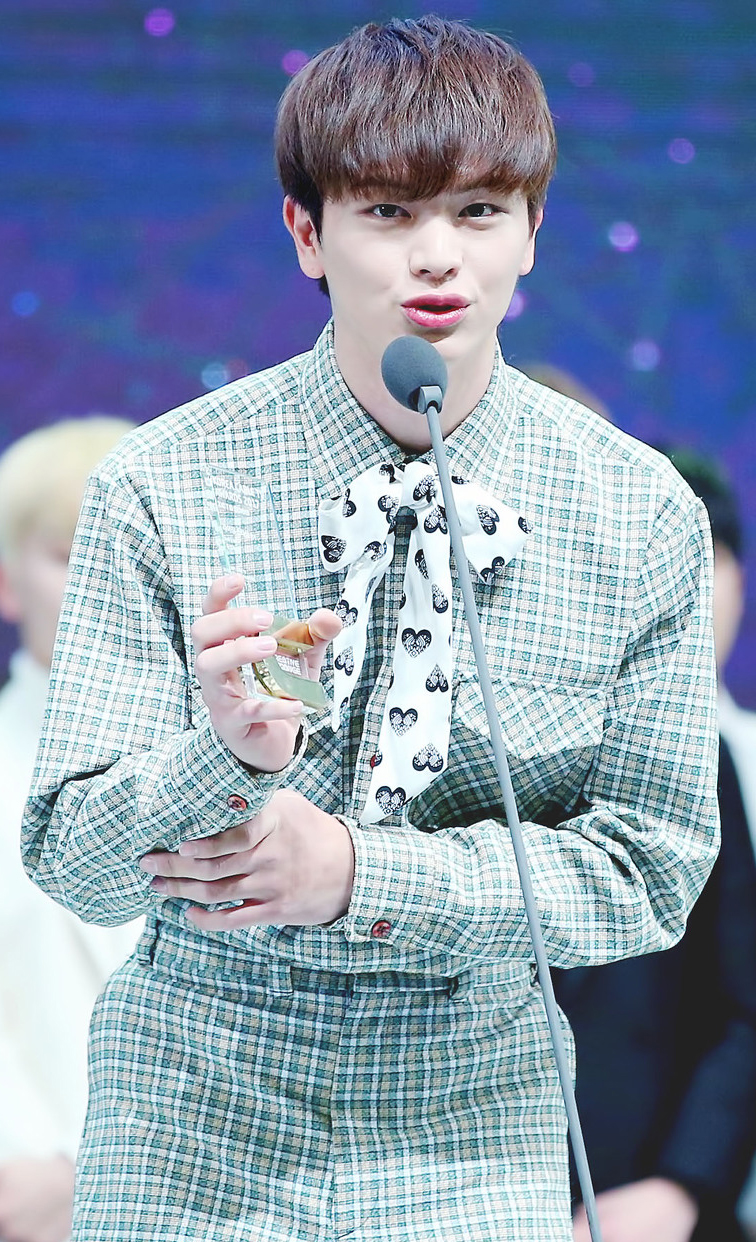
Yook at Korea Cable TV Awards in March 2017

Name of the award ceremony, year presented, category, nominee of the award, and the result of the nomination
Award ceremony	Year	Category	Nominee / Work	Result	Ref.
APAN Star Awards	2015	Best New Actor	Who Are You: School 2015	Nominated	
Baeksang Arts Awards	2016	Best New Actor – Television	Who Are You: School 2015	Nominated	
Baeksang Arts Awards	2017	Most Popular Actor – Television	Guardian: The Lonely and Great God	Nominated	
KBS Drama Awards	2015	Best New Actor	Who Are You: School 2015	Nominated	
KBS Drama Awards	2015	Popularity Award, Actor	Who Are You: School 2015	Nominated	
KBS Drama Awards	2015	Best Couple Award	Yook Sung-jae (with Kim So-hyun); Who Are You: School 2015	Won	
KBS Drama Awards	2017	Drama OST Award	"Ambiguous" (with Seo Eun-kwang and Im Hyun-sik); Fight For My Way OST	Won	
KCA Culture & Entertainment Awards	2025	Viewer’s Choice Actor of the Year (Drama)	The Haunted Palace	Won	
Korea Cable TV Awards	2017	Rising Star Award	Guardian: The Lonely and Great God	Won	
Korea Drama Awards	2015	Best New Actor	Who Are You: School 2015	Nominated	
Korea Drama Awards	2017	Best New Actor	Guardian: The Lonely and Great God	Won	
Korea Drama Awards	2017	Star of the Year Award	Guardian: The Lonely and Great God	Won	
Korea Drama Awards	2025	Top Excellence Award, Actor	The Haunted Palace	Won	
Korea First Brand Awards	2017	Male Acting Idol	Yook Sung-jae	Won	
Korea First Brand Awards	2026	Actor – Drama	Yook Sung-jae	Won	
Korea Brand & Model Awards	2017	Brand Model Grand Prize	Yook Sung-jae	Won	
MBC Drama Awards	2022	Top Excellence Award, Best Actor in a Miniseries	The Golden Spoon	Won	
MBC Drama Awards	2022	Best Couple Award	Yook Sung-jae (with Jung Chae-yeon); The Golden Spoon	Nominated	
MBC Entertainment Awards	2015	Best Male Newcomer Award (Variety)	We Got Married, King of Mask Singer	Won	
MBC Entertainment Awards	2015	Best Couple Award	Yook Sung-jae (with Red Velvet's Joy); We Got Married	Won	
MTN Broadcast Advertising Festival	2018	CF Male Star Award	Yook Sung-jae	Won	
SBS Drama Awards	2015	New Star Award	The Village: Achiara's Secret	Won	
SBS Drama Awards	2025	Top Excellence Award, Actor in a Miniseries Humanity/Fantasy Drama	The Haunted Palace	Won	
SBS Entertainment Awards	2018	Excellent Award Variety Department	Master in the House	Won	
SBS Entertainment Awards	2019	SNS Star Award	Master in the House	Won	
SBS Entertainment Awards	2019	Best Teamwork Award	Master in the House	Won	
Soompi Awards	2016	Best Bromance	Yook Sung-jae (with Nam Joo-hyuk); Who Are You: School 2015	Nominated	
Soompi Awards	2018	Best Idol Actor Award	Guardian: The Lonely and Great God	Nominated	
