= List of songs written and produced by Jung Il-hoon =

Jung Il-hoon is a South Korean rapper, songwriter, record producer, and actor. He was a member of the South Korean boy group BtoB under Cube Entertainment. All credits are adapted from the Korea Music Copyright Association or Melon, unless cited otherwise.

== BtoB Korean albums/singles ==
Year	Album	Song	Lyrics		Music		Arrangement	
Year	Album	Song	Credited	With	Credited	With	Credited	With
2012	Born to Beat	"Born TO Beat"	Yes	Seo Jewoo, Seo Yongbae	Yes	Seo Jewoo, Seo Yongbae	No	—N/a
2012	Born to Beat	"Insane (비밀)"	Yes	Seo Jewoo, Seo Yongbae, Lee Min-hyuk	Yes	Yongbae	No	—
2012	Born to Beat	"Imagine"	Yes	Seo Jewoo, Seo Yongbae,	Yes	Seo Jewoo, Seo Yongbae	No	—
2012	Press Play	"I Only Know Love (사랑밖에 난 몰라)"	Yes	Kim Do-hyun, Seo Yong-bae, Seo Jae-woo	No	—	No	—
2013	Non-album single	"Second Confession"	Yes	Seo Yong-bae, Seo Jae-woo, Lee Min-hyuk	No	—	No	—
2013	Thriller	"Thriller (스릴러)"	Yes	Seo Jae-woo, Seo Yong-bae, Lee Min-hyuk	No	—	No	—
2013	Thriller	"Why (왜 이래)"	No	—	Yes	Lee Gi-kwang, Hyunsik, Lee Min-hyuk, Shin Peniel	No	—
2013	Thriller	"Catch Me"	Yes	Seo Jae-woo, Seo Yong-bae, Lee Minhyuk	No	—	No	—
2013	Thriller	"Like A Crystal" (크리스탈같이)"	Yes	Choi Yong-chan, Lee Min-hyuk, Shin Peniel	No	—	No	—
2013	Thriller	"Star" (별)"	Yes	Lim Hyun-sik, Lee Min-hyuk	No	—	No	—
2014	Beep Beep	"Hello Mello"	Yes	Lee Min-hyuk	Yes	Big SsanCho, Lee Min-hyuk	No	—
2014	Move	"You're So Fly (넌 감동이야)"	Yes	Tenzo and Tasco, Lee Min-hyuk, Shin Peniel	No	—	No	—
2014	Move	"Hope You're Doing Fine (잘 지내겠죠)"	Yes	E.ONE, Lee Min-hyuk	No	—	No	—
2014	Move	"Happening"	Yes	Min Yeon-jae, Lee Min-hyuk, Shin Peniel	No	—	No	—
2014	Move	"You're My Angel (넌 나의 천사)"	Yes	Lee Min-hyuk, Shin Peniel	Yes	—	No	—
2014	Move	"Shake It!"	Yes	Im Hyun-sik	Yes	Im Hyun-sik	Yes	Im Hyun-sik
2014	The Winter's Tale	"The Winter's Tale (울면 안돼)"	Yes	Im Hyun-sik, Lee Min-hyuk, Shin Peniel	Yes	Im Hyun-sik	Yes	Son Yeong-jin, Im Hyunsik
2014	The Winter's Tale	"One Sip (한모금)"	Yes	GOOD LIFE, Lee Min-hyuk, Shin Peniel	No	—	No	—
2014	The Winter's Tale	"Drink! (마셔!)"	Yes	Lee Min-hyuk, Shin Peniel	Yes	Im Hyunsik	Yes	—
2014	The Winter's Tale	"Because It's Christmas (크리스마스 라서)"	Yes	Son Yeong-jin, FERDY, Lee Min-hyuk, Shin Peniel	No	—	No	—
2015	Complete	"It's Okay (괜찮아요)"	Yes	Son Young-jin, Jo Sung-ho, Hong Seung-sung, Lee Min-hyuk	No	—	No	—
2015	Complete	"One Man Show" (북 치고 장구 치고)	Yes	Seo Jae-woo, Seo Yong-bae, Lee Min-hyuk	No	—	No	—
2015	Complete	"My Friend's Girlfriend (친구의 여자친구)"	Yes	Im Hyunsik, Lee Minhyuk	Yes	Im Hyunsik	No	—
2015	Complete	"Her Over Flowers" (꽃보다 그녀)	Yes	Jo Sung-ho, FERDY	No	—	No	—
2015	Complete	"Open"	Yes	Lee Minhyuk, Jerry.L	No	—	No	—
2015	Complete	"Insane (Acoustic Ver.) (비밀 (Acoustic Ver.))"	Yes	Seo Jae-woo, Seo Yong-bae, Lee Min-hyuk	No	—	No	—
2015	Complete	"Everything's Good (Outro)"	Yes	—	Yes	—	Yes	Lim Hyun-sik, Son Young-jin
2015	I Mean	"Heart Attack (심장어택)"	Yes	Seo Jae-woo, Song Yong-bae, Lee Min-hyuk, Shin Peniel	No	—	No	—
2015	I Mean	"Neverland (feat. G.NA)"	Yes	Lee Min-hyuk, Shin Peniel	Yes	—	Yes	—
2015	I Mean	"All Are Wolves Except Me (나 빼고 다 늑대)"	Yes	Seo Jae-woo, Lee Min-hyuk	Yes	Seo Jae-woo	No	—
2016	Remember That	"So Pretty"	Yes	Seo Jae-woo, Seo Yong-bae	No	—	No	—
2016	Remember That	"Empty Space (자리비움)"	Yes	IL	Yes	IL	Yes	IL
2016	New Men	"Pray (I'll Be Your Man)" (기도 (I'll Be Your Man))	Yes	Im Hyun-sik, Lee Min-hyuk, Shin Peniel	No	—	No	—
2016	New Men	"Love Drunk" (취해)	Yes	IL	Yes	IL	Yes	IL
2016	New Men	"I'm Bored" (무료해 (콕 To Me))	Yes	Son Young-jin, Jo Seung-ho, Kang Dong-ha, Lee Minhyuk, Shin Peniel	No	—	No	—
2016	New Men	"Yes I Am"	Yes	Ferdy, Jo Seung-ho, Lee Minhyuk, Shin Peniel	No	—	No	—
2016	New Men	"Come On Over" (놀러와)	Yes	IL, Lee Min-hyuk, Shin Peniel	Yes	IL, Black	Yes	IL
2016	New Men	"Yejiapsa" (예지앞사)	Yes	Seo Eun-kwang, Lee Min-hyuk, Lee Chang-sub, Im Hyun-sik, Shin Peniel, Yook Sung-jae	No	—	No	—
2017	Feel'eM	"Just Say It" (말만 해)	Yes	Im Hyun-sik, Lee Min-hyuk, Shin Peniel, EDEN	No	—	No	—
2017	Feel'eM	"Movie"	Yes	IL, Lee Min-hyuk, Shin Peniel	Yes	IL	Yes	IL
2017	Feel'eM	"About Time"	Yes	Lee Min-hyuk	No	—	No	—
2017	Feel'eM	"Rock N Hiphop" (빨리 뛰어)	Yes	Seo Jae-woo, Kang Dong-ha, Lee Min-hyuk, Shin Peniel	No	—	No	—
2017	Feel'eM	"Someday" (언젠가)	Yes	Im Hyun-sik, Lee Min-hyuk, Shin Peniel	No	—	No	—
2017	Brother Act.	"Missing You" (그리워하다)	Yes	Im Hyun-sik, Lee Min-hyuk, Shin Peniel, EDEN	No	—	No	—
2017	Brother Act.	"My Lady"	Yes	IL, Lee Min-hyuk, Shin Peniel	Yes	IL	Yes	IL
2017	Brother Act.	"Red Lie" (새빨간 거짓말)	Yes	Seo Jae-woo, Ferdy, Lee Min-hyuk, Shin Peniel	No	—	No	—
2017	Brother Act.	"Blowin' up" (신바람)	Yes	Seo Jae-woo, Im Hyun-sik, Lee Min-hyuk, Shin Peniel	Yes	Seo Jae-woo, Im Hyun-sik	No	—
2017	Brother Act.	"Nanana" (나나나)	Yes	Bick Sancho, Jo Seong Ho, Lee Min-hyuk, Shin Peniel	No	—	No	—
2017	Brother Act.	"Dreaming" (꿈에)	Yes	Son Yeong Jin, Jo Seong Ho, Lee Min-hyuk, Shin Peniel	No	—	No	—
2017	Brother Act.	"Guitar (Stroke of Love)"	Yes	Lee Min-hyuk, Shin Peniel	No	—	No	—
2017	Brother Act.	"Running Into Breakup" (이별을 만나다)	Yes	Son Yeong Jin, Jo Seong Ho, Lee Min-hyuk, Shin Peniel	No	—	No	—
2017	Brother Act.	"Fly Away"	Yes	IL, Lee Min-hyuk, Shin Peniel	Yes	IL	Yes	IL
2017	Brother Act.	"Finale : Our Concert" (Finale : 우리들의 콘서트)	Yes	Jo Seong Ho, Ferdy, Lee Min-hyuk, Shin Peniel	No	—	No	—
2018	This Is Us	"Call me"	Yes	IL, Lee Min-hyuk, Shin Peniel	Yes	IL	Yes	IL
2018	This Is Us	"Only one for me" (너 없인 안 된다)	Yes	Im Hyun-sik, EDEN, Lee Min-hyuk, Shin Peniel	No	—	No	—
2018	This Is Us	"Yeah"	Yes	Lee Min-hyuk, Shin Peniel	Yes	Fuxxy, VINCENZO, Any Masingga	No	—
2018	This Is Us	"Blue Moon"	Yes	Lee Min-hyuk, Shin Peniel	No	—	No	—
2018	This Is Us	"IceBreaker"	Yes	Lee Min-hyuk, Shin Peniel	No	—	No	—
2018	This Is Us	"The Feeling"	Yes	Lee Min-hyuk, Shin Peniel	Yes	VINCENZO, Any Masingga, Fuxxy	No	—
2018	Hour Moment	"FRIEND"	Yes	IL, Lee Min-hyuk, Shin Peniel	Yes	IL	Yes	IL
2018	Hour Moment	"Like It"	Yes	Lee Min-hyuk, Shin Peniel	Yes	VINCENZO, Any Masingga, Fuxxy	No	—
2018	Hour Moment	"Butterfly" (나비)	Yes	Lee Min-hyuk, Shin Peniel	Yes	Any Masingga, Fuxxy, VINCENZO	No	—
2018	Hour Moment	"Climax" (제발)	Yes	Lee Min-hyuk, Shin Peniel	No	—	No	—
2018	Hour Moment	"Beautiful Pain" (아름답고도 아프구나)	Yes	Im Hyun-sik, EDEN, Lee Min-hyuk, Shin Peniel	No	—	No	—

== BtoB Japanese albums/singles ==
Year	Album	Song	Lyrics		Music		Arrangement	
Year	Album	Song	Credited	With	Credited	With	Credited	With
2015	Non-album singles	"夏色 MY GIRL" (Natsuiro MY GIRL)	Yes	Tada Shinya, Lee Min-hyuk, Shin Peniel	No	—	No	—
2015	Non-album singles	"Repeat Goodbye" (サヨナラを繰り返して)	Yes	Taira yoshitaka, Lee Min-hyuk, Shin Peniel	No	—	No	—
2016	Non-album singles	"Dear Bride"	Yes	Kelly, Lee Min-hyuk, Shin Peniel	No	—	No	—
2016	Non-album singles	"Because We Can Meet Again" (また会えるから)	Yes	Kelly, Lee Min-hyuk, Shin Peniel	No	—	No	—
2016	Non-album singles	"Always and Forever" (ずっとずっと)	Yes	Tada Shinya, Lee Min-hyuk, Shin Peniel	No	—	No	—
2016	Non-album singles	"L.U.V"	Yes	DaisyI, Lee Min-hyuk, Shin Peniel	No	—	No	—
2016	Non-album singles	"Go for it"	Yes	Tada Shinya, Lee Min-hyuk, Shin Peniel	No	—	No	—
2016	Non-album singles	"Beyond the Time"	Yes	MOKU, Lee Min-hyuk, Shin Peniel	No	—	No	—
2016	24 / 7	"Hello Mello"	No	—	Yes	Big SsanCho, Lee Min-hyuk	No	—
2016	24 / 7	"Ha-Na-Bi"	Yes	Tada Shinya	No	—	No	—
2016	24 / 7	Mirai (Ashita)	Yes	Tada Shinya	No	—	No	—
2016	24 / 7	"Second Confession" (二度目の告白)	Yes	Seo Yong-bae, Seo Jae-woo, Lee Min-hyuk	No	—	No	—
2016	24 / 7	"Imasugukokodekisswoshiyouyo" (今すぐここでKISSを交わそうよ)	Yes	Kelly, Lee Min-hyuk, Shin Peniel	No	—	No	—
2016	24 / 7	"Lemonade" (レモネード)	Yes	DaisyI, Lee Min-hyuk, Shin Peniel	No	—	No	—
2016	24 / 7	"Christmas Time ～For You～" (Christmas Time ～君だけを～)	Yes	Tada Shinya, Lee Min-hyuk, Shin Peniel	No	—	No	—
2017	Non-album single	"Movie"	No	—	Yes	IL	Yes	IL

== Other works by BtoB ==
Year	Album	Song	Lyrics	
Year	Album	Song	Credited	With
2015	Sweet, Savage Family OST	"Goodbye Sadness"	Yes	Kim Yoo-kyung
2016	Tele Monster Animation OST	"Come With Eerie (이리와)"	Yes	OK,GO, Lee Min-hyuk, Shin Peniel
2016	Cinderella and Four Knights OST	"For You"	Yes	Kim Jin-ah, Lee Min-hyuk
2016	The Miracle OST	"Voice"	Yes	Seo Ui-beom, Jo Sung-cheon, BPM, Lee Min-hyuk, Shin Peniel
2019	My Absolute Boyfriend OST	"It Was Love"	Yes	Bang Min-ah

== Solo work ==
Year	Album	Song	Lyrics		Music	
Year	Album	Song	Credited	With	Credited	With
2017	Non-album single	"Fancy Shoes"	Yes	—N/a	Yes	Dailydose
2018	"Big Wave"	"Come Closer (feat Im Hyunsik of BTOB)"	Yes	John Napoleon, Elapse	Yes	John Napoleon, Elapse & VINCENZO
2018	"Big Wave"	"Fancy shoes remastered ver."	Yes	—N/a	Yes	VINCENZO, John Napoleon, Fuxxy, Any Masingga & Elapse
2018	"Big Wave"	"She's Gone"	Yes	—N/a	Yes	VINCENZO, Any Masingga & Fuxxy
2018	"Big Wave"	"Big Wave"	Yes	—N/a	Yes	VINCENZO, Fuxxy & Any Masingga
2018	"Big Wave"	"Always (feat Jinho of Pentagon)"	Yes	Seo Jaewoo	Yes	Seo Jaewoo
2019	Non-album single	"Spoiler (Feat Babylon)"	Yes	Babylon	Yes	Babylon, Fuxxy, VINCENZO, Any Masingga
2024	TBA	"Lullaby"	Yes	kama, Ya-wa	Yes	kama, Ya-wa, Alawn
2025	TBA	"moonwalk"	Yes	Illusion	Yes	Illusion

== Other artists ==
Year	Album	Artist	Song	Lyrics		Music	
Year	Album	Artist	Song	Credited	With	Credited	With
2012	Melting	Hyuna	"Unripe Apple (풋사과)"	Yes	Seo Yong-bae, Seo Jae-woo	No	—
2013	Beautiful Kisses	G.NA	"Oops!"	Yes	Son Young-jin, Im Sang-hyuk	No	—
2014	B.B.B	Subin	"Just Pass By (그냥 지나가)"	Yes	Subin	No	—
2015	First Love	CLC	"Cafe Mocha Please (카페모카 주세요)"	Yes	—	No	—
2015	First Love	CLC	"Open The Window (창문을 열고)"	Yes	Seo Jae-woo, Seo Yong-bae	No	—
2015	Question	CLC	"Hide & Seek (숨바꼭질)"	Yes	—	No	—
2015	A+	Hyuna	"Roll Deep (잘나가서 그래)"	Yes	Seo Jae-woo, Big Sancho, Son Young-jin	No	—
2015	A+	Hyuna	"Get Out Of My House (내 집에서 나가)"	Yes	Big Sancho, Kwon Jungyeol	Yes	Big Sancho, Kwon Jungyeol
2015	Unpretty Rapstar 2 Semi-Final Part 1	Jeon Ji-yoon	"This Ain't Me (바꾸지마)"	Yes	Jeon Ji-yoon	No	—
2016	Refresh	CLC	"Friend Lover Zone 오빠친구"	Yes	—	No	—
2016	2016 United Cube Project Part 1	HyunA, Jang Hyun-seung, BtoB, Roh Ji-hoon, CLC, Pentagon	"Special Christmas"	Yes	Hong Seung-song, Big Ssancho, Jo Seung-ho, Kang Dong-ha, Hyuna, Lee Min-hyuk, Peniel, Jang Ye-eun, E'Dawn, Yuto, Wooseok	No	—
2017	Kiss on the Lips	Melody Day	"You Seem Busy (바빠 보여요)"	Yes	Polar Bear, JQ, Kim Jun-oh, Ahn Young-ju, Choi Ji-hye, Kim Jin-ju	No	—
2017	Ceremony	Pentagon	"Beautiful"	Yes	IL	Yes	IL
2017	Non-album single	Jisook, Ilhoon	"Baesisi (배시시)"	Yes	Kim Gun Woo, Kim Dang, Yeong Seo	No	—
2018	Non-album release	My9Beauty	"Hush"	Yes	Kamen Rider	Yes	Kamen Rider
2018	Obvious	Hwanhee	"Obvious (뻔해)"	Yes	Bull$EyE, real-fantasy	No	—
2018	One	Samuel	"One"	Yes	Brave Brothers, Chakun	No	—
2018	ONE	HyunA, Jo Kwon, BtoB, CLC, Pentagon, (G)I-dle	"Upgrade"	Yes	—	Yes	VINCENZO, Any Masingga, Fuxxy
2018	ONE	Lee Min-Hyuk, Peniel, Jung Il-Hoon (BtoB), Jang Yeeun (CLC), Wooseok (Pentagon), Jeon So-yeon ((G)I-dle)	"Mermaid"	Yes	Lee Min-Hyuk, Peniel, Jang Yeeun, Wooseok, Jeon So-yeon	No	—
2018	Non-album single	U Sung-eun	"Hug me (끌어안아줘)"	Yes	U Seung-eun, Sofar	No	—
2018	DO n DO	Lee Hong-gi	"COOKIES"	Yes	Lee Hong-gi, IL	Yes	Lee Hong-gi, IL
2018	Non-album single	Babylon	"Remember (그리운 건 그때 그대)"	Yes	Babylon	No	—
2020	Yook O'Clock	Yook Sung-jae	"HMHN (할많하않)"	Yes	—	Yes	Fuxxy, VINCENZO, Amy Masingga
2025	Universe League – WAR (We Are Ready)	Universe League – Team Groove	"Universe"	Yes	Son Young-jin, Yeah Nice, Ferdy, JayJay	No	Son Young-jin, Yeah Nice, Ferdy, JayJay
