= List of songs recorded by BtoB =

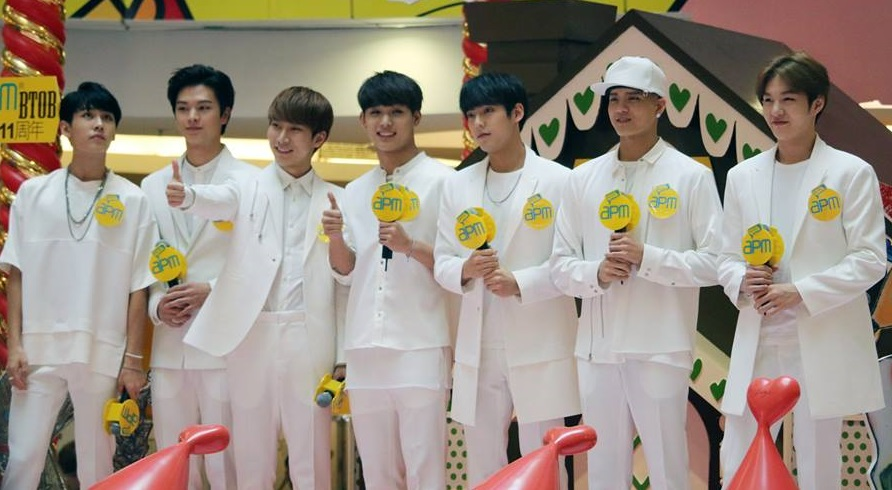
BtoB in September, 2015

These are the complete list of songs by the South Korean boy group BtoB.

Key
	Single
	Pre-release single
•	Song available in Korean and Japanese

== 0-9 ==
Song	Writer			Album/Single	Language	Year	Ref.
Song	Lyrics	Composition	Arrangement	Album/Single	Language	Year	Ref.
"1,2,3"				This Is Us	Korean	2018	
"2nd Confession" •	Seo Yong-bae; Seo Jae-woo; Lee Min-hyuk; Ilhoon	Seo Yong-bae; Seo Jae-woo	Seo Yong-bae; Seo Jae-woo	Digital Single	Korean	2012	
"2nd Confession"				24/7 (Twenty-Four Seven)	Japanese	2016	

== A ==
Song	Writer			Album/Single	Language	Year	Ref.
Song	Lyrics	Composition	Arrangement	Album/Single	Language	Year	Ref.
"About Time"	Lee Min-hyuk; Jung Ilhoon	Minhyuk; Jung Ilhoon; Wynn; Jerry.L (MAJORIG)		Feel'eM	Korean	2017	
"All Are Wolves Except Me" (나 빼고 다 늑대)	Seo Jae-woo; Ilhoon; Minhyuk	Seo Jae-woo; Ilhoon	Seo Jaewoo	I Mean	Korean	2015	
"ずっとずっと" (Always and Forever)				Dear Bride	Japanese	2016	
"Anymore"	Hyunsik	Seo Jae-woo; Lee Brian D		Remember That	Korean	2016	

== B ==
Song	Writer			Album/Single	Language	Year	Ref.
Song	Lyrics	Composition	Arrangement	Album/Single	Language	Year	Ref.
"Beautiful Pain" (아름답고도 아프구나)	Hyunsik EDEN Minhyuk Peniel Ilhoon	Hyunsik EDEN		Hour Moment	Korean	2018	
"Because It's Christmas" (크리스마스라서)	Son Yeong-jin; FERDY; Ilhoon; Minhyuk; Peniel	Son Yeong-jin; FERDY	Seo Jae-woo	The Winter's Tale	Korean	2014	
"Because Like You" (너 같아서)	Jeon Da-woon; Big Sancho			Remember That	Korean	2016	
"また会えるから" (Because We Can Meet Again)				Dear Bride	Japanese	2016	
"Beep Beep" (뛰뛰빵빵)	Brave Brothers	Brave Brothers; Elephant Kingdom	Brave Brothers; Elephant Kingdom; Lee Jung-min	Beep Beep	Korean	2014	
"Beyond the Time"				L.U.V	Japanese	2016	
"Beyond the Time"				24/7 (Twenty-Four Seven)	Japanese	2016	
"Blowin'"				Summer Color My Girl	Japanese	2015	
"Blowin' Up" (신바람)	Seo Jae-woo; Hyunsik; Minhyuk; Ilhoon; Peniel	Seo Jae-woo; Hyunsik; Ilhoon	Seo Jae-woo	Brother Act.	Korean	2017	
"Blue Moon"	Minhyuk Peniel Ilhoon	Minhyuk Yang Seung-wook Yoon Gook-hyun	Yang Seung-wook Yoon Gook-hyun	This Is Us	Korean	2018	
"Born To Beat"	Seo Jae-woo; Seo Yong-bae; Ilhoon		Seo Jae-woo; Seo Yong-bae	Born to Beat	Korean	2012	
"どんな未来を" (Brand New Days)				Brand new days ~どんな未来を~	Japanese	2018	
"Broken Heart" (끝난 건가요)	Lee Chang-geun; Lee Seung-woo	Lee Kyu-hoon	Lee Kyu-hoon; Song Young-min; Lee Ki-yong	Beep Beep	Korean	2014	
"Butterfly" (나비)	Ilhoon Minhyuk Peniel	Ilhoon Any Masingga Fuxxy VINCENZO	Any Masingga	Hour Moment	Korean	2018	

== C ==
Song	Writer			Album/Single	Language	Year	Ref.
Song	Lyrics	Composition	Arrangement	Album/Single	Language	Year	Ref.
"Call Me"	Ilhoon IL Minhyuk Peniel	Ilhoon IL		This Is Us	Korean	2018	
"Catch Me"	Seo Jae-woo; Seo Yong-bae; Minhyuk; Ilhoon	Seo Jae-woo; Seo Yong-bae	Seo Jae-woo; Seo Yong-bae; Minhyuk; Ilhoon	Thriller	Korean	2013	
"Christmas Time ~Only You~"				24/7 (Twenty-Four Seven)	Japanese	2016	
"Climax" (제발)	Minhyuk Peniel Ilhoon	Minhyuk Yang Seung-wook Kannoo	Yang Seung-wook Kannoo	Hour Moment	Korean	2018	
"Come On Over" (놀러와)	Ilhoon; IL; Minhyuk; Peniel	Ilhoon; IL; Black	Ilhoon; IL	New Men	Korean	2016	
"Complete (Intro)"	E.ONE			Complete	Korean	2015	
"Crush On You"				Brand new days ~どんな未来を~	Japanese	2018	

== D ==
Song	Writer			Album/Single	Language	Year	Ref.
Song	Lyrics	Composition	Arrangement	Album/Single	Language	Year	Ref.
"Dear Bride"				Dear Bride	Japanese	2016	
"Drawing (The Picture I Drew)" (그려본다 (내가 그린 그림))	77어린이	BreadBeat (Tenten); Shin-hyo; Wonderkid		Remember That	Korean	2016	
"Dreaming" (꿈에)	Son Young-jin; Jo Sung-ho; Minhyuk; Ilhoon; Peniel	Son Young-jin; Jo Sung-ho		Brother Act.	Korean	2017	
"Drink!" (마쎠)	Ilhoon; Minhyuk; Peniel	Ilhoon; Hyunsik	Ilhoon	The Winter's Tale	Korean	2014	

== E ==
Song	Writer			Album/Single	Language	Year	Ref.
Song	Lyrics	Composition	Arrangement	Album/Single	Language	Year	Ref.
"Empty Spaces" (자리비움)	Ilhoon; IL			Remember That	Korean	2016	
"Everything's Good (Outro)" (Ilhoon Solo)	Ilhoon		Ilhoon; Hyunsik; Son Youngjin	Complete	Korean	2015	
"Evidence'"				Summer Color My Girl	Japanese	2015	

== F ==
Song	Writer			Album/Single	Language	Year	Ref.
Song	Lyrics	Composition	Arrangement	Album/Single	Language	Year	Ref.
"Father" 아버지	Seo Je-woo; Seo Yong-bae			Born To Beat	Korean	2012	
"Finale: Our Concert" (우리들의 콘서트)	Jo Sung-ho; FERDY; Minhyuk; Ilhoon; Peniel	Jo Sung-ho; FERDY		Brother Act.	Korean	2017	
"Flower"				MOVIE	Japanese	2017	
"Fly Away"	Ilhoon; IL; Minhyuk; Peniel	Ilhoon; IL		Brother Act.	Korean	2017	
"Friend"	Ilhoon IL Minhyuk Peniel	Ilhoon IL	IL Ilhoon	Hour Moment	Korean	2018	
"Future Rise"				Brand new days ~どんな未来を~	Japanese	2018	
"未来(あした)" (Future (Tomorrow); 未来(あした); Mirai (Ashita)) •				Future (Tomorrow)	Japanese	2015	
"未来(あした)" (Future (Tomorrow); 未来(あした); Mirai (Ashita))				24/7 (Twenty-Four Seven)	Japanese	2016	

== G ==
Song	Writer			Album/Single	Language	Year	Ref.
Song	Lyrics	Composition	Arrangement	Album/Single	Language	Year	Ref.
"Giddy Up" (어기여차 디여차)	Seo Jae-woo; Big Sancho; CAESAR & LOUI; Minhyuk	Seo Jae-woo; Big Sancho; CAESAR & LOUI		Complete	Korean	2015	
"Go For It"				L.U.V	Japanese	2016	
"Guess Who's Back"				24/7 (Twenty-Four Seven)	Japanese	2016	
"Guitar" (Stroke of Love)	Minhyuk; Ilhoon; Peniel	Minhyuk; Yang Seung-wook; DJ AIN	Yang Seung-wook; DJ AIN	Brother Act.	Korean	2017	

== H ==
Song	Writer			Album/Single	Language	Year	Ref.
Song	Lyrics	Composition	Arrangement	Album/Single	Language	Year	Ref.
"Ha Na Bi"				24/7 (Twenty-Four Seven)	Japanese	2016	
"Happening"	Min Yeon-jae; Minhyuk; Ilhoon; Peniel	Seo Jae-woo; Brian Lee	Seo Jae-woo	Move	Korean	2014	
"Heart Attack" (심장어택)	Seo Jae-woo; Song Yong-bae; Minhyuk; Ilhoon; Peniel	Seo Jae-woo; Song Yong-bae	Seo Jae-woo	I Mean	Korean	2015	
"Hello" (여보세요)	Team One Sound			Beep Beep	Korean	2014	
"Hello Mello" •	Ilhoon; Minhyuk	Ilhoon; Minhyuk; Big Sancho	Seo Jae-woo; Big Sancho	Beep Beep	Korean	2014	
"Hello Mello" •	Ilhoon; Minhyuk			24/7 (Twenty-Four Seven)	Japanese	2016	
"Her Over Flowers" (꽃보다 그녀)	Jo Sung-ho; FERDY; Ilhoon	Jo Sung-ho; FERDY		Complete	Korean	2015	
"Hope You're Doing Fine" (잘 지내겠죠)	E.ONE; Minhyuk; Ilhoon	E.ONE		Move	Korean	2014	

== I ==
Song	Writer			Album/Single	Language	Year	Ref.
Song	Lyrics	Composition	Arrangement	Album/Single	Language	Year	Ref.
"I Don't Know" (몰라)	Hyunsik			Move	Korean	2014	
"I Miss You" (보고파)	Hyunsik			Complete	Korean	2015	
"I Only Know Love" (사랑밖에 난 몰라)	Kim Do-hyun; Seo Yong-bae; Seo Jae-woo; Ilhoon	Kim Do-hyun; Seo Yong-bae; Seo Jae-woo		Press Play	Korean	2012	
"I'll Be Here" (여기 있을게)	Hyunsik; EDEN		Megatone	I Mean	Korean	2015	
"IceBreaker"	Minhyuk Peniel Ilhoon	Kairos SamUIL	Kairos SamUIL WESKOZ K.O	This Is Us	Korean	2018	
"Insane" (비밀)	Seo Jae-woo; Seo Yong-bae; Ilhoon; Minhyuk	Seo Jae-woo; Seo Yong-bae; Ilhoon	Seo Jae-woo; Seo Yong-bae	Born To Beat	Korean	2012	
"Interlude: Brother Act."	—N/a			Brother Act.	Korean	2017	
"Imagine"	Seo Jewoo; Seo Yongbae; Ilhoon		Seo Jewoo; Seo Yongbae	Born To Beat	Korean	2012	
"Irresistible Lips" (그 입술을 뺏었어)	Wheesung	Seo Je-woo; Seo Yong-bae		Born To Beat	Korean	2012	
"It's Okay" (괜찮아요)	Son Young-jin; Jo Sung-ho; Hong Seung-sung; Minhyuk; Ilhoon	Son Young-jin; Jo Sung-ho		Complete	Korean	2015	

== J ==
Song	Writer			Album/Single	Language	Year	Ref.
Song	Lyrics	Composition	Arrangement	Album/Single	Language	Year	Ref.
"Jump"				L.U.V	Japanese	2016	
"Just Say It" (말만 해)	Hyunsik; Minhyuk; Peniel; Ilhoon; EDEN	Hyunsik; EDEN		Feel'eM	Korean	2017	

== K ==
Song	Writer			Album/Single	Language	Year	Ref.
Song	Lyrics	Composition	Arrangement	Album/Single	Language	Year	Ref.
"Killing Me"	Hyunsik; Changsub	Hyunsik; Simon Hassle; Benjamin Beard		Remember That	Korean	2016	

== L ==
Song	Writer			Album/Single	Language	Year	Ref.
Song	Lyrics	Composition	Arrangement	Album/Single	Language	Year	Ref.
"Last Day"	Changsub; Seo Jae-woo	Seo Jae-woo; Jussifer; Davion Farris of The Pensouls; Joe J. Lee "Kairos"	Seo Jae-woo	I Mean	Korean	2015	
"Like A Crystal" (크리스탈같이)	Choi Yong-chan; Minhyuk; Peniel; IlHoon	Choi Yong-chan		Thriller	Korean	2013	
"Like It"	Ilhoon Minhyuk Peniel	Ilhoon VINCENZO Any Masingga Fuxxy	Any Masingga VINCENZO	Hour Moment	Korean	2018	
"Live Well Yourself" (너나 잘 살아)	Big Sancho; Socrates	Seo Jae-woo		Complete	Korean	2015	
"L.U.V"				L.U.V	Japanese	2016	
"Love Drunk" 취해	Ilhoon; IL			New Men	Korean	2016	
"レモネード" Lemonade (레모네이드)	N/A			24/7 (Twenty-Four Seven)	Japanese	2016	

== M ==
Song	Writer			Album/Single	Language	Year	Ref.
Song	Lyrics	Composition	Arrangement	Album/Single	Language	Year	Ref.
"MAGIC TIME"				Future (Tomorrow)	Japanese	2015	
"Missing You" (그리워하다)	Hyunsik; EDEN; Minhyuk; Ilhoon; Peniel	Hyunsik; EDEN		Brother Act.	Korean	2017	
"Monday To Sunday"	Dru Scott; Fredrik Thomander; Jörgen Elofsson			Born To Beat	Korean	2012	
"Movie" •	Ilhoon; IL; Minhyuk; Peniel	Ilhoon; IL	IL; Ilhoon	Feel'eM	Korean	2017	
"Movie" •				MOVIE	Japanese	2017	
"My Friend's Girlfriend" (친구의 여자친구)	Ilhoon; Hyunsik; Minhyuk	Ilhoon; Hyunsik	Seo Jae-woo	Complete	Korean	2015	
"My Girl" (feat. G.NA)	Triple A			Press Play	Korean	2012	
"My Lady"	Ilhoon; IL; Minhyuk; Peniel	Ilhoon; IL		Brother Act.	Korean	2017	

== N ==
Song	Writer			Album/Single	Language	Year	Ref.
Song	Lyrics	Composition	Arrangement	Album/Single	Language	Year	Ref.
"Nanana" (나나나)	Big Sancho; Jo Sung-ho; Minhyuk; Ilhoon; Peniel	Big Sancho; Jo Sung-ho		Brother Act.	Korean	2017	
"夏色 MY GIRL" (Natsuiro MY GIRL)				Summer Color My Girl	Japanese	2015	
"Never Ending (Melody)" (끝나지 않을 (Melody))	Hyunsik; Changsub; Eunkwang		Seo Jae-woo	Beep Beep	Korean	2014	
"Neverland" (feat. G.NA)	Ilhoon; Minhyuk; Peniel	Ilhoon		I Mean	Korean	2015	
"New Men"	Hyunsik			New Men	Korean	2016	

== O ==
Song	Writer			Album/Single	Language	Year	Ref.
Song	Lyrics	Composition	Arrangement	Album/Single	Language	Year	Ref.
"One Man Show" (북 치고 장구 치고)	Seo Jae-woo; Seo Yong-bae; Minhyuk; Ilhoon	Seo Jae-woo; Seo Yong-bae		Complete	Korean	2015	
"One Sip" (한 모금)	GOOD LIFE; Minhyuk; Ilhoon; Peniel	GOOD LIFE		The Winter's Tale	Korean	2014	
"Only One For Me" (너 없인 안 된다))	Hyunsik EDEN Minhyuk Peniel Ilhoon	Hyunsik EDEN		This Is Us	Korean	2018	

== P ==
Song	Writer			Album/Single	Language	Year	Ref.
Song	Lyrics	Composition	Arrangement	Album/Single	Language	Year	Ref.
"Pray (I'll Be Your Man)" (기도 (I'll Be Your Man))	Hyunsik; Minhyuk; Peniel; Ilhoon	Hyunsik; EDEN; NATHAN		New Men	Korean	2016	
"Prelude: A Day" (하루)	—N/a	Hyunsik	—N/a	Brother Act.	Korean	2017	

== R ==
Song	Writer			Album/Single	Language	Year	Ref.
Song	Lyrics	Composition	Arrangement	Album/Single	Language	Year	Ref.
"Red Lie" (새빨간 거짓말)	Seo Jae-woo; FEFDY; Hyunsik; Minhyuk; Ilhoon; Peniel	Seo Jae-woo; FERDY; Hyunsik	Seo Jae-woo; FERDY	Brother Act.	Korean	2017	
"Regrets Of Love"				Future (Tomorrow)	Japanese	2015	
"Remember That" (봄날의 기억)	Jo Sung-ho; FERDY			Remember That	Korean	2016	
"サヨナラを繰り返して" (Repeat Goodbye)				Summer Color My Girl	Japanese	2015	
"Rock n Hiphop" (빨리 뛰어)	Seo Jae-woo; Kang Dong-ha; Minhyuk; Peniel; Ilhoon	Seo Jae-woo; Kang Dong-ha; Devine Channel	Seo Jae-woo; Kang Dong-ha	Feel'eM	Korean	2017	
"Running Into Breakup" (이별을 만나다)	Son Young-jin; Jo Sung-ho; Minhyuk; Ilhoon; Peniel	Son Young-jin; Jo Sung-ho; Hyunsik	Son Young-jin; Jo Sung-ho	Brother Act.	Korean	2017	

== S ==
Song	Writer			Album/Single	Language	Year	Ref.
Song	Lyrics	Composition	Arrangement	Album/Single	Language	Year	Ref.
"桜色" (Sakurairo)"				Future (Tomorrow)	Japanese	2015	
"See You Again"				24/7 (Twenty-Four Seven)	Japanese	2016	
"Shake It"	Hyunsik; Ilhoon			Complete	Korean	2015	
"涙色の空" (Sky's Tears)				Dear Bride	Japanese	2016	
"Snow Light Road" (Changsub solo)				24/7 (Twenty-Four Seven)	Japanese	2016	
"So Pretty" (봄날의 기억)	Seo Jae-woo; Seo Yong-bae; Ilhoon	Seo Jae-woo; Seo Yong-bae		Remember That	Korean	2016	
"Someday" (언젠가) •	Hyunsik; Minhyuk; Peniel; Ilhoon; EDEN	Hyunsik	Hyunsik; Son Young-jin	Feel'eM	Korean	2017	
"Someday" (언젠가) •				MOVIE	Japanese	2017	
"Sorry" (Song by Eunkwang, Changsub, Minhyuk)	Minhyuk	Minhyuk; Yang Seung-wook; Kkannu	Yang Seung-wook; Kkannu	Digital single	Korean	2019	
"Stand By Me" (내 곁어 서 있어줘) (Note: "Stand By Be" is BtoB Blue's debut title track.)	Black Eyed Pilseung; Hyunsik			Digital Single	Korean	2016	
"Star" (별)	Hyunsik; Ilhoon; Minhyuk	Hyunsik	Kim Tae-ho; Son Young-jin	Thriller	Korean	2013	
"Stand Up"	Gum	Choi Yong-chan		Press Play	Korean	2012	
"Summer Romance"	Big Sancho; FERDY; Hyunsik		Big Sancho; FERDY	Complete	Korean	2015	

== T ==
Song	Writer			Album/Single	Language	Year	Ref.
Song	Lyrics	Composition	Arrangement	Album/Single	Language	Year	Ref.
"Thriller" (스릴러)	Seo Jae-woo; Seo Yong-bae; Minhyuk; Ilhoon	Seo Jae-woo; Seo Yong-bae		Thriller	Korean	2013	
"The Winter's Tale" (울면 안 돼)	Hyunsik; Ilhoon; Minhyuk; Peniel	Hyunsik; Ilhoon	Son Yeong-jin; Hyunsik; Ilhoon	The Winter's Tale	Korean	2014	
"The Feeling" (너 없인 안 된다)	Ilhoon Minhyuk Peniel	Ilhoon VINCENZO Any Masingga Fuxxy	VINCENZO Any Masingga	This Is Us	Korean	2018	
"Twilight"				Brand new days ~どんな未来を~	Japanese	2018	

== U ==
Song	Writer			Album/Single	Language	Year	Ref.
Song	Lyrics	Composition	Arrangement	Album/Single	Language	Year	Ref.
"U & I"	Hwang Sung-jin	Lee Joo-hyung; Lim Sang-hyuk		Press Play	Korean	2012	
"Unforgettable"				MOVIE	Japanese	2017	

== W ==
Song	Writer			Album/Single	Language	Year	Ref.
Song	Lyrics	Composition	Arrangement	Album/Single	Language	Year	Ref.
"Way Back Home" (집으로 가는 길)	Son Yeong-jin; Jo Sung-ho			I Mean	Korean	2015	
"When I Was Your Man" (내가 니 남자였을 때)	Park Woo-sung; Sora	Park Woo-sung		Thriller	Korean	2013	
"When It Rains" (비가 내리면) (Note: "When It Rains" is released as BtoB Blue's digital single.)	Hyunsik			Digital Single	Korean	2018	
"Why" (왜이래)	Lee Gi-kwang; Hyunsik; Minhyuk; Peniel; Ilhoon	Lee Gi-kwang; Hyunsik	Shinsadong Tiger	Thriller	Korean	2013	
"WOW" •	Kim Do-hyun; Seo Yong-bae; Seo Jae-woo			Press Play	Korean	2012	
"WOW" •	Kim Do-hyun; Seo Yong-bae; Seo Jae-woo			24/7 (Twenty-Four Seven)	Japanese	2016	

== Y ==
Song	Writer			Album/Single	Language	Year	Ref.
Song	Lyrics	Composition	Arrangement	Album/Single	Language	Year	Ref.
"Yeah" (너 없인 안 된다)	Ilhoon Minhyuk Peniel	Ilhoon Fuxxy VINCENZO Any Masingga	Fuxxy	This Is Us	Korean	2018	
"Yejiapsa" (Now The Future Pass Of This Love; 예지앞사)	Eunkwang; Minhyuk; Changsub; Hyunsik; Peniel; Ilhoon; Sungjae	Kairos; Jesper Borgen	Kairos; Jesper Borgen; Wes Koz	New Men	Korean	2016	
"Yes I Am"	FERDY; Jo Seung-ho; Ilhoon; Minhyuk; Peniel	FERDY; Jo Seung-ho		New Men	Korean	2016	
"You Can Cry" (울어도 돼)	Jerry L. Han Hee-jun; Minhyuk; Ilhoon	Jerry L. Han Hee-jun	Jerry L.	The Winter's Tale	Korean	2014	
"You're My Angel" (넌 나의 천사) (feat. JOO)	Ilhoon; Minhyuk; Peniel	Ilhoon	Son Youngjin; Big Sancho	Move	Korean	2014	
"You're So Fly" (넌 감동이야)	Tenzo and Tasco; Minhyuk; Ilhoon; Peniel	Tenzo and Tasco		Move	Korean	2014	

== Other songs ==
Song	Artists	Writer(s)	Album	Year	Ref.
"Love Virus" (사랑병)	Btob (with U Sung-eun)		Digital single	2012	
"Be Alright"	Changsub (with Yoseob, G.NA, Gayoon)		Road for Hope OST	2012	
"Bye Bye Love"	Changsub, Jung Il-hoon (with Yoseob, Dongwoon)		When a Man Falls in Love OST Part 4	2013	
"Last Days" (지난 날)	Changsub, Lee Min-hyuk, Hyunsik, Sungjae (with Junhyung, Ha Yeon-soo)		Monstar OST	2013	
"After Time Passes" (시간이 흐른 뒤엔)	Changsub, Lee Min-hyuk, Hyunsik, Sungjae (with Junhyung, Ha Yeon-soo)		Monstar OST	2013	
"First Love" (첫사랑)	Changsub, Lee Min-hyuk, Hyunsik, Sungjae (with Junhyung, Ha Yeon-soo)		Monstar OST	2013	
"Christmas Song" (크리스마스 노래)	BtoB (with BEAST, 4Minute, G.NA, Roh Ji Hoon, Kim Kiri, Shin Ji-hoon, Apink, Huh Gak)		Cube Artist Christmas Song	2013	
"Small Moon" (궁금해)	Eunkwang (with Heo Ga-yoon, Yang Yo-seob, Shin Ji-hoon, Ryu Hyun-jin)		Ryu-Cube Donation Project (류-큐브 기부 프로젝트)	2014	
"Back in the Days" (그때 그날처럼)	Eunkwang	범이, 낭이	Cube Voice Project Part 2	2014	
"Curious" (궁금해)	Sungjae (with Oh Seung-hee (CLC))		Plus Nine Boys OST Part 4	2014	
"I Miss You" (with Mi Yoo)	Eunkwang		Mask OST	2015	
"Love Song"	Sungjae (feat. Park Hye-soo)		Who Are You: School 2015 OST Part 8	2015	
"Loving You Again"	Sungjae		Scholar Who Walks The Night OST Part 3	2015	
"Goodbye Sadness"	Eunkwang, Changsub, Ilhoon		Sweet, Savage Family OST Part 1	2015	
"Fingertips Love" (손끝의 사랑)	Eunkwang, Changsub (with B1A4, Heo Young-ji, A-JAX, April, Oh My Girl, Kassy)	이태열, 이한길	Fingertips Love	2016	
"After the Play Ends" (연극이 끝난 후)	Changsub, Minhyuk (with Elkie)		After the Play Ends OST	2016	
"For You"	Eunkwang, Minhyuk, Changsub, Ilhoon		Cinderella and Four Knights OST Part 1	2016	
"Special Christmas"	BtoB (with Jang Hyun-seung, Kim Hyun-ah, Roh Ji Hoon, CLC, Pentagon)		2016 United Cube Project Part 1	2016	
"Voice"	BtoB		The Miracle OST Part 3	2016	
"Ambiguous"	Eunkwang, Hyunsik, Sungjae	August08, Key U, Wild Boar	Fight for My Way OST Part 4	2017	
"What's On Your Mind?"	Changsub		My Friend's Love Life OST	2017	
"Dreaming of Spring (Winter Sleep)"	Eunkwang		Queen of Mystery 2 OST Part 4	2018	
"Falling"	Changsub		A Poem a Day OST Part 5	2018	
"Upgrade"	BtoB	Ilhoon, VINCENZO, Any Masingga, 퍽시(Fuxxy)	ONE	2018	
"Mermaid"	BtoB	Minhyuk, Peniel, Ilhoon, Yeeun (CLC), Wooseok (Pentagon), Soyeon ((G)I-dle), Yummy Tone	ONE	2018	
"Follow Your Dreams" (한걸음)	BtoB	Hyunsik, MosPick	ONE	2018	
"Young & One"	BtoB	Seo Jae-woo, Seo Yong-bae, BreadBeat, Hyunsik, Minhyuk, Peniel, Yeeun and Eunbin (CLC), E'dawn, Yuto and Wooseok (Pentagon), Soyeon	ONE	2018	
"In Your Light"	Changsub	Kim Yoo-kyung, The Forest	Lovely Horribly OST Part 5	2018	
"Say You Love Me"	Hyunsik	Hyunsik	On The Campus OST Part 4	2019	
"It Was Love"	Ilhoon (with Minah (Girl's Day))	Minah, Ilhoon, Jerry.L	My Absolute Boyfriend OST Part 7	2019	

== See also ==
- Seo Eunkwang discography
- Lee Min-hyuk discography
- Lee Chang-sub discography
- Im Hyun-sik discography
- Peniel Shin discography
- Jung Il-hoon discography
- Yook Sung-jae discography
