= BtoB discography =

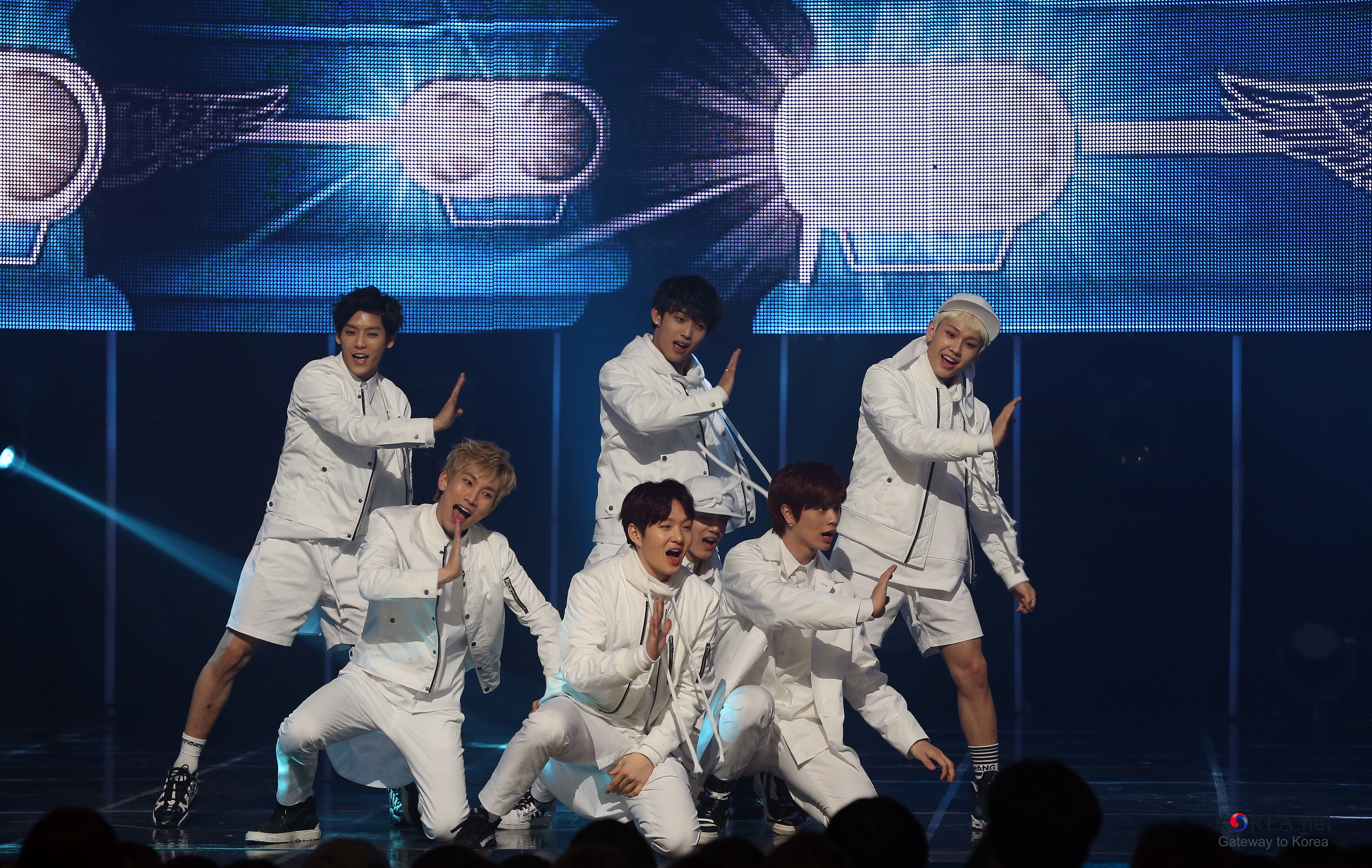
- BTOB performing "Beep Beep" on M Countdown
- Studio albums: 4
- EPs: 14
- Soundtrack albums: 16
- Compilation albums: 2
- Singles: 31
- Music videos: 28

South Korean boy group BtoB has released four studio albums, two compilation albums, fourteen extended plays, and thirty-one singles. The group was formed by Korean entertainment company Cube Entertainment in 2012, and originally consists of seven members. The group's first major release, the EP Born to Beat, was released on March 21, 2012.

== Albums ==
=== Studio albums ===
Title	Album details	Peak chart positions			Sales
Title	Album details	KOR	JPN	US World	Sales
Complete	Released: June 30, 2015 (KOR); Label: Cube Entertainment, Universal Music Group; Formats: CD, digital download; Track listing: 1. "Complete (Intro)"; 2. "It's Okay" (괜찮아요); 3. "You Do You" (너나 잘 살아); 4. "Yippie Yo Yippie Yay" (북 치고 장구 치고); 5. "Summer Romance"; 6. "My Boy's Girl" (친구의 여자친구); 7. "Beautiful To Me" (꽃보다 그녀); 8. "Miss You" (보고파); 9. "Giddy Up" (어기여차 디여차); 10. "Open"; 11. "Insane (Acoustic Version)"; 12. "Shake It"; 13. "Everything's Good (Outro) " (Ilhoon Solo)	1	—	—	KOR: 52,142
24/7	Released: December 7, 2016 (JPN); Label: Cube Entertainment Japan; Formats: CD, digital download; Track listing: 1. "Wow" (Japanese ver.); 2. "Hello Mello" (Japanese ver.); 3. "Guess Who's Back" (Rap line); 4. "Ha-Na-Bi"; 5. "Ashita" (未来 (あした)); 6. "二度目の告白" (Japanese ver.); 7. "今すぐここでKissを交わそうよ"; 8. "Snow Light Road" (Changsub solo); 9. "Beyond the Time"; 10. "レモネード"; 11. "See You Again"; 12. "クリスマス・イブ" (Vocal line); 13. "Christmas Time ～君だけを～"	—	1	—	JPN: 30,135
Brother Act.	Released: October 16, 2017 (KOR); Label: Cube Entertainment, LOEN Entertainment; Formats: CD, digital download; Track listing: 1. "A Day" (Prelude : 하루); 2. "Missing You" (그리워하다); 3. "My Lady"; 4. "Red Lie" (새빨간 거짓말); 5. "Blowin' Up" (신바람); 6. "Interlude: Brother Act."; 7. "Nanana" (나나나); 8. "Dreaming" (꿈에); 9. "Guitar (Stroke of Love)"; 10. "Running Into Breakup" (이별을 만나다); 11. "Fly Away"; 12. "Finale : Our Concert" (Finale : 우리들의 콘서트); 13. "Whisper (CD Only) " (속삭임)	4	—	14	KOR: 105,326
Be Together	Released: February 21, 2022 (KOR); Label: Cube Entertainment, Kakao Entertainment; Formats: CD, digital download; Track listing: 1. "Intro : The Trace" (Intro : 발자취); 2. "The Song" (노래); 3. "Blooming Day" (봄이 피어나); 4. "Be Together" (우리); 5. "My Way"; 6. "Whiskey"; 7. "Interlude: Re"; 8. "Lonely"; 9. "Dance With Me" (춤); 10. "Higher"; 11. "Thank You"; 12. "It's All Good" (흘려보내); 13. "Outro : Encore"	4	9	—	KOR: 123,780; JPN: 3,339
"—" denotes releases that did not chart or were not released in that region.

=== Compilation albums ===
Title	Album details	Peak chart positions		Sales
Title	Album details	KOR	JPN	Sales
BTOB Japan Best Album 2014-2017 ～1096 Days～	Released: February 28, 2018 (JPN); Label: Cube Entertainment Japan; Formats: CD, digital download; Track listing: 1. "Wow" (Japanese ver.); 2. "Regrets of Love"; 3. "Evidence"; 4. "Magic Time"; 5. "Crush on You"; 6. "L.U.V"; 7. "Beyond the Time"; 8. "Dear Bride"; 9. "Ashita" (未来(あした)); 10. "Brand New Days ～どんな未来を～"; 11. "Movie" (Japanese ver.); 12. "Blowin'"; 13. "花"; 14. "Sakurairo" (さくらいろ); 15. "Further Rise"; 16. "夏色 My Girl"; 17. "Hello Mello" (Japanese ver.); 18. "Second Confession" (二度目の告白) (Japanese ver.); 19. "Someday" (Japanese ver.); 20. "サヨナラを繰り返して"; 21. "また会えるから"; 22. "クリスマス・イブ"; 23. "Christmas Time ～君だけを～"; 24. "今すぐここでKISSを交わそうよ"	—	45	—N/a
Piece of BtoB	Released: March 7, 2019 (KOR); Label: Cube Entertainment, Kakao M; Formats: CD, digital download; Track listing: 1. "At the End" (Lee Changsub); 2. "Fancy Shoes" (Jung Ilhoon); 3. "That Girl" (Peniel); 4. "Swimming" (Im Hyunsik); 5. "Swimming" (Inst.) (Im Hyunsik); 6. "Purple Rain" (Feat. Cheeze) (Lee Minhyuk); 7. "Purple Rain" (Inst.) (Lee Minhyuk); 8. "Tell Me" (말해) (Yook Sungjae); 9. "Paradise" (Yook Sungjae); 10. "One Day" (Seo Eunkwang); 11. "Back in the Day" (그때) (Seo Eunkwang)	10	—	KOR: 10,573

== Extended plays ==
Title	EP details	Peak chart positions			Sales
Title	EP details	KOR	JPN	US World	Sales
Born to Beat	Released: April 3, 2012 (KOR); Label: Cube Entertainment, Universal Music Group; Formats: CD, digital download; Track listing: 1. "Born TO Beat"; 2. "Insane" (비밀); 3. "Imagine"; 4. "Monday To Sunday"	3	—	—	KOR: 21,514
Press Play	Released: September 12, 2012 (KOR); Label: Cube Entertainment, Universal Music Group; Formats: CD, digital download; Track listing: 1. "Press Play" (featuring (with G.NA)); 2. "WOW"; 3. "Lover Boy" (사랑밖에 난 몰라); 4. "U&I"; 5. "Stand Up"; 6. "My Girl"	4	—	—	KOR: 31,746
Thriller	Released: September 9, 2013 (KOR); Label: Cube Entertainment, Universal Music Group; Formats: CD, digital download; Track listing: 1. "When I Was Your Man" (내가 니 남자였을 때); 2. "Thriller" (스릴러); 3. "Why" (왜 이래); 4. "Catch Me"; 5. "Like A Crystal" (크리스탈같이); 6. "Star" (별)	3	—	—	KOR: 31,554
Beep Beep	Released: February 17, 2014 (KOR); Label: Cube Entertainment, Universal Music Group; Formats: CD, digital download; Track listing: 1. "Beep Beep" (뛰뛰빵빵); 2. "Broken Heart" (끝난 건가요); 3. "Ello Ello" (여보세요); 4. "Hello Mello"; 5. "Endless (Melody)" (끝나지 않을 (Melody))	1	—	—	KOR: 41,408
Move	Released: September 29, 2014 (KOR); Label: Cube Entertainment, Universal Music Group; Formats: CD, digital download; Track listing: 1. "You're So Fly" (넌 감동이야); 2. "Hope You're Doing Fine" (잘 지내겠죠); 3. "Happening"; 4. "You're My Angel" (넌 나의 천사 featuring (with Joo)); 5. "I Dont Know" (몰라); 6. "Shake It" (Bonus Track - CD Only)	1	—	—	KOR: 24,590
The Winter's Tale	Released: December 22, 2014 (KOR); Label: Cube Entertainment, Universal Music Group; Formats: CD, digital download; Track listing: 1. "You Can Cry" (울어도 돼); 2. "The Winter's Tale" (울면 안 돼); 3. "One Sip" (한 모금); 4. "Cheers!" (마셔!); 5. "Because It's Christmas" (크리스마스라서)	1	—	—	KOR: 35,366
I Mean	Released: October 12, 2015 (KOR); Label: Cube Entertainment, Universal Music Group; Formats: CD, digital download; Track listing: 1. "Last Day"; 2. "Way Back Home" (집으로 가는 길); 3. "Heart Attack" (심장어택); 4. "Neverland" (featuring (with G.NA)); 5. "Naviety" (나 빼고 다 늑대); 6. "Will Be Here" (여기 있을게)	2	—	—	KOR: 50,495
Remember That	Released: March 28, 2016 (KOR); Label: Cube Entertainment, Universal Music Group; Formats: CD, digital download; Track listing: 1. "Killing Me"; 2. "Color Your Days" (그려본다 (내가 그린 그림)); 3. "Remember That" (봄날의 기억); 4. "Anymore"; 5. "So Pretty"; 6. "Just Like You" (너 같아서); 7. "By Your Side" (자리비움)	1	—	—	KOR: 54,093
New Men	Released: November 7, 2016 (KOR); Label: Cube Entertainment, Universal Music Group; Formats: CD, digital download; Track listing: 1. "New Men"; 2. "Pray (I'll Be Your Man)" (기도 (I'll Be Your Man)); 3. "Love Drunk" (취해); 4. "I'm bored" (무료해 (콕 To Me)); 5. "Yes I Am"; 6. "Come on over" (놀러와); 7. "Melody song" (예지앞사)	4	—	—	KOR: 55,732; JPN: 963
Feel'eM	Released: March 6, 2017 (KOR); Label: Cube Entertainment, LOEN Entertainment; Formats: CD, digital download; Track listing: 1. "Just Tell Me" (말만 해); 2. "Movie"; 3. "About Time"; 4. "Rock N Hiphop" (빨리 뛰어); 5. "Someday" (언젠가)	2	—	15	KOR: 75,617; JPN: 1,055
This Is Us	Released: June 18, 2018 (KOR); Label: Cube Entertainment, Kakao M; Formats: CD, digital download; Track listing: 1. "Call Me"; 2. "Only one for me" (너 없인 안 된다); 3. "Yeah"; 4. "Blue Moon"; 5. "IceBreaker"; 6. "1,2,3"; 7. "The Feeling"	2	—	15	KOR: 119,401
Hour Moment	Released: November 12, 2018 (KOR); Label: Cube Entertainment, Kakao M; Formats: CD, digital download; Track listing: 1. "Friend"; 2. "Like It"; 3. "Butterfly" (나비); 4. "Climax" (제발); 5. "Beautiful Pain"	1	—	—	KOR: 101,747
4U: Outside	Released: August 30, 2021 (KOR); Label: Cube Entertainment, Kakao Entertainment; Formats: CD, digital download; Track listing: 1. "Dreamer"; 2. "Outsider"; 3. "Can't Breathe" (미치고 싶어); 4. "Traveler" (여행); 5. "Waiting 4 U"; 6. "Finale (Show and Prove)" (피날레)	2	21	—	KOR: 83,105; JPN: 2,932
Outsider	Released: October 27, 2021 (JPN); Label: Universal Music Japan; Formats: CD, digital download; Track listing: 1. "Outsider" (Japanese ver.); 2. "Show Your Love" (Japanese ver.); 3. "Finale (Show and Prove)" (Japanese ver.); 4. "Just One More Time" (もう一度だけ)	—	13	—	JPN: 6,039
Wind and Wish	Released: May 2, 2023 (KOR); Label: Cube Entertainment, Kakao M; Formats: CD, digital download; Track listing: 1. "Wind and Wish" (나의 바람); 2. "Heaven"; 3. "Day & Night"; 4. "Moon Ride"; 5. "Your Love"	3	24	—	KOR: 101,230; JPN: 1,152
Btoday	Released: March 5, 2025 (KOR); Label: BtoB Company, Kakao M; Formats: CD, digital download; Track listing: 1. "Please Stay" (불씨); 2. "Love Today"; 3. "Starry Night"; 4. "Say Yes"; 5. "Be Alright"; 6. "Hi Beautiful" (이보다 더 좋을 수 있을까)	5	—	—	KOR: 69,726
"—" denotes releases that did not chart or were not released in that region.

== Singles ==
Title	Year	Peak chart positions					Sales	Certifications	Album
Title	Year	KOR Circle	KOR Hot	JPN Oricon	JPN Hot	US World	Sales	Certifications	Album
Korean
"Insane" (비밀)	2012	95	74	—	—	—	KOR: 169,621	—N/a	Born to Beat
"Father" (아버지)	2012	136	—	—	—	—	—N/a	—N/a	Born to Beat Asia Special Edition
"Irresistible Lips" (그 입술을 뺏었어)	2012	99	—	—	—	—	KOR: 60,002	—N/a	Born to Beat Asia Special Edition
"WOW"	2012	76	33	—	—	—	KOR: 128,334	—N/a	Press Play
"I Only Know Love" (사랑밖에 난 몰라)	2012	—	—	—	—	—	—N/a	—N/a	Press Play
"2nd Confession" (두 번째 고백)	2013	44	35	—	—	—	KOR: 180,639	—N/a	Non-album single
"When I Was Your Man" (내가 니 남자였을때)	2013	—	—	—	—	—	—N/a	—N/a	Thriller
"Thriller" (스릴러)	2013	41	84	—	—	—	KOR: 66,900	—N/a	Thriller
"Beep Beep" (뛰뛰빵빵)	2014	18	44	—	—	—	KOR: 240,479	—N/a	Beep Beep
"You're So Fly" (넌 감동이야)	2014	46	—N/a	—	—	—	KOR: 66,344	—N/a	Move
"You Can Cry" (울어도 돼)	2014	24	—N/a	—	—	—	KOR: 144,345	—N/a	The Winter's Tale
"The Winter's Tale" (울면 안 돼)	2014	7	—N/a	—	—	—	KOR: 86,642	—N/a	The Winter's Tale
"It's Okay" (괜찮아요)	2015	8	—N/a	—	—	—	KOR: 540,224	—N/a	Complete
"Way Back Home" (집으로 가는 길)	2015	5	—N/a	—	—	—	KOR: 302,008	—N/a	I Mean
"Remember That" (봄날의 기억)	2016	11	—N/a	—	—	—	KOR: 331,331	—N/a	Remember That
"I Want to Vacation" (여행 가고 싶어)	2016	91	—N/a	—	—	—	KOR: 43,925	—N/a	Non-album single
"Pray (I'll Be Your Man)" (기도)	2016	5	—N/a	—	—	—	KOR: 326,530	—N/a	New Men
"Someday" (언젠가)	2017	14	—N/a	—	—	—	KOR: 244,651	—N/a	Feel'eM
"Movie"	2017	4	57	—	—	25	KOR: 821,420	—N/a	Feel'eM
"Missing You" (그리워하다)	2017	2	4	—	—	23	KOR: 2,500,000	—N/a	Brother Act.
"Only One for Me" (너 없인 안 된다)	2018	4	4	—	—	—	KOR: 2,500,000	KMCA: Platinum (Note: Platinum for streaming)	This Is Us
"Friend"	2018	23	—	—	—	—		—N/a	Hour Moment
"Beautiful Pain" (아름답고도 아프구나)	2018	4	3	—	—	—		—N/a	Hour Moment
"Sorry" (미안해) (Eunkwang, Changsub and Minhyuk)	2019	96	—	—	—	—		—N/a	Non-album single
"Outsider"	2021	35	—	—	—	—		—N/a	4U: Outside
"The Song" (노래)	2022	10	35	—	—	—		—N/a	Be Together
"Wind and Wish" (나의 바람)	2023	26	—	—	—	—		—N/a	Wind and Wish
"Please Stay" (불씨)	2024	— (Note: "Please Stay" did not enter the Circle Digital Chart, but peaked at number 20 on the component Download Chart.)	—	—	—	—		—N/a	Btoday
"Be Alright"	2024	— (Note: "Be Alright" did not enter the Circle Digital Chart, but peaked at number 30 on the component Download Chart.)	—	—	—	—		—N/a	Btoday
"Hi Beautiful" (이보다 더 좋을 수 있을까)	2024	— (Note: "Hi Beautiful" did not enter the Circle Digital Chart, but peaked at number 13 on the component Download Chart.)	—	—	—	—		—N/a	Btoday
"Love Today"	2025	183	—	—	—	—		—N/a	Btoday
"We Together" (우리 다시)	2026	— (Note: "We Together" did not enter the Circle Digital Chart, but peaked at number 16 on the component Download Chart.)	—	—	—	—		—N/a	Non-album single
Japanese
"Wow"	2014	—	—N/a	9	12	—	JPN: 26,218 (phy.)	—N/a	24/7
"Mirai (Ashita)"	2015	—	—N/a	2	2	—	JPN: 77,399 (phy.)	—N/a	24/7
"Summer Color My Girl"	2015	—	—N/a	4	3	—	JPN: 91,513 (phy.)	—N/a	Non-album singles
"Dear Bride"	2016	—	—N/a	2	2	—	JPN: 110,794 (phy.)	—N/a	Non-album singles
"L.U.V"	2016	—	—N/a	1	1	—	JPN: 78,836 (phy.)	—N/a	Non-album singles
"Movie"	2017	—	—N/a	3	4	—	JPN: 41,367 (phy.)	—N/a	Non-album singles
"Brand New Days"	2017	—	—N/a	—	3	4	JPN: 47,693 (phy.)	RIAJ: Gold	Non-album singles
"—" denotes releases that did not chart or were not released in that region.

== Other charted songs ==
Title	Year	Peak chart positions	Sales	Album
Title	Year	KOR	Sales	Album
"Live Well Yourself" (너나 잘 살아)	2015	81	KOR: 29,295	Complete
"Summer Romance"	2015	86	KOR: 28,572	Complete
"I Miss You" (보고파)	2015	92	KOR: 27,232	Complete
"Her Over Flowers" (꽃보다 그녀)	2015	94	KOR: 26,602	Complete
"Insane" (acoustic version) (비밀)	2015	100	KOR: 24,560	Complete
"My Friend's Girlfriend" (친구의 여자친구)	2015	108	KOR: 22,134	Complete
"One Man Show" (북 치고 장구 치고)	2015	117	KOR: 19,595	Complete
"Open"	2015	120	KOR: 20,885	Complete
"Everything`s Good (Outro)" (Ilhoon solo)	2015	126	KOR: 19,790	Complete
"Giddy Up" (어기여차 디여차)	2015	134	KOR: 18,531	Complete
"Shake It"	2015	141	KOR: 17,799	Complete
"Complete (Intro)"	2015	162	KOR: 13,953	Complete
"Last Day"	2015	49	KOR: 37,129	I Mean
"I'll Be Here" (여기 있을게)	2015	52	KOR: 34,887	I Mean
"Heart Attack" (심장어택)	2015	75	KOR: 27,278	I Mean
"All Wolves Except Me" (나 빼고 다 늑대)	2015	78	KOR: 26,434	I Mean
"Neverland" (feat.G.NA)	2015	96	KOR: 23,976	I Mean
"Killing Me"	2016	68	KOR: 41,950	Remember That
"Color Your Days" (그려본다 (내가 그린 그림))	2016	78	KOR: 37,570	Remember That
"Just Like You" (너 같아서)	2016	88	KOR: 33,347	Remember That
"Empty Space" (자리비움)	2016	94	KOR: 31,979	Remember That
"So Pretty"	2016	99	KOR: 30,743	Remember That
"Anymore"	2016	104	KOR: 27,613	Remember That
"Love Drunk" (취해)	2016	51	KOR: 35,818	New Men
"Yejiapsa" (예지앞사)	2016	61	KOR: 31,704	New Men
"Yes I Am"	2016	74	KOR: 28,784	New Men
"I'm Bored" (무료해 (콕 To Me))	2016	75	KOR: 28,695	New Men
"Come On Over" (놀러와)	2016	79	KOR: 28,114	New Men
"New Men"	2016	86	KOR: 25,485	New Men
"About Time"	2017	30	KOR: 72,338	Feel'eM
"Just Say It" (말만 해)	2017	40	KOR: 59,695	Feel'eM
"Rock N Hiphop" (빨리 뛰어)	2017	50	KOR: 31,525	Feel'eM
"My Lady"	2017	34	KOR: 46,015	Brother Act.
"Red Lie" (새빨간 거짓말)	2017	41	KOR: 44,223	Brother Act.
"Blowin' Up" (신바람)	2017	56	KOR: 38,459	Brother Act.
"Nanana"	2017	61	KOR: 36,061	Brother Act.
"Dreaming" (꿈에)	2017	47	KOR: 40,429	Brother Act.
"Guitar (Stroke of Love)"	2017	66	KOR: 34,281	Brother Act.
"Running Into Breakup" (이별을 만나다)	2017	55	KOR: 39,129	Brother Act.
"Fly Away"	2017	69	KOR: 34,788	Brother Act.
"Finale (Our Concert)"	2017	74	KOR: 32,405	Brother Act.
"The Feeling"	2018	18	—N/a	This Is Us
"Blue Moon"	2018	62	—N/a	This Is Us
"Call Me"	2018	75	—N/a	This Is Us
"Yeah"	2018	90	—N/a	This Is Us
"1, 2, 3" (Eunkwang, Sungjae, Changsub and Hyunsik)	2018	96	—N/a	This Is Us
"Climax" (제발)	2018	67	—N/a	Hour Moment
"Butterfly" (나비)	2018	87	—N/a	Hour Moment
"Like It"	2018	89	—N/a	Hour Moment
"Dreamer"	2021	178	—N/a	4U: Outside
"Blooming Day" (봄이 피어나)	2022	103	—N/a	Be Together
"Be Together" (우리)	2022	135	—N/a	Be Together
"Dance with Me" (춤)	2022	173	—N/a	Be Together
"Thank You"	2022	162	—N/a	Be Together
"Heaven"	2023	117	—N/a	Wind and Wish
"Day&Night"	2023	133	—N/a	Wind and Wish
"Moon Ride"	2023	138	—N/a	Wind and Wish
"Your Love"	2023	139	—N/a	Wind and Wish

== Soundtrack appearances ==
Title	Year	Album
"Bye Bye Love"	2013	When A Man Loves OST
"Past Days"	2013	Monstar OST
"After Time Passes"	2013	Monstar OST
"First Love"	2013	Monstar OST
"Goodbye Sadness"	2015	Sweet, Savage Family OST
"Come With Eerie"	2016	Telemonster OST
"For You"	2016	Cinderella with Four Knights OST
"Voice"	2016	The Miracle OST
"Let's Go (여행 가고싶어)"	2016	Battle Trip Theme Song
"Ambiguous"	2017	Fight for My Way OST

== Collaborations ==
Title	Year	Other artist(s)	Album
"Christmas Song"	2013	United Cube Artists	Non-album release
"Special Christmas"	2016	Hyuna, Jang Hyun-seung, Roh Ji-hoon, CLC, PENTAGON	2016 United Cube Project 1
"Follow Your Dreams (한걸음)"	2018	Hyuna, Jo Kwon, CLC, PENTAGON, Yoo Seon-ho, (G)I-DLE	One
"Upgrade"	2018	Hyuna, Jo Kwon, CLC, PENTAGON, Yoo Seon-ho, (G)I-DLE	One
"Young & One"	2018	Hyuna, Jo Kwon, CLC, PENTAGON, Yoo Seon-ho, (G)I-DLE	One
"Mermaid"	2018	Lee Min-hyuk, Peniel Shin, Jung Il-hoon with Yeeun (CLC) Wooseok (PENTAGON) and Jeon So-yeon ((G)I-DLE)	One

== Music videos ==
Title	Year	Directors	Other version(s)
Korean
"Insane"	2012	Zanybros	—N/a
"Father"	2012	Unknown	—N/a
"Irresistible Lips"	2012	Zanybros	—N/a
"WOW"	2012	Zanybros	Dance version
"Lover Boy"	2012	Unknown	—N/a
"2nd Confession"	2013	Unknown	—N/a
"When I Was Your Man"	2013	Unknown	—N/a
"Thriller"		Unknown	—N/a
"Beep Beep"	2014	Zanybros	—N/a
"You're So Fly"	2014	Zanybros	—N/a
"You Can Cry"	2014	Unknown	—N/a
"The Winter's Tale"	2014	JayFactory	—N/a
"It's Okay"	2015	Zanybros	Dance version
"Way Back Home"	2015	Zanybros	—N/a
"Remember That"	2016	DIR. HYUN YOUNG SUNG	—N/a
"Pray (I'll Be Your Man)"	2016	Vikings League	—N/a
"MOVIE"	2017	PURPLE STRAW FILM	—N/a
"Missing You"	2017	VISUALFROM	—N/a
"Only One For Me"	2018	Shin Hee-won	—N/a
"Beautiful Pain"	2018	Dee Shin	—N/a
Japanese
"WOW"	2014	Unknown	—N/a
"Mirai (Ashita)"	2015	Unknown	—N/a
"My Girl"	2015	Unknown	—N/a
"Dear Bride"	2016	Unknown	—N/a
"L.U.V"	2016	Unknown	—N/a
"Christmas Time"	2016	Unknown	—N/a
"MOVIE"	2017	Unknown	—N/a
"Brand New Days"	2017	Unknown	—N/a

== See also ==
- Seo Eunkwang discography
- Lee Min-hyuk discography
- Lee Chang-sub discography
- Im Hyun-sik discography
- Peniel Shin discography
- Jung Il-hoon discography
- Yook Sung-jae discography
