= BtoB videography =

The following listed below are the videography of South Korean boy group, BtoB. This includes their notable group and individual activities that they've done since debut in 2012.

== Music videos ==
=== Korean ===
Year	Title	Published	Remarks	Ref.
2012	"Insane"	March 21	Featuring Apink's Chorong	
2012	"Father"	May 2		
2012	"Irresistible Lips"	May 22	Featuring Seo Woo	
2012	"WOW"	September 11		
2012	"Lover Boy"	October 23	Special music video featuring Diary moments.	
2013	"2nd Confession"	April 10	Featuring CLC's Seunghee, voice cameo from g.o.d's Danny	
2013	"When I Was Your Man"	August 28	Pre-released track for Thriller.	
2013	"Thriller"	September 4		
2014	"Beep Beep"	February 16	Guest appearances by CLC's Yujin, Seungyeon, Yeeun	
2014	"You’re So Fly"	September 29	Featuring Park Na-rae, Jang Do-yeon	
2014	"You Can Cry"	December 4	Pre-released track for The Winter's Tale	
2014	"The Winter's Tale"	December 21	Featuring Cho Eun Hyung, CLC's Seunghee	
2015	"It's Okay"	June 28		
2015	"Way Back Home"	October 12		
2016	"Remember that"	March 28	Starring Lee Minhyuk and Jo Bo-ah	
2016	"I'll Be Your Man"	November 7	Featuring CLC's Elkie	
2017	"Movie"	March 6	With Asu Taskiranoglu	
2017	"Missing You"	October 16		
2018	"Only One For Me"	June 18		
2018	"Beautiful Pain"	November 12		

=== Japanese ===
Year	Title	Published	Remarks	Ref.
2014	"WOW"	November 7		
2015	"Mirai (Ashita))"	March 17	Featuring Yuko Araki	
2015	"My Girl"	August 19		
2016	"Christmas Time"	December 4		
2016	"Dear Bride"	February 14		
2016	"L.U.V"	June 11		
2017	"Movie"	April 26		
2017	"Brand New Days"	August 21		

== Video albums ==
Title	Album details	Peak chart positions	Sales
Title	Album details	JPN	Sales
Title	Album details	DVD	Sales
"Born TO Beat" BTOB DEBUT & HISTORY	Released: December 19, 2012; Label: Cube Entertainment; Formats: DVD	268	
BTOB 1st FAN Meeting	Released: December 3, 2014; Label: Cube Entertainment; Formats: DVD	131	
1st concert: Hello Melody	Released: March 17, 2015; Label: Cube Entertainment; Formats: DVD	—	
BTOB 2015 1st 単独コンサート ～The Secret Diary～	Released: August 3, 2015; Label: Kiss Entertainment; Formats: DVD	–	
BTOB - It's OK Special	Released: December 21, 2015; Label: Cube Entertainment; Formats: DVD	—	
2015-16 BTOB Born To Beat Time Concert	Released: July 6, 2016; Label: Cube Entertainment; Formats: DVD	—	
BTOB EP#03 Time Concert 2017; Photobook + Fanz Video Card	Released: December 21, 2015; Label: Cube Entertainment; Formats: DVD	—	
BTOB EP#04 BTOB Time Concert 2017; Movie & Documentary: Fanz Video Card + Photobook	Released: December 21, 2015; Label: Cube Entertainment; Formats: DVD	—	

== Filmography ==
=== Drama series and cameos ===
Year	Title	Member	Role	Network	Notes	Ref.
2011	Living Among the Rich	Eunkwang, Minhyuk, Hyunsik, Ilhoon	Themselves	JTBC	Cameo	
2013	The Heirs	BTOB	Themselves	SBS	Cameo, Episode 4	
2013	SNL Korea 4	BTOB	Themselves	tvN	Guest appearance, episode 30	
2013	When a Man Falls in Love	BTOB	Themselves	MBC	Cameo, Episode 8	
2014	America's Next Top Model	BTOB	Themselves	The CW	Guest appearance	
2015	The Village: Achiara's Secret	BTOB	Themselves	SBS	Cameo, Episode 14	
2019	Dae Jang Geum Is Watching	Hyunsik, Peniel, Ilhoon, Sungjae	Im Heon-sik, Donggeuniel, RoongD, Oh Seong-jae	MBC	Cameo, Episode 16	

=== Reality shows ===
Year	Title	Episodes	Network	Notes	Ref
2012	BtoB Amazon	5 episodes	Mnet		
2012	BtoB: Parent's Day Special Event	2 episodes	YouTube		
2012	MTV Diary	64 episodes	SBS MTV	Along MYNAME, JJ Project and VIXX	
2012–2013	B+ Diary	5 episodes	SBS MTV		
2013	Hallo BtoB Star Chat	3 episodes	Mnet		
2014	Cool Men	6 episodes	SBS MTV		
2016–2017	BtoB Amigo Tv Season 1	3 episodes	Amigo Tv		
2017–2018	BTOB: Conti-NEW	8 episodes	Naver Tv, V Live	Healing Reality Show	
2018	BtoB Amigo Tv Season 2	3 episodes	Amigo Tv		

=== Variety shows ===
Year	Title	Episodes	Network	Notes
2012	Lim Hyunsik's Sik's Sense Season 1	7 episodes	YouTube	
2012–2013	Lim Hyunsik's Sik's Sense Season 2	8 episodes	YouTube	
2013–2014	BtoB: Black Box Season 1 – MSC	20 episodes	YouTube	MSC is the abbreviation of "Manager Self Camera"
2014	BtoB: Black Box Season 2 – MSC	19 episodes	YouTube	MSC is the abbreviation of "Manager Self Camera"
2014–2015	BtoB's The Beat	19 episodes	YouTube, V Live	
2015	BtoB's The Beat Season 2	5 episodes	YouTube, V Live	
2015	BtoB's The Beat Season 3	7 episodes	YouTube	
2016	BtoB's The Beat EXTRA Series	20 episodes	YouTube	
2016	BtoB: Summer Festival	51 episodes	YouTube	
2016	BtoB's The Beat Season 4	11 episodes	YouTube, V Live	
2016	BtoB's The Beat EXTRA Season 2 Series	11 episodes	YouTube	
2016	BtoB: Beatcom	Ongoing	YouTube, V Live	BtoB's Daily Lives = Sitcom (situation comedy)
2017	BtoB Talk	7 episodes	V Live+	
2017	BtoB's The Beat Season 5	2 episodes	V Live	BtoB Fashion King; 5th Anniversary Party Sik's Sense
2017	Btob Relay Delivery	12 episodes	V Live+	
2018	비투비의 하.다.방 (BTOB's HA.DA.BANG)	Ongoing	YouTube	HA.DA.BANG was from korean acronym: 하고 싶은 거 (RR: HAgoshipengo, What you want to do); 다 하는 (RR: Da hanen, Do everything); 방송 (RR: BAngseong, Broadcast); Meaning, do whatever you want broadcast.

== See also ==
- BtoB discography
