= The Song =

The Song may refer to:

- Geet (1944 film), or The Song, a Bollywood film
- The Song (2014 film), an American romantic drama film
- The Song (Smash), an episode of the American television series Smash
- "The Song", a song by BtoB, 2022
- "The Song", a song by The Chipettes from the soundtrack to the film Alvin and the Chipmunks: The Squeakquel, 2009
- "The Song", a song by Maisie Peters from The Good Witch (Deluxe), 2023
