= Be Together =

Be Together may refer to:

- "Be Together" (TM Network song), 1987; popularized by Ami Suzuki, 1999
- "Be Together" (Major Lazer song), 2015
- Be Together (film), 2015
- Be Together, a 2022 album by BtoB
