= Mirai (Ashita) =

Single by BTOB

from the album 24/7
- Released: March 25, 2015
- Genre: J-pop
- Label: Kiss Entertainment

Music video
- 未来（あした） on YouTube

"Mirai (Ashita)" is the second Japanese single released by BTOB. It was released in four versions: a limited CD+DVD edition that came with a photo booklet and three regular CD only editions, each with a different B-side.

== Commercial performance ==
The single debuted and peaked at number 2 on the Oricon Singles Chart for the week ending March 29, 2015. In its second week, the single fell to number 34 before dropping from the Top 50. The single was the 80th best-selling single in 2015.

== Track list ==
Limited Edition CD
| No. | Title | Length |
|---|---|---|
| 1. | "未来(あした)" (Mirai (Ashita)) |
| 2. | "桜色" (Sakurairo) |
| 3. | "Regrets of Love" |
| 4. | "MAGIC TIME" |
| 5. | "Mirai (Ashita)" (Instrumental) |

DVD
| No. | Title | Length |
|---|---|---|
| 1. | "Mirai (Ashita) PV" |
| 2. | "PV Making" |

Regular Edition - Type A
| No. | Title | Length |
|---|---|---|
| 1. | "未来(あした)" (Mirai (Ashita)) |
| 2. | "桜色" (Sakurairo) |
| 3. | "未来(あした)" (Instrumental) |
| 4. | "桜色" (Instrumental) |

Regular Edition - Type B
| No. | Title | Length |
|---|---|---|
| 1. | "未来(あした)" (Mirai (Ashita)) |
| 2. | "Regreats of Love" |
| 3. | "未来(あした)" (Instrumental) |
| 4. | "Regreats of Love" (Instrumental) |

Regular Edition - Type C
| No. | Title | Length |
|---|---|---|
| 1. | "未来(あした)" (Mirai (Ashita)) |
| 2. | "MAGIC TIME" (未来(あした)) |
| 3. | Untitled (Instrumental) |
| 4. | "MAGIC TIME" (Instrumental) |

== Charts ==
=== Weekly charts ===
| Chart (2015) | Peak position |
|---|---|
| Japan (Oricon) | 2 |

=== Year-end charts ===
| Chart (2015) | Peak position |
|---|---|
| Japan (Oricon) | 80 |

== Chart sales ==
| Released | Oricon Chart | Peak | Debut sales | Sales total |
|---|---|---|---|---|
| Marcht 25, 2015 | Daily Singles Chart | 2 | - | 77,399+ |
| Marcht 25, 2015 | Weekly Singles Chart | 2 | 77,399 | 77,399+ |
| Marcht 25, 2015 | Monthly Singles Chart | - | - | 77,399+ |
| Marcht 25, 2015 | Yearly Singles Chart | 80 | - | 77,399+ |
