= Complete (BtoB album) =

Studio album by BTOB
- Released: June 29, 2015
- Recorded: 2015
- Label: Cube Entertainment; Universal Music Group

BTOB chronology
| The Winter's Tale (2014) | Complete (2015) | I Mean (2015) |

Singles from Complete
- 1. "It's Okay" Released: June 29, 2015

Music videos
- "괜찮아요 (It's Okay)" on YouTube

Complete is the first full-length studio album by South Korean boy group, BTOB. It was released on June 29, 2015. The album contains 13 tracks including a previously released bonus track "Shake It" from their fifth mini-album, Move, and an acoustic version of their debut track "Insane". The group promoted with the title track "It's Okay".

== Background and release ==
On June 4, 2015, Cube Entertainment announced that BTOB will be releasing their first studio album on June 29, 2015. This marks the start of BTOB's 2015 full-scale comeback activities. Ahead of comeback, BTOB notified the 180 degree different transformation of their style compared to previous promotions, with their first ever R&B ballad title-track "It’s Okay". "It's Okay" is expected to be reversal with a different level of BTOB's powerful vocal as weapon. They also stated that this transformation would show a more 'music influenced' side.

"It's Okay" topped multiple music charts after its release, making it BTOB's first single to reach #1 on charts after 3 years of debut.

== Promotions ==
On June 28, BTOB held a live showcase event for "Complete" via Naver Starcast. The group performed "It's Okay" and other tracks from the album for the first time. On June 29, the group held a second comeback showcase hosted by labelmates, actor-model Na Jong-chan and CLC's Jang Ye-eun. The group made their first official music show performance on MBC Music's Show Champion, performing the tracks "It's Okay" and "Giddy Up". It was soon followed by performances on KBS's Music Bank, MBC's Show! Music Core and SBS's Inkigayo.

== Composition ==
The album starts off with the a cappella intro "Complete" produced by E.ONE. Followed by the lead single "It's Okay", which is a heartfelt R&B ballad. "Live Well Yourself" is a follow-up song for "It's Okay", and is a piano riff driven track. "My Friend's Girlfriend" is a new jack swing track about the unimaginable conflict between love and loyalty. "I Miss You" is an aggressive track with cute lyrics about the desire to see a loved one. "Giddy Up" is a dance track written by Seo Jae-woo, Big Sancho, Daniel Caesar and Ludwig Lindell. "Open" is a sexy track written and produced by member, Minhyuk. The album also includes an acoustic version of BTOB's debut single, "Insane", and a previously released party track "Shake It". "Shake It" is a disco-style electronic genre. The album ends with the outro by Ilhoon, "Everything's Good" which is a track with gentle flowing melody with piano music.

== Music video ==
The music video for "It's Okay" was released on June 29, on BTOB's Official YouTube Channel. The music video follows a drama-format similar to story-telling. It features the members representing different careers: Ilhoon as a radio DJ, Hyunsik as an art student, Peniel as a firefighter, Sungjae as a hiker, Changsub as a delivery guy, Eunkwang as a student, and Minhyuk as unemployed guy, all struggling to reach their dreams. On July 5, BTOB released a dance version for the music video, after reaching 1 million views for "It's Okay".

== Track listing ==
| No. | Title | Lyrics | Music | Arrangement | Length |
|---|---|---|---|---|---|
| 1. | "Complete (Intro)" | E.ONE | E.ONE | E.ONE | 2:38 |
| 2. | "It's Okay" (괜찮아요) | Son Youngjin, Jo Sungho, Hong Seungsung, Lee Minhyuk, Jung Il-hoon | Son Youngjin, Jo Sungho | Son Youngjin, Jo Sungho | 4:12 |
| 3. | "Live Well Yourself" (너나 잘 살아) | Bickssancho, Socrates | Seo Jaewoo | Seo Jaewoo | 3:45 |
| 4. | "One Man Show" (북 치고 장구 치고) | Seo Jaewoo, Seo Yongbae, Lee Minhyuk, Jung Ilhoon | Seo Jaewoo, Seo Yongbae | Seo Jaewoo, Seo Yongbae | 3:42 |
| 5. | "Summer Romance" | Bickssancho, FERDY, Lim Hyunsik | Bickssancho, FERDY, Lim Hyunsik | Bickssancho, FERDY | 3:41 |
| 6. | "My Friend's Girlfriend" (친구의 여자친구) | Jung Ilhoon, Lim Hyunsik, Lee Minhyuk | Jung Ilhoon, Lim Hyunsik | Seo Jaewoo | 3:41 |
| 7. | "Her Over Flowers" (꽃보다 그녀) | Jo Sungho, FERDY, Jung Ilhoon | Jo Sungho, FERDY | Jo Sungho, FERDY | 3:23 |
| 8. | "I Miss You" (보고파) | Lim Hyunsik | Lim Hyunsik | Lim Hyunsik | 4:03 |
| 9. | "Giddy Up" (어기여차 디여차) | Seo Jaewoo, Bickssancho, CAESAR & LOUI, Lee Minhyuk | Seo Jaewoo, Bickssancho, CAESAR & LOUI | Seo Jaewoo, Bickssancho, CAESAR & LOUI | 3:13 |
| 10. | "Open" | Lee Minhyuk, Jerry.L, Jung Ilhoon | Lee Minhyuk, Jerry.L | Lee Minhyuk, Jerry.L | 3:17 |
| 11. | "Insane" (acoustic version) | Seo Jaewoo, Seo Yongbae, Lee Minhyuk, Jung Ilhoon | Seo Jaewoo, Seo Yongbae | Seo Jaewoo, Seo Yongbae | 3:06 |
| 12. | "Shake It" | Lim Hyunsik, Jung Ilhoon | Lim Hyunsik, Jung Ilhoon | Lim Hyunsik, Jung Ilhoon | 3:14 |
| 13. | "Everything`s Good (Outro)" (Ilhoon Solo) | Jung Ilhoon | Jung Ilhoon | Jung Ilhoon, Lim Hyunsik, Son Youngjin | 4:05 |
| Total length: | | | | | 45:50 |

== Chart performance ==
| Chart (2015) | Peak position | Physical sales (2015) |
|---|---|---|
| South Korea (Gaon Weekly Album Chart) | 1 | 47,638 |
| South Korea (Gaon Monthly Album Chart) | 9 | 47,638 |
| South Korea (Gaon 2015 Album Chart) | 52 | 47,638 |

== Release history ==
| Country | Date | Format | Label |
|---|---|---|---|
| South Korea | June 29, 2015 | Digital download, CD | Cube Entertainment; Universal Music Group |
