= Beep Beep (EP) =

- Cover of Beep Beep

EP by BTOB
- Released: February 17, 2014
- Recorded: 2014
- Genres: K-pop, dance-pop
- Language: Korean
- Labels: Cube Entertainment; Universal Music Group

BTOB chronology
Thriller (2013)	Beep Beep (2014)	Move (2014)

Singles from Beep Beep
- 1. "Beep Beep" Released: February 16, 2014

Music videos
- "뛰뛰빵빵 (Beep Beep)" on YouTube

Beep Beep (Korean: 뛰뛰빵빵) is the fourth EP by South Korean boy band BTOB. It was released on February 17, 2014, consisting a total of 5 tracks with Beep Beep as title track and promotional single of the album.

== Background ==
On February 8, 2014, Cube Entertainment uploaded individual teaser photos of BTOB's members and the track list for their new album. On February 12, 2014, 3 video teasers were uploaded on consecutive days with a snippet of the title track, Beep Beep On February 16, 2014, the music video for "Beep Beep" was released and on February 17, the EP was officially released.

== Composition ==
The EP features a total of 5 tracks with 2 tracks co-produced by the members of BTOB themselves. The EP opens with Beep Beep, a song that boasts a balanced mix of hip-hop, pop, and a hint of R&B. The second track, Is This The End is a ballad track and the third track, Hello is a classic up-beat track. It has a backbeat that is slightly rock influenced. The fourth track, Hello Mello is a mid-tempo track that is heavy on the slow rap and the fifth track, Never Ending (Melody) is a ballad dedicated to the group's fans (BTOB's fan club is known as "Melody").

== Promotion ==
BTOB made their first comeback stage on February 20 at Mnet's M!Countdown, February 20 on KBS's Music Bank and February 22 at MBC's Show! Music Core. The group also held fan meetings in four cities around South Korea, namely Busan, Daegu, Daejeon and Seoul. The group will also be carrying out activities on variety shows and radio broadcasts to promote the EP.

== Commercial performance ==
Following the release of the EP, Beep Beep was number one on Hanteo real time charts on February 17, 2014, at 15:00 (KST). The album was also ranked in the top three positions on major online real time charts such as Bugs and Soribada. Beep Beep has also made it to number one on Hanteo's weekly charts

== Track listing ==
※ Track in Bold is the title track of the album.

No.	Title	Lyrics	Music	Arrangement	Length
1.	"**Beep Beep**" (**뛰뛰빵빵**)	Brave Brothers	Brave Brothers, Elephant Kingdom	Brave Brothers, Elephant Kingdom, Lee Jung-min	3:28
2.	"Broken Heart" (끝난 건가요)	Lee Chang-geun, Lee Seung-woo	Lee Kyu-hoon	Lee Kyu-hoon, Song Young-min, Lee Ki-yong	3:52
3.	"Hello" (여보세요)	Team One Sound	Team One Sound	Team One Sound	3:05
4.	"Hello Mello"	Jung IlHoon, Lee Minhyuk	Jung IlHoon, Lee Minhyuk, Big SsanCho	Seo Jae-woo, Big SsanCho	3:40
5.	"Never Ending (Melody)" (끝나지 않을 (Melody))	Im Hyunsik, Lee Changsub, Seo Eunkwang	Im Hyunsik, Lee Changsub, Seo Eunkwang	Seo Jae-woo	4:21

== Charts ==
Title	Peak positions
Title	KOR Gaon
"Beep Beep"	1

== Sales and certifications ==
Chart	Amount
Gaon physical sales	36,114

== Release history ==
Country	Date	Distributing label	Format
South Korea	February 17, 2014	Cube Entertainment; Universal Music	CD, Digital download
Worldwide	February 17, 2014	Cube Entertainment; Universal Music	CD, Digital download

Release date for worldwide may vary in different countries
