= I Mean =

- Cover of I Mean

EP by BTOB
- Released: October 12, 2015
- Recorded: 2015
- Genre: K-pop; ballad
- Language: Korean
- Label: Cube Entertainment; Universal Music Group

BTOB chronology
Complete (2015)	I Mean (2015)	Remember That (2016)

Singles from I Mean
- 1. "Way Back Home" Released: October 12, 2015

Music videos
- "집으로 가는 길 (Way Back Home)" on YouTube

I Mean is the seventh EP of the South Korean boy group BTOB. It was released on October 12, 2015, with the lead single "Way Back Home". The EP contains 6 tracks. It features the group's strong vocal skills. This also leads to BTOB's growing success as they achieved their first music broadcast trophy through this album.

== Release ==
In September 2015, BTOB announced their upcoming comeback with another ballad track that will be released in October. They released their album and drama-themed music video for lead single "Way Back Home" with member Ilhoon as the main actor.

== Promotion ==
BTOB held their first music show performance on the 163rd episode of Show Champion, performing both "Heart Attack" and "Way Back Home". On some music show performances, Sungjae wasn't able to perform with the group due to drama that took place during filming. His parts were replaced by other members. They concluded their promotions on Inkigayo after a 5-week promotion.

== Track listing ==
※ Bold track title means it is the title track in the album.

No.	Title	Lyrics	Music	Arrangement	Length
1.	"Last Day"	Lee Chang-sub, Seo Jae-woo	Seo Jae-woo, Jussifer, Davion Farris of The Pensouls, Joe J. Lee "Kairos"	Seo Jae-woo	3:38
2.	"집으로 가는 길" (Way Back Home)	Son Yeong-jin, Jo Sung-ho	Son Yeong-jin, Jo Sung-ho	Son Yeong-jin, Jo Sung-ho	4:01
3.	"심장어택" (Heart Attack)	Seo Jae-woo, Song Yong-bae, Lee Minhyuk, Jung Il-hoon, Peniel	Seo Jae-woo, Song Yong-bae	Seo Jaewoo	4:05
4.	"Neverland" (feat. G.NA)	Jung Ilhoon, Lee Minhyuk, Peniel	Jung Ilhoon	Jung Ilhoon	3:44
5.	"나 빼고 다 늑대" (All Are Wolves Except Me)	Seo Jaewoo, Jung Il-hoon, Lee Minhyuk	Seo Jaewoo, Jung Il-hoon	Seo Jaewoo	3:50
6.	"여기 있을게" (I'll Be Here)	Im Hyunsik, EDEN	Im Hyunsik, EDEN	Megatone	4:42
Total length:					23:59

== Chart performance ==
Title	Peak positions	Sales
Title	KOR Gaon	Sales
I Mean	2	KOR: 46,638+

== Music program wins ==
Program	Date	Episode
Show Champion (MBC Music)	October 21	164
