= Born to Beat =

EP by BTOB
- Released: March 21, 2012
- Recorded: 2012
- Genres: K-pop, dance-pop
- Length: 11:57; 26:52 (Asia Special Edition)
- Language: Korean
- Labels: Cube Entertainment; Universal Music Group
- Producer: Hong Seung Seong

BTOB chronology
| Born to Beat (2012) | Press Play (2012) |

Singles from Born to Beat
- 1. "Insane" Released: April 3, 2012

Alternative Cover
- Asia Special Edition cover

Singles from Born to Beat (Asia Special Edition)
- 1. "Father" Released: May 3, 2012; 2. "Irresistible Lips" Released: May 23, 2012

Music videos
- "비밀(Insane)" on YouTube
- "아버지(Father)" on YouTube
- "그 입술을 뺏었어(Irresistible Lips)" on YouTube

Born to Beat (BTOB) is an EP by South Korean boy group BtoB under United Cube Entertainment.

== Background and release ==
In March 2012, BtoB held their Premium Launching Show with two title tracks, "Imagine" (a ballad track) and "Insane" (a dance track). BtoB's debut songs as rookies are double title compositions that are represented as connected stories of different genres that showcases each of their own charms, which shows BtoB's strategy in presenting their various musical capabilities.

The first title track, "Insane", has been produced by Seo Jae Woo, who has composed songs for other Cube artists such as 4minute and Beast.

"Imagine," the second track, is a ballad.

On March 20, 2012, a teaser for title track "Insane" was released on YouTube. On the same day, the group also released "Imagine", the second title track after "Insane", and on March 22, 2012, the group made their live performance debut on M! Countdown.

On May 23, 2012, a special edition of the album title Born To Beat (Asia Special Edition) was released, with an addition of two tracks which includes a new single titled "Irresistible Lips" and another track from their previous single titled "Father" and on the same day the music video for the track "Irresistible Lips" was also released.

== Promotion ==
The group began their promotions for the album on 22 March 2012, on Mnet's M!Countdown followed by other various music programs like Music Bank, Inkigayo and Music Core respectively.

== Track listing ==
| No. | Title | Lyrics | Music | Arrangement | Length |
|---|---|---|---|---|---|
| 1. | "Born to Beat" | Seo Jewoo, Seo Yongbae, Jung Ilhoon | Seo Jewoo, Seo Yongbae, Jung Ilhoon | Seo Jewoo, Seo Yongbae | 1:25 |
| 2. | "Insane" (비밀; Bimil) | Seo Jewoo, Seo Yongbae, Jung Ilhoon, Lee Minhyuk | Seo Jewoo, Seo Yongbae, Jung Ilhoon | Seo Jewoo, Seo Yongbae | 3:37 |
| 3. | "Imagine" | Seo Jewoo, Seo Yongbae, Jung Ilhoon | Seo Jewoo, Seo Yongbae, Jung Ilhoon | Seo Jewoo, Seo Yongbae | 3:44 |
| 4. | "Monday to Sunday" | Dru Scott, Fredrik Thomander, Jörgen Elofsson | Dru Scott, Fredrik Thomander, Jörgen Elofsson | Dru Scott, Fredrik Thomander, Jörgen Elofsson | 3:11 |
| Total length: | | | | | 11:57 |

Asia Special Edition track list
| No. | Title | Lyrics | Music | Arrangement | Length |
|---|---|---|---|---|---|
| 1. | "Born to Beat" | Seo Jewoo, Seo Yongbae, Jung Ilhoon | Seo Jewoo, Seo Yongbae, Jung Ilhoon | Seo Jewoo, Seo Yongbae | 1:25 |
| 2. | "Irresistible Lips" (그 입술을 뺏었어; Geu Ibsuleul Ppaeseosseo) | Wheesung | Seo Jewoo, Seo Yongbae | Seo Jewoo, Seo Yongbae | 3:48 |
| 3. | "Insane" (비밀; Bimil) | Seo Jewoo, Seo Yongbae, Jung Ilhoon, Lee Minhyuk | Seo Jewoo, Seo Yongbae, Jung Ilhoon | Seo Jewoo, Seo Yongbae | 3:37 |
| 4. | "Imagine" | Seo Jewoo, Seo Yongbae, Jung Ilhoon | Seo Jewoo, Seo Yongbae, Jung Ilhoon | Seo Jewoo, Seo Yongbae | 3:44 |
| 5. | "Monday to Sunday" | Dru Scott, Fredrik Thomander, Jörgen Elofsson | Dru Scott, Fredrik Thomander, Jörgen Elofsson | Dru Scott, Fredrik Thomander, Jörgen Elofsson | 3:11 |
| 6. | "Father" (아버지; Abeoji) | Seo Jewoo, Seo Yongbae | Seo Jewoo, Seo Yongbae | Seo Jewoo, Seo Yongbae | 3:42 |
| 7. | "Irresistible Lips" (Instrumental) (그 입술을 뺏었어; Geu Ibsuleul Ppaeseosseo) | | Seo Jewoo, Seo Yongbae | Seo Jewoo, Seo Yongbae | 3:48 |
| 8. | "Insane" (Instrumental) (비밀; Bimil) | | Seo Jewoo, Seo Yongbae, Jung Ilhoon | Seo Jewoo, Seo Yongbae | 3:38 |
| Total length: | | | | | 26:52 |

Asia Special Edition – DVD track list
| No. | Title | Length |
|---|---|---|
| 1. | "Insane" (Music video) | 3:52 |
| 2. | "Irresistible Lips" (Music video) | 3:58 |
| 3. | "Father" (Music video) | 3:43 |

== Charts ==
=== Albums chart ===
| Chart | Peak position |
|---|---|
| Gaon Weekly album chart | 3 |
| Gaon Weekly domestic album chart | 3 |
| Gaon Monthly album chart | 16 |

=== Sales and certifications ===
| Chart | Amount |
|---|---|
| Gaon physical sales | 9,483 |
