= Summer Color My Girl =

Single by BTOB
- Released: August 19, 2015
- Recorded: 2015
- Genre: J-pop
- Label: Kiss Entertainment

BTOB singles chronology
"'Future (Tomorrow)'" (2015)	"Summer Color My Girl" (2015)	"'Dear Bride'" (2016)

Music video
- 夏色 MY GIRL (Full Ver.) on YouTube

Summer Color My Girl (Japanese: 夏色 MY GIRL; Natsuiro My Girl) is the third Japanese single of the South Korean boy group, BTOB. It is the second original Japanese single of the group, and was released on August 19, 2015.

The single is available physically with 3 Regular Edition type, and 1 Limited Edition type. Each regular edition CDs, contains the lead single and different b-sides while the limited CD+DVD edition contains a photo booklet and the making DVD.

== Track list ==
Limited Edition CD
No.	Title	Length
1.	"夏色 MY GIRL" (Natsuiro MY GIRL)	4:10
2.	"Blowin'"	4:48
3.	"Evidence"	3:42
4.	"サヨナラを繰り返して" (Repeat Goodbye)	5:45
5.	"夏色 MY GIRL" (Instrumental)	4:09
Total length:		22:26

Limited Edition DVD
No.	Title	Length
1.	"Natsuiro MY GIRL PV"
2.	"PV Making"

Regular Edition - Type A
No.	Title	Length
1.	"夏色 MY GIRL" (Natsuiro MY GIRL)	4:10
2.	"Blowin'"	3:42
3.	"夏色 MY GIRL" (Instrumental)	4:09
4.	"Blowin'" (Instrumental)	3:42
Total length:		13:35

Regular Edition - Type B
No.	Title	Length
1.	"夏色 MY GIRL" (Natsuiro MY GIRL)	4:10
2.	"Evidence"	4:38
3.	"夏色 MY GIRL" (Instrumental)	4:09
4.	"Evidence" (Instrumental)	4:38
Total length:		15:45

Regular Edition - Type B
No.	Title	Length
1.	"夏色 MY GIRL" (Natsuiro MY GIRL)	4:10
2.	"サヨナラを繰り返して" (Repeat Goodbye)	5:45
3.	"夏色 MY GIRL" (Instrumental)	4:09
4.	"サヨナラを繰り返して" (Instrumental)	5:45
Total length:		19:49

== Chart performance ==
Released	Oricon Chart	Peak	Debut sales	Sales total
August 19, 2015	Daily Singles Chart	5	-	91,513+
August 19, 2015	Weekly Singles Chart	4	76,634	91,513+
August 19, 2015	Monthly Singles Chart	7	89,537	91,513+
August 19, 2015	Yearly Singles Chart	70	91,513	91,513+
