= L.U.V =

Single by BTOB
- Released: June 15, 2016
- Recorded: 2016
- Genre: Ballad
- Label: Kiss Entertainment

BTOB singles chronology
"'Dear Bride'" (2016)	"L.U.V" (2016)

L.U.V is the fifth Japanese single of the South Korean boy group, BTOB. It was released on June 15, 2016 by Kiss Entertainment. The single album also peaked at #1 on the Daily and Weekly Oricon Singles Chart, making it BTOB's first Japanese single to reach number 1. It sold more than 62,000 copies on its first day, and 77,000 copies on its first week. The song also reached number-one on the Billboard Japan Hot 100.

The album is available in 5 different versions— a Limited Edition CD+DVD version, 3 Regular Edition CDs with different B-sides, and individual CD covers of each member.

== Track listing ==
Limited Edition CD
No.	Title	Length
1.	"L.U.V"	4:42
2.	"Jump!"	4:05
3.	"Go for it"	3:29
4.	"Beyond the Time"	5:22
5.	"L.U.V Instrumental"	4:42
Total length:		22:20

Limited Edition DVD
No.	Title	Length
1.	"L.U.V PV"
2.	"PV Making"

Regular Edition - Type A
No.	Title	Length
1.	"L.U.V"	4:42
2.	"Jump!"	4:05
3.	"L.U.V Instrumental"	4:42
4.	"Jump! Instrumental"	4:05
Total length:		17:34

Regular Edition - Type B
No.	Title	Length
1.	"L.U.V"	4:42
2.	"Go for it"	3:29
3.	"L.U.V Instrumental"	4:42
4.	"Go for it Instrumental"	3:29
Total length:		16:22

Regular Edition - Type C
No.	Title	Length
1.	"L.U.V"	4:42
2.	"Beyond the Time"	5:22
3.	"L.U.V Instrumental"	4:42
4.	"Beyond the Time Instrumental"	5:22
Total length:		20:08

== Chart performance ==
Released	Oricon Chart	Peak	Debut sales	Sales total
June 15, 2016	Daily Singles Chart	1	62,131	78,836
June 15, 2016	Weekly Singles Chart	1	76,591	78,836
June 15, 2016	Monthly Singles Chart	4	78,836	78,836
June 15, 2016	Yearly Singles Chart	67	78,836	78,836
