= The Winter's Tale (EP) =

- Cover of The Winter's Tale

EP by BTOB
- Released: December 22, 2014
- Recorded: 2014
- Genre: K-pop
- Length: 19:43
- Language: Korean
- Label: Cube Entertainment; Universal Music Group

BTOB chronology
| Move (2014) | The Winter's Tale (2014) | Complete (2015) |

Singles from The Winter's Tale
- 1. "You Can Cry" Released: December 3, 2014; 2. "울면 안 돼 (The Winter's Tale)" Released: December 22, 2014

Music videos
- "울면 안 돼 (The Winter's Tale)" on YouTube
- "울어도 돼 (You Can Cry)" on YouTube

The Winter's Tale is a special Christmas album and also the sixth EP of the South Korean boy group BTOB. They pre-released the single "You Can Cry" on December 3, 2014 and released the title track "The Winter's Tale" after. The title track is written by members Jung Il-hoon and Im Hyun-sik.

The song "Drink!" was banned at MBC because it contained suggestive lyrics for excessive drinking.

== Track list ==
※ Track in bold is the title track in the album.

| No. | Title | Lyrics | Music | Arrangement | Length |
|---|---|---|---|---|---|
| 1. | "You Can Cry" (울어도 돼) | Jerry L., Han Hee-jun, Lee Minhyuk, Jung Il-hoon | Jerry L., Han Hee-jun | Jerry L. | 3:38 |
| 2. | "**울면 안 돼**" (The Winter's Tale) | Im Hyunsik, Jung Ilhoon, Lee Minhyuk, Peniel | Im Hyunsik, Jung Ilhoon | Son Yeong-jin, Im Hyunsik, Jung Ilhoon | 4:18 |
| 3. | "한 모금" (One Sip) | GOOD LIFE, Lee Minhyuk, Jung Ilhoon, Peniel | GOOD LIFE | GOOD LIFE | 3:51 |
| 4. | "마셔!" (Drink!) | Jung Ilhoon, Lee Minhyuk, Peniel | Jung Ilhoon, Im Hyunsik | Jung Ilhoon | 4:11 |
| 5. | "크리스마스라서" (Because It's Christmas) | Son Yeong-jin, FERDY, Jung Ilhoon, Lee Minhyuk, Peniel | Son Yeong-jin, FERDY | Seo Jaewoo | 3:47 |
| Total length: | | | | | 19:43 |
