= Press Play (BtoB EP) =

EP by BtoB
- Released: September 12, 2012
- Recorded: 2012
- Genres: K-pop, dance-pop, R&B, new jack swing
- Length: 21:21
- Language: Korean
- Labels: Cube Entertainment; Universal Music Group

BtoB chronology
Born to Beat (2012)	Press Play (2012)	Thriller (2013)

Singles from Press Play
- 1. "Wow" Released: September 12, 2012; 2. "Lover Boy" Released: October 18, 2012

Music videos
- "WOW" on YouTube
- "사랑밖에 난 몰라 (Lover Boy)" on YouTube

Press Play is the second mini-album by the South Korean boy band BtoB. It was released on September 12, 2012, with the track "Wow" as the lead single. "Lover Boy" was chosen as the follow-up single and will be used to promote the EP starting on October 18.

== Background ==
A teaser image confirming the release was revealed by Cube Entertainment's Twitter account on September 4, 2012, along with the release date of the EP, September 12, the title track of the EP, titled "Wow" and the EP's name, titled Press Play. The image has a pop art theme and also shows the person on the photo making the word 'WOW' with their hands and mouth. It was later revealed that the person on the photo is the member Sungjae. On September 5, an audio teaser of the song "Wow" was released on BtoB's YouTube account. One day later, on September 6, Cube revealed teaser photos of the group together, as well solo shots of every member. On September 7, a teaser from the music video of "Wow" was released. On September 12, the EP and music video of "Wow" were released digitally simultaneously.

== Concept ==
According to Cube Entertainment, the concept of Press Play is an "idea of the "play" button on a cassette tape player and the meaning of the title is derived from the indication that "BtoB play time is about to begin"".

== Composition ==
The EP consists of six new tracks. The first track of the EP, "Press Play", was written and composed by Seo Yong-bae, Seo Jae-woo and by the singer G.NA, who also features on the song. The song is described as a song that has a literal meaning of enjoying music by pressing the play button. The second track, "Wow", also first title track of the EP, was written and composed by Kim Do-hyun, Seo Yong-bae and Seo Jae-woo. The song is described to be of "new jack swing" style, which was popular during the '90s, and incorporates the solid vocal and rap skills of the members. The third track, "Lover Boy" (Korean: 사랑밖에 난 몰라), chosen as the follow-up track of promotions, was also written and composed by Kim Do-hyun, Seo Yong-bae and Seo Jae-woo. The song is described to also have the '90's retro sound embedded in the track. The fourth track, "U & I", was written by Hwang Sung-jin and composed by Lee Joo-hyung and Lim Sang-hyuk. It is described to demonstrate a sentimental, yet innocent teen-age love story. The fifth track, "Stand Up", was written by Gum and composed by Choi Yong-chan. It is described to inspire and give strength to all listeners who are looking forward to a better tomorrow. The sixth and last track of the EP, "My Girl", was written and composed by Triple A. It is described to be filled with BtoB's distinct vocal color accompanied by the sound of an acoustic guitar.

== Promotions ==
The promotions of the EP with the track "Wow" started on September 13, on Mnet's music show M! Countdown. The song was also promoted on the shows Music Bank, Music Core, Inkigayo, Show Champion and SBS MTV The Show. A song titled "Dream", not included on the EP, was used on the comeback week of performances as an interlude for the performance of "Wow". The current last performance of "Wow" was on SBS' Inkigayo, on October 14. The group started promoting the song "Lover Boy" on October 18, on Mnet's M! Countdown.

== Track listing ==
No.	Title	Lyrics	Music	Arrangement	Length
1.	"Press Play" (featuring G.NA)	Seo Yong-bae, Seo Jae-woo, G.NA	Seo Yong-bae, Seo Jae-woo	Seo Yong-bae, Seo Jae-woo	3:20
2.	"WOW"	Kim Do-hyun, Seo Yong-bae, Seo Jae-woo	Kim Do-hyun, Seo Yong-bae, Seo Jae-woo	Kim Do-hyun, Seo Yong-bae, Seo Jae-woo	3:38
3.	"Lover Boy" (사랑밖에 난 몰라; Salangbakke Nan Molla)	Kim Do-hyun, Seo Yong-bae, Seo Jae-woo, Jung Il-hoon	Kim Do-hyun, Seo Yong-bae, Seo Jae-woo	Kim Do-hyun, Seo Yong-bae, Seo Jae-woo	3:30
4.	"U & I"	Hwang Sung-jin	Lee Joo-hyung, Lim Sang-hyuk	Lee Joo-hyung, Lim Sang-hyuk	3:22
5.	"Stand Up"	Gum	Choi Yong-chan	Choi Yong-chan	3:41
6.	"My Girl"	Triple A	Triple A	Triple A	3:54
Total length:					21:21

== Chart performance ==
=== Album chart ===
Chart	Peak position
Gaon Weekly album chart	4
Gaon Monthly album chart	13

=== Sales and certifications ===
Chart	Amount
Gaon physical sales	20,769+

== Release history ==
Country	Date	Format	Label
South Korea	September 12, 2012	Digital download, CD	Cube Entertainment
Worldwide	October 10, 2012	Digital download	Cube Entertainment
