= Thriller (EP) =

- Cover of Thriller

EP by BTOB
- Released: September 9, 2013
- Recorded: 2013
- Genres: K-pop, dance-pop
- Length: 21:23
- Language: Korean
- Labels: Cube Entertainment; Universal Music Group

BTOB chronology
Press Play (2012)	Thriller (2013)	Beep Beep (2014)

Singles from Thriller
- 1. "When I Was Your Man" Released: August 28, 2013; 2. "Thriller" Released: September 4, 2013

Music videos
- "스릴러 (Thriller)" on YouTube

Thriller is the third EP released by South Korean boy band, BTOB. It was released on September 9, 2013, consisting a total of 6 tracks with Thriller as title track and the promotional single of the album.

== Background ==
On August 23, 2013, Cube Entertainment released concept pictures for "When I Was Your Man", a pre-release track from the album before the official release with a special music video for the song released a few days later. On September 4, 2013, BTOB uploaded the music video of Thriller on their official YouTube channel and on the same day they performed Thriller and When I Was Your Man on MBC's Show Champion prior to the release date of the EP.

== Composition ==
The EP features a total of 6 tracks with 5 tracks co-written by the members of BTOB themselves and the third track of the EP titled 왜이래 (Why) was composed and co-written by label mate Beast's Lee Gi-kwang.

The EP opens with the first track When I Was Your Man, a classy and soft, laid back track. The song is about a man looking back at a past relationship, and reflecting how different he is now. The second track of the album, Thriller, a dynamic song with a story of a fallen knight coming back to life to finish their mission of saving their princess. It is a song that focuses on that rush they get as they rise from the grave. The third track Why is an R&B influenced track that tells the story of a man who has realized that his lover has no feelings left for him. The fourth track Catch Me is a song that is focused on the feelings one experiences that moment he falls in love. The fifth track Like a Crystal, is a song largely accompanied by an acoustic guitar and the last track Star is a ballad song that samples the bars of the famous nursery rhyme, “Twinkle Twinkle Little Star".

== Track listing ==
※ Track in bold is the title track in the album.

No.	Title	Lyrics	Music	Arrangement	Length
1.	"내가 니 남자였을 때" (When I Was Your Man)	Park Woo-sung, Sora	Park Woo-sung,	Park Woo-sung	3:45
2.	"**스릴러**" (Thriller)	Seo Jae-woo, Seo Yong-bae, Lee Minhyuk, Jung IlHoon	Seo Jae-woo, Seo Yong-bae	Seo Jae-woo, Seo Yong-bae	3:27
3.	"왜이래" (Why)	Lee Gi-kwang, Lim Hyunsik, Lee Minhyuk, Shin Peniel, Jung IlHoon	Lee Gi-kwang, Lim Hyunsik	S. Tiger	3:38
4.	"Catch Me"	Seo Jae-woo, Seo Yong-bae, Lee Minhyuk, Jung IlHoon	Seo Jae-woo, Seo Yong-bae	Seo Jae-woo, Seo Yong-bae, Lee Minhyuk, Jung IlHoon	3:31
5.	"크리스탈같이" (Like a Crystal)	Choi Yong-chan, Lee Minhyuk, Shin Peniel, Jung IlHoon	Choi Yong-chan	Choi Yong-chan	3:09
6.	"별" (Star)	Lim Hyunsik, Lee Minhyuk, Jung IlHoon	Lim Hyunsik	Kim Tae-ho, Son Young-jin	3:47
Total length:					21:23

== Charts ==
Title	Peak positions		
Title	KOR Gaon	TWN G-Music	TWN East Asian
"Thriller"	3	16	3

== Release history ==
Country	Date	Distributing label	Format
South Korea	September 9, 2013	Cube Entertainment; Universal Music	CD, Digital download
Worldwide	September 9, 2013	Cube Entertainment; Universal Music	CD, Digital download

Release date for worldwide may vary in different countries
