= Dear Bride =

Single by BTOB
- Released: February 24, 2016
- Recorded: 2016
- Genre: Ballad
- Label: Kiss Entertainment

BTOB singles chronology
"Summer Color MY GIRL" (2015)	"Dear Bride" (2016)	"L.U.V" (2016)

Dear Bride is the fourth Japanese single of the South Korean boy group, BTOB. It peaked at number 2 on the weekly Oricon Singles Chart, selling almost 100,000 copies on the first week.

== Album information ==
On January 13, 2016, BTOB released the information and track list for their upcoming Japanese single. The single is physically available in 3 regular CD types and a CD+DVD limited-edition version. The music video, starring member Changsub, for the lead single was released on February 14, 2016. The group promoted the single on Japan from mid-February to early March.

== Track listing ==
Limited Edition CD
No.	Title	Length
1.	"Dear Bride"	4:49
2.	"Sky's Tears" (涙色の空)	5:48
3.	"Because We Can Meet Again" (また会えるから)	5:52
4.	"Always and Forever" (ずっとずっと)	5:03
5.	"Dear Bride" (Instrumental)	4:48
Total length:		26:42

Limited Edition DVD
No.	Title	Length
1.	"Dear Bride PV"
2.	"PV Making"

Regular Edition - Type A
No.	Title	Length
1.	"Dear Bride"
2.	"Sky's Tears" (涙色の空)
3.	"Dear Bride" (Instrumental)
4.	"Sky's Teasers" (Instrumental)

Regular Edition - Type B
No.	Title	Length
1.	"Dear Bride"
2.	"Because We Can Meet Again" (また会えるから)
3.	"Dear Bride" (Instrumental)
4.	"Because We Can Meet Again" (Instrumental)

Regular Edition - Type C
No.	Title	Length
1.	"Dear Bride"
2.	"Always and Forever" (ずっとずっと)
3.	"Dear Bride" (Instrumental)
4.	"Always and Forever" (Instrumental)

== Chart performance ==
Released	Oricon Chart	Peak	Debut sales	Sales total
February 24, 2016	Daily Singles Chart	2	79,298	110,794
February 24, 2016	Weekly Singles Chart	2	94,230	110,794
February 24, 2016	Monthly Singles Chart	3	94,230	110,794
February 24, 2016	Yearly Singles Chart	55	110,794	110,794
