= Move (EP) =

- Cover of Move

EP by BtoB
- Released: September 29, 2014
- Recorded: 2014
- Genre: K-pop; dance-pop
- Language: Korean
- Label: Cube Entertainment; Universal Music Group

BtoB chronology
| Beep Beep (2014) | Move (2014) | The Winter's Tale (2014) |

Singles from Move
- 1. "You're So Fly" Released: September 29, 2014

Music videos
- "넌 감동이야 (You’re So Fly)" on YouTube

Move is the fifth EP by South Korean boy band BtoB. It was released on September 29, 2014, consisting of a total of five tracks and a bonus track, with "You're So Fly" as the title track and promotional single of the album.

== Background ==
On September 17, 2014, Cube Entertainment announced on BtoB's official page that BtoB would have a comeback with their 5th mini-album entitled Move. The group started releasing individual photo teasers on September 20, 2014. Each member's teaser was released by hour. They revealed the track listing for the album on the 22nd. It was announced that there would be five tracks and one bonus track. Track #4 was listed as having a featured mystery singer that was later revealed to be Joo. An audio teaser was later on released on Cube Entertainment's official SoundCloud on September 24. There were also two music video teasers that were released on the 23rd and the 25th. The official music video was released on September 29, 2014.

== Composition ==
The lead single "You're So Fly", written by Tenzo and Tasco, is about a guy singing a serenade to a girl who he just fell in love with. Powerful beats and a simple melody makes the song fun and attractive. The music video brings out the song's upbeat and bright vibe even more by having Some&Sam's casts starring it. From hip-hop to electronic music, the album contains various genres of music and fans can expect to hear BtoB's member's own creation as well. "Hope You're Doing Fine" is a song reminiscing the days with a guy's first love. R&B sound and comforting guitar sound will surely make it a song for the fall. Moreover, in "Happening", the bright-up-beats puts a smile on listener's faces listening to BtoB's fun and energetic voices. Minhyuk, Peniel and Ilhoon united for "You're My Angel" which also features Joo's signature voice. "I Don't Know" is a song sung by Eunkwang, Changsub, Hyunsik and Sungjae, touching all the heart-broken people out there. Lastly, "Shake It!" is a disco tune written by Hyunsik and Ilhoon which was included as a bonus track for CD buyers.

== Promotions ==
BtoB had their first comeback stage on the October 3 episode of Music Bank and continued with a month of promotions. On September 19, it was also announced that after BtoB's promotions concluded, they would hold their very first solo concert, Hello Melody, that would be held at the Olympic Hall in Songpagu, Seoul on October 31 and November 1.

== Track list ==
Move tracklisting
| No. | Title | Lyrics | Music | Arrangement | Length |
|---|---|---|---|---|---|
| 1. | "넌 감동이야" (Neonkamdongiya; You're So Fly) | Tenzo and Tasco; Lee Minhyuk; Ilhoon; Peniel | Tenzo and Tasco | Tenzo and Tasco | 3:27 |
| 2. | "잘 지내겠죠" (Jaljinaegetyo; Hope You're Doing Fine) | E.One; Minhyuk; Ilhoon | E.One | E.One | 3:46 |
| 3. | "Happening" | Min Yeon-jae; Minhyuk; Ilhoon; Peniel | Seo Jae-woo; Brian Lee | Seo Jae-woo | 3:21 |
| 4. | "넌 나의 천사 (feat. Joo)" (Neonnauicheonsa; You're My Angel) | Ilhoon; Minhyuk; Peniel | Ilhoon | Son Young-jin; Big Ssancho | 4:00 |
| 5. | "몰라" (Molla; I Don't Know) | Hyunsik | Hyunsik | Hyunsik | 3:50 |
| Total length: | | | | | 18:21 |

Bonus track
| No. | Title | Lyrics | Music | Arrangement | Length |
|---|---|---|---|---|---|
| 1. | "Shake It!" | Hyunsik; Ilhoon | Hyunsik; Ilhoon | Hyunsik; Ilhoon | 3:14 |

== Sales and certifications ==
Sales for Move
| Region | Sales |
|---|---|
| South Korea | 19,463+ |

== Release history ==
Release history and formats for Move
| Region | Date | Format | Label |
|---|---|---|---|
| South Korea | September 29, 2014 | CD; digital download | Cube Entertainment; Universal Music |
| Various | September 29, 2014 | CD; digital download | Cube Entertainment; Universal Music |
