= List of songs written and produced by Yong Jun-hyung =

Yong Jun-hyung is a South Korean singer-songwriter, rapper, record producer, and actor. He is a member of the South Korean boy group Highlight.

== Beast/Highlight albums ==
| Year | Album | Artist | Song | Lyrics | | Music | |
| Year | Album | Artist | Song | Credited | With | Credited | With |
|---|---|---|---|---|---|---|---|
| 2009 | Beast Is the B2ST | BEAST | "Beast Is the B2ST" | Yes | BEAST | No | Shin Sa Dong Tiger, Choi Gyu Seong |
| 2009 | Beast Is the B2ST | BEAST | "Bad Girl" | Yes | BEAST, Lee Sang Ho, Shin Sa Dong Tiger | No | Lee Sang Ho, Shin Sa Dong Tiger |
| 2009 | Beast Is the B2ST | BEAST | "Mystery" | Yes | Lee Sang Ho, Kang Ji Won, Shin Sa Dong Tiger | No | Lee Sang Ho, Kang Ji Won, Shin Sa Dong Tiger |
| 2009 | Beast Is the B2ST | BEAST | "Yet" | Yes | Shin Sa Dong Tiger, Jeon Hye Won | No | Shin Sa Dong Tiger |
| 2009 | Beast Is the B2ST | BEAST | "Oasis" | Yes | Hwang Song Jin, Kim Ki Bum, Kang Ji Won | No | Kim Ki Bum, Kang Ji Won |
| 2010 | Shock of the New Era | BEAST | "Just Before Shock" | Yes | Shin Sa-dong Tiger, Choi Kyu-seong | No | Shin Sa Dong Tiger |
| 2010 | Shock of the New Era | BEAST | "Shock" | Yes | Lee Sang-ho, Shin Sa-dong Tiger | No | Lee Sang-ho, Shin Sa-dong Tiger |
| 2010 | Shock of the New Era | BEAST | "Special" | Yes | Lee Sang-ho, Shin Sa-dong Tiger | No | Lee Sang-ho, Shin Sa-dong Tiger |
| 2010 | Shock of the New Era | BEAST | "Say No" | Yes | "hitman" bang, Baek Chan | No | "hitman" bang, pdogg |
| 2010 | Mastermind | BEAST | "Mastermind" | Yes | Shinsadong Tiger | No | Shin Sa Dong Tiger |
| 2010 | Mastermind | BEAST | "Soom" | Yes | Shinsadong Tiger, Choi Gyusung, Rado | No | Shinsadong Tiger, Choi Gyusung |
| 2010 | Lights Go On Again | BEAST | "Lights Go on Again" | Yes | Hong Seungsung, DA9297, Shinsadong Tiger | No | DA9297, Shinsadong Tiger |
| 2010 | Lights Go On Again | BEAST | "I Like You the Best" | Yes | Shinsadong Tiger | No | Shinsadong Tiger, Lee Chaekyu, Jeongoon |
| 2010 | Lights Go On Again | BEAST | "Lightless" | Yes | Rado, Shinsadong Tiger, Choi Kyusung | No | Rado, Shinsadong Tiger, Choi Kyusung |
| 2010 | Lights Go On Again | BEAST | "I'm Sorry" | Yes | Rado, Choi Kyusung | No | Rado, Choi Kyusung |
| 2010 | My Story | BEAST | "Lights Go On Again (Full Version)" | Yes | Hong Seungsung, DA9297, Shinsadong Tiger | No | DA9297, Shinsadong Tiger |
| 2010 | My Story | BEAST | "Thank To" (Junhyung & Yoseob) | Yes | Yang Yo-seob | Yes | Yang Yo-seob, Shinsadong Tiger |
| 2011 | Fiction and Fact | BEAST | "The Fact" | Yes | Shinsadong Tiger, Choi Gyu Seong | No | Shinsadong Tiger, Choi Gyu Seong |
| 2011 | Fiction and Fact | BEAST | "Fiction" | Yes | Shinsadong Tiger, Choi Gyu Seong | No | Shinsadong Tiger, Choi Gyu Seong |
| 2011 | Fiction and Fact | BEAST | "Back to You" | Yes | Seo Yong-bae, Seo Jae-woo | No | Seo Yong-bae, Seo Jae-woo |
| 2011 | Fiction and Fact | BEAST | "You" | Yes | Choi Gyu-seong, Rado | No | Choi Gyu-seong, Rado |
| 2011 | Fiction and Fact | BEAST | "Freeze" | Yes | Kim Tae-joo (Good Life) | Yes | Kim Tae-joo (Good Life) |
| 2011 | Fiction and Fact | BEAST | "Virus" | Yes | Nang-ee, Beom-ee | No | Nang-ee, Beom-ee |
| 2011 | Fiction and Fact | BEAST | "On Rainy Days" | Yes | Choi Gyu-seong | No | Choi Gyu-seong |
| 2011 | Fiction and Fact | BEAST | "Lightless" (Unplugged Version) | Yes | Shinsadong Tiger, Choi Gyu-seong, Rado | No | Shinsadong Tiger, Choi Gyu-seong |
| 2011 | Fiction and Fact | BEAST | "Fiction" (Orchestra Version) | Yes | Shinsadong Tiger, Choi Gyu-seong | No | Shinsadong Tiger, Choi Gyu-seong |
| 2012 | Midnight Sun | BEAST | "Midnight" | Yes | Shinsadong Tiger, Choi Gyu-seong | No | Shinsadong Tiger, Choi Gyu-seong |
| 2012 | Midnight Sun | BEAST | "Not Me" | Yes | Choi Gyu-Seong | No | Choi Gyu-Seong |
| 2012 | Midnight Sun | BEAST | "When I Miss You" | Yes | Choi Gyu-Seong | No | Choi Gyu-Seong |
| 2012 | Midnight Sun | BEAST | "The Day You Rest" | Yes | Kim Tae-joo (Good Life) | No | Kim Tae-joo (Good Life) |
| 2012 | Midnight Sun | BEAST | "Dream Girl" | Yes | Kim Tae-joo (Good Life) | No | Kim Tae-joo (Good Life) |
| 2013 | Hard to Love, How to Love | BEAST | "Intro" | Yes | —N/a | Yes | Kim Tae-joo (Good Life) |
| 2013 | Hard to Love, How to Love | BEAST | "Shadow" | Yes | Kim Tae-joo (Good Life) | Yes | Kim Tae-joo (Good Life) |
| 2013 | Hard to Love, How to Love | BEAST | "How to Love" | Yes | Kim Tae-joo (Good Life) | Yes | Kim Tae-joo (Good Life) |
| 2013 | Hard to Love, How to Love | BEAST | "Be Alright" | Yes | Kim Tae-joo (Good Life) | Yes | Kim Tae-joo (Good Life) |
| 2013 | Hard to Love, How to Love | BEAST | "I'm Sorry" | Yes | Kim Tae-joo (Good Life) | Yes | Kim Tae-joo (Good Life) |
| 2013 | Hard to Love, How to Love | BEAST | "Will You Be Alright?" | Yes | Kim Tae-joo (Good Life) | Yes | Kim Tae-joo (Good Life) |
| 2013 | Hard to Love, How to Love | BEAST | "You're Bad" | Yes | Kim Tae-joo (Good Life) | Yes | Kim Tae-joo (Good Life) |
| 2013 | Hard to Love, How to Love | BEAST | "Encore" | Yes | Kim Tae-joo (Good Life) | Yes | Kim Tae-joo (Good Life) |
| 2014 | Good Luck | BEAST | "We Up" | Yes | Kim Tae-joo (Good Life) | Yes | Kim Tae-joo (Good Life) |
| 2014 | Good Luck | BEAST | "Good Luck" | Yes | Kim Tae-joo (Good Life) | Yes | Kim Tae-joo (Good Life) |
| 2014 | Good Luck | BEAST | "Dance With U" | Yes | Kim Tae-joo (Good Life) | Yes | Kim Tae-joo (Good Life) |
| 2014 | Good Luck | BEAST | "No More" | Yes | Kim Tae-joo (Good Life) | Yes | Kim Tae-joo (Good Life) |
| 2014 | Good Luck | BEAST | "Sad Movie" (Korean Ver.) | Yes | Kim Tae-joo (Good Life) | Yes | Kim Tae-joo (Good Life) |
| 2014 | Good Luck | BEAST | "History" | Yes | Lee Gi-kwang, Noday | No | Lee Gi-kwang, Noday |
| 2014 | Time | BEAST | "12:30" | Yes | Kim Tae-joo (Good Life) | Yes | Kim Tae-joo (Good Life) |
| 2014 | Time | BEAST | "Drive" | Yes | Kim Tae-joo (Good Life) | Yes | Kim Tae-joo (Good Life) |
| 2014 | Time | BEAST | "It's All Good" | Yes | Kim Tae-joo (Good Life) | Yes | Kim Tae-joo (Good Life) |
| 2014 | Time | BEAST | "Close My Eyes" | Yes | Kim Tae-joo (Good Life) | Yes | Kim Tae-joo (Good Life) |
| 2014 | Time | BEAST | "Stay" | Yes | Kim Tae-joo (Good Life) | Yes | Kim Tae-joo (Good Life) |
| 2014 | Time | BEAST | "So Hot" | Yes | Lee Gi-kwang, Noday | No | Lee Gi-kwang, Noday |
| 2014 | BEAST Japan Best | BEAST | "Sad Movie" (Japanese Ver.) | Yes | Kim Tae-joo (Good Life), Rina Moon | Yes | Kim Tae-joo (Good Life) |
| 2014 | BEAST Japan Best | BEAST | "Adrenaline" | Yes | Tomoi Higuchi, Rui Momota, Kenji Tamai | No | Rui Momota |
| 2014 | Kimi Wa Dou? | BEAST | "'Kimi Wa Dou?" | Yes | Kim Tae-joo (Good Life), Chihiro Kurosu | Yes | Kim Tae-joo (Good Life) |
| 2014 | Kimi Wa Dou? | BEAST | "'One Day" (Japanese Ver.) | Yes | Kim Tae-joo (Good Life), Chihiro Kurosu | Yes | Kim Tae-joo (Good Life) |
| 2015 | Ordinary | BEAST | "Oh Honey" | Yes | Lee Gi-kwang, Noday, Chloe | No | Lee Gi-kwang, Noday, Chloe |
| 2015 | Ordinary | BEAST | "YeY" | Yes | Kim Tae-joo (Good Life) | Yes | Kim Tae-joo (Good Life) |
| 2015 | Ordinary | BEAST | "Gotta Go to Work" | Yes | Kim Tae-joo (Good Life) | Yes | Kim Tae-joo (Good Life) |
| 2015 | Ordinary | BEAST | "Suite Room" | Yes | Kim Tae-joo (Good Life) | Yes | Kim Tae-joo (Good Life) |
| 2015 | Ordinary | BEAST | "See You There" | Yes | Kim Tae-joo (Good Life) | Yes | Kim Tae-joo (Good Life) |
| 2015 | Ordinary | BEAST | "Take It All" | Yes | Kim Tae-joo (Good Life) | Yes | Kim Tae-joo (Good Life) |
| 2015 | Ordinary | BEAST | "One Day" (Korean Ver.) | Yes | Kim Tae-joo (Good Life) | Yes | Kim Tae-joo (Good Life) |
| 2015 | Ordinary | BEAST | "I Think I Love You" (Korean Ver.) | Yes | Kim Tae-joo (Good Life) | Yes | Kim Tae-joo (Good Life) |
| 2016 | Guess Who? | BEAST | "Only One" | No | Shikata | Yes | Kim Tae-joo (Good Life) |
| 2016 | Guess Who? | BEAST | "YeY" (Japanses Ver.) | Yes | Shikata, Aidan | Yes | Kim Tae-joo (Good Life) |
| 2016 | Guess Who? | BEAST | "Guess Who?" | Yes | Shikata, Aidan | Yes | Kim Tae-joo (Good Life) |
| 2016 | Guess Who? | BEAST | "All Is in U" | Yes | Shikata, Aidan | Yes | Davii |
| 2016 | Day/Night | BEAST | "Freaking Cute" | Yes | Shikata, Aidan | Yes | Davii |
| 2016 | Highlight | BEAST | "Highlight" | Yes | — | Yes | Kim Tae-joo (Good Life) |
| 2016 | Highlight | BEAST | "Ribbon" | Yes | — | Yes | Kim Tae-joo (Good Life) |
| 2016 | Highlight | BEAST | "When I..." | Yes | — | Yes | Kim Tae-joo (Good Life) |
| 2016 | Highlight | BEAST | "Found You" (Junhyung) | Yes | — | Yes | Kim Tae-joo (Good Life) |
| 2016 | Highlight | BEAST | "Butterfly" | Yes | — | Yes | Davii |
| 2016 | Highlight | BEAST | "Practice" | Yes | Yang Yo-seob, Gyuberlake | No | Yang Yo-seob, Gyuberlake |
| 2016 | Highlight | BEAST | "Curious" | Yes | Lee Gi-kwang, Noday | No | Lee Gi-kwang, Noday |
| 2016 | Highlight | BEAST | "Lullaby" | Yes | Lee Gi-kwang, Noday, Chloe | No | Lee Gi-kwang, Noday, Chloe |
| 2016 | Highlight | BEAST | "I'll Give You My All" (Dongwoon) | No | Son Dong-woon | Yes | Kim Tae-joo (Good Life), Davii |
| 2017 | Can You Feel It? | HIGHLIGHT | "Plz Don't Be Sad" | Yes | Kim Tae-joo (Good Life) | Yes | Kim Tae-joo (Good Life) |
| 2017 | Can You Feel It? | HIGHLIGHT | "It's Still Beautiful" | Yes | Kim Tae-joo (Good Life) | Yes | Kim Tae-joo (Good Life) |
| 2017 | Can You Feel It? | HIGHLIGHT | "Can You Feel It?" | Yes | — | Yes | Kim Tae-joo (Good Life) |
| 2017 | Can You Feel It? | HIGHLIGHT | "The Beginning" | Yes | Yang Yo-seob, Gyuberlake | No | Yang Yo-seob, Gyuberlake |
| 2017 | Can You Feel It? | HIGHLIGHT | "Dangerous" | Yes | Lee Gi-kwang, Kwon Phillip | No | Lee Gi-kwang, Kwon Phillip |
| 2017 | Calling You | HIGHLIGHT | "Calling You" | Yes | Kim Tae-joo (Good Life) | Yes | Kim Tae-joo (Good Life) |
| 2017 | Calling You | HIGHLIGHT | "Sleep Tight" | Yes | — | Yes | Kim Tae-joo (Good Life) |
| 2017 | Celebrate | HIGHLIGHT | "Celebrate" | Yes | — | Yes | Kim Tae-joo (Good Life) |
| 2017 | Celebrate | HIGHLIGHT | "Can Be Better" | Yes | Kim Tae-joo (Good Life) | Yes | Kim Tae-joo (Good Life) |
| 2017 | Celebrate | HIGHLIGHT | "Take On Me" | Yes | — | Yes | Kim Tae-joo (Good Life) |
| 2017 | Celebrate | HIGHLIGHT | "Who Am I" | Yes | — | Yes | Kim Tae-joo (Good Life) |
| 2017 | Celebrate | HIGHLIGHT | "Love Like This" | Yes | Lee Gi-kwang, Kim Tae-sung, Joo Chanyang | No | Lee Gi-kwang, Kim Tae-sung, Joo Chanyang, Secret Weapon |
| 2018 | Outro | HIGHLIGHT | "Loved" | Yes | Kim Tae-joo (Good Life) | Yes | Kim Tae-joo (Good Life) |
| 2018 | Outro | HIGHLIGHT | "Take Care" | Yes | Kim Tae-joo (Good Life) | Yes | Kim Tae-joo (Good Life) |
| 2018 | Outro | HIGHLIGHT | "Leave Me Alone" (Junhyung & Gikwang) | Yes | Lee Gi-kwang | Yes | Lee Gi-kwang, Kim Taejoo (Good Life) |
| 2018 | Outro | HIGHLIGHT | Nightmare (Dujun) | Yes | — | Yes | Kim Taejoo (Good Life) |

== Solo work ==
| Year | Album | Artist | Song | Lyrics | | Music | |
| Year | Album | Artist | Song | Credited | With | Credited | With |
|---|---|---|---|---|---|---|---|
| 2012 | Non album-singles | Junhyung | "Living Without You" | Yes | Rado | No | Rado |
| 2013 | Flower | Junhyung | "Nothing Is Forever" | Yes | — | Yes | Kim Tae-joo (Good Life) |
| 2013 | Flower | Junhyung | "Flower" | Yes | Kim Tae-joo (Good Life) | Yes | Kim Tae-joo (Good Life) |
| 2013 | Flower | Junhyung | "Slow" | Yes | Kim Tae-joo (Good Life) | Yes | Kim Tae-joo (Good Life) |
| 2013 | Flower | Junhyung (ft. G.NA) | "Anything" | Yes | Kim Tae-joo (Good Life) | Yes | Kim Tae-joo (Good Life) |
| 2013 | Flower | Junhyung (ft. Yoseob) | "Caffeine" (Piano version) | Yes | Kim Tae-joo (Good Life) | Yes | Kim Tae-joo (Good Life) |
| 2016 | Non album-singles | Junhyung (ft. Davii) | "After This Moment" | Yes | — | Yes | Davii |
| 2017 | Wonder If | Junhyung (ft. Heize) | "Wonder If" | Yes | Heize | Yes | Kim Tae-joo (Good Life), Heize |
| 2017 | Wonder If | Junhyung | "Too Much Love Kills Me" | Yes | — | Yes | Kim Tae-joo (Good Life) |
| 2018 | Goodbye 20's | Junhyung (ft. 10cm) | "Sudden Shower" | Yes | — | Yes | Kim Tae-joo (Good Life) |
| 2018 | Goodbye 20's | Junhyung (ft. Baek A-yeon) | "Collection" | Yes | — | Yes | Kim Tae-joo (Good Life) |
| 2018 | Goodbye 20's | Junhyung | "Intro" | Yes | — | Yes | Kim Tae-joo (Good Life) |
| 2018 | Goodbye 20's | Junhyung | "Between Calm and Passion" | Yes | — | Yes | Kim Tae-joo (Good Life) |
| 2018 | Goodbye 20's | Junhyung | "I Love You" | Yes | — | Yes | Kim Tae-joo (Good Life) |
| 2018 | Goodbye 20's | Junhyung | "Feel Ur Love" | Yes | — | Yes | Kim Tae-joo (Good Life) |
| 2018 | Goodbye 20's | Junhyung | "I'm Fine" | Yes | — | Yes | Kim Tae-joo (Good Life) |
| 2018 | Goodbye 20's | Junhyung | "Goodbye 20's" | Yes | — | Yes | Kim Tae-joo (Good Life) |
| 2018 | Goodbye 20's | Junhyung | "Go Away" | Yes | Kim Tae-joo (Good Life) | Yes | Kim Tae-joo (Good Life) |

== Other works ==
| Year | Album | Artist | Song | Lyrics | | Music | |
| Year | Album | Artist | Song | Credited | With | Credited | With |
|---|---|---|---|---|---|---|---|
| 2010 | Faddy Robot Foundation | Faddy Robot (with Various Artists) | "Faddy Robot" | No | Shinsadong Tiger | Yes | Vasco, Verbal Jint, Cho Jun-seob, Shinsadong Tiger, Outsider, Lee Sang-cheol, Jooseok |
| 2011 | Bubble Pop! | Hyuna (ft. Junhyung, G.NA) | "A Bitter Day" | Yes | Choi Kyu-sung | No | Choi Kyu-sung |
| 2011 | Non album-single | Kim Wan-sun (ft. Junhyung) | "Be Quit!" | Yes | Kim Tae-joo (Good Life) | Yes | Kim Tae-joo (Good Life), Shinsadong Tiger |
| 2011 | Me, Too Flower! OST | BEAST (Junhyung, Yoseob and Dongwoon) | "Dreaming" | Yes | Kim Hyun-woo | No | Kim Hyun-woo, Gong Doo-hyung |
| 2011 | I Am the Future | Jang Woo-hyuk | "Time Is Over" | Yes | Shinsadong Tiger | Yes | Shinsadong Tiger |
| 2012 | Non album-single | BEAST | "I Knew It" | Yes | Rado | No | Rado |
| 2012 | The First Collage | Yang Yo-seob | "Caffeine" | Yes | Kim Tae-joo (Good Life) | Yes | Kim Tae-joo (Good Life) |
| 2012 | The First Collage | Yang Yo-seob | "Look At Me Now" | Yes | Kim Tae-joo (Good Life) | Yes | Kim Tae-joo (Good Life) |
| 2012 | The First Collage | Yang Yo-seob | "You Don't Know" | Yes | Kim Tae-joo (Good Life) | Yes | Kim Tae-joo (Good Life) |
| 2012 | Hippity Hop | EXID | "Think About" | Yes | Kim Tae-joo (Good Life), LE | Yes | Kim Tae-joo (Good Life) |
| 2012 | Une Année | Apink | "I Got You" | Yes | Kim Tae-joo (Good Life), Shinsadong Tiger | Yes | Kim Tae-joo (Good Life), Shinsadong Tiger |
| 2012 | Feel Brand New Part.2 | Eru (ft. Junhyung) | "I Hate You" | Yes | Double Sidekick | No | Double Sidekick |
| 2013 | Iris II OST | BEAST | "Black Paradise" | Yes | Kim Tae-joo (Good Life) | Yes | Kim Tae-joo (Good Life) |
| 2013 | Non album-single | C-Clown & ALi | "It Was Like That Then" | Yes | Kim Tae-joo (Good Life), Rome, T.K | Yes | Kim Tae-joo (Good Life) |
| 2013 | Non album-single | Shin Ji-hoon | "Right There" | Yes | Kim Tae-joo (Good Life) | Yes | Kim Tae-joo (Good Life) |
| 2013 | Non album-single | Junhyung & LE, Feeldong | "You Got Some Nerve" | Yes | LE, Electroboyz, Chakun, Brave Brothers | No | Brave Brothers, Elephant Kingdom |
| 2013 | Non album-single | Lyn (ft. Junhyung) | "Glass Heart" | Yes | Lyn, Double Sidekick | No | Double Sidekick |
| 2014 | The Winter's Tale | BTOB | "One Sip" | Yes | Kim Tae-joo (Good Life), Lee Min-hyuk, Jung Il-hoon, Peniel | Yes | Kim Tae-joo (Good Life) |
| 2014 | Non album-single | MOSE (ft. Hanhae) | "Let's Not Meet Again" | Yes | Kim Tae-joo (Good Life), Hanhae | Yes | Kim Tae-joo (Good Life) |
| 2014 | Non album-single | Megan Lee (ft. Junhyung) | "8dayz" | Yes | Kim Tae-woo | No | Andreas Bartels, Rudger Schramm |
| 2014 | Non album-single | Park Shin-hye (ft. Junhyung) | "My Dear" | Yes | Park Shin-won, Park Shin-hye | No | Park Shin-won, Kim Chang-rak |
| 2015 | Let's Eat 2 OST | Yang Yo-seob | "Why Don't You Know" | Yes | Kim Tae-joo (Good Life) | Yes | Kim Tae-joo (Good Life) |
| 2015 | Yong-pal OST | Junhyung & Heo Ga-yoon | "Nightmare" | Yes | Tony, Denis Seo, Lee Hwan-ok | No | Tony, Denis Seo, Lee Hwan-ok |
| 2015 | Non album-single | Noel | "In the End" | Yes | — | Yes | Choi Gyu-wan |
| 2015 | WondaLand | MFBTY & Junhyung | "Let It Go" | Yes | Yoon Mi-rae, Tiger JK, Bizzy | No | Yoon Mi-rae, Bizzy, Smells, Reno, Park Jae-seon |
| 2015 | Kimishika | Son Dong-woon | "Preludio" | No | Son Dong-woon | Yes | Kim Tae-joo (Good Life) |
| 2015 | Kimishika | Son Dong-woon | "Kimi Shika" | No | Son Dong-woon | Yes | Kim Tae-joo (Good Life) |
| 2015 | Kimishika | Son Dong-woon | "Amasugiru You" | No | Son Dong-woon | Yes | Kim Tae-joo (Good Life), Davii |
| 2016 | Sketch | Hyomin | "Still" | Yes | — | No | Hyomin, Mokujin's |
| 2016 | Non album-single | Postmen | "Can't Let You Go" | Yes | — | Yes | Davii |
| 2016 | Non album-single | Heize | "Don't Come Back" | Yes | Heize | No | Brothers |
| 2017 | Non album-single | Junhyung, Luna and Doni | "Tell Me It's Okay" | Yes | Doni | Yes | Kim Tae-joo (Good Life) |
| 2017 | Kriesha Chu | Kriesha Chu (ft. Junhyung) | "I Wish It Were You " | Yes | Kim Tae-joo (Good Life) | Yes | Kim Tae-joo (Good Life) |
| 2017 | Kriesha Chu | Krisha Chu | "Trouble" | Yes | Kim Tae-joo (Good Life) | Yes | Kim Tae-joo (Good Life) |
| 2017 | ONE | Lee Gi-kwang | "What You Like" | Yes | Kim Tae-joo (Good Life) | Yes | Kim Tae-joo (Good Life) |
| 2017 | Colour | Sanchez (ft. Junhyung) | "Mesmerised" | Yes | Sanchez | No | Sanchez, Stoner Tunes, Jang Yeon-woo |
| 2017 | From. VICTON | Victon | "Remember Me" | Yes | Kim Tae-joo (Good Life), Do Han-se | Yes | Kim Tae-joo (Good Life) |
| 2017 | From. VICTON | Victon | "Remember Me" (Acoustic Ver.) | Yes | Kim Tae-joo (Good Life), Do Han-se | No | Kim Tae-joo (Good Life) |
| 2018 | Non album-single | Ko Sung-min | "Don't Let Me Know" | Yes | Kim Tae-joo (Good Life) | Yes | Kim Tae-joo (Good Life) |
| 2018 | Non album-single | Kim Jo-han | "Still In Love" | Yes | — | No | Crush, 0Channel, Kim Jo-han |
