= Outro (EP) =

EP by Highlight
- Released: November 20, 2018
- Recorded: 2018
- Genres: K-pop; ballad
- Length: 20:39
- Labels: Around Us Entertainment; RCA; Kakao M

Highlight chronology
Celebrate (2017)	Outro (2018)	The Blowing (2021)

Singles from Outro
- 1. "Take Care" Released: October 29, 2018; 2. "Loved" Released: November 20, 2018

Outro is the twelfth extended play by South Korean boy band, Highlight, released on November 20, 2018, by Around Us Entertainment and distributed by Kakao M. The album features vocals from member Doojoon, who previously enlisted on August 23, 2018, and is also the last Highlight release to feature member Junhyung, who would depart on March 14, 2019, as a witness in the Burning Sun scandal.

The album was preceded by the single, "Take Care," on October 29, 2018. The title track, "Loved," was released on November 20, 2018, alongside the album.

== Background ==
Highlight released their single, "Take Care," on October 29, 2018. The group had their final broadcast before enlistment on You Hee-yeol's Sketchbook on November 2, 2018, after which Around Us Entertainment announced that they would be releasing a "special album," in the form of an extended play, which would include a track with Doojoon, recorded pre enlistment.

== Promotion ==
The album was promoted through an eponymous solo concert, held on November 24 and 25.

== Reception ==
Outro was met with positive reviews, with a peak chart of #4 on the GAON, and over 47,000 copies sold. Billboard described the album as a "poignant album," describing title track, "Loved," as "an evocative dance track that blends Highlight's reflective vocals with rhythmic strings, and is dominated by a bright, EDM choral drop with soaring violin riffs," while also comparing it to their earlier songs, saying "The darker vibes recall some of the act’s earlier songs like 2014’s “12:30” and 2016’s “Ribbon,” both released as BEAST, emphasizing their tender vocals and affinity for dance music all in one."

== Tracklist ==
No.	Title	Lyrics	Music	Arrangement	Length
1.	"Loved" (사랑했나봐)	Good Life (Yong Jun Hyung, Kim Tae Joo)	Good Life (Yong Jun Hyung, Kim Tae Joo)	Good Life (Yong Jun Hyung, Kim Tae Joo)	3:33
2.	"Wind" (바람) (Yang Yo-seob & Son Dong-woon)	Yang Yo-seob, Son Dong-woon, Gyuberlake	Yang Yo-seob, Son Dong-woon, Gyuberlake	Yang Yo-seob, Gyuberlake	3:11
3.	"Leave Me Alone" (내버려 둬) (Junhyung & Gikwang)	Yong Jun Hyung, Lee Gi-kwang	Good Life (Yong Jun Hyung, Kim Tae Joo), Lee Gi-kwang	Good Life (Yong Jun Hyung, Kim Tae Joo), Lee Gi-kwang	3:19
4.	"Nightmare" (오늘같은 밤이면) (Doojoon)	Yong Jun Hyung	Good Life (Yong Jun Hyung, Kim Tae Joo), Lee Gi-kwang	Kim Tae Joo	3:25
5.	"Take Care" (잘 지내줘)	Good Life (Yong Jun Hyung, Kim Tae Joo)	Good Life (Yong Jun Hyung, Kim Tae Joo)	Good Life (Yong Jun Hyung, Kim Tae Joo)	3:38
6.	"Loved" (사랑했나봐) (Inst.)		Good Life (Yong Jun Hyung, Kim Tae Joo)	Good Life (Yong Jun Hyung, Kim Tae Joo)	3:33
Total length:					20:39
