= Daydream (Highlight album) =

- Digital and streaming cover

Studio album by Highlight
- Released: March 21, 2022
- Genre: K-Pop
- Length: 32:20
- Language: Korean
- Labels: Around Us; Genie Music; Stone Music

Highlight chronology
The Blowing (2021)	Daydream (2022)	After Sunset (2022)

Singles from Daydream
- 1. "Daydream" Released: March 21, 2022

Daydream is the fourth studio album by South Korean boy group Highlight. It was released on March 21, 2022, by Around US Entertainment and distributed by Kakao Entertainment. The album contains ten tracks, with the lead single sharing its name with the album. Three versions were released, titled Before the Dream, In the Dream, and After the Dream. The album reached number 4 on the Gaon (now Circle) Album Chart.

== Background and album ==
On March 2, 2022, News1 announced that Highlight would be making a surprise comeback in the same month, ten months after the release of their post-enlistment EP, The Blowing. The news was later confirmed by Around US Entertainment on March 7 to be the group's first full album release following their rebrand to their current name Highlight, and their first full album in five years. Its release date was announced to be on March 21, 2022. The group also released a highlight film to showcase snippets of the ten tracks which were partially co-written by members Lee Gikwang and Son Dongwoon.

Daydream is described to be a "medium tempo pop-dance song with lyrical vocals and a delicately tuned arrangement." The lyrics are a confession of love that speak from the perspective of someone experiencing heartbreak, wanting to stay in their eternal daydream where they remain with their lover. Leader Yoon Dujun added that "[Daydream] goes well with spring. The lyrics are sentimental. It is a hybrid song that fulfills both moods."

== Track listing ==
Daydream track listing
No.	Title	Lyrics	Music	Arrangement	Length
1.	"DAYDREAM"	KZ, Kim Tae-yeong, HOFF, danke (lalalala studio)	KZ, Kim Tae-yeong, HOFF	KZ, Kim Tae-yeong	3:13
2.	"밤안개 (Night Fog)"	Lee Gikwang, Noday	Lee Gikwang, Noday, Riskypizza	Noday, Riskypizza	2:38
3.	"Don't Leave"	VO3E, Lee Gikwang, Kim Jeung-jung, ZNEE	VO3E, Lee Gikwang, Frederik Jyll	VO3E	3:08
4.	"PLAY"	Sooyoon, Lee Gikwang	Big Sancho (Yummy Tone), Moon Kim, Lee Gikwang, Kim So-ming (Yummy Tone)	Big Sancho (Yummy Tone), Kim So-ming (Yummy Tone)	3:06
5.	"시선 (Our Eyes)"	Son Dongwoon	Son Dongwoon, Lee Yonggyu, Shin Sungjin	Son Dongwoon, Lee Yonggyu, Shin Sungjin	3:27
6.	"될대로 되라고 해 (Whatever)"	NOD, Park Sol, Gyuberlake	NOD, Park Sol, Gyuberlake, Moon Kim	NOD	3:18
7.	"Seven Wonders"	VINCENZO, Daniel Kim, Jeremy G (Future Sound)	VINCENZO, Any Masingga, Fuxxy, Daniel Kim, Jeremy G (Future Sound)	VINCENZO, Any Masingga	3:09
8.	"Classic"	Lee Gikwang, Noday, Gyuberlake	Lee Gikwang, Noday, Gyuberlake, WONJUN	Lee Gikwang, Noday, Gyuberlake, l.vin	3:42
9.	"Lovely Day"	AnoTHeR	AnoTHeR, Track9	Track9	3:08
10.	"All My Life"	KZ, Kim Tae-yeong	KZ, Kim Tae-yeong, Mike Watson, Jonas Ekdahl	KZ, Kim Tae-yeong	3:26
Total length:					32:20

== Charts ==
Chart	Peak position	Sales
Circle Weekly Album Chart	4	KOR 91,577
Circle Monthly Album Chart	15	KOR 91,577
