= Celebrate (EP) =

EP by Highlight
- Released: October 16, 2017
- Recorded: 2017
- Language: Korean
- Label: Around Us; LOEN

Highlight chronology
Can You Feel It? (2017)	Celebrate (2017)	Outro (2018)

Singles from Celebrate
- 1. "Can Be Better" Released: October 16, 2017

Celebrate is the eleventh extended play by South Korean boy group Highlight. It was released on October 16, 2017 by Around Us Entertainment and distributed by LOEN Entertainment.

The album was released to commemorate and celebrate the eighth anniversary of the group's debut. This marks the third time the group has released two albums in one year, following Shock of the New Era and Mastermind in 2010; and Good Luck and Time in 2014. According to Gaon Chart, as of the end of December 2017, the album has sold a cumulative total of 113,154 copies.

The album consists of six tracks, including the lead single "Can Be Better".

== Track listing ==
Credits are adapted from Naver.

No.	Title	Lyrics	Music	Arrangement	Length
1.	"Celebrate"	Yong Jun-hyung	Good Life (Yong Jun-hyung, Kim Tae-joo)	Good Life (Yong Jun-hyung, Kim Tae-joo)	3:04
2.	"Can Be Better" (어쩔 수 없지 뭐; eojjeol su eobsji mwo)	Good Life (Yong Jun-hyung, Kim Tae-joo)	Good Life (Yong Jun-hyung, Kim Tae-joo)	Good Life (Yong Jun-hyung, Kim Tae-joo)	2:59
3.	"Take On Me"	Yong Jun-hyung	Good Life (Yong Jun-hyung, Kim Tae-joo)	Kim Tae-joo	3:26
4.	"Who Am I"	Yong Jun-hyung	Good Life (Yong Jun-hyung, Kim Tae-joo)	Kim Tae-joo	3:30
5.	"Love Like This"	Lee Gi-kwang, Kim Tae-sung, Chan-yang, Yong Jun-hyung	Lee Gi-kwang, Kim Tae-sung, Chan-yang, Secret Weapon	Secret Weapon	3:04
6.	"Can Be Better" (instrumental)		Good Life (Yong Jun-hyung, Kim Tae-joo)	Good Life (Yong Jun-hyung, Kim Tae-joo)	2:59
Total length:					19:02

== Chart performance ==
Chart	Peak position	Sales
Gaon Weekly album chart	2	KOR: 113,154
Gaon Monthly album chart	5	KOR: 113,154
Gaon Yearly album chart	31	KOR: 113,154
Oricon Weekly album chart	49	KOR: 113,154
