= The Blowing =

- Digital and streaming cover

EP by Highlight
- Released: May 3, 2021
- Genre: K-pop
- Length: 20:29
- Language: Korean
- Labels: Around Us; Genie Music; Stone Music

Highlight chronology
Outro (2018)	The Blowing (2021)	Daydream (2022)

Singles from The Blowing
- 1. "Not The End (불어온다)" Released: May 3, 2021

The Blowing is the thirteenth extended play by South Korean boy group Highlight. It was released on May 3, 2021, by Around Us Entertainment and contains six songs, including the single "Not The End".

== Background ==
Following the release of their 2018 EP Outro, Highlight went on a three-year hiatus while the members completed their mandatory military service. The Blowing marks the group's first release as a four-member group after the departure of Yong Jung-hyung in 2019.

== Tracklist ==
No.	Title	Lyrics	Music	Arrangement	Length
1.	"Not The End" (불어온다)	Ju Chan-yang (Pollen), Lavin, Lee Gi-kwang	Ju Chan-yang (Pollen), Lavin, Lee Gi-kwang	Ju Chan-yang (Pollen), Lavin	3:39
2.	"Wave"	Seo Ji-eum	KZ, Kim Tae-yeong, HOFF	KZ, Kim Tae-yeong	3:31
3.	"Hey Yeah" (밤이야)	Kim Su-yun, Lee Gi-kwang, Moon Kim	Lee Gi-kwang, Tesung Kim, Moon Kim, NOD, An Seong-chan, Kim Yong-sin	NOD, An Seong-chan, Kim Yong-sin	3:09
4.	"Sorry" (미안)	Door (Yummy Tone)	Park Hae-il (Yummy Tone), Door (Yummy Tone)	Park Hae-il (Yummy Tone)	3:42
5.	"Disconnected"	Vincenzo, Fuxxy, Any Masingga, Charlotte Wilson (THE HUB), Jacob Aaron (THE HUB)	Vincenzo, Fuxxy, Any Masingga, Charlotte Wilson (THE HUB), Jacob Aaron (THE HUB)	Any Masingga	3:11
6.	"Surf"	Son Dong-woon	Son Dong-woon, Sin Seong-jin	Son Dong-woon, Yu Jae-hwan, Sin Seong-jin, Lee Yong-gyu	3:18
Total length:					20:29

Adapted from Around US Entertainment press release.

== Charts ==
Chart (2021)	Peak position
South Korean Albums (Gaon)	2
Japanese Hot Albums (Billboard Japan)	39
Japanese Digital Albums (Oricon)	20
