= Can You Feel It? (EP) =

EP by Highlight
- Released: March 20, 2017
- Genres: K-pop; dance; ballad; R&B; Rock
- Language: Korean
- Labels: Around Us Entertainment; LOEN Entertainment

Highlight chronology
Highlight (2016)	Can You Feel It? (2017)	Celebrate (2017)

Singles from Can You Feel It?
- 1. "It's Still Beautiful" Released: March 13, 2017; 2. "Plz Don't Be Sad" Released: March 20, 2017

Calling You reissue cover

Singles from Calling You
- 1. "Calling You" Released: May 29, 2017

Can You Feel It? is the tenth extended play by South Korean boy group Highlight formerly known as Beast. It was released on March 20, 2017 by Around Us Entertainment and distributed by LOEN Entertainment. This is the first album the group has released since leaving Cube Entertainment, under their rebranded name of Highlight.

The album consists of six new tracks including the lead single "Plz Don't Be Sad" and the pre-release single "It's Still Beautiful".

On May 29, 2017 Highlight released a repackaged version of their ninth extended play album with 2 new songs in addition to the songs from their ninth extended play album Can You Feel It?, including the title track "Calling You".

== Track listing ==
Credits are adapted from Naver.

No.	Title	Lyrics	Music	Arrangement	Length
1.	"Plz Don't Be Sad" (얼굴 찌푸리지 말아요; Eolgul jjipuriji marayo; 'Don't Frown')	Good Life (Yong Jun-hyung, Kim Tae-joo)	Good Life (Yong Jun-hyung, Kim Tae-joo)	Good Life (Yong Jun-hyung, Kim Tae-joo)	3:15
2.	"It's Still Beautiful" (아름답다; Areumdapda; 'Beautiful')	Good Life (Yong Jun-hyung, Kim Tae-joo)	Good Life (Yong Jun-hyung, Kim Tae-joo)	Good Life (Yong Jun-hyung, Kim Tae-joo)	3:45
3.	"The Beginning" (시작; Sijak)	Yang Yo-seob; Gyuberlake; Yong Jun-hyung	Yang Yo-seob; Gyuberlake	Yang Yo-seob; Gyuberlake	3:43
4.	"Dangerous" (위험해; Wiheomhae)	Lee Gi-kwang; Kwon Phillip; Yong Jun-hyung	Lee Gi-kwang; Kwon Phillip	Lee Gi-kwang; Kwon Phillip	4:16
5.	"Can You Feel It?"	Yong Jun-hyung	Good Life (Yong Jun-hyung, Kim Tae-joo)	Good Life (Yong Jun-hyung, Kim Tae-joo)	3:08
6.	"Plz Don't Be Sad" (instrumental)		Good Life (Yong Jun-hyung, Kim Tae-joo)	Good Life (Yong Jun-hyung, Kim Tae-joo)	3:15
Total length:					21:22

Calling You – Repackage
No.	Title	Lyrics	Music	Arrangement	Length
1.	"Plz Don't Be Sad" (얼굴 찌푸리지 말아요)	Good Life (Yong Jun-hyung, Kim Tae-joo)	Good Life (Yong Jun-hyung, Kim Tae-joo)	Good Life (Yong Jun-hyung, Kim Tae-joo)	3:15
2.	"It's Still Beautiful" (아름답다)	Good Life (Yong Jun-hyung, Kim Tae-joo)	Good Life (Yong Jun-hyung, Kim Tae-joo)	Good Life (Yong Jun-hyung, Kim Tae-joo)	3:45
3.	"The Beginning" (시작)	Yang Yo-seob; Gyuberlake; Yong Jun-hyung	Yang Yo-seob; Gyuberlake	Yang Yo-seob; Gyuberlake	3:43
4.	"Dangerous" (위험해)	Lee Gi-kwang; Kwon Phillip; Yong Jun-hyung	Lee Gi-kwang; Kwon Phillip	Lee Gi-kwang; Kwon Phillip	4:16
5.	"Can You Feel It?"	Yong Jun-hyung	Good Life (Yong Jun-hyung, Kim Tae-joo)	Good Life (Yong Jun-hyung, Kim Tae-joo)	3:08
6.	"Calling You"	Good Life (Yong Jun-hyung, Kim Tae-joo)	Good Life (Yong Jun-hyung, Kim Tae-joo)	Good Life (Yong Jun-hyung, Kim Tae-joo)	3:37
7.	"Sleep Tight"	Yong Jun-hyung	Good Life (Yong Jun-hyung, Kim Tae-joo)	Good Life (Yong Jun-hyung, Kim Tae-joo)	3:24
Total length:					25:08

== Chart performance ==
Album	Chart	Peak position	Sales
Can you feel it?	Gaon Weekly album chart	1	KOR: 114,303+; JPN: 4,287
Can you feel it?	Gaon Monthly album chart	2	KOR: 114,303+; JPN: 4,287
Can you feel it?	Gaon Yearly album chart	30	KOR: 114,303+; JPN: 4,287
Can you feel it?	Oricon Weekly album chart	59	KOR: 114,303+; JPN: 4,287
Calling you (repackage album)	Gaon Weekly album chart	2	KOR: 38,454+
Calling you (repackage album)	Gaon Monthly album chart	7	KOR: 38,454+
Calling you (repackage album)	Gaon Yearly album chart	89	KOR: 38,454+
Total			KOR: 152,848+
