= Flower (EP) =

EP by Yong Jun-hyung
- Released: 13 December 2013
- Genre: K-pop; hip hop
- Length: 14:44
- Label: Cube

Singles from Flower
- 1. "Flower" Released: December 13, 2013

Flower is the debut extended play by South Korean singer Yong Jun-hyung, member and rapper of South Korean boy group Beast. The EP was released on December 13, 2013, by Cube Entertainment and consists of five tracks including the title track of the same name, "Flower".

== Track listing ==
No.	Title	Lyrics	Music	Length
1.	"Nothing Is Forever"	Yong Jun-hyung	Yong Jun-hyung, Kim Tae-joo	1:17
2.	"Flower"	Yong Jun-hyung, Kim Tae-joo	Yong Jun-hyung, Kim Tae-joo	3:20
3.	"Anything (featuring G.NA)"	Yong Jun-hyung, Kim Tae-joo	Yong Jun-hyung, Kim Tae-joo	3:26
4.	"Slow"	Yong Jun-hyung, Kim Tae-joo	Yong Jun-hyung, Kim Tae-joo	3:08
5.	"Caffeine (Piano version) (featuring Yang Yo-seob)"	Yong Jun-hyung, Kim Tae-joo	Yong Jun-hyung, Kim Tae-joo	3:33
Total length:				14:44
