= One (Lee Gi-kwang EP) =

EP by Lee Gi-kwang
- Released: September 4, 2017
- Recorded: 2017
- Genre: K-pop
- Language: Korean
- Label: Around Us; RCA Records; LOEN

Lee Gi-kwang chronology
First Episode: A New Hero (2009)	One (2017)

Singles from One
- 1. "What You Like" Released: September 4, 2017

One is the second extended play by Lee Gi-kwang, released on September 4, 2017.

The album consists of eight new tracks including the lead single "What You Like".

== Track listing ==
One track listing
No.	Title	Lyrics	Music	Arrangement	Length
1.	"What You Like"	Good Life (Yong Jun-hyung, Kim Tae-joo)	Good Life (Yong Jun-hyung, Kim Tae-joo)	Good Life (Yong Jun-hyung, Kim Tae-joo)	2:51
2.	"One"	Lee Gi-kwang; Kim Tae-joo)	Lee Gi-kwang; Kim Tae-joo)	Kim Tae-joo	3:04
3.	"Misunderstand" (오해해; ohaehae)	Gi-kwang; Noday; Kwon Philip	Gi-kwang; Noday; Kwon Philip	Noday; Philip	3:01
4.	"Dream" (꿈; kkum; featuring Luizy)	Gi-kwang; Kim Tae-sung; Chan-yang; Luizy	Gi-kwang; Kim Tae-sung; Chan-yang; Secret Weapon	Secret Weapon	3:25
5.	"Look at Me Now"	Gi-kwang; Noday	Gi-kwang; Noday	Noday	3:27
6.	"Trick" (featuring Lil Boi)	Giriboy; Lil Boi	Giriboy	Giriboy	3:29
7.	"Only U"	Gi-kwang; Noday; Chole	Noday; Chole	Noday; Chole	3:33
8.	"What Are U" (니가 뭔데; niga mwonde; CD only)	Gi-kwang; Noday	Gi-kwang; Noday	Noday
Total length:					21:45

== Charts ==
Chart performance for One
Chart (2017)	Peak position
Japanese Albums (Oricon)	171
South Korean Albums (Gaon)	5
