= Yoon Doo-joon =

Korean singer and actor (born 1989)

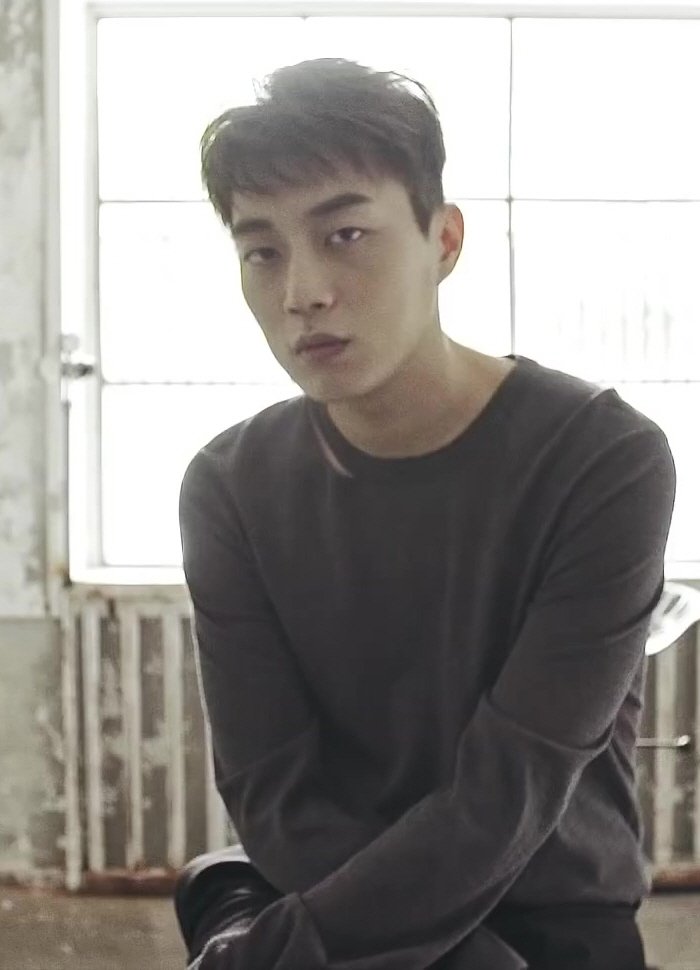
- Yoon in 2016

Background information
- Born: July 4, 1989 (age 37); Goyang, South Korea
- Genre: K-pop
- Occupations: Singer; actor
- Instrument: Vocals
- Years active: 2008–present
- Labels: JYP; Cube; Around Us
- Member of: Highlight

Korean name
- Hangul: 윤두준
- Hanja: 尹斗俊
- RR: Yun Dujun
- MR: Yun Tujun

Yoon Doo-joon (Korean: 윤두준; born July 4, 1989), also known mononymously as Doojoon or Dujun, is a South Korean singer and actor. He is the leader of the South Korean boy group Highlight.

== Early life ==
Yoon Doo-joon was born in Goyang, South Korea on July 4, 1989. His dream of becoming a high school Physical Education teacher changed suddenly during his second year of high school after watching MTV's Big Bang Documentary. His parents and teachers did not agree with him at first, though he pleaded with them to register him for music school and he soon started auditioning to become a singer.

Yoon then became a trainee of JYP Entertainment and was featured in the Mnet documentary Hot Blooded Men, a reality program that shows the preparation for their debut, with 2AM and 2PM, but he was eliminated along the course of the show.

He then moved to Cube Entertainment and was featured as a rapper in AJ's "Wipe the Tears". He later debuted as the leader of Beast. Their journey leading up to debut was showcased in their MTV documentary MTV B2ST.

Yoon graduated from Kyung Hee Cyber University in post-modern musicology. He attended Dongshin University as a student majoring in Broadcast Entertainment, under a full scholarship, along with three other members of Beast.

Yoon enlisted for his mandatory military service as ROK Army on August 24, 2018, and was discharged on April 10, 2020.

== Career ==
=== Group career ===
Yoon debuted as a leader of Beast in 2009. In 2016, he left label Cube Entertainment along with several other members. They have since reformed to promote as Highlight under Around Us Entertainment.

=== Solo career ===
Before his debut with Beast, Yoon auditioned for High Kick Through the Roof and was offered a role in the sitcom, but he turned it down to focus on his music career. A month after his debut, he became a member of the reality-variety series Danbi, a segment part of MBC's Sunday Sunday Night line-up. The show ended with its last broadcast on August 15, 2010.

Yoon was then chosen to model on an advertisement for premium jeans brand Buckaroo along with Shin Se-kyung. He was also featured for G.NA's song "I'll Back Off So You Can Live Better" music video along with fellow Beast member, Junhyung.

Yoon debuted as an actor when he was cast in MBC's daily sitcom More Charming By The Day and All My Love. On December 29, 2010, he was awarded with the Rookie Comedy Award from the 2010 MBC Entertainment Awards for his performance.

In 2013, he featured in spy action drama Iris II. The same year, he starred tvN's slice-of-life drama Let's Eat. He reprised his role in the second season, Let's Eat 2 which aired in 2015. The same year, he starred in the MBC drama special Splash Splash Love.

In 2018, Yoon starred in the romance drama Radio Romance. The same year, he reprised his role in the third season of the Let's Eat franchise.

On April 13, 2020, it was announced that he would be a part of the cast of TvN variety show, 4 Wheeled Restaurant.

On July 27, 2020, Yoon released his first solo mini album, Daybreak.

On May 1, 2021, Highlight's agency Around Us Entertainment announced, "Yoon Doojoon has been confirmed to appear in the drama There is No Goo Pil Soo, which will begin filming in July."

== Discography ==
=== Extended plays ===
Title	Album details	Peak chart positions	Sales
Title	Album details	KOR	Sales
Daybreak	Released: July 27, 2020; Label: Around Us Entertainment; Formats: CD, digital download, streaming	4	KOR: 30,946

=== Singles ===
==== As lead artist ====
Title	Year	Peak chart positions		Album
Title	Year	KOR		Album
Title	Year	Circle	Hot	Album
"Lonely Night"	2020	115	77	Daybreak

==== Collaborations ====
Year	Title	Artist	Album
2011	"Should I Hug or Not" (안을까 말까)	Yong Jun-hyung, Lee Gi-kwang, Yoon Doo-joon	Super Market – the Half (Shinsadong Tiger Project Album)
2011	"Loving U"	Jang Hyun-seung, Yang Yo-seob, Yoon Doo-joon	All My Love OST
2015	"Without You"	Yang Yo-seob, Dongwoon, Yoon Doo-joon	Scholar Who Walks the Night OST

==== As featured artist ====
Year	Title	Artist	Album
2011	"Bon Appetit (Enjoy Your Meal)" (본 아뻬띠 (맛있게 드세요))	Yangpa feat. Yoon Doo-joon	Elegy Nouveau
2011	"Kidult" (키덜트)	Eluphant feat. Yoon Doo-joon	Man on the Earth
2020	"Would you marry me?" (너,나,우리)	Jung Yong-hwa feat. Lee Joon, Yoon Doo-joon, Hwang Kwanghee	Reply Project Vol.1

=== Songwriting credits ===
Year	Album	Artist	Song	Lyrics		Music	
Year	Album	Artist	Song	Credited	With	Credited	With
2009	Beast Is the B2ST	Beast	"Beast Is the B2ST"	Yes	Beast	No	Shinsadong Tiger, Choi Gyu-seong
2009	Beast Is the B2ST	Beast	"Bad Girl"	Yes	Beast, Lee Sang-ho, Shinsadong Tiger	No	Lee Sang-ho, Shinsadong Tiger
2010	My Story	Beast (Yoon & Son Dong-woon)	"When the Door Closes"	Yes	Son Dong-woon	No	Rado

== Filmography ==
=== Film ===
Year	Title	Role	Notes/Ref.
2012	Marrying the Mafia 5 – Return of the Family	Jang Young-min	
2013	Iris2: The Movie	Seo Hyeon-woo	
2022	Honest Candidate 2	Kang Yeon-joon	Special appearance

=== Television series ===
Year	Title	Role	Notes/Ref.
2010	More Charming By the Day	Yoon Doo-joon	Recurring role
2010–2011	All My Love for You	Yoon Doo-joon	Recurring role
2011	A Thousand Kisses	Yoon Ki-joon	Cameo
2011	Living Among the Rich	Yoon Doo-joon	Cameo
2013	Iris II: New Generation	Seo Hyun-woo	Supporting role
2013–2014	Let's Eat	Goo Dae-young	Lead role
2015	Let's Eat 2	Goo Dae-young	Lead role
2015	Splash Splash Love	King Lee-do	2 episode drama special
2016	Bring It On, Ghost	Goo Dae-young	Cameo
2017	Because This Is My First Life	Oscar	Cameo
2018	Radio Romance	Ji Su-ho	Lead role
2018	Let's Eat 3	Goo Dae-young	Lead role
2022	Never Give Up	Jung Seok	Lead role

=== Reality show ===
Year	Title	Network	Role	Notes
2008	Hot Blooded Men	Mnet	Cast	with 2PM and 2AM

=== Variety shows ===
Year	Title	Role	Notes/Ref.
2009–2010	Only One Secret Danbi	Cast	
2014	Cool Kiz on the Block: Soccer	Cast	
2014	I am a Man	Guest	with BEAST (Episode 11)
2015	Law of the Jungle - Samoa	Cast	Episode 186-193
2015	Let's Eat with Friends	Cast	Season 2
2016–2018	Battle Trip	Contestant	with Sul Min-seok (Episode 1) with Son Dong-woon (Episode 52-53) with Lee Gi-kwang (Episode 81-82)|
2017	Mr. Baek: The Homemade Food Master 3	Cast	
2017	Living Together in Empty Room	Cast	with Lim Ju-eun and DinDin (Episodes 20–22)
2017	Raid the Convenience Store	MC	
2017	Carefree Travelers	Guest	Swiss Edition; Episode 10-12
2018	Ball Show Lee Young Pyo	Cast	
2020	4 Wheeled Restaurant	Cast	Season 4
2021	Racket Boys	Cast Member	
2023	Great Guide	Tour customers	

=== Hosting ===
Year	Title	Network	Notes/Ref.
2016	Hello Friends: Special	KBS2	one part episode
2017	Raid the Convenience Store	tvN	Co-hosted along with Lee Soo-geun

== Awards and nominations ==
Year	Award	Category	Nominated work	Result	Ref.
2010	MBC Entertainment Awards	Rookie Comedy Award	All My Love & More Charming By the Day	Won	
2015	tvN go Awards	Rising Actor Award	Let's Eat	Won	
2016	tvN10 Awards	Romantic-Comedy King	Let's Eat 2	Nominated	
2016	tvN10 Awards	Best Kiss Award (with Seo Hyun-jin)	Let's Eat 2	Nominated	
2018	3rd Asia Artist Awards	Popularity Award - Actor	—N/a	Nominated	
2018	KBS Drama Awards	Best Couple Award (with Kim So-hyun)	Radio Romance	Nominated	
