= Ordinary (EP) =

EP by Beast
- Released: July 27, 2015
- Genres: K-pop; Dance-pop; R&B
- Length: 21:16
- Language: Korean
- Labels: Cube Entertainment; Universal Music Group

Beast chronology
Time (2014)	Ordinary (2015)	Highlight (2016)

Singles from Ordinary
- 1. "Gotta Go To Work (일하러 가야 돼)" Released: July 20, 2015; 2. "YeY (예이)" Released: July 27, 2015

Ordinary is the ninth extended play by South Korean boy group Beast. It was released on July 27, 2015, by Cube Entertainment and distributed by Universal Music Group. According to Gaon Chart, as of the end of December 2015, the album has sold a cumulative total of 87,524 copies.

This was the group's final release with Hyunseung.

== Track listing ==
All tracks are written by Good Life (Yong Jun-hyung, Kim Tae-joo).

No.	Title	Notes	Length
1.	"YeY" (예이)		3:34
2.	"Gotta Go To Work" (일하러 가야 돼)		3:18
3.	"Suite Room" (스위트 룸)		3:37
4.	"See You There" (그곳에서)		3:47
5.	"Take It All" (가져가)		3:48
6.	"Oh Honey"	Lyrics: Lee Gi-kwang, Chloe, Noday, Yong Jun-hyung; Music: Lee Gi-kwang, Chloe, Noday	3:22
Total length:			21:16

Bonus track (CD only)
No.	Title	Length
7.	"I Think I Love You (Korean ver.)"	3:28
8.	"One Day (Korean ver.)"	3:51

== Chart performance ==
Chart	Peak position	Sales
Gaon Weekly album chart	1	KOR: 87,524+
Gaon Monthly album chart	7	KOR: 87,524+
Gaon Yearly album chart	27	KOR: 87,524+
