= The First Collage =

EP by Yang Yo-seob
- Released: November 26, 2012
- Recorded: 2012
- Genre: K-pop; R&B
- Label: Cube
- Producer: Yong Jun-hyung

Yang Yo-seob chronology
The First Collage (2012)	White (2018)

Singles from The First Collage
- 1. "Caffeine" Released: November 26, 2012

The First Collage is the debut extended play by South Korean singer Yang Yo-seob. It was released on November 26, 2012 by Cube Entertainment and consists of five tracks including the title track "Caffeine".

== Release ==
On November 19 idol group member Yong Jun-hyung made an announcement on Twitter of a mysterious track list but did not provide any further explanation, leading many fans to believe it as his solo project debut. The album was officially announced on November 21, 2012, titled "The First Collage", and Yong Jun-hyung will actually act as a producer for his fellow group member Yoseob. A series of MV still teasers were released in the next few days followed by the music video teaser, released November 23. To date, it has sold 53,754 copies.

== Track listing ==
All music is composed by Yong Jun-hyung

The First Collage
No.	Title	Lyrics	Music	Length
1.	"Look At Me Now"	Yong Jun-hyung, Kim Tae-joo	Yong Jun-hyung, Kim Tae-joo	03:07
2.	"Caffeine" (Title track)	Yong Jun-hyung, Kim Tae-joo	Yong Jun-hyung, Kim Tae-joo	03:37
3.	"Just Do As You Always Did"	Jeon Hae-Seong	Jeon Hae-Seong	03:17
4.	"Although I"	E.One	E.One	04:07
5.	"You Don't Know"	Yong Jun-hyung, Kim Tae-joo	Yong Jun-hyung, Kim Tae-joo	03:20

== Chart performance ==
=== Album chart ===
Chart	Peak chart position
Gaon Weekly album chart	2
Gaon Weekly domestic album chart	2
Gaon Monthly album chart	3
Gaon Monthly domestic album chart	3
Gaon Yearly album chart	31
Oricon Chart	5

=== Single chart ===
Song	Peak chart position		Sales
Song	KOR	KOR	Sales
Gaon Chart	K-Pop Billboard		
"Caffeine"	2	3	KOR: 1,636,851+

=== Other songs charted ===
Song	Peak position	Sales
"Just Do As You Always Did "	43	KOR: 79,733+
"You Don't Know"	47	KOR: 70,922+
"Although I"	50	KOR: 67,942+
"Look At Me Now"	54	KOR: 62,074+

=== Sales and certifications ===
Chart	Amount
Gaon physical sales	55,817
Oricon physical sales	9,781
