= Son Dong-woon =

South Korean singer (born 1991)

- 손동운
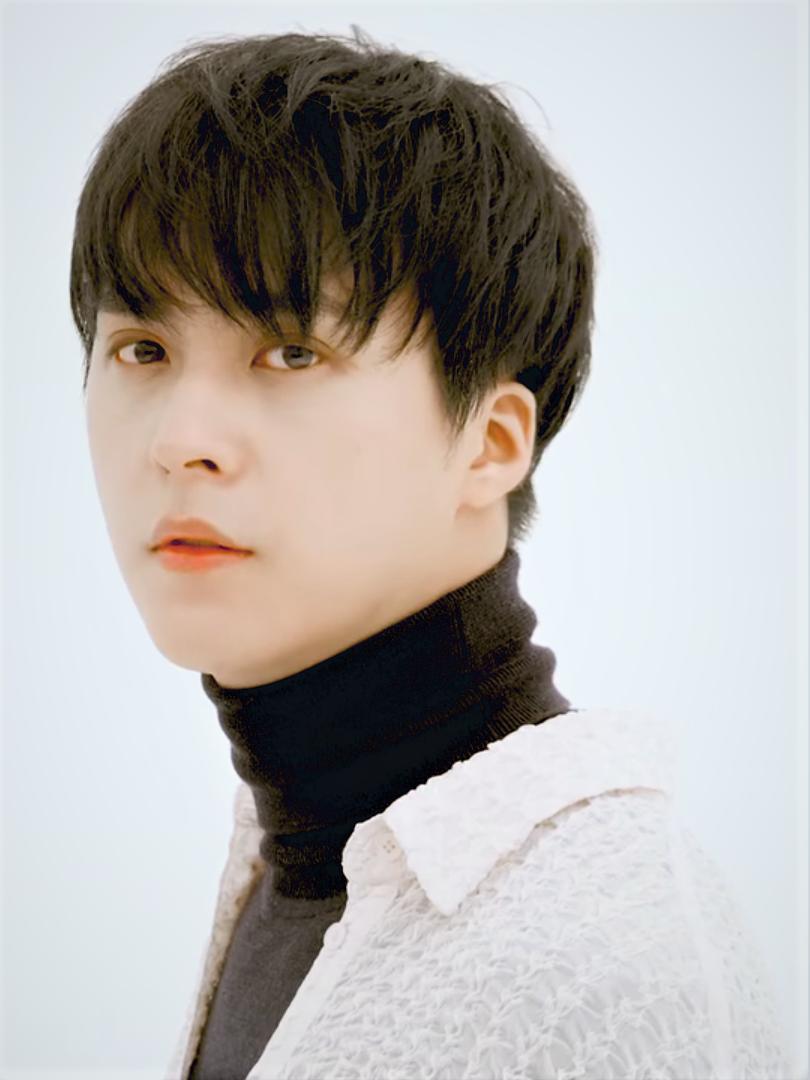
- Dongwoon in 2017
- Born: Son Dong-woon; June 6, 1991 (age 35); Seoul, South Korea
- Occupations: Singer; songwriter; actor
- Spouse: Unknown (m. 2023)
- Musical career
- Genres: K-pop; dance; R&B
- Instrument: Vocals
- Years active: 2008–present
- Labels: Around Us; Cube
- Member of: Highlight

Korean name
- Hangul: 손동운
- Hanja: 孫東雲
- RR: Son Dongun
- MR: Son Tongun

Son Dong-woon (Korean: 손동운; born June 6, 1991), known mononymously as Dongwoon, is a South Korean singer. He is a member of the boy group Highlight (formerly known as Beast).

== Biography ==
Son Dong-woon was born in Seoul, South Korea, on June 6, 1991. His father, Son Il-rak, is a professor at Cheongju University. Dong Woon stated in an interview and in the KBS show Win Win that he studied in Santa Rosa, Laguna, Philippines. Dong Woon was a trainee from JYP Entertainment for two years, and was the last member chosen to join Beast. He is the youngest of the group.

Dong Woon attended Hanyoung High School and graduated from Dongguk University on 16 February 2017.

On May 9, 2019, Son began his mandatory military service as a conscripted policeman. He was discharged on December 8, 2020.

== Career ==
=== Beast/Highlight ===
The group has released eight Korean mini-albums and various singles. Dong Woon is a vocalist of Highlight.

=== Solo career ===
In December 2010, Son released a digital single album Udon together with Davichi's Kang Min Kyung. However, it is said by the composers of 'Udon' that the title of the song is in Japanese, hence the main three broadcasting networks confirmed that they would not be showing on television.

In April 2012, Son released "In the Cloud" for Shinsadong Tiger's 'Supermarket_another Half'.

On May 22, 2015, Cube Entertainment revealed that Son will release his first solo album Kimishika on July 1 before officially beginning his Japanese debut promotions.

On February 2, 2017, Son released Universe, a digital single album in collaboration with composer Yoo Jae-hwan.

On July 18, 2018, Son released his first digital single album, Prelude: Voice.

On April 22, 2019, Son released his first mini album, Act 1: The Orchestra.

On June 6, 2022, Son released his second mini album, Happy Birthday.

In 2022, Son appeared in the SBS drama Today's Webtoon, marking his terrestrial television debut.

== Personal life ==
On June 27, 2023, Son announced he would marry his non-celebrity girlfriend in September.

== Discography ==
=== Extended plays ===
Title	Album details	Peak chart positions		Sales
Title	Album details	KOR	JPN	Sales
Korean
Act 1: The Orchestra	Released: April 22, 2019; Label: Around Us Entertainment; Formats: CD, digital download; Track listing: 1. "In the Silence" (편해지자); 2. "Natasha"; 3. "Snowy Night" (雪夜 (눈 오는 밤)); 4. "Intermission"; 5. "Thirty" (서툰 어른); 6. "Decrescendo"; 7. "A Dark Change" (암전); 8. "Curtain Call"	7	—	KOR: 6,504+
Happy Birthday	Released: June 6, 2022; Label: Around Us Entertainment; Formats: CD, digital download; Track listing: 1. "Today's Weather" (우리 날씨 맑음); 2. "Rainy Season" (장마); 3. "Letter" (편지); 4. "Moderato"; 5. "Happy Birthday to Me"	19	—	KOR: 19,090
Japanese
Kimishika	Released: July 1, 2015; Label: Universal Music; Formats: CD, DVD, digital download; Track listing: 1. "Preludio"; 2. "Kimi Shika" (キミしか / Only You); 3. "Kimi wa Shiranai" (君は知らない / You Don't Know); 4. "Amasugiru You" (アマスギルYou / Too Sweet You); 5. "Tsuyoku Omou" (ツヨク想う / Thinking Strongly); 6. "Hoshi ni Natte" (星になって / Become A Star) (with Yoon Doo-joon & Yang Yo-seob)	—	5	JPN: 15,207+
"—" denotes album did not chart or was not released in that region.

=== Soundtrack appearances and solo performances ===
Year	Title	Artist	Album
2010	"우동" ("Udong/Udon")	Kang Minkyung and Son Dongwoon	우동
2011	"꿈을 꾼다" ("Dreaming")	Yong Junhyung, Yang Yoseob, and Son Dongwoon	나도, 꽃! (I'm A Flower Too!)
2012	"In the Cloud"	Son Dongwoon	SUPER MARKET – another Half (Shinsadong Tiger Project Album)
2013	"Bye Bye Love"	Yang Yoseob, Son Dongwoon and BTOB	When a Man Falls in Love OST
2015	"Without You"	Yoon Doojoon, Yang Yoseob and Son Dongwoon	Scholar Who Walks the Night OST
2017	"Dreaming Now"	Son Dongwoon	Innocent Defendant OST
2017	"Universe"	Yoo Jaehwan, Yang Yoseob and Son Dongwoon	Universe
2017	"The Alchemist"	Yoo Jaehwan and Son Dongwoon	Universe
2017	"첫 이별" ("First Disturbance")	Yoo Jaehwan and Son Dongwoon	Universe
2018	"There's No Eternity	Son Dongwoon	Prelude : Voice
2018	"Still, Today"	Son Dongwoon	Prelude : Voice
2018	"Crescendo"	Son Dongwoon	Prelude : Voice
2018	"Color Me"	Son Dongwoon, Seoryeong	Non-album single

=== Songwriting credits ===
Year	Album	Artist	Song	Lyrics		Music	
Year	Album	Artist	Song	Credited	With	Credited	With
2009	Beast Is the B2ST	BEAST	"Beast Is the B2ST"	Yes	BEAST	No	Shin Sa Dong Tiger, Choi Gyu Seong
2009	Beast Is the B2ST	BEAST	"Bad Girl"	Yes	BEAST, Lee Sang Ho, Shin Sa Dong Tiger	No	Lee Sang Ho, Shin Sa Dong Tiger
2010	My Story	BEAST (Dongwoon & Doojoon)	"When the door closed"	Yes	Yoon Doo-joon	No	Rado
2015	Kimishika	Son Dongwoon	"Preludio"	Yes	—N/a	No	Good Life
2015	Kimishika	Son Dongwoon	"Kimi Shika"	Yes	—N/a	No	Good Life
2015	Kimishika	Son Dongwoon	"Amasugiru You"	Yes	—N/a	No	Good Life, Davii
2015	Kimishika	Son Dongwoon, Yang Yoseob and Yoon Doojoon	"Hoshi ni Natte"	Yes	—N/a	No	Rado
2016	Highlight	BEAST (Dongwoon Solo)	"I'll Give You My All"	Yes	—N/a	Yes	Good Life, Davii
2016	Non album-singles	Son Dongwoon	"Let's Have a Drink"	Yes	Jinri	Yes	Jinri, Shin Yosung
2016	Non album-singles	Kwon Nayoon	"Nothing Is Late"	Yes	Kim Donghyuk	Yes	Yoo Jaehwa
2017	Universe	Son Dongwoon, Yoo Jaehwa and Yang Yoseob	"Universe"	Yes	Hyesung	No	Yoo Jaehwa, Shin Sungjin
2017	Universe	Son Dongwoon & Yoo Jaehwa	"The Alchemist"	Yes	Curious	Yes	Curious
2017	Universe	Son Dongwoon & Yoo Jaehwa	"First Disturbance"	Yes	—	Yes	Yoo Jaehwa
2018	Prelude: Voice	Son Dongwoon	"There's No Eternity"	Yes	—	Yes	—
2018	Prelude: Voice	Son Dongwoon	"Still, Today"	Yes	—	Yes	Curious
2018	Prelude: Voice	Son Dongwoon	"Crescendo"	Yes	—	Yes	—
2018	Outro	HIGHLIGHT	"Wind" (Yoseob & Dongwoon)	Yes	Yang Yo-seob, Gyuberlake	Yes	Yang Yo-seob, Gyuberlake
2021	The Blowing	HIGHLIGHT	"Surf"	Yes	—	Yes	Shin Sungjin
2022	Daydream	HIGHLIGHT	"Our Eyes"	Yes	—	Yes	Lee Yonggyu, Shin Sungjin

== Filmography ==
=== Television series ===
Year	Title	Role	Notes	Ref.
2022	Today's Webtoon	Oh Yoon	Debut in terrestrial drama	

=== Web series ===
Year	Title	Role	Note	Ref.
2021	The Guys I Want to Catch	Dongwoon	Dingo Music	

=== Television shows ===
Year	Title	Role	Notes	Ref.
2016	Celebrity Bromance	Cast	Episode 14	
2017	Battle Trip	Contestant	with Doojoon; Episode 52–53	
2017	Battle Trip	Special MC	Episode 73	
2018	Amor Feti	Cast Member		
2022	Is the parting will be a recall?	Judge		
2022	The Listen: The Voice We Loved	Cast Member		

=== Web shows ===
Year	Title	Role	Notes	Ref.
2018	I Will Give You a Universe	Cast Member		
2022	Delivery 2	Host	with Yang Yo-seob	

=== Hosting ===
Year	Title	Notes	Ref.
2018	School Attack	with Eun Ji-won and JooE	
2018	GOT YA! GWSN	with Kim Shin-young, Sojin and DinDin	

== Theatre ==
Year	Title	Role	Notes	Ref.
2012–2013	Catch Me If You Can	Frank Abagnale Jr.	Lead Role	
2016	The Great Gatsby [RE:BOOT]	Gatsby	Lead Role	
2017–2018	Hourglass	Baek Jae-hee	Lead Role	
2018–2019	Altar Boyz	Abraham	Lead Role	
