= Highlight (band) =

South Korean boy band

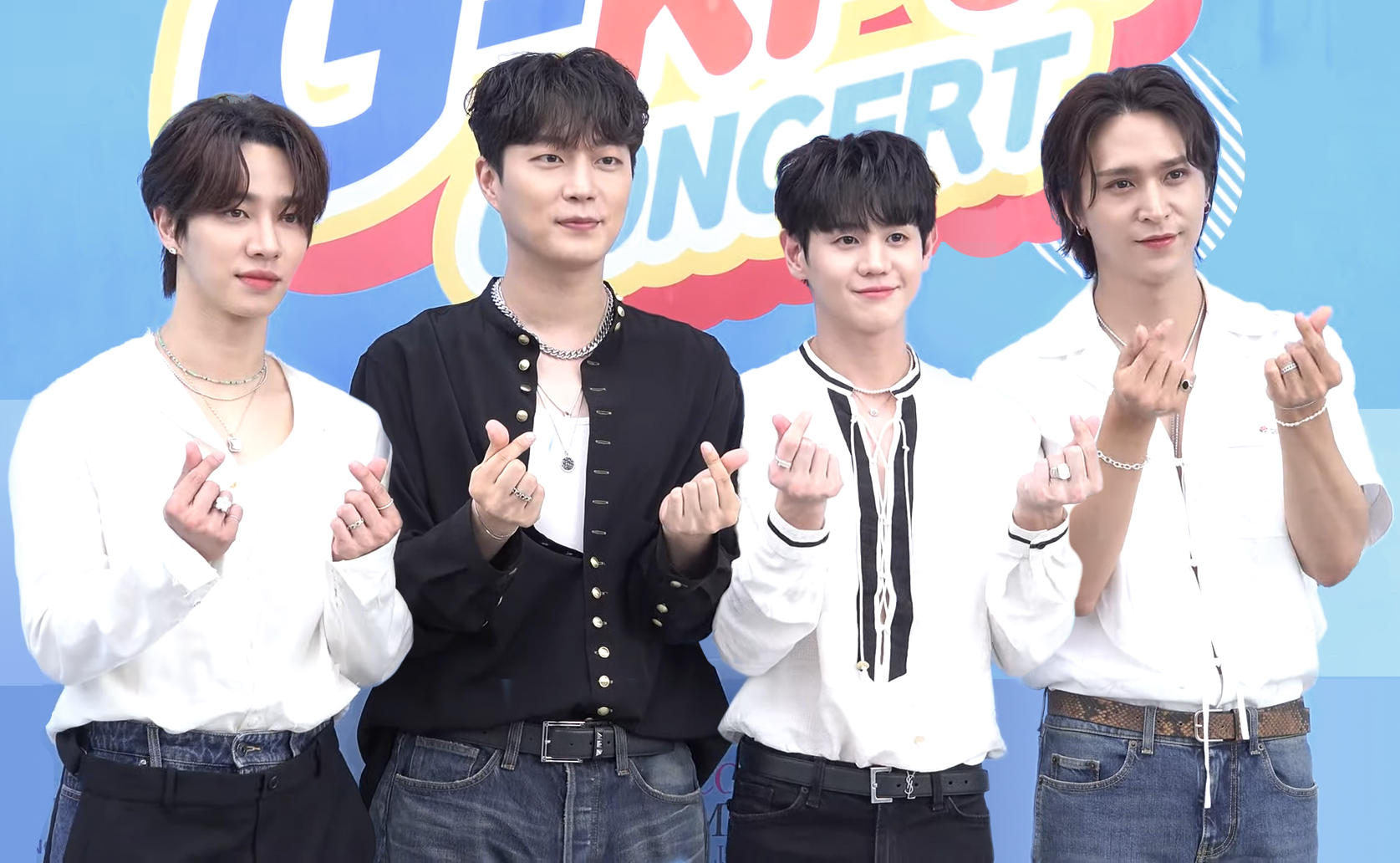
- Highlight in 2022; Left to right: Lee Gi-kwang, Yoon Doo-joon, Yang Yo-seob, Son Dong-woon

Background information
- Also known as: Beast (2009–2016) (Note: Name was used to promote the single "Endless Ending" after the group regained the rights to their name.)
- Origin: South Korea
- Genre: K-pop
- Years active: 2009–present
- Labels: Around Us; Cube; Universal
- Members: Yoon Doo-joon; Yang Yo-seob; Lee Gi-kwang; Son Dong-woon
- Past members: Yong Jun-hyung; Jang Hyun-seung
- Website: playb2st.co.kr

Highlight (Korean: 하이라이트; RR: Hailaiteu), formerly known as Beast (비스트; Biseuteu), is a South Korean boy band formed by Cube Entertainment. The band consists of four members: Yoon Doo-joon, Yang Yo-seob, Lee Gi-kwang, and Son Dong-woon. Highlight was originally a six-piece band; Jang Hyun-seung departed from the group in April 2016, and Yong Jun-hyung departed in March 2019. In late 2016, the group moved labels from Cube Entertainment to Around Us Entertainment and subsequently changed their name to Highlight in 2017.

The group debuted in 2009 with the extended play (EP) Beast Is the B2ST. In 2011, they released their first studio album, Fiction and Fact, and made their Japanese debut with the single, "Shock". As Beast, the group released three Korean studio albums, nine Korean extended plays, two Japanese studio albums, and numerous singles. The group re-debuted as Highlight in 2017 with the extended play (EP) Can You Feel It?.

Beast initially received attention for the lack of industry success previously experienced by its members, with media outlets referring to them as a "recycled group". However, the group has achieved significant commercial success and critical accolades and is one of the most awarded groups of all time at the Golden Disc Awards, the Seoul Music Awards, and the Melon Music Awards.

== History ==
=== 2009: Pre-debut documentary and Beast Is the B2ST ===
In August 2009, Cube Entertainment publicly introduced its new boy group B2ST (an abbreviation for "Boys To Search for Top") on the TV documentary series MTV B2ST. The group consisted of Yoon Doo-joon, who previously competed on another series to be member of 2PM or 2AM; Jang Hyun-seung, who had competed on a series to be a member of BigBang; Lee Gi-kwang, who previously debuted as a solo artist under the name AJ; Yang Yo-seob; Yong Jun-hyung; and Son Dong-woon.

After changing their name from B2ST to Beast, the group debuted on October 15, 2009, with the extended play Beast Is the B2ST. They began promotions that day for the album and its lead single, "Bad Girl", by holding a live showcase and performing on KBS Music Bank. The EP sold over 10,000 copes in its first week of release and went on to sell 40,000 copies by early 2010, an unusual feat for a Korean rookie group at the time.

In December, Beast won the Rookie of the Month award from South Korea's Ministry of Culture, Sports and Tourism. The group's second single, "Mystery", garnered them an award for Rookie of the Month at the Cyworld Digital Music Awards that December. Beast also won Best New Artist at the 19th Seoul Music Awards in February 2010.

=== 2010: Shock of the New Era, Mastermind, Lights Go On Again and My Story ===
Beast released their second EP, Shock of the New Era, on March 1, 2010. Later that month, the group achieved their first music show number-one win on Mnet's M Countdown with the album's lead single "Shock". Beast released a music video for the album's second single, "Take Care of My Girlfriend (Say No)", in April. Shock of the New Era quickly sold 20,000 copies in South Korea, ultimately selling nearly 60,000 copies by the end of the year. In August, Beast received the Golden Disk Award from their international label, Universal Music, in recognition of the group's album sales in Singapore, Malaysia, and Taiwan.

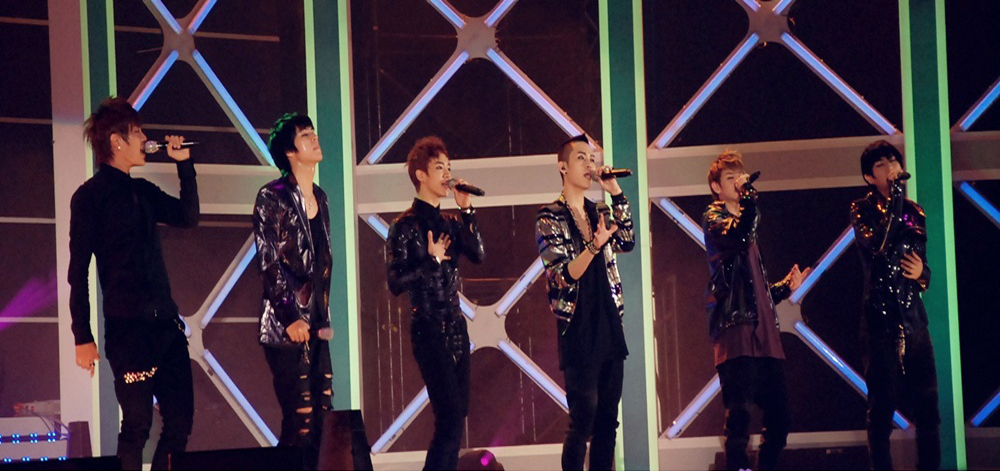
Beast performing in 2010.

On September 28, Beast released their third EP, Mastermind. One week later, the group claimed first place on KBS Music Bank with the album's lead single, "Breath". In October, Beast received the Asia Influential Artist Award at the 2010 Asia Song Festival. The group followed up this success with their fourth EP, Lights Go On Again, released on November 9. The album, which includes the single "Beautiful", was the group's first to reach the number-one spot on the Gaon Album Chart. Cumulative sales of Shock of the New Era, Mastermind and Lights Go On Again exceeded 107,000 copies by mid-December, making Beast the only South Korean rookie group to sell over 100,000 albums in 2010.

On December 9, Beast was awarded Best New Artist at the 25th Golden Disc Awards. Three days later, they held their first solo concert, "Welcome to Beast Airline", at the Jamsil Indoor Stadium in Seoul to an audience of 10,000. At the concert, the group debuted three duets that they subsequently released online starting on December 21 as part of the digital EP, My Story.

=== 2011: Japanese debut and Fiction and Fact ===
Beast released their first Japanese single, a Japanese version of "Shock", on March 16, 2011. The song sold 29,000 copies in one week and debuted at number two on the daily Oricon Singles Chart, the highest-ranking debut by a foreign artist at the time.

On May 17, Beast released their first full-length Korean album, Fiction and Fact. The album peaked at number one on the Gaon Album Chart and sold over 142,000 copies by the end of the year. Its singles, "On Rainy Days" and "Fiction" were also commercially successful, selling 2.8 million and 2.6 million copies, respectively, by the end of the year. The album garnered Beast wins for Artist of the Year for the 2nd Quarter at the 2011 Gaon Chart Music Awards and a Bonsang at the 2012 Golden Disc Awards. "Fiction" won Song of the Year at the 2011 KBS Music Festival, and Best Male Dance Performance at the 2011 Mnet Asian Music Awards.

On August 10, the group released their first Japanese album, So Beast, which includes Japanese versions of "Shock" and "Bad Girl" as singles. The album debuted in the number-two spot on the daily Oricon Albums Chart, selling over 26,000 copies in its first day of release.

In November, Beast was awarded the grand prize of Artist of the Year at the 3rd Melon Music Awards, as well as a commendation from South Korea's Minister of Culture at the 2011 Korean Popular Culture and Arts Awards for the group's contributions to pop culture and the spread of the Korean wave abroad. In early 2012, the group was awarded Best New Artist at the 26th Japan Gold Disc Awards in recognition of the commercial success of their Japanese releases.

=== 2012–2013: Beautiful Show, Midnight Sun and Hard to Love, How to Love ===
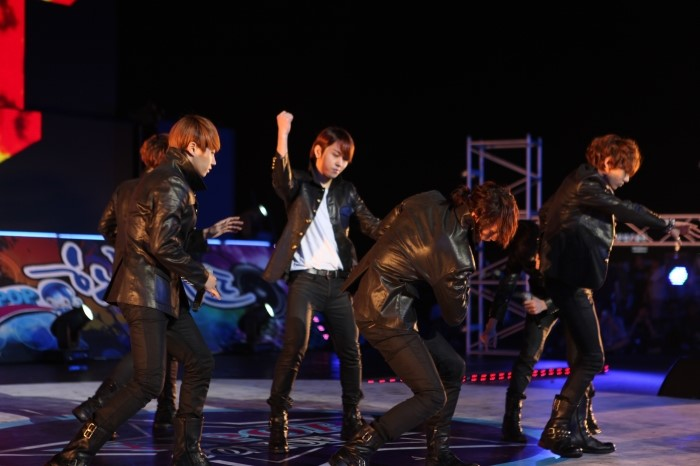
Beast performing at the Expo 2012.

Beast embarked on their "Beautiful Show" international tour in February 2012, in which the group performed in cities throughout Asia, Europe, and North America. Mid-tour, the group released a self-filmed music video for their 2009 single "Mystery", which subsequently charted at number one on YinYueTai, a major Chinese music video sharing website.

On July 21, Beast released their fifth extended play, Midnight Sun, which includes the singles "I Knew It", "Midnight" and "Beautiful Night". The album was written, in large part, by group member Yong Jun-hyung. It debuted at number one on the Gaon Album Chart and marked Beast's first appearance on the Billboard World Albums Chart, peaking at number 15. The album sold over 140,000 copies by the end of the year and garnered the group a Bonsang award at the 27th Golden Disc Awards. In November, Beast won their second consecutive award for Artist of the Year at the 4th Melon Music Awards.

On July 19, 2013, Beast released their second full-length Korean album, Hard to Love, How to Love, which was composed by Yong Jun-hyung and his writing partner Kim Tae-joo. The album includes the ballad, "Will You Be Okay?", which was released a month prior and charted at number one on both the Gaon Digital Chart and Billboard's K-Pop Hot 100. The album won the group Bonsang awards at the 28th Golden Disc Awards, 5th Melon Music Awards and 23rd Seoul Music Awards, while the album's lead single, "Shadow", won Best Music Video at the Melon Music Awards.

=== 2014–2015: Good Luck, Time and Ordinary ===
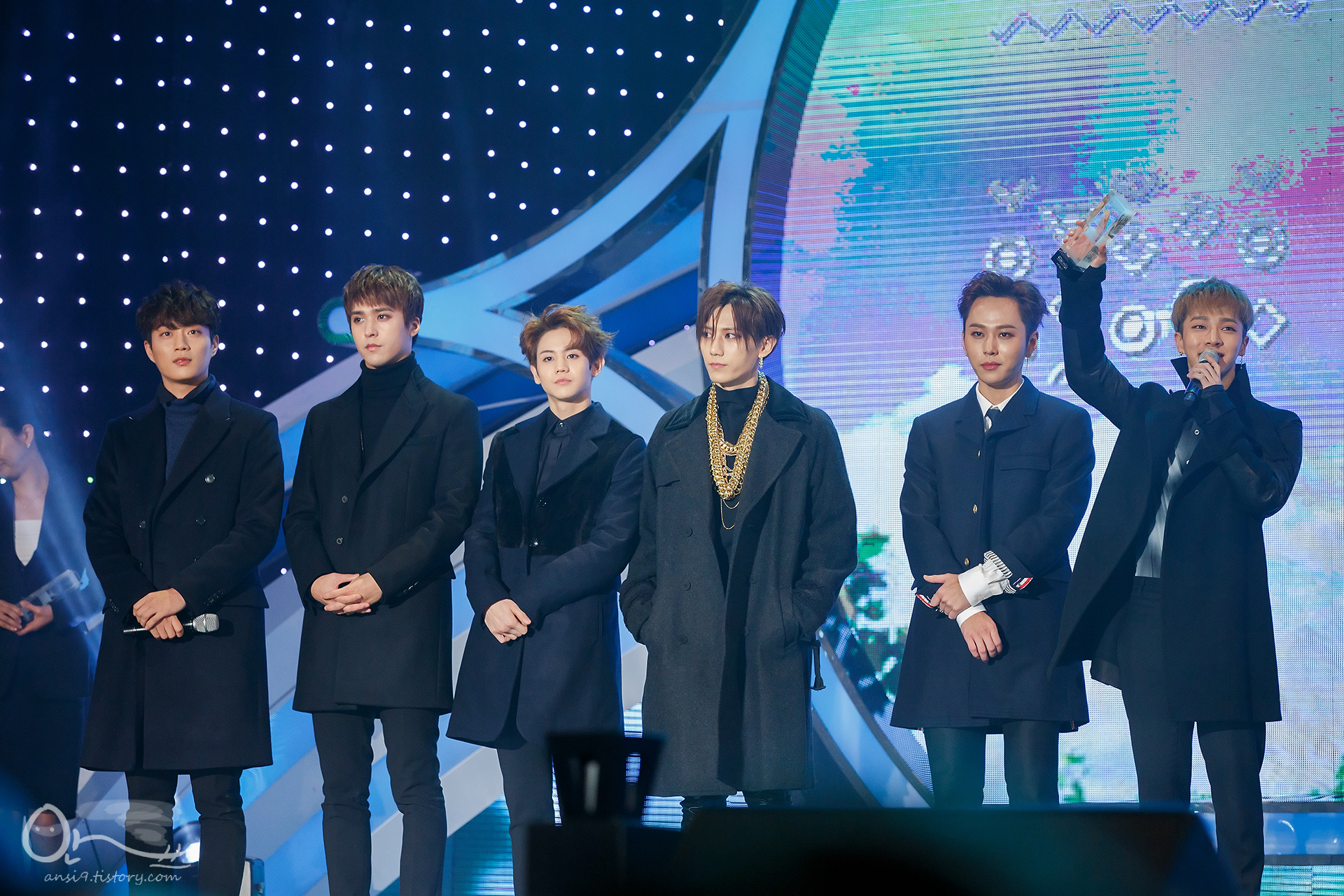
Beast in 2014.

On June 16, 2014, Beast released their sixth extended play, Good Luck. The album debuted at number one on the Gaon Album Chart, while its singles, "No More" and "Good Luck", both reached the number-one spot on the Gaon Digital Chart. "Good Luck" was also a critical success, named the best k-pop song of the year by Billboard and ranked number two for the year by Dazed.

The group released their seventh EP, Time, on October 20, 2014, to mark their fifth anniversary since debuting. The album debuted at number one on the Gaon Album Chart and later won Record of the Year at the 24th Seoul Music Awards. The album's lead single, "12:30", reached number two on the Gaon Digital Chart.

Beast released their eighth EP, Ordinary, on July 27, 2015, again topping the Gaon Album Chart. The album includes two singles, "Gotta Go to Work" and "YeY", which reached number four and number three, respectively, on the Gaon Digital Chart.

=== 2016: Guess Who?, Hyun-seung's departure, Highlight and new label ===
Beast released their second Japanese album, Guess Who?, on March 9, 2016. The album debuted on the daily Oricon Albums Chart at number two.

On April 19, Cube Entertainment released a statement announcing that Jang Hyun-seung was leaving the group to pursue a career as a solo artist. According to the statement, Hyun-seung's decision to leave the group was due to differences of opinion between him and the other members concerning their music.

As a five-member group, Beast released the single "Butterfly" on June 26, followed on July 4 by their third full-length album, Highlight, and its lead single, "Ribbon". Highlight debuted at number one on the Gaon Album Chart, while its singles both charted in the top ten of the Gaon Digital Chart.

In early November, media outlets reported that the members' 7-year exclusive contracts with Cube Entertainment had expired the previous month. According to reports, the five members had not renewed their contracts and were in negotiations with the label to gain the rights to the Beast trademark. On December 15, the group announced the launch of their new label, Around Us Entertainment, confirming their departure from Cube. As Cube still owned the rights to the name Beast, the group made media appearances and held events without a name for the remainder of the year.

=== 2017: Rebranding as Highlight, Can You Feel It?, Calling You, and Celebrate ===
On February 24, 2017, Around Us Entertainment announced that the members had chosen the name Highlight as their new group name.

On March 2, 2017, it was announced that Highlight would officially debut on March 20, 2017, with their mini-album Can You Feel It?.

On April 9, 2017, Highlight announced that they would be holding their first concert tour as Highlight and release a repackaged album Calling You on May 29.

On October 16, 2017, Highlight released their second EP, Celebrate, in the celebration of their eighth anniversary.

=== 2018–2020: Military enlistment, Outro, and Jun-hyung's departure ===
On August 24, 2018, Yoon Doo-joon enlisted for mandatory military service. He was discharged on April 10, 2020.

It was announced that Highlight's special album, Outro, will be released on November 20, 2018, being promoted with 4 members.

On January 24, 2019, Yang Yo-seob began his mandatory military service as a conscripted police officer. On August 30, 2020, he was discharged from the military.

On March 13, 2019, Yong Jun-hyung announced his departure from Highlight after he admitted to watching an illegal video sent to him by singer Jung Joon-young, who at the time was under investigation for secretly filming women during sex.

On April 18, 2019, Lee Gi-kwang began his mandatory military service as a conscripted police officer. On November 17, 2020, he was discharged from the military.

On May 9, 2019, Son Dong-woon began his mandatory military service as a conscripted policeman. On December 7, 2020, he was discharged from the military, marking the end of Highlight's military enlistment.

=== 2021–present: Further releases ===
Following a two-and-a-half year hiatus, Highlight made their first comeback as a four-member group on May 3, 2021, with their third EP, The Blowing.

On March 21, 2022, Highlight released their fourth studio album, Daydream. After the promotions for Daydream ended, it was announced that Highlight would be holding a three-day concert, INTRO, at Jamsil Indoor Gymnasium from March 20–22. This would mark their first concert as a group in over 3 years, following the COVID-19 outbreak, their military enlistment, and the OUTRO concert in November 2018, where Doo-joon was absent. Tickets were sold out within three days.

The group hosted a fan concert titled Highlight Sports Day on October 15–16. On the second day, Highlight announced their comeback by playing a short clip during the concert end credits. The clip featured Lee singing, "Because I'm alone, I'm alone without you," paired with their comeback date. Their 4th EP, After Sunset, was released on November 7, 2022.

In January 2024, Around Us announced that Highlight would be releasing their fifth EP, Switch On and its lead single "Body" on March 11, 2024.

In April 2024, it was revealed the group regained the trademark to their old name, Beast, but would continue to use the name they've been using since 2016. On April 16, 2025, the group released the single "Endless Ending," promoting it under the name "Beast."

== Discography ==
=== As Beast ===
Korean albums

- Fiction and Fact (2011)
- Hard to Love, How to Love (2013)
- Highlight (2016)

Japanese albums

- So Beast (2011)
- Guess Who? (2016)

=== As Highlight ===
Korean albums

- Daydream (2022)

== Filmography ==
=== Reality shows ===
- MTV B2ST (2009)
- MTV B2ST Almighty (2010)
- Idol Maid (2010)
- Burning the Beast (2014)
- Music-Slip Show "As We Say" (2017)
- Ready Player: HIGHLIGHT (2018)
- Super Seller (2021)

Beast was the topic of a short-lived reality show, MTV B2ST, which was hosted by MTV. The show ran on a weekly basis from August 23 – October 9, 2009, with a total of ten episodes. The program showcased their journey leading up to their debut. It was announced in March 2010 that Beast will be hosting a second season of MTV B2ST entitled MTV Beast Almighty. After last year's broadcast debut, season 2 had fans and viewers' wishes as the concept of the program where the members will have to pick out one wish to grant for every episode. The show ran on a weekly basis from April 10 – May 29, 2010.

Beast became the protagonists of the variety show Idol Maid running on a weekly basis from July 21 – October 13, 2010. The group also had a cameo on the sitcom More Charming by the Day.

Beast was selected as a PR envoy to promote the audition program Global Super Idol, which aired in November, 2011. They also attended the preliminaries in Korea, Thailand, and China to encourage the contestants and give advice. Global Super Idol is a global audition program that pits finalists from Thailand and China against finalists in Korea. All the finalists will attend the main show in Korea. Since Beast is very popular in Asian countries, including Thailand, Japan, and China, their popularity helped the show become popular too by performing their songs for fans and contestants from all over the world.

Beast was a part of 12-episode reality show, Showtime: Burning the Beast, in 2014. It was their first reality show in 4 years, which featured them getting to know each other better through missions.

== Other activities ==
On December 3, 2010, Beast attended the Patricia Field Collection fashion show located in Seoul Cheongdamdong MCM Haus and was praised by Patricia Field herself for their "distinctive and modern look". For this collection, MCM's Heritage and Patricia Field worked together to show off a modern New Yorker style with a trendy shopper bag, backpack, clutch, and more items and any money earned from it will be donated to the 'Korea Disaster Relief' to benefit the civilians left homeless from the Yeonpyeong incident.

In April 2012, Beast collaborated with Jim Rickey to make their own sneaker brand, Beast X Jim Rickey. Beast members were directly involved in the design of these shoes and they are available in 6 different colours.

== Concerts and tours ==
=== Concerts ===
- Welcome to Beast Airline – Seoul Olympic Stadium, Seoul (December 12, 2010)
- Welcome Back to Beast Airlines- Seoul Olympic Stadium, Seoul (February 18–19, 2011)
- Beautiful Show 2013 – Olympic Gymnastics Arena, Seoul (July 20–21, 2013)
- Beautiful Show 2014 – Olympic Gymnastics Arena, Seoul (August 16–17, 2014)
- Beautiful Show in Hong Kong – AsiaWorld–Expo, Hong Kong (May 30, 2015)
- Beautiful Show in Taiwan – Tianmu Stadium, Taipei (June 6, 2015)
- Beautiful Show 2015 – Olympic Gymnastics Arena, Seoul (August 29–30, 2015)
- Beautiful Show 2016 – Olympic Gymnastics Arena, Seoul (August 20–21, 2016)
- Celebrate Live 2017 – Jamsil Arena, Seoul (December 21–23, 2017)
- Celebrate Live 2018 – Taipei Nangang Exhibition Center, Taipei (March 11, 2018)
- OUTRO Live 2018 – Olympic Gymnastics Arena, Seoul (November 24–25, 2018)
- INTRO Live 2022 – Jamsil Arena, Seoul (May 20–22, 2022)
- INTRO Live in Japan 2022 – Tokyo Dome City Hall, Tokyo (September 18–19, 2022)

=== Tours ===
- Beautiful Show – Seoul, Berlin, Shanghai, Singapore, Jakarta, Yokohama, Kobe, Nagoya, Taipei and Bangkok (February 4 to May 27, 2012)
- We Zepp Tour 2012 – Sapporo, Osaka, Hiroshima, Nagoya, Fukuoka and Tokyo (October 12–30, 2012)
- Japan Tour 2014 – Ichihara, Nagoya, Fukuoka, Tokyo, Osaka, and Hiroshima (January 31 to April 3, 2014)
- Japan Tour 2015 – Ichihara, Sapporo, Niigata, Nagoya, Tokyo, Fukuoka, Hiroshima and Kobe (October 30 to November 29, 2015)
- Beautiful Show in China 2015–2016 – Shanghai, Guangzhou, Beijing and Chengdu (December 6, 2015, to 2016)
- Guess Who? Tour 2016 – Ichihara, Niigata, Nagoya, Fukuoka, Nagasaki, Saitama, Tokyo, Sapporo, Osaka and Hiroshima (June 3 to July 2, 2016)
- Can You Feel It? Live 2017 – Seoul, Busan, Gwangju, Hong Kong and Taipei (June 2 to September 16, 2017)
- Can You Feel It? Live in Japan 2017 – Osaka, Nagoya and Tokyo (August 20–24, 2017)
- Lights Go On, Again – Seoul, Hong Kong, Bangkok, Kaoshiung, Tokyo and Singapore (May 10 to September 8, 2024)
- Ride or Die – Seoul, Taipei, Macau, Manila, Tokyo, Bangkok, Kuala Lumpur (August 2 – September 27, 2025)
