= Lee Gi-kwang =

South Korean musician and actor (born 1990)

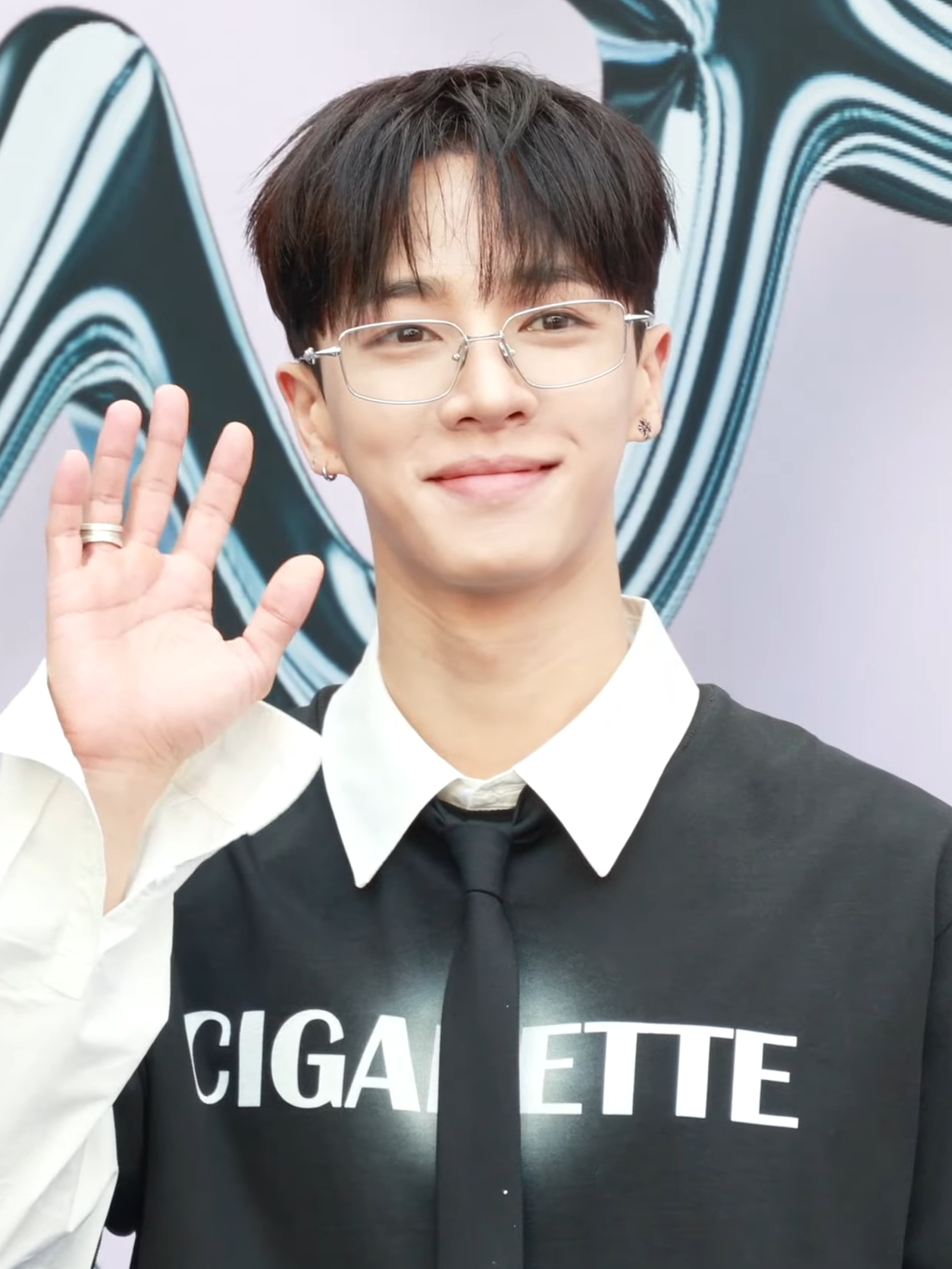
- Lee in September 2024
- Born: March 30, 1990 (age 36); Gwangju, South Korea
- Occupations: Singer; songwriter; actor
- Musical career
- Genres: K-pop; dance
- Instrument: Vocals
- Years active: 2008–present
- Labels: Around Us; Cube
- Member of: Highlight

Korean name
- Hangul: 이기광
- RR: I Gigwang
- MR: I Kigwang

Lee Gi-kwang (Korean: 이기광; born March 30, 1990), known professionally as Gikwang or Kikwang, is a South Korean singer, songwriter and actor. He originally debuted as solo singer with the stage name AJ (Ace Junior), releasing his first mini album First Episode: A New Hero on April 4, 2009. In October 2009, he debuted as the main dancer, visual and a lead vocalist of boy group Beast, which was renamed Highlight in February 2017.

He began his acting career with a supporting role in the popular television sitcom High Kick Through the Roof (2009–10) and had supporting roles in dramas My Princess (2011), Me Too, Flower! (2011), Mrs. Cop (2015), Monster (2016), Circle (2017), and Lovely Horribly (2018). He also became an MC for various shows such as Hot Brothers and Inkigayo.

== Early life and career ==
Lee Gi-kwang was born on March 30, 1990 in Gwangju, South Korea. Gi-kwang found interest in hip hop and had particular liking to many classic hip hop acts. At first he was backed by his family to pursue a musical career but eventually he passed an audition and became a trainee. He was trained under JYP Entertainment for four years before being eliminated. He was asked by the former president of Cube Entertainment to join the agency without auditioning, making him the company's first trainee.

He was known as the solo singer AJ or Ace Junior when he debuted and released a mini-album First Episode: A New Hero on April 4, 2009. He made his debut on April 2, 2009 on Mnet M!Countdown, and dubbed by Korean media as the next Rain. However he met controversies when his name created dispute among netizens for having a similar name with Paran's AJ (who later became a U-KISS member). He now goes with his original name when he re-debuted with Beast. On June 17, 2009, AJ opened for Lady Gaga's Korean showcase. Fellow Beast members Yoon Doo-joon, Yong Jun-hyung, Jang Hyun-seung and Yang Yo-seob participated as backup dancers for AJ before debuting in Beast. AJ also featured in reality show, Diary of AJ, which was hosted by MTV. The show ran on two episodes on May 9, 2009 with a total of two episodes showcasing his journey on his debut as AJ.

== Career ==
=== 2009–2016: Debut with Beast and solo activities ===
Six months after debuting as soloist, Gi-kwang was chosen to debut as member of Beast, originally known as B2ST, an acronym for "Boys 2 Search the Top". However, their name was changed to BEAST (acronym for "Boys of East Asia Standing Tall"). The group debuted in October 2009. Gi-kwang made his acting debut in the MBC sitcom High Kick Through the Roof, which aired in 2009 and 2010.

In 2010, Gi-kwang featured in K.Will's music video for the song, "Present". He was also selected as the MC for MBC's Sunday Sunday Night segment Hot Brothers and the KBS talk show Win Win. In May, Gi-kwang was chosen as the model for the 'Ice Tea Tio' from DongSuh Foods. In August, Gi-kwang featured on Ahn Jinkyung's single "Love is Pathetic" from the mini album Be the Voice as a rapper. He, Yoon Doojoon and IU appeared as special hosts on Music Core on August 21, 2010. On December 29, Gi-kwang was awarded with Popularity Award from the 2010 MBC Entertainment Awards.

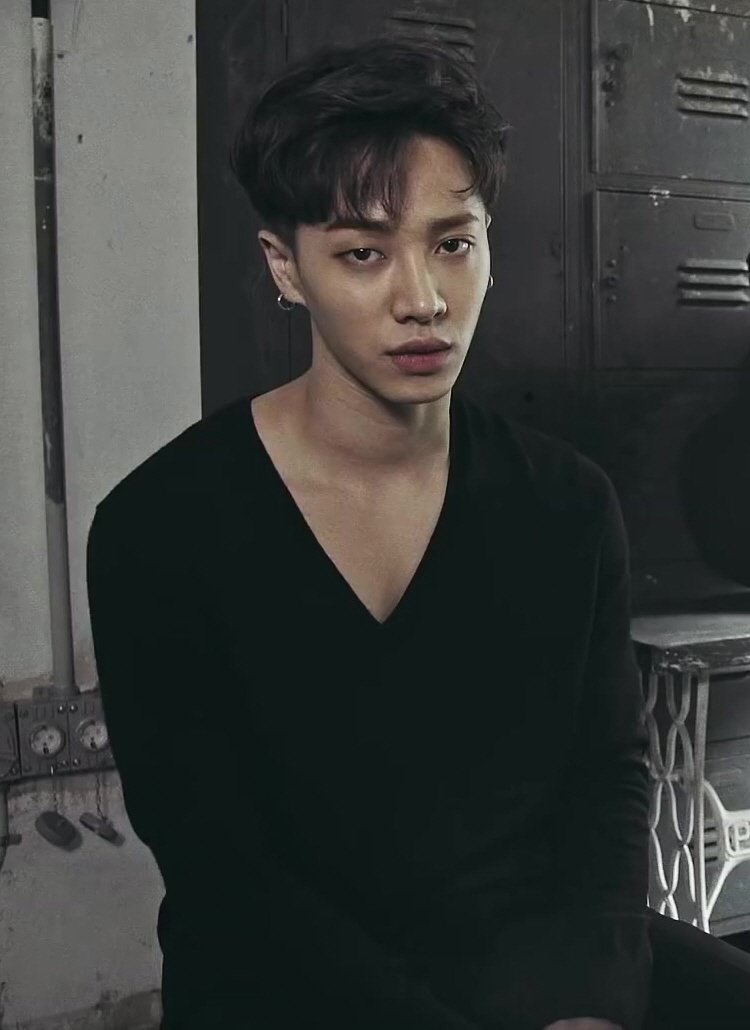
Lee in 2016

Gi-kwang, together with IU, were selected to be new MCs of Inkigayo in replacement of CNBlue's Jung Yonghwa from March 20, 2011. The two were paired with the existing MCs, 2AM's Jo Kwon, and f(x)'s Sulli. He was also chosen as the leading man in A Pink's music video, "I Don't Know" Sunny Hill's music video for "Midnight Circus". In July, Gi-kwang was featured on Brave Brothers' song "Break Up" alongside Electroboyz, as a part of Brave Brother's sixth project album on July 12, 2011.

Also in 2011, Gi-kwang was cast in the romantic comedy drama My Princess starring Song Seung-hun and Kim Tae-hee; and played Lee Ji-ah's patrol partner in the drama Me Too, Flower!. Gi-kwang won the Best New Actor award at the SBS Drama Awards for his performance in My Princess.

On February 8, 2012 Gi-kwang appeared in Ailee's debut music video, "Heaven". Gi-kwang also hosted SBS K-Pop Super Concert in America on November 10 alongside Tiffany Hwang and Jung Yong-hwa and Melon Music Awards with Infinite's Woohyun, Moon Hee-jun, and Danny Ahn.

In 2013, Gi-kwang had a role as a terminally ill patient with leukemia on KBS Drama Special My Friend is Still Alive. In 2014, he starred in the mobile drama 20's (Twenty Years Old).

In 2015, Gi-kwang was cast in SBS's drama Mrs. Cop as the youngest detective on the team. He next starred as the younger version of Kang Ji-hwan's character in the 2016 MBC drama Monster, and the web drama Momin's Room.

=== 2017–present: Return to solo music career ===
In September 2017, Gi-kwang returned as a soloist with his first mini album One. The lead single was a future R&B single titled "What You Like". Gi-kwang reportedly participated in 6 out of 8 tracks on the album. He held his first solo concert Lee Gikwang Mini Live 2018 One in January 2018.

Also in 2017, Gi-kwang was cast in tvN's science fiction drama Circle. In 2018, Gi-kwang was cast in KBS' horror romance drama Lovely Horribly.

On April 18, 2019, Gi-kwang began his mandatory military service as a conscripted police officer. He was discharged on November 18, 2020.

In 2022, Lee became a DJ on Gikwang's Song Plaza, which began in March and he ended his duties as a DJ on April 16, 2023.

== Discography ==
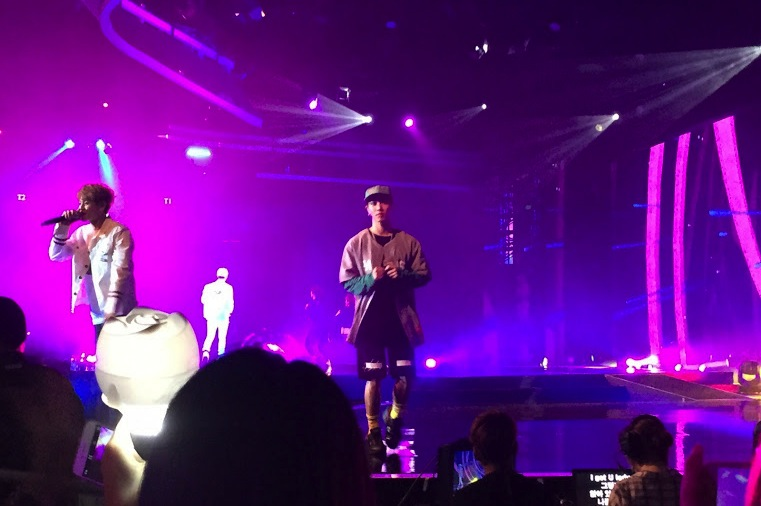
Gikwang performing in Singapore at BEAST Ordinary Fanmeet 2015

=== Studio albums ===
Title	Album details	Peak chart positions		Sales
Title	Album details	KOR	JPN Down.	Sales
Predator	Released: April 17, 2023; Label: Around Us Entertainment, RCA Records; Formats: CD, digital download	11	94	KOR: 42,242

=== Single albums ===
Title	Album details
[I]	Released: March 18, 2019; Label: Around Us Entertainment, RCA Records; Formats: Digital download

=== Extended plays ===
Title	EP details	Peak chart positions		Sales
Title	EP details	KOR	JPN	Sales
First Episode: A New Hero	Released: April 4, 2009; Label: Cube Entertainment; Formats: CD, digital download	—	—	KOR: 2,068
ONE	Released: September 4, 2017; Label: Around Us Entertainment, RCA Records; Formats: CD, digital download	5	171	KOR: 25,570; JPN: 670
"—" denotes releases that did not chart or were not released in that region.

=== Singles ===
==== As lead artist ====
Title	Year	Peak chart positions	Sales (DL)	Album
Title	Year	KOR	Sales (DL)	Album
"Dancing Shoes"	2009	—		First Episode: A New Hero
"Wipe the Tears" (눈물을 닦고)	2009	—		First Episode: A New Hero
"What You Like"	2017	51	KOR: 31,832	ONE
"Don't Close Your Eyes (D.C.Y.E)" (feat. Kid Milli)	2019	— (Note: "Don't Close Your Eyes (D.C.Y.E)" did not enter the Gaon Digital Chart, but it peaked at number 57 on the component Download Chart.)		[I]
"Nothing"	2019	—		Goodbye with a Smile (single)
"Predator"	2023	— (Note: "Predator" did not enter the Circle Digital Chart, but it peaked at number 12 on the component Download Chart.)		Predator
"—" denotes releases that did not chart or were not released in that region.

==== As featured artist ====
Title	Year	Peak chart positions	Album
Title	Year	KOR	Album
"Love Is Pathetic" (사랑이 딱해) (An Jin-kyung feat. Gikwang)	2010	31	Be the Voice

==== Collaborations ====
Title	Year	Peak chart positions	Sales (DL)	Album
Title	Year	KOR	Sales (DL)	Album
"Let It Snow" (with Hyunseung)	2010	87		My Story
"Should I Hug or Not" (with Doojoon, Junhyung)	2011	16	KOR: 404,008	Shinsa Dong Tiger Project: Supermarket – The Half
"Break Up" (with Brave Brothers, Electro Boys)	2011	34	KOR: 456,105	Non-album single
"Yesterday" (with Dynamic BLACK)	2012	9	KOR: 269,507	Non-album single
"Baby It's You" (with Doojoon)	2016	66	KOR: 35,265	Highlight
"Just Trust Me" (오빠만 믿어) (with Park Hyun-bin, Lizzy, Park Kwanghyun)	2017	—		Fantastic Duo 2
"Dazzling Dazzling" (샤방샤방) (with Park Hyun-bin)	2017	—		Fantastic Duo 2
"—" denotes releases that did not chart or were not released in that region.

=== Music videos ===
Year	Title
2009	"Dancing Shoes"
2009	"Wipe the Tears"
2017	"What You Like"
2019	"D.C.Y.E/Don't Close Your Eyes"
2019	"Lonely (Feat. Jiselle)"
2019	"Nothing"

=== Songwriting credits ===
Year	Album	Artist	Song	Lyrics		Music	
Year	Album	Artist	Song	Credited	With	Credited	With
2009	Beast Is the B2ST	BEAST	"Beast Is the B2ST"	Yes	BEAST	No	Shin Sa Dong Tiger, Choi Gyu Seong
2009	Beast Is the B2ST	BEAST	"Bad Girl"	Yes	BEAST, Lee Sang Ho, Shin Sa Dong Tiger	No	Lee Sang Ho, Shin Sa Dong Tiger
2010	My Story	BEAST (Gikwang & Hyunseung)	"Let It Snow"	Yes	Jang Hyun-seung	No	Choi Gyu Seong
2013	Thriller	BtoB	"Why"	Yes	Lim Hyunsik	Yes	Lim Hyunsik, Lee Minhyuk, Shin Peniel, Jung IlHoon
2014	Good Luck	BEAST	"History"	Yes	Yong Jun-hyung, Noday	Yes	Noday
2014	Time	BEAST	"So Hot"	Yes	Noday	Yes	Yong Jun-hyung, Noday
2015	Ordinary	BEAST	"Oh Honey"	Yes	Yong Jun-hyung, Noday, Chloe	Yes	Noday, Chloe
2016	Highlight	BEAST	"Curious"	Yes	Yong Jun-hyung, Noday	Yes	Noday
2016	Highlight	BEAST	"Lullaby"	Yes	Yong Jun-hyung, Noday, Chloe	Yes	Noday, Chloe
2016	Highlight	BEAST (Gikwang & Doojoon)	"Baby It's You"	Yes	Noday	Yes	Noday
2017	Can You Feel It?	HIGHLIGHT	"Dangerous"	Yes	Yong Jun-hyung, Kwon Phillip	Yes	Kwon Phillip
2017	ONE	Gikwang	"ONE"	Yes	Kim Tae-joo	Yes	Kim Tae-joo
2017	ONE	Gikwang	"Misunderstand"	Yes	Noday, Kwon Philip	Yes	Noday, Kwon Philip
2017	ONE	Gikwang	"Dream"	Yes	Kim Tae-sung, Joo Chanyang, Luizy	Yes	Kim Tae-sung, Joo Chanyang, Secret Weapon
2017	ONE	Gikwang	"Look At Me Now"	Yes	Noday	Yes	Noday
2017	ONE	Gikwang	"Only U"	Yes	Noday, Chloe	Yes	Noday, Chloe
2017	ONE	Gikwang	"What Are U"	Yes	Noday, Chloe	Yes	Noday, Chloe
2017	Celebrate	HIGHLIGHT	"Love Like This"	Yes	Yong Jun-hyung, Kim Tae-sung, Joo Chanyang	Yes	Kim Tae-sung, Joo Chanyang, Secret Weapon
2018	Shake You Up	Rainz	"Music Up"	Yes	Joo Chanyang	Yes	Kim Tae-sung, Joo Chanyang, Secret Weapon
2018	Outro	HIGHLIGHT	"Leave Me Alone" (Junhyung & Gikwang)	Yes	Yong Jun-hyung	Yes	Good Life
2021	The Blowing	HIGHLIGHT	"NOT THE END"	Yes	Joo Chanyang, Lavin	Yes	Joo Chanyang, Lavin
2021	The Blowing	HIGHLIGHT	"Hey Yeah"	Yes	Kim Sooyoon, Moon Kim	Yes	Kim Tae-sung, Moon Kim, NOD, Ahn Seong-chan, Kim Yong-shin
2022	Daydream	HIGHLIGHT	"Night Fog"	Yes	Noday	Yes	Noday, Riskypizza
2022	Daydream	HIGHLIGHT	"Don't Leave"	Yes	VO3E, Kim Jeung-jung, ZNEE	Yes	VO3E, Frederik Jyll
2022	Daydream	HIGHLIGHT	"PLAY"	Yes	Sooyoon	Yes	Big Sancho, Moon Kim, Kim So-ming
2022	Daydream	HIGHLIGHT	"Whatever"	Yes	NOD, Park Sol, Gyuberlake	Yes	NOD, Park Sol, Gyuberlake, Moon Kim
2022	Daydream	HIGHLIGHT	"Classic"	Yes	Noday, Gyuberlake	Yes	Noday, Gyuberlake, WONJUN

== Filmography ==
=== Film ===
Year	Title	Role	Notes	Ref.
2012	A Turtle's Tale 2: Sammy's Escape from Paradise	Ricky	voice-dubbing	

=== Television series ===
Year	Title	Role	Ref.
2009	High Kick Through the Roof	Kang Se-ho	
2011	My Princess	Geon-yi	
2011	Me Too, Flower!	Jo Ma-roo / Pink Chicken	
2013	My Friend Is Still Alive	Kyeong-sook	
2014	20's (Twenty Years Old)	Gi-kwang	
2015	Mrs. Cop	Lee Se-won	
2016	Monster	young Lee Gook-cheol / Kang Ki-tan (20s)	
2016	Momin's Room	Wonee	
2017	Circle	Lee Ho-soo	
2018	Lovely Horribly	Lee Sung-joong	
2024	Marry My Husband	Baek Eun-ho	
TBA	I Kill You	Ho-joong	

=== Television shows ===
Year	Title	Role	Notes	Ref.
2009	Diary of AJ	Cast Member		
2010–2012	Hot Brothers	Cast Member		
2011	Inkigayo	Host		
2011–2012	Win Win	Host		
2014	Style Log	Host	with Gayoon and Do Sang-woo	
2017	The Dynamic Duo 7	Cast member		
2017	Love 10	Host	with Sung Si-kyung	
2018	Why Not?: The Dancer	Cast member		
2018	God of Football	Host	with Jeong Jin-woon	
2018	Battle Trip	Contestant	with Doojoon (Episode 81-82)	
2018	Dancing High	Dance coach		
2020	Idol Wonderland	Host	with Kang Yu-chan	
2021	Brad PT & GYM Carry	Host	with Kim Sook and Lee Hyun-yi	
2023	Peak Time	Judge		
2024	Make Mate 1	Special host		

=== Web shows ===
Year	Title	Role	Notes	Ref.
2021	MuzieKwang Company	Host	Fake documentary entertainment	
2021	Soldier Idol Camp	Cast Member		
2025	I am Kolmar (나는콜마)	Host	Interviewing regular people about their use of cosmetics.	

=== Radio show ===
Year	Title	Role	Notes	Ref.
2022–2023	Gikwang's Song Plaza	DJ	March 14, 2022– April 16, 2023	

=== Hosting ===
Year	Title	Notes	Ref.
2022	KCON 2022 Premiere	Special MC; May 7, 2022 – May 8, 2022	

== Concerts ==
=== Korean tours ===
- LEEGIKWANG Mini LIVE 2018 <ONE> - Blue Square I Market Hall, Seoul (January 27–28, 2018)
- LEEGIKWANG LIVE 2019 [I] - Blue Square I Market Hall, Seoul (March 23–24, 2019)

=== Japan tours ===
- LEEGIKWANG Mini LIVE 2018 <ONE> in Japan - Mynavi BLITZ Akasaka, Tokyo (July 22, 2018)
- LEEGIKWANG LIVE 2019 [I] in Japan - Toyosu PIT by Team Smile, Tokyo (13 April 2019)

=== Taiwan tours ===
- LEEGIKWANG LIVE 2019 [I] in Taiwan - Taiwan TICC Hall, Taipei (30 March 2019)

== Awards and nominations ==
Name of the award ceremony, year presented, category, nominee of the award, and the result of the nomination
Award ceremony	Year	Category	Nominee / Work	Result	Ref.
I-Magazine Fashion Face Award	2016	Asian Male	Lee Gi-kwang	Won	
I-Magazine Fashion Face Award	2017	Asian Male	Lee Gi-kwang	Won	
KBS Drama Awards	2018	Best New Actor	Lovely Horribly	Nominated	
KBS Entertainment Awards	2022	DJ of the Year Award	Lee Gi-kwang's Song Plaza	Won	
MBC Drama Awards	2011	Best New Actor	My Princess	Won	
MBC Entertainment Awards	2010	Popularity Award	Hot Brothers	Won	
