= Yang Yo-seob =

South Korean singer (born 1990)

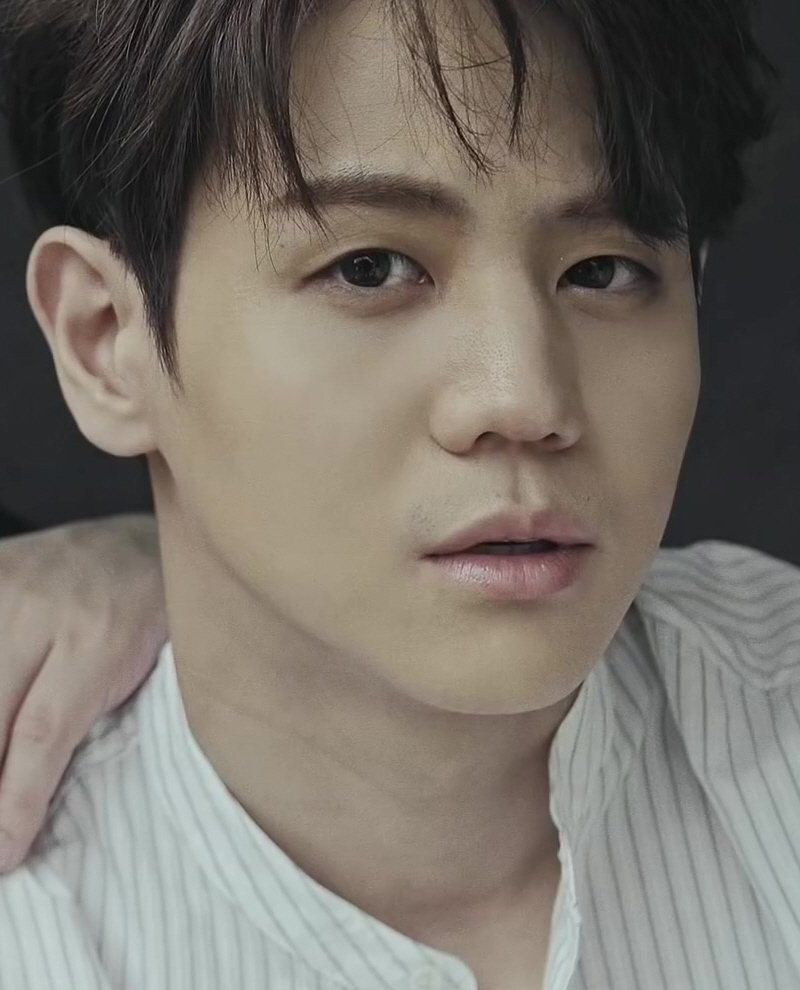
- Yang in June 2016
- Born: January 5, 1990 (age 36); Seoul, South Korea
- Education: Dong-ah Institute of Media and Arts
- Occupations: Singer; musical actor
- Musical career
- Genres: K-pop; R&B
- Instrument: Vocals
- Years active: 2009–present
- Labels: Cube; Around Us
- Member of: Highlight; Dramatic Blue
- Website: aroundusent.com

Korean name
- Hangul: 양요섭
- Hanja: 梁曜燮
- RR: Yang Yoseop
- MR: Yang Yosŏp

Yang Yo-seob (Korean: 양요섭; born January 5, 1990), known mononymously as Yoseob, is a South Korean singer and musical actor. He is the main vocalist of the boy group Highlight.

== Biography ==
Yang was born in Seoul, South Korea on January 5, 1990, in a small family with one older sister, Yang Hae-yeon. His name Yoseob was the Hanja version of the name Joseph, which was later sinicized by the decision of his grand father. He first gained interest in music and started practicing singing after listening to Brian McKnight's music. He then listened to a lot of music of a similar style, but realized that he should not be biased towards a certain genre and started listening to dance music and rock as well. When he was in high school, he joined a school band where he performed a lot of hard rock and metal during their performances. Yang wanted to try modern rock; however, his seniors at that time said that it would ruin the mood and ultimately not be a success.

Yang became a JYP Entertainment trainee, but left after receiving a bad grade from practice reviews. He moved agencies, to M Boat Entertainment (a former sister company of YG Entertainment) where he was trained for five years before transferring to Cube Entertainment where he became a member of Beast. While still a trainee at Cube Entertainment, he became a backup dancer for AJ, his soon-to-be group member and former high school friend, now known as Lee Gi-kwang, in the music videos and live performances of "Wiping the Tears" and "Dancing Shoes".

Yang is the main vocalist of Beast. He released a digital single together with Dalmatian's Daniel titled "First Snow and First Kiss" and participated in singing original sound tracks (OSTs) for various Korean dramas such as "Happy Birthday" for More Charming by the Day, "I Cherish That Person" for My Princess, and "Loving You" for All My Love. Yang has also participated in various TV shows, including KBS' Oh! My School.

Yang attended Dong-ah Institute of Media and Arts, formerly known as Dong-Ah Broadcasting College, and graduated in 2014.

On January 24, 2019, Yang began his mandatory military service as a conscripted police officer and was discharged on August 30, 2020.

== Career ==
=== Highlight (formerly known as Beast) ===
The group has released five studio albums, thirteen Korean EPs and various singles. Yang is the main vocalist.

=== Solo career ===
Along with fellow Beast member Junhyung, MC Lee Hyukjae, Moon Heejun (formerly of H.O.T.) and Kim Sook, Yang welcomed Japanese tourists for the "Visit Seoul 2010" campaign, where Korean celebrities and Japanese tourists explored Seoul through MBC's Star Guide Doshiraku to boost visibility of Seoul's famous landmarks and cuisine. On July 16, 2010, Yang participated in the official soundtrack of the Korean drama More Charming By The Day as part of its promotional campaign, with the song "Happy Birthday".

On November 29, 2010, Yang released a digital single together with Dalmatian's Daniel titled "First Snow and First Kiss". Both were friends from their trainee years at M Boat Entertainment and had released a UCC series, "To Pick On Mr. Daniel", which became a hot topic when it was selected as number one amongst the weekly TOP 5 UCCs by a sports newspaper. He also became a permanent cast member on KBS' Oh! My School (a.k.a. 100 Points out of 100), along with other idols such as MBLAQ's Lee Joon, Secret's Hyoseong, T-ara's Soyeon, Miss A's Min, and Simon Dominic.

Yang was cast in his first musical as Ji Yong in Kwang Hwa Moon Love Song. The musical started its performances on March 20, 2011, and ended on April 10, 2011. He also contributed to the soundtrack of My Princess, with the song "Cherish That Person" which was released on February 7, 2011. On May 1, 2011, KBS announced plans of creating a new singing variety program featuring an all idol cast titled Immortal Songs 2 – Sing the Legends; Yang was one of the artists cast in the original line-ups. He received first place on the show's pilot episode with his performance of "Eomma (엄마, lit. Mother)", which helped silence the critics that had dismissed his singing abilities as just a hype. However, on June 8, 2011, the show announced that Yang would leave the show due to his conflicting overseas promotions schedule with Beast. He expressed that although he felt extremely stressed competing against his peers, he felt regret having to leave. Yang said "when we decided on the withdrawal, I did feel some relief. It was too nerve-wracking and burdensome. However, at the same time, I felt regret. I don't think I was able to show my all. If another opportunity came by to be on the show again, I would definitely take it. I think I will. I want to show different sides of myself."

Yang was featured in Bang Yong-guk's first solo track, "I Remember" which was jointly composed by Bang and One Way's Chance. The track has gained a lot of interest from netizens and become a hot topic. Yang was not able to sing "I Remember" with Bang Yongguk live.

On September 27, 2011, KBS' Poseidon released part one of their original soundtrack series which featured Yang’s vocals. His song, "No", was a collaboration piece between Rado (of Huh Gak's "Hello") and production duo Ji In and Wontag, the men behind MBLAQ's latest releases. The song features sorrowful lyrics of a man who has no choice but to let go of his lover.

Yang released his solo album on November 26, 2012. All five songs were produced by fellow band member, Jun Hyung, including the title song, "Caffeine". A music video for "Caffeine" was released two days later, on November 28. A music video for his song "Even then, I" was released on February 14, 2013, as a valentines gift for his fans.

Yang was chosen as one of the judges and coaches in Mnet The Voice Korea Kids or Voice Kids for short. The contestants were between the ages of 6–14 years old. He was also chosen as the most desired coach by the contestants of Voice Kids.

Yang joined MBC's I Live Alone, a real-variety show that showcases the daily lives of single celebrities (men) who live alone.

In December 2013, he starred as the title character in a Seoul production of Joseph and the Amazing Technicolor Dreamcoat and was mentioned in the New York Times.

Yang left I Live Alone in which he received much love as the youngest member of the show after a short six months on broadcast due to his responsibilities and schedules as a member of Beast. He said that due to their Japan Tour 2014, along with their upcoming comeback planned to be in April 2014, he would be unable to participate in the show.

It was announced in March 2014 that Yang would be participating in the musical-remake of the 2004 hit romantic comedy drama series Full House as the lead character, Lee Young-jae. The musical was on stage in April 2014.

On September 20, 2021, Yang released his first studio album Chocolate Box, with "Brain" serving as the lead single.

== Discography ==
=== Studio albums ===
- Chocolate Box (2021)

=== Songwriting credits ===
Year	Album	Artist	Song	Lyrics		Music	
Year	Album	Artist	Song	Credited	With	Credited	With
2009	Beast Is the B2ST	BEAST	"Beast Is the B2ST"	Yes	BEAST	No	Shin Sa Dong Tiger, Choi Gyu Seong
2009	Beast Is the B2ST	BEAST	"Bad Girl"	Yes	BEAST, Lee Sang Ho, Shin Sa Dong Tiger	No	Lee Sang Ho, Shin Sa Dong Tiger
2010	My Story	BEAST (Yoseob & Junhyung)	"Thank To"	Yes	Yong Jun-hyung	Yes	Yong Jun-hyung, Shinsadong
2016	Highlight	BEAST	"Practice"	Yes	Yong Jun-hyung, Gyuberlake	Yes	Gyuberlake
2016	Highlight	BEAST (Yoseob Solo)	"Come Out"	Yes	Gyuberlake	Yes	Gyuberlake
2017	Can You Feel It?	HIGHLIGHT	"Beginning"	Yes	Yong Jun-hyung, Gyuberlake	Yes	Gyuberlake
2017	The Emperor: Owner of the Mask OST	Yoseob	"The Tree"	Yes	Gyuberlake	Yes	Gyuberlake
2018	White	Yoseob	"Where I Am Gone"	Yes	Gyuberlake	Yes	Gyuberlake
2018	White	Yoseob	"Star"	Yes	Gyuberlake	Yes	Gyuberlake
2018	White	Yoseob	"Beginning (Solo ver.)"	Yes	Gyuberlake	Yes	Gyuberlake
2018	White	Yoseob	"Yang Yoseob"	Yes	Gyuberlake	Yes	Gyuberlake
2018	White	Yoseob	"Consolation"	Yes	Gyuberlake	No	1601
2018	Outro	HIGHLIGHT	"Wind" (Yoseob & Dongwoon)	Yes	Son Dong-woon, Gyuberlake	Yes	Son Dong-woon, Gyuberlake
2019	20 Full Moons	Yoseob	"With you"	Yes	Gyuberlake	Yes	Gyuberlake
2019	20 Full Moons	Yoseob	"Moonlight"	Yes	Gyuberlake	Yes	Gyuberlake

== Filmography ==
=== Variety shows ===
Year	Title	Role	Note
2011	School Variety 100 Points Out of 100	MC/Fixed cast	
2011	Immortal Songs	Guest	
2012	1 vs. 100	Guest	Episode 260
2013	The Voice Kids – Korea	Judge/Coach	
2013	I Live Alone	Cast	Episode 28-45
2015	Let's Eat with Friends	Cast	
2016	Law of the Jungle (in East Timor)	Cast	
2017	Fantastic Duo Season 2	MC	
2020–2021	King of Mask Singer	Contestant	as "Buttumak Cat" (episodes 273–290)
2022	Artistock Game	User agent	

=== Television dramas ===
Year	Title	Role	Notes
2012	Seoyoung, My Daughter	Yang Yo-seob	Cameo – Episode 25
2015	Let's Eat 2	Yang Yo-seob	Cameo – Episode 16

=== Web shows ===
Year	Title	Role	Notes	Ref.
2020	COMEBACK SHOW MU:TALK LIVE	Host		
2022	Delivery 2	Host	with Son Dong-woon	
2022	My Playlist	Host	with Seo Eun-kwang	

=== Musical theatre ===
Year	Title	Role	Notes
2011	Gwanghwamun Sonata	Ji Yong	Lead Role
2013	Joseph and the Amazing Technicolor Dreamcoat	Joseph	Lead Role
2014	Full House	Lee Young-jae	Lead Role
2014	Zorro	Zorro	Lead Role
2015	Robin Hood	Prince Philip	Lead Role
2015	Cinderella	Prince Christopher	Lead Role
2017	Those Days	Moo Young	Lead Role
2020	Those Days	Moo Young	Lead Role
2021–2022	Something Rotten	Nick Bottom	Lead Role

=== Radio shows ===
Year	Title	Role	Ref.
2018–2019	Yang Yoseob's Dreaming Radio	DJ	
2022	Gikwang's Song Plaza	Special DJ	

== Concerts ==
=== Korean tours ===
- 2018 YANG YOSEOB Solo Concert <白> - Kyunghee University Grand Peace Palace, Seoul (June 16–17, 2018)

== Awards and nominations ==
=== Golden Ticket Awards ===
Year	Nominee / work	Award	Result
2012	Himself	Musical Rising Star Award	Won

=== Mnet Asian Music Awards ===
Year	Nominee / work	Award	Result
2013	"Caffeine"	Best Dance Performance – Male Solo	Nominated

=== SBS MTV Best of the Best ===
Year	Nominee / work	Award	Result
2013	"Caffeine"	Best Male Artist	Won

=== Golden Disc Awards ===
Year	Nominee / work	Award	Result
2018	"白"	Bonsang (Album)	Nominated

=== MBC Entertainment Awards ===
Year	Nominee / work	Award	Result
2018	Himself	Best Newcomer Award (Radio)	Won
