= Around Us Entertainment =

South Korean company

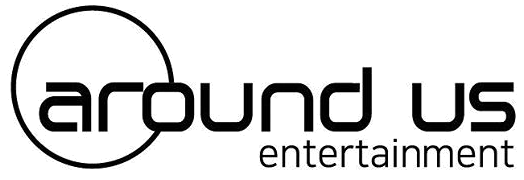
- Type: Private
- Industry: Entertainment
- Genre: K-pop; dance; R&B
- Founded: December 9, 2016
- Founders: Yoon Doo-joon; Yang Yo-seob; Lee Gi-kwang; Son Dong-woon; Yong Jun-hyung
- Headquarters: Seoul, South Korea
- Subsidiaries: With Us Entertainment
- Website: http://www.aroundusent.com/

Around Us Entertainment is a South Korean independent entertainment company established by Yoon Doo-joon, Yang Yo-seob, Lee Gi-kwang, Son Dong-woon, and Yong Jun-hyung from boy group Highlight, formerly known as Beast, after leaving their former label Cube Entertainment.

== History ==
After the BEAST members' contracts with Cube Entertainment expired, they decided to set up their own independent company for their future promotions. The name Around Us was coined "with the desire to be closer with and engage more people frequently". The label aims "to create music and content that everyone can easily enjoy anywhere around us". In February 2017, the former BEAST members rebranded themselves as Highlight, after deciding to cease their legal disputes over the copyright of the name BEAST with their former agency Cube Entertainment.

On November 15, 2021, company co-founder and former Highlight member Junhyung officially left the label.

== Artists ==
=== Groups ===
- Highlight
- The Wind

=== Soloists ===
- Yang Yo-seob
- Lee Gi-kwang
- Son Dong-woon
- Yoon Doo-joon

=== Songwriters ===
- Yoon Doo-joon
- Yang Yo-seob
- Lee Gi-kwang
- Son Dong-woon

=== Actors ===
- Lee Gi-kwang
- Yoon Doo-joon

== Former artists ==
- Highlight
  - Yong Jun-hyung (2016–2021)
- The Wind
  - Shin Jae-won (2023)
