= Yong Jun-hyung =

South Korean musician and actor (born 1989)

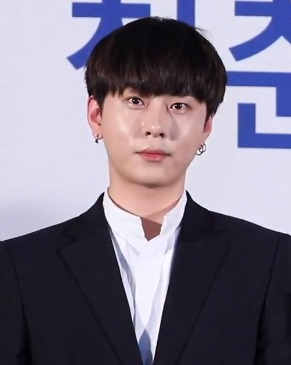
- Yong in May 2018
- Born: Yong Jae-soon; December 19, 1989 (age 36); Seoul, South Korea
- Occupations: Singer-songwriter; rapper; record producer; actor
- Spouse: Hyuna (m. 2024)
- Musical career
- Genres: K-pop; hip hop
- Instruments: Vocals; piano
- Years active: 2007–2019; 2022–present
- Labels: Around Us; Cube; Black Made
- Formerly of: Xing; Highlight; United Cube

Korean name
- Hangul: 용준형
- RR: Yong Junhyeong
- MR: Yong Chunhyŏng

Former name
- Hangul: 용재순
- RR: Yong Jaesun
- MR: Yong Chaesun

Yong Jun-hyung (Korean: 용준형; born Yong Jae-soon, December 19, 1989), known mononymously as Junhyung, is a South Korean singer-songwriter, record producer and actor. He rose to fame as a member of South Korean boy band Highlight (formerly known as Beast), formed in 2009. He departed from Highlight in 2019, amidst a controversy where he admitted to having watched a video of singer Jung Joon-young making out with a woman, which was filmed with consent but shared without.

As a solo artist, he released one extended play, Flower (2013), and one full-length album, Goodbye 20's (2018). He also starred in the Korean dramas Monstar (2013) and Coffee, Do Me a Favor (2018).

== Early life and education ==
Yong was born in Seoul, South Korea. He changed his birth name Yong Jae-soon (Korean: 용재순) to his current name when he was in 6th grade.

== Career ==
=== 2007: Pre-debut ===
In 2007, he joined the boy band Xing, which included Kevin Woo (ex-U-KISS). Yong was known by the stage name Poppin' Dragon while in Xing.

=== 2009–2016: Debut with Beast (now known as Highlight) ===
Yong debuted under Cube Entertainment as a member of the boy band Beast in 2009. The group released their first extended play Beast Is the B2ST on October 14, 2009. The group released a total of eight extended plays and three studio albums.

=== 2010–2018: Solo activities and discography with Highlight ===
In 2010, Yong was featured as a rapper in songs by other artists, including Hyuna's debut single "Change," the Asian remix of Amerie's "Heard 'em All," and G.NA's single "I'll Back Off So You Can Live Better." In 2011, Yong was featured on the songs "Heartsore Story" by Wheesung, "A Bitter Day" by Hyuna, "Be Quiet" by Kim Wan-sun, and "Don't Act Countrified" by ALi.

Yong released his first solo single, "Living Without You," on February 3, 2012. The song reached #8 on the Gaon Digital Chart. That summer, he made a cameo appearance on the sitcom Salamander Guru and The Shadows. Later that year, he produced fellow Beast member Yang Yo-seob's debut solo EP, The First Collage, and was featured on the lead single, "Caffeine."

In February 2013, Yong released the single "You Got Some Nerve" with LE of EXID and Feeldog of Big Star. The song reached #13 on the Gaon Digital Chart. Starting in May, Yong starred in the Korean drama Monstar, alongside Ha Yeon-soo and Kang Ha-neul. The series aired on Mnet and wrapped up in August. Yong won Best New Actor at the 2013 Korean Drama Awards for his depiction of a teen idol in the series.

Yong released his debut solo EP, Flower, on December 13, 2013. The EP debuted at #4 on the Gaon Album Chart, and the title track "Flower" peaked at #23 on the Gaon Digital Chart.

In 2015, Yong starred in the Cube Entertainment online reality series, Yong Jun-hyung's Good Life, alongside his songwriting and music production partner Kim Tae-joo. From 2016 to 2017, he co-hosted the third season of the variety show Hitmaker alongside comedian Jeong Hyeong-don. In 2017, Yong was also a cast member on the first season of the variety show It's Dangerous Beyond the Blankets. He returned to the show for the second season in 2018.

In 2016, Beast left Cube Entertainment, and formed their own label, Around Us Entertainment. The group debuted under the new name of Highlight. As Highlight, they released two extended plays.

Yong released his first solo full-length album, Goodbye 20's, on May 9, 2018. The album debuted at #2 on the Gaon Album Chart. That year, he also starred in the Korean drama, Coffee, Do Me a Favor, which is based on the webtoon of the same name.

=== 2019–2021: Career hiatus ===
On March 14, Yong announced on Instagram that he was leaving Highlight, following new revelations regarding the KakaoTalk chatrooms scandal, saying he had watched a video sent to him by Jung Joon-young, which was later revealed being a video of Jung and a woman making out in a bar which was filmed with consent but shared to him without, and in one other instance having got knowledge of Jung filming another woman without her consent.

On November 15, 2021, Yong left Around Us Entertainment after his contract expired.

=== 2022–present: Solo activities ===
On September 27, 2022, it was announced that Yong would be releasing a new album in the near future, which would be his first solo comeback in four years and also his first since his departure from Around Us Entertainment. On October 11, he announced his first EP Loner, set to release on October 30, under his independent label Black Made.

In October 2022 it was confirmed that Yong will hold his solo concert 'LONER's ROOM' at Yes24 Live Hall in Seoul on November 4 and 5, and will make a comeback with his new EP album "Loner" on October 30. However, the label announced the postponement of the album due to the national mourning period following the Seoul Halloween crowd crush incident on the 29th. And his solo concert was postponed as well. Yong had confirmed the release schedule for the new album on November 10.

On March 2, 2023, Yong released "POST IT" (Feat. Xion) with the same name and "Til' the End", both composed by him.

== Controversy ==
On March 11, 2019, the television program SBS Eight O'Clock News incorrectly reported that Yong was part of a group chatroom where musician Jung Joon-young shared hidden camera sex videos with acquaintances. On March 12, Yong clarified that, even though he had a chat with Jung, he was not part of the group chatroom. Seoul Metropolitan Police stated in April that they questioned him as a witness in the Jung Joon-young KakaoTalk chatrooms case. In December, KBS News reported that the video Jung had sent to Yong depicted Jung consensually touching and filming a woman in a bar in Gangnam in November 2015, but the video was shared without her consent.

== Philanthropy ==
On March 7, 2022, Yong donated 10 million won to the Hope Bridge Disaster Relief Association to help the victims of the massive wildfire that started in Uljin, Gyeongbuk and has spread to Samcheok, Gangwon.

== Personal life ==
=== Military service ===
He quietly enlisted for his mandatory military service on April 2, 2019 as an active duty soldier. On September 25, 2020, it was announced that Yong had suffered a knee injury, and he would complete the rest of his service as a public service worker. He was discharged on February 26, 2021.

=== Marriage ===
On July 8, 2024, Hyuna and Yong's agencies jointly released an official statement saying that the two will be getting married in October. Their wedding ceremony will be held in private with their close friends.

== Discography ==
- Goodbye 20's (2018)

== Filmography ==
=== Reality shows ===
Year	Title	Network	Role	Notes	Ref.
2015	Yong Jun-hyung's Good Life	Cube TV	Himself	With Kim Tae-joo	

=== Variety shows ===
Year	Title	Network	Role	Notes	Ref.
2016–2017	Hitmaker Season 3	MBC Every1	Host	Co-hosted with Jeong Hyeong-don	
2017–2018	It's Dangerous Beyond the Blankets	MBC	Cast member	Ep. 1-4 (Season 1); Ep. 8-10 (Season 2)	

=== Dramas ===
Year	Title	Role	Notes	Ref.
2012	Salamander Guru and The Shadows	Joker	Cameo	
2013	Monstar	Yoon Seol-chan	Lead role	
2018	Coffee, Do Me a Favor	Im Hyun-woo	Lead role	

== Concert ==
- LONER's ROOM (2023)

== Awards and nominations ==
Year	Award	Category	Recipient	Result	Ref.
2013	7th Mnet 20's Choice Awards	20's Hot Cover Music – "Past Days"	Monstar	Nominated	
2013	7th Mnet 20's Choice Awards	20's Booming Star – Male	Monstar	Nominated	
2013	6th Korea Drama Awards	Best Couple Award with Ha Yeon-soo	Monstar	Nominated	
2013	6th Korea Drama Awards	Best New Actor	Monstar	Won	
2018	MBC Plus X Genie Music Awards	Artist of the Year	—N/a	Nominated	
2018	MBC Plus X Genie Music Awards	Song of the Year	"Sudden Shower" (Feat. 10 cm)	Nominated	
2018	MBC Plus X Genie Music Awards	Male Artist Award	—N/a	Nominated	
2018	MBC Plus X Genie Music Awards	Rap/Hip Hop Music Award	"Sudden Shower" (Feat. 10 cm)	Nominated	
2018	MBC Plus X Genie Music Awards	Genie Music Popularity Award	—N/a	Nominated	
2018	Melon Music Awards	Top 10 (Bonsang)	—N/a	Nominated	
2018	Melon Music Awards	Best Ballad Track Award	"Sudden Shower" (Feat. 10 cm)	Nominated	
2018	Korea Popular Music Awards	Best Digital Song	"Sudden Shower" (Feat. 10 cm)	Nominated	
2018	Korea Popular Music Awards	Best Artist	—N/a	Nominated	
2018	Korea Popular Music Awards	Popularity Award	—N/a	Nominated	
2018	Seoul Music Awards	Bonsang	—N/a	Nominated	
2018	Seoul Music Awards	Popularity Award	—N/a	Nominated	
2018	Seoul Music Awards	K-wave Popularity Award	—N/a	Nominated	
2018	Golden Disc Awards	Bonsang (Digital)	"Sudden Shower" (Feat. 10 cm)	Nominated	
2018	Gaon Chart Music Awards	Song of the Year (March)	"Sudden Shower" (Feat. 10 cm)	Nominated	
