= Highlight discography =

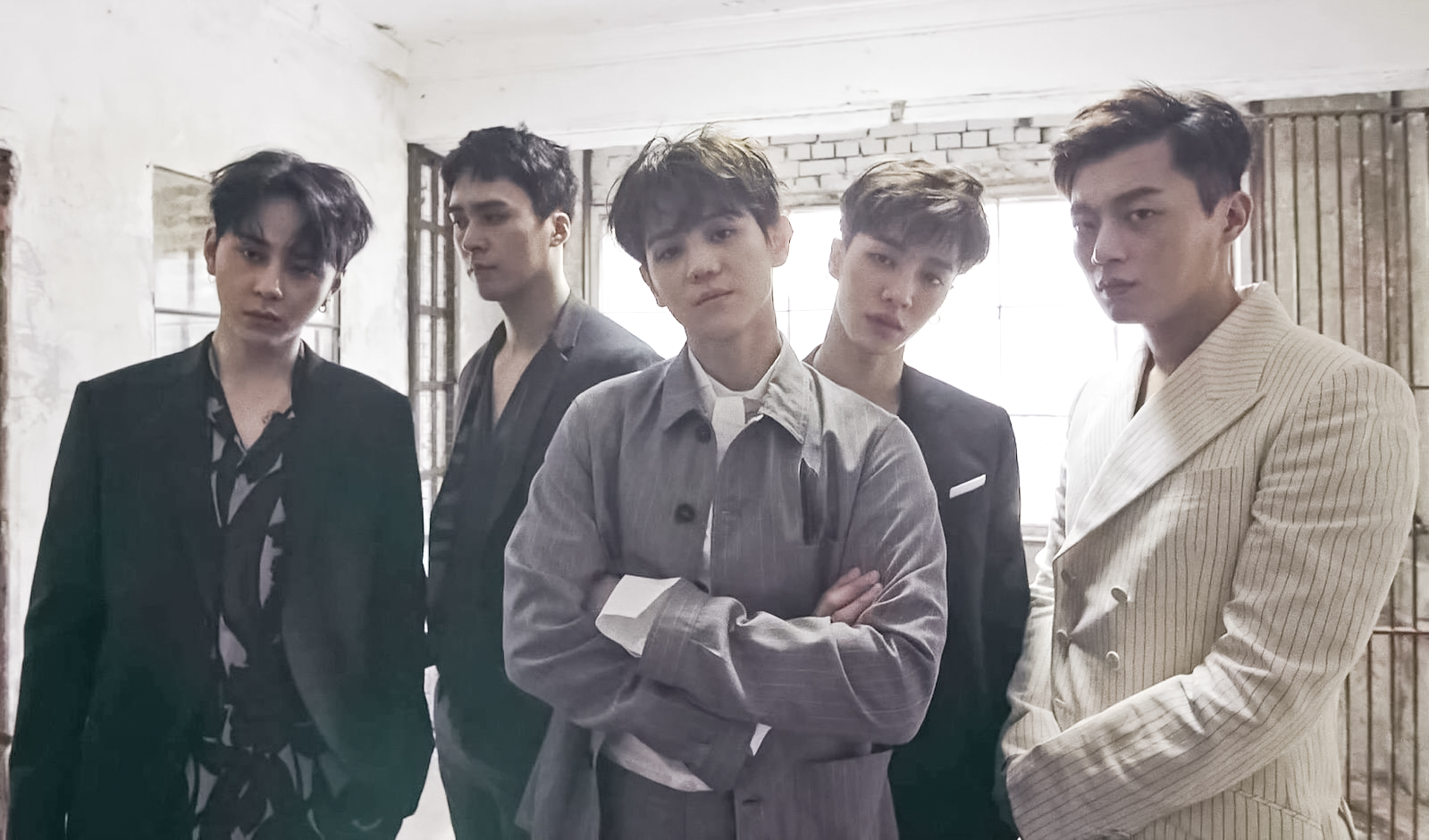
- (L to R) Junhyung, Dongwoon, Yoseob, Gikwang, Doojoon
- Studio albums: 6
- Extended plays: 16
- Compilation albums: 3
- Singles: 45
- Music videos: 42

This is the discography of the South Korean idol boy group Highlight formerly known as Beast. Beast have been in the music business ever since making their live debut on KBS Music Bank with their debut track, "Bad Girl" on October 16, 2009. They have released six studio albums and thirteen extended plays and have also participated in singing OSTs of various Korean dramas.

In 2016, Beast moved labels from Cube Entertainment to Around Us Entertainment and subsequently re-branded their name to 'Highlight' in 2017.

== Albums ==
=== Studio albums ===
List of studio albums, with selected chart positions and sales
| Title | Album details | Peak chart positions | | | | Sales |
| Title | Album details | KOR | JPN | JPN Hot | US World | Sales |
|---|---|---|---|---|---|---|
| Fiction and Fact | Released: May 17, 2011 (KOR); Label: Cube Entertainment; Formats: CD, digital download | 1 | — | — | — | KOR: 164,264; JPN: 3,806 |
| So Beast | Released: August 10, 2011 (JPN); Label: Far Eastern Tribe, Cube; Formats: CD, digital download | 28 | 3 | — | — | JPN: 73,219; KOR: 5,478 |
| Hard to Love, How to Love | Released: July 19, 2013 (KOR); Label: Cube Entertainment; Formats: CD, digital download | 1 | 18 | — | 6 | KOR: 105,978; JPN: 16,772 |
| Guess Who? | Released: March 16, 2016 (JPN); Label: Beast Music; Formats: CD, digital download | — | 2 | 26 | — | JPN: 23,514 |
| Highlight | Released: July 4, 2016 (KOR); Label: Cube Entertainment; Formats: CD, digital download | 1 | 52 | — | 9 | KOR: 77,362; JPN: 1,455 |
| Daydream | Released: March 21, 2022 (KOR); Label: Around Us Entertainment; Formats: CD, digital download | 4 | — | — | — | KOR: 91,807 |
"—" denotes releases that did not chart.

=== Compilation albums ===
List of compilation albums, with selected chart positions and sales
| Title | Album details | Peak chart positions | Sales |
| Title | Album details | JPN | Sales |
|---|---|---|---|
| Beast – Japan Premium Edition | Released: November 11, 2010 (JPN); Label: Far Eastern Tribe; Format: CD | 13 | JPN: 14,354 |
| Beast Works 2009–2013 | Released: April 14, 2014 (JPN); Label: Universal Music Group; Format: CD | 33 | |
| Beast Japan Best | Released: September 17, 2014 (JPN); Label: Universal Music Group; Format: CD | 25 | JPN: 3,869 |

== Extended plays ==
List of extended plays, with selected chart positions and sales
| Title | Details | Peak chart positions | | | | Sales |
| Title | Details | KOR | JPN | JPN Hot | US World | Sales |
|---|---|---|---|---|---|---|
| Beast Is the B2ST | Released: October 14, 2009; Label: Cube Entertainment; Formats: CD, digital download | 11 | — | — | — | KOR: 43,532 |
| Shock of the New Era | Released: March 1, 2010; Label: Cube Entertainment; Formats: CD, digital download | 2 | — | — | — | KOR: 86,849 |
| Mastermind | Released: September 28, 2010; Label: Cube Entertainment; Format: CD, digital download | 2 | — | — | — | KOR: 75,275 |
| Lights Go On Again | Released: November 9, 2010; Label: Cube Entertainment; Formats: CD, digital download | 1 | — | — | — | KOR: 96,277 |
| My Story | Released: December 21, 2010; Label: Cube Entertainment, Universal Music Group; Formats: Digital download | — | — | — | — | —N/a |
| Midnight Sun | Released: July 22, 2012; Label: Cube Entertainment, Universal Music Group; Formats: CD, digital download | 1 | 13 | — | 15 | KOR: 150,151; JPN: 24,679 |
| Good Luck | Released: June 16, 2014; Label: Cube Entertainment, Universal Music Group; Formats: CD, digital download | 1 | 43 | — | 7 | KOR: 136,638; JPN: 6,733 |
| Time | Released: October 20, 2014; Label: Cube Entertainment, Universal Music Group; Formats: CD, digital download | 1 | 39 | — | 11 | KOR: 72,605; JPN: 4,736 |
| Ordinary | Released: July 27, 2015; Label: Cube Entertainment, Universal Music Group; Formats: CD, digital download | 1 | 40 | — | — | KOR: 87,524; JPN: 2,168 |
| Can You Feel It? | Released: March 20, 2017; Label: Around Us Entertainment; Formats: CD, digital download | 1 | 59 | — | 9 | KOR: 152,848; JPN: 4,287 |
| Can You Feel It? | Re-released (Calling You): May 29, 2017; Label: Around Us Entertainment; Formats: CD, digital download | 2 | — | — | — | KOR: 152,848; JPN: 4,287 |
| Celebrate | Released: October 16, 2017; Label: Around Us Entertainment; Formats: CD, digital download | 2 | 49 | 78 | 9 | KOR: 113,154; JPN: 2,021 |
| Outro | Released: November 20, 2018; Label: Around Us Entertainment; Formats: CD, digital download | 4 | — | 100 | — | KOR: 47,937 |
| The Blowing | Released: May 3, 2021; Label: Around Us Entertainment; Formats: CD, digital download | 2 | — | 39 | — | KOR: 111,968 |
| After Sunset | Released: November 7, 2022; Label: Around Us Entertainment; Formats: CD, digital download | 2 | — | — | — | KOR: 139,000 |
| Switch On | Released: March 11, 2024; Label: Around Us Entertainment; Formats: CD, digital download | 3 | 47 | — | — | KOR: 107,706; JPN: 735 |
| From Real to Surreal | Released: April 28, 2025; Label: Around Us Entertainment; Formats: CD, digital download | 2 | — | — | — | KOR: 110,569 |
"—" denotes releases that did not chart.

== Singles ==
=== Korean singles ===
List of Korean singles, with selected chart positions and sales
| Title | Year | Peak chart positions | | | Sales | Album |
| Title | Year | KOR Circle | KOR Hot | US World | Sales | Album |
Beast
| "Bad Girl" | 2009 | —N/a | —N/a | — | | Beast Is the B2ST |
| "Mystery" | 2009 | 22 | —N/a | — | KOR: 1,371,314 | Beast Is the B2ST |
| "Shock" | 2010 | 3 | —N/a | — | KOR: 2,108,155 | Shock of the New Era |
| "Breath" (숨) | 2010 | 4 | —N/a | — | KOR: 1,630,182 | Mastermind |
| "Beautiful" | 2010 | 6 | —N/a | — | KOR: 1,327,650 | Lights Go On Again |
| "On Rainy Days" (비가 오는 날엔) | 2011 | 3 | 68 | — | KOR: 3,061,053 | Fiction and Fact |
| "Fiction" | 2011 | 5 | 95 | — | KOR: 3,194,906 | Fiction and Fact |
| "I Knew It" (이럴 줄 알았어) | 2012 | 1 | 3 | — | KOR: 1,961,842 | Midnight Sun |
| "Midnight" (별 헤는 밤) | 2012 | 2 | 6 | — | KOR: 1,590,905 | Midnight Sun |
| "Beautiful Night" (아름다운 밤이야) | 2012 | 3 | 4 | 5 | KOR: 1,798,098 | Midnight Sun |
| "Will You Be Alright?" (괜찮겠니) | 2013 | 1 | 1 | — | KOR: 679,681 | Hard to Love, How to Love |
| "I'm Sorry" | 2013 | 4 | 11 | — | KOR: 354,888 | Hard to Love, How to Love |
| "Shadow" (그림자) | 2013 | 2 | 3 | — | KOR: 766,306 | Hard to Love, How to Love |
| "No More" (이젠 아니야) | 2014 | 1 | 2 | — | KOR: 459,612 | Good Luck |
| "Good Luck" | 2014 | 1 | 3 | 5 | KOR: 705,909 | Good Luck |
| "12:30" (12시 30분) | 2014 | 2 | —N/a | 8 | KOR: 711,240 | Time |
| "Gotta Go to Work" (일 하러 가야 돼) | 2015 | 4 | —N/a | — | KOR: 518,862 | Ordinary |
| "YeY" (예이) | 2015 | 3 | —N/a | 21 | KOR: 409,123 | Ordinary |
| "Butterfly" | 2016 | 8 | —N/a | — | KOR: 305,462 | Highlight |
| "Ribbon" (리본) | 2016 | 4 | —N/a | 17 | KOR: 624,483 | Highlight |
Highlight
| "It’s Still Beautiful" (아름답다) | 2017 | 6 | —N/a | — | KOR: 264,447 | Can You Feel It? |
| "Plz Don't Be Sad" (얼굴 찌푸리지 말아요) | 2017 | 1 | —N/a | 22 | KOR: 1,136,673 | Can You Feel It? |
| "Calling You" | 2017 | 3 | —N/a | — | KOR: 411,378 | Calling You |
| "Can Be Better" (어쩔 수 없지) | 2017 | 5 | —N/a | — | KOR: 238,960 | Celebrate |
| "Take Care" (잘 지내줘) | 2018 | 17 | —N/a | — | | Outro |
| "Loved" (사랑했나봐) | 2018 | 52 | — | | | Outro |
| "Not the End" (불어온다) | 2021 | 18 | 38 | — | | The Blowing |
| "Daydream" | 2022 | 22 | 37 | — | | Daydream |
| "Alone" | 2022 | 38 | — | — | | After Sunset |
| "Body" | 2024 | 89 | — | — | | Switch On |
| "Endless Ending" (없는 엔딩) (Note: Single was also released under the name "Beast".) | 2025 | 142 | — | — | | From Real to Surreal |
| "Chains" | 2025 | 98 | — | — | | From Real to Surreal |
| "Rainbow" | 2025 | — (Note: "Rainbow" did not enter the Circle Digital Chart, but peaked at number 19 on the component Download Chart.) | — | — | | Non-album single |
"—" denotes releases that did not chart.

=== Japanese singles ===
List of Japanese singles, with selected chart positions and sales
| Title | Year | Peak chart positions | | Sales | Album |
| Title | Year | JPN Oricon | JPN Hot | Sales | Album |
|---|---|---|---|---|---|
| "Shock" | 2011 | 2 | 5 | JPN: 60,486 | So Beast |
| "Bad Girl" | 2011 | 3 | 10 | JPN: 55,588 | So Beast |
| "Midnight (Hoshi wo Kazoeru Yoru)" | 2012 | 6 | 34 | JPN: 126,042 | BEAST Japan Best |
| "Sad Movie" / "Kurisumasu Kyaroru no Koro ni wa" (Sad Movie / クリスマスキャロルの頃には) | 2013 | 10 | 1 | JPN: 107,475 | BEAST Japan Best |
| "Adrenaline" | 2014 | 5 | 1 | JPN: 61,772 | BEAST Japan Best |
| "Kimi wa Dou?" (キミはどう?) | 2014 | 5 | 1 | JPN: 148,921 | Non-album single |
| "One" | 2015 | 3 | 4 | JPN: 49,896 | Guess Who? |
| "Hands Up" | 2015 | 4 | 9 | JPN: 45,010 | Guess Who? |
| "Can't Wait to Love You" | 2015 | 10 | 23 | JPN: 27,885 | Guess Who? |
| "This Is My Life" | 2015 | 9 | 26 | JPN: 23,270 | Guess Who? |
| "#TBM" | 2015 | 17 | 49 | JPN: 21,475 | Guess Who? |
| "YeY" | 2015 | 11 | 25 | JPN: 58,541 | Guess Who? |
| "Last Word" (最後の一言) | 2015 | 4 | 2 | JPN: 29,631 | Guess Who? |
| "All Is in You" | 2015 | 14 | 19 | JPN: 23,442 | Guess Who? |
| "Saigo no Hitokoto" | 2015 | 1 | 1 | JPN: 88,457 | Guess Who? |
| "Stay Forever Young" | 2015 | 7 | — | JPN: 21,524 | Guess Who? |
| "Guess Who?" | 2016 | 1 | 1 | JPN: 28,621 | Guess Who? |
| "Freaking Cute" | 2016 | 7 | 9 | JPN: 28,493 | Day/Night |
| "Whole Lotta Lovin" | 2016 | 6 | 11 | JPN: 26,530 | Day/Night |
"—" denotes releases that did not chart.

== Other charted songs ==
| Title | Year | Peak chart positions | | Sales | Album |
| Title | Year | KOR Circle | KOR Hot | Sales | Album |
|---|---|---|---|---|---|
| "Take Care of My Girlfriend (Say No)" | 2010 | 28 | — | | Shock of the New Era |
| "Special" | 2010 | 45 | — | | Shock of the New Era |
| "Just Before Shock" | 2010 | 58 | — | | Shock of the New Era |
| "Clenching a Tight Fist" | 2010 | 10 | — | | Mastermind |
| "V.I.U" | 2010 | 58 | — | | Mastermind |
| "Break Down" | 2010 | 66 | — | | Mastermind |
| "Mastermind" | 2010 | 72 | — | | Mastermind |
| "Easy" (Sincere Version) | 2010 | 18 | — | | Non-album single |
| "Lights Go On Again" | 2010 | 44 | — | | Lights Go On Again |
| "I Like You the Best" | 2010 | 55 | — | | Lights Go On Again |
| "Lightless" | 2010 | 61 | — | | Lights Go On Again |
| "I'm Sorry" | 2010 | 66 | — | | Lights Go On Again |
| "When the Door Closes" (Doojoon and Dongwoon) | 2010 | 20 | — | | My Story |
| "Thanks To" (Junhyung and Yoseob) | 2010 | 46 | — | | My Story |
| "Let It Snow" (Hyunseung and Gikwang) | 2010 | 87 | — | | My Story |
| "Niji" | 2011 | 31 | — | | With Special Guests: Fukuyama Masaharu Remake |
| "The Fact" | 2011 | 44 | — | KOR: 143,141 | Fiction and Fact |
| "Back to You" | 2011 | 50 | — | KOR: 126,489 | Fiction and Fact |
| "You" | 2011 | 52 | — | KOR: 121,206 | Fiction and Fact |
| "Though I Call Your Name" | 2011 | 62 | — | KOR: 74,099 | Fiction and Fact |
| "Freeze" | 2011 | 63 | — | KOR: 70,310 | Fiction and Fact |
| "Virus" | 2011 | 65 | — | KOR: 66,900 | Fiction and Fact |
| "Lightless" (Unplugged Ver.) | 2011 | 87 | — | KOR: 44,467 | Fiction and Fact |
| "Fiction" (Orchestra Ver.) | 2011 | 95 | — | KOR: 38,382 | Fiction and Fact |
| "When I Miss You" | 2012 | 15 | 22 | KOR: 522,570 | Midnight Sun |
| "It's Not Me" | 2012 | 24 | 42 | KOR: 413,586 | Midnight Sun |
| "Dream Girl" | 2012 | 32 | 52 | KOR: 93,891 | Midnight Sun |
| "The Day You Rest" | 2012 | 35 | 62 | KOR: 91,868 | Midnight Sun |
| "How to Love" | 2013 | 53 | 22 | KOR: 66,118 | Hard to Love, How to Love |
| "Be Alright" | 2013 | 82 | — | KOR:44,573 | Hard to Love, How to Love |
| "You're Bad" | 2013 | 88 | — | KOR: 27,361 | Hard to Love, How to Love |
| "Encore" | 2013 | 105 | — | KOR: 24,196 | Hard to Love, How to Love |
| "Intro" | 2013 | 173 | — | KOR:11,077 | Hard to Love, How to Love |
| "Tonight, I'll Be at Your Side" | 2014 | 16 | — | KOR:113,470 | Good Luck |
| "Sad Movie" (Korean version) | 2014 | 18 | — | KOR: 94,077 | Good Luck |
| "History" | 2014 | 23 | — | KOR: 71,959 | Good Luck |
| "Dance with U" | 2014 | 24 | — | KOR: 75,778 | Good Luck |
| "We Up" | 2014 | 25 | — | KOR:105,995 | Good Luck |
| "Drive" | 2014 | 15 | — | KOR:142,370 | Time |
| "Close My Eyes" | 2014 | 20 | — | KOR:124,749 | Time |
| "It's All Good" | 2014 | 22 | — | KOR:104,432 | Time |
| "Stay" | 2014 | 25 | — | KOR:90,438 | Time |
| "So Hot" | 2014 | 28 | — | KOR: 83,126 | Time |
| "See You There" | 2015 | 36 | — | KOR: 48,199 | Ordinary |
| "Suite Room" | 2015 | 38 | — | KOR: 47,997 | Ordinary |
| "Take It All" | 2015 | 44 | — | KOR: 44,786 | Ordinary |
| "Oh Honey" | 2015 | 48 | — | KOR: 43,670 | Ordinary |
| "When I" | 2016 | 47 | — | KOR: 44,480 | Highlight |
| "Highlight" | 2016 | 49 | — | KOR: 42,445 | Highlight |
| "Come Out"(Yoseob) | 2016 | 54 | — | KOR: 39,471 | Highlight |
| "Lullaby" | 2016 | 56 | — | KOR: 39,636 | Highlight |
| "Practice" | 2016 | 57 | — | KOR: 38,080 | Highlight |
| "Curious" | 2016 | 59 | — | KOR: 38,121 | Highlight |
| "Baby It's You" (Doojoon and Gi-kwang) | 2016 | 66 | — | KOR: 35,265 | Highlight |
| "Found You" (Junhyung) | 2016 | 72 | — | KOR: 33,125 | Highlight |
| "I'll Give You My All" (Dongwoon) | 2016 | 88 | — | KOR: 28,041 | Highlight |
| "Ribbon" (instrumental) | 2016 | 200 | — | KOR: 7,462 | Highlight |
| "The Beginning" | 2017 | 29 | — | KOR: 61,579 | Can You Feel It? |
| "Dangerous" | 2017 | 34 | — | KOR: 58,751 | Can You Feel It? |
| "Can You Feel It?" | 2017 | 39 | — | KOR: 41,452 | Can You Feel It? |
| "Spring Breeze" (봄바람) (with Lee Moon-sae) | 2017 | 72 | | | Fantastic Duo 2 Part 1 |
| "Sleep Tight" | 2017 | 35 | — | KOR: 68,602 | Calling You |
| "Celebrate" | 2017 | 42 | — | KOR: 39,859 | Celebrate |
| "Who Am I" | 2017 | 59 | — | KOR: 33,650 | Celebrate |
| "Take On Me" | 2017 | 67 | — | KOR: 31,332 | Celebrate |
| "Love Like This" | 2017 | 81 | — | KOR: 28,438 | Celebrate |
| "Paper Cut" | 2022 | 173 | — | | After Sunset |
| "S.I.L.Y (Say I Love You)" | 2022 | 183 | — | | After Sunset |
| "Privacy" | 2022 | 196 | — | | After Sunset |
"—" denotes releases that did not chart.

== Other releases ==
| Title | Year | Album |
|---|---|---|
| "Who's Next?" (with 4Minute) | 2010 | Hit Your Heart |
| "Skinny Baby" (with Apink) | 2011 | Non-album releases |
| "Fly So High" (with 4Minute and G.NA, as "U-Cube") | 2011 | Non-album releases |
| "Christmas Song" (크리스마스 노래) (with Cube Entertainment artists) | 2013 | Non-album releases |
| "Don't Get Sick" (Prod Lee Soo-geun) | 2021 | Knowing Brother's Children's Song Project |

== Soundtrack appearances ==
| Title | Year | Peak chart positions | Album |
| Title | Year | KOR Gaon | Album |
|---|---|---|---|
| "Crazy" | 2009 | — | Attack the Gas Station 2 OST |
| "Ready Go" | 2010 | — | Master of Study OST |
| "Loving U" | 2011 | 64 | All My Love For You OST |
| "Because of You" (너 때문인걸) | 2011 | 38 | My Princess OST |
| "Dreaming" (꿈을 꾼다) | 2011 | 39 | Me Too, Flower! OST |
| "Hateful Person" (미운사람) | 2012 | 9 | Big OST |
| "Black Paradise" | 2013 | 16 | Iris II: New Generation OST |
| "Bye Bye Love" (with BtoB) | 2013 | 35 | When a Man Falls in Love OST |
| "Without You" | 2015 | 62 | The Scholar Who Walks the Night OST |
"—" denotes releases that did not chart.

== Video albums ==
| Title | Video details | Peak chart positions | | Sales |
| Title | Video details | JPN DVD | KOR | Sales |
|---|---|---|---|---|
| Genesis of Beast | Released: March 2, 2011 (JPN); Label: Far Eastern Tribe; Format: DVD | 9 | 74 | KOR: 5,265 |
| The 1st Concert "Welcome to Beast Airline" | Released: January 18, 2012 (JPN); Label: SBS Contents Hub; Format: DVD | 3 | — | |
| The Special Selection of Beast Premium Edition | Released: February 29, 2012 (JPN); Label: Eun Soo Jung; Format: DVD | 12 | — | |
| Beast for U ～BeastからのMerry Christmas～ | Released: May 9, 2012 (JPN); Label: Hakuhodo DY Media Partners; Format: DVD | 11 | — | |
| Beast Complete History Box | Released: August 8, 2012 (JPN); Label: Universal Music; Format: DVD | 6 | — | |
| The 1st Beast Fan Meeting Asia Tour | Released: August 9, 2012 (KOR); Label: SBS Production; Format DVD | — | — | |
| Midnight Sun Special Edition DVD | Released: October 24, 2012 (JPN); Label: KTA; Format: DVD | 47 | — | |
| Beast Kanzen Micchaku Documentary 24 Hours (BEAST 完全密着ドキュメント24時) | Released: November 26, 2012 (JPN); Label: KlockWorx; Format: DVD | 18 | — | |
| The Beautiful Show In Seoul Live | Released: November 21, 2012 (JPN); Label: Far Eastern Tribe; Format: DVD | 27 | — | |
| Beast Beautiful Show Yokohama Concert | Released: January 30, 2013 (JPN); Label: TC Entertainment; Format: DVD | 22 | — | |
| My K-Star Beast (MBC Premium Highlight Clips) | Released: February 27, 2013 (JPN); Label: Far Eastern Tribe; Format: DVD | 31 | — | |
| Beast Zepp Tour 2012 | Released: August 28, 2013 (JPN); Label: KBS Media; Format: DVD | 17 | — | |
| Beast Clips 2009-2013 | Released: April 2, 2014 (JPN); Label: Universal Music; Format: DVD, Blu-ray | 31 | — | |
| Beast Japan Tour 2014 | Released: August 13, 2014 (JPN); Label: Universal Music; Format: DVD, Blu-ray | 25 | — | |
"—" denotes releases that did not chart.

== Music videos ==
| Year | Title | Length |
Korean
| 2009 | Bad Girl | 3:38 |
| 2010 | Shock | 4:19 |
| 2010 | Take Care Of My Girlfriend (Say No) | 3:20 |
| 2010 | Breath | 4:18 |
| 2010 | Beautiful | 7:15 |
| 2011 | Fiction | 5:06 |
| 2011 | I Like You The Best | 8:08 |
| 2011 | Skinny Baby (with Apink) | 3:30 |
| 2012 | Mystery | 2:16 |
| 2012 | Beautiful Night | 3:47 |
| 2012 | I Knew It | 1:48 |
| 2013 | 5! My Baby (with Apink) | 3:27 |
| 2013 | I'm Sorry | 5:11 |
| 2013 | Shadow | 3:44 |
| 2014 | No More | 4:04 |
| 2014 | Good Luck | 4:09 |
| 2014 | 12:30 | 4:07 |
| 2015 | Gotta Go To Work | 3:19 |
| 2015 | YeY | 3:46 |
| 2016 | Butterfly | 3:41 |
| 2016 | Ribbon | 4:31 |
| 2017 | It’s Still Beautiful | 3:50 |
| 2017 | Plz Don't Be Sad | 3:18 |
| 2017 | Calling You | 3:47 |
| 2017 | Can Be Better | 3:32 |
| 2018 | Loved | 3:52 |
| 2021 | Not The End | 3:43 |
Japanese
| 2011 | Shock | 4:10 |
| 2011 | Bad Girl | 3:14 |
| 2012 | Hoshi Wo Kazoeru Yoru | 3:52 |
| 2014 | Adrenaline | 3:49 |
| 2015 | Kimi Wa Dou? | 3:29 |
| 2015 | One | 3:01 |
| 2015 | Hands Up | 3:28 |
| 2015 | Can't Wait To Love You | 3:38 |
| 2015 | This Is My Life | 3:54 |
| 2015 | Throw Back Memories | 4:26 |
| 2015 | Yey | 3:47 |
| 2015 | Only One | 1:46 |
| 2015 | All Is In U | 3:28 |
| 2015 | Saigono Hitokoto | 3:58 |
| 2015 | Stay Forever Young | 3:20 |
| 2016 | Guess Who? | 3:05 |
| 2016 | Freaking Cute | 3:39 |
| 2016 | Whole Lotta Lovin | 3:46 |
