= List of awards and nominations received by Highlight =

Highlight awards and nominations
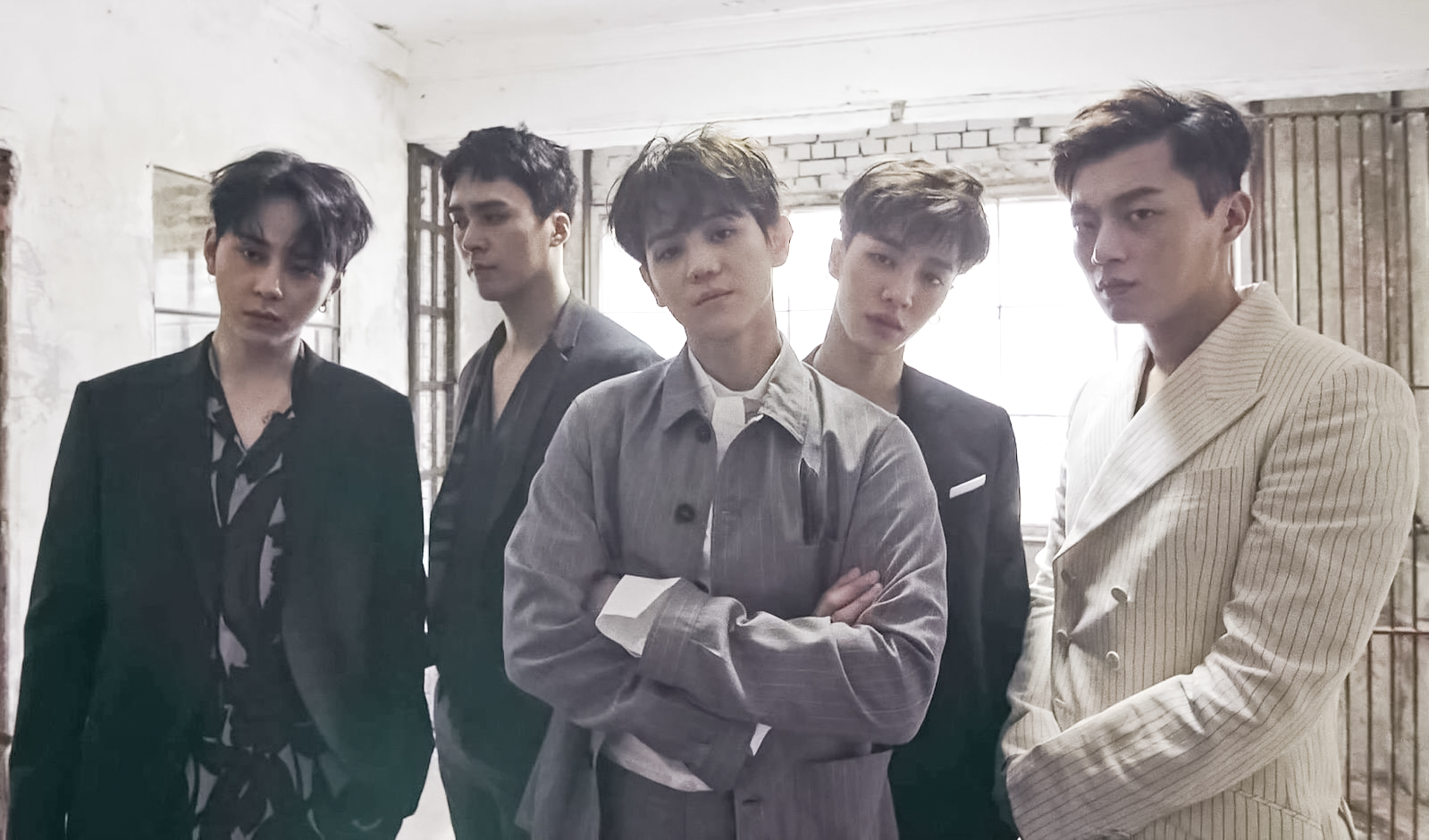
- Highlight in 2016
Awards and nominations
Award	Wins	Nominations
Asia Artist Awards	0	1
Gaon Chart Music Awards	1	8
Golden Disc Awards	12	14
Melon Music Awards	9	23
Mnet Asian Music Awards	1	15
Seoul Music Awards	6	10
Other awards	12	19

Totals (Note: Certain award groups do not simply award one winner. They acknowledge several different recipients, have runners-up, and have third place. Since this is a specific recognition and is different from losing an award, runner-up mentions are considered wins in this award tally. For simplification and to avoid errors, each award in this list has been presumed to have had a prior nomination.)
- Wins: 41
- Nominations: 90

This is the list of awards and nominations received by South Korean boy band Highlight, formerly known as Beast.

Their major accolades includes "Artist of the Year" awards at the 2011 and 2012 Melon Music Awards, "Song of the Year" award at the 2011 KBS Music Festival for "Fiction" from their 2011 album Fiction and Fact, as well as "Record of the Year" at the 2015 Seoul Music Awards for their 2014 album Time.

== Awards and nominations ==
The name of the award ceremony, year presented, category, nominee of the award, and the result of the nomination
Award ceremony	Year	Category	Nominee / work	Result	Ref.
Asia Artist Awards	2021	Male Idol Group Popularity Award	Highlight	Nominated	
Asia Model Awards	2012	Popular Male Group	Beast	Won	
Asia Song Festival	2010	Asia Influential Artist	Beast	Won	
Cyworld Digital Music Awards	2009	Rookie of the Month – December	"Mystery"	Won	
Gaon Chart Music Awards	2011	Album of the Year – 2nd Quarter	Fiction and Fact	Won	
Gaon Chart Music Awards	2012	Album of the Year	Midnight Sun	Nominated	
Gaon Chart Music Awards	2013	Popularity Award	Beast	Nominated	
Gaon Chart Music Awards	2014	Album of the Year	Good Luck	Nominated	
Gaon Chart Music Awards	2014	Popularity Award	Beast	Nominated	
Gaon Chart Music Awards	2016	Song of the Year – July	"Ribbon"	Nominated	
Gaon Chart Music Awards	2017	Album of the Year – 1st Quarter	Can You Feel It?	Nominated	
Gaon Chart Music Awards	2017	Song of the Year – March	"Plz Don't Be Sad"	Nominated	
Golden Disc Awards	2010	Rookie Award	"Shock"	Won	
Golden Disc Awards	2012	Album Bonsang	Fiction and Fact	Won	
Golden Disc Awards	2012	CeCi K-pop Icon Award	Beast	Won	
Golden Disc Awards	2012	MSN International Award	Beast	Won	
Golden Disc Awards	2013	Album Bonsang	Midnight Sun	Won	
Golden Disc Awards	2013	JTBC Best Artist Award	Midnight Sun	Won	
Golden Disc Awards	2014	Album Bonsang	Hard to Love, How to Love	Won	
Golden Disc Awards	2014	Popularity Award	Hard to Love, How to Love	Won	
Golden Disc Awards	2015	Digital Bonsang	"Good Luck"	Won	
Golden Disc Awards	2015	Popularity Award	"Good Luck"	Won	
Golden Disc Awards	2015	Best Male Performance	"12:30"	Won	
Golden Disc Awards	2016	Album Bonsang	Ordinary	Won	
Golden Disc Awards	2018	Digital Daesang	"Plz Don't Be Sad"	Nominated	
Golden Disc Awards	2018	Popularity Award	Highlight	Nominated	
Japan Gold Disc Award	2012	Best 3 New Artist (Asia)	Beast	Won	
KBS Entertainment Awards	2025	Digital Content Award (Note: Shared with the whole cast.)	Idol 1N2D	Won	
KBS Song Festival	2011	Song of the Year (Daesang)	"Fiction"	Won	
Korea Visual Arts Festival	2010	Photogenic Award	Beast	Won	
Melon Music Awards	2011	Artist of the Year (Daesang)	Beast	Won	
Melon Music Awards	2011	Top 10 (Bonsang)	Beast	Won	
Melon Music Awards	2011	Album of the Year (Daesang)	Fiction and Fact	Nominated	
Melon Music Awards	2011	Song of the Year (Daesang)	"On Rainy Days"	Nominated	
Melon Music Awards	2012	Artist of the Year (Daesang)	Beast	Won	
Melon Music Awards	2012	Top 10 (Bonsang)	Beast	Won	
Melon Music Awards	2012	Netizen Choice Award	Beast	Won	
Melon Music Awards	2012	Global Artist Award	Beast	Nominated	
Melon Music Awards	2013	Top 10 (Bonsang)	Beast	Won	
Melon Music Awards	2013	Netizen Choice Award	Beast	Nominated	
Melon Music Awards	2013	Artist of the Year (Daesang)	Beast	Nominated	
Melon Music Awards	2013	Best Music Video	"Shadow"	Won	
Melon Music Awards	2013	Song of the Year (Daesang)	"Shadow"	Nominated	
Melon Music Awards	2014	Top 10 (Bonsang)	Beast	Won	
Melon Music Awards	2014	Netizen Popularity Award	Beast	Won	
Melon Music Awards	2014	Artist of the Year (Daesang)	Beast	Nominated	
Melon Music Awards	2015	Top 10 (Bonsang)	Beast	Nominated	
Melon Music Awards	2015	Netizen Choice Award	Beast	Nominated	
Melon Music Awards	2016	Top 10 (Bonsang)	Beast	Nominated	
Melon Music Awards	2016	Netizen Choice Award	Beast	Nominated	
Melon Music Awards	2017	Top 10 (Bonsang)	Highlight	Nominated	
Melon Music Awards	2017	Netizen Popularity Award	Highlight	Nominated	
Melon Music Awards	2017	Best Dance Track Award	"Plz Don’t Be Sad"	Nominated	
Mnet Asian Music Awards	2009	Best New Male Artist	"Bad Girl"	Nominated	
Mnet Asian Music Awards	2010	Best Male Group	"Shock"	Nominated	
Mnet Asian Music Awards	2010	Best Male Dance Performance	"Shock"	Nominated	
Mnet Asian Music Awards	2011	Best Male Dance Performance	"Fiction"	Won	
Mnet Asian Music Awards	2011	Artist of the Year (Daesang)	Beast	Nominated	
Mnet Asian Music Awards	2011	Song of the Year (Daesang)	"Fiction"	Nominated	
Mnet Asian Music Awards	2011	Best Male Group	"Fiction"	Nominated	
Mnet Asian Music Awards	2012	Best Male Dance Performance	"Beautiful Night"	Nominated	
Mnet Asian Music Awards	2012	Best Male Group	"Beautiful Night"	Nominated	
Mnet Asian Music Awards	2012	Best Global Male Group	"Beautiful Night"	Nominated	
Mnet Asian Music Awards	2013	Best Male Dance Performance	"Shadow"	Nominated	
Mnet Asian Music Awards	2014	Album of the Year (Daesang)	Good Luck	Nominated	
Mnet Asian Music Awards	2014	Best Male Group	"Good Luck"	Nominated	
Mnet Asian Music Awards	2016	Best Group Vocal Performance	"Ribbon"	Nominated	
Mnet Asian Music Awards	2017	Best Group Vocal Performance	"Calling You"	Nominated	
Mnet Asian Music Awards	2025	Best Group Vocal Performance	"Endless Ending"	Nominated	
Mnet 20's Choice Awards	2010	Cool Star Award	Beast	Won	
Mnet 20's Choice Awards	2011	Hot Performance Star	Beast	Won	
MTV Europe Music Awards	2014	Best Korean Act	Beast	Nominated	
MTV Europe Music Awards	2017	Best Korean Act	Highlight	Nominated	
Myx Music Awards	2011	Favorite K-pop Video	"Beautiful"	Nominated	
Nickelodeon Korea Kids' Choice Awards	2012	Favorite Male Singer	Beast	Won	
SBS Gayo Daejeon	2014	Top Ten Artist	Beast	Won	
Seoul Music Awards	2010	Best New Artist	Beast	Won	
Seoul Music Awards	2010	Bonsang Award	Beast	Won	
Seoul Music Awards	2011	Bonsang Award	Beast	Won	
Seoul Music Awards	2013	Bonsang Award	Beast	Won	
Seoul Music Awards	2014	Record of the Year	Time	Won	
Seoul Music Awards	2014	Bonsang Award	Beast	Won	
Seoul Music Awards	2015	Bonsang Award	Beast	Nominated	
Seoul Music Awards	2017	Bonsang Award	Highlight	Nominated	
Seoul Music Awards	2017	Popularity Award	Highlight	Nominated	
Seoul Music Awards	2017	Hallyu Special Award	Highlight	Nominated	
Singapore Entertainment Awards	2012	Most Popular Korean Artist	Beast	Nominated	
Singapore Entertainment Awards	2013	Most Popular Korean Artist	Beast	Nominated	
Singapore Entertainment Awards	2013	Most Popular K-pop Music Video	"Beautiful Night"	Nominated	
Weibo Night	2015	Asia Popularity Award	Beast	Won	

== Other accolades ==
=== State honors ===
Name of country or organization, year given, and name of honor
Country or organization	Year	Honor	Ref.
Ministry of Culture, Sports and Tourism	2009	Rookie of the Month – December	
South Korea (Note: Honors are given at the Korean Popular Culture and Arts Awards, arranged by the Korea Creative Content Agency and hosted by the Ministry of Culture, Sports and Tourism. They are awarded to those who have contributed to the arts and South Korea's pop culture.)	2011	Minister of Culture, Sports and Tourism Commendation	

=== Listicles ===
Name of publisher, year listed, name of listicle, and placement
Publisher	Year	Listicle	Placement	Ref.
Forbes	2011	Korea Power Celebrity	40th	
Forbes	2012	Korea Power Celebrity	9th	
Forbes	2013	Korea Power Celebrity	29th	
Forbes	2015	Korea Power Celebrity	20th	
