= 29th Golden Disc Awards =

2015 South Korean music awards ceremony

- Date: January 14–15, 2015
- Location: MasterCard Center, Beijing
- Country: China
- Hosted by: Kim Sung-joo; Kim Jong-kook; Fei; Jun Hyun-moo; Leeteuk; Tiffany

Television/radio coverage
- Network: JTBC, iQiyi

The 29th Golden Disc Awards ceremony was held on January 14–15, 2015, at the MasterCard Center in Beijing, China. It was the third time the event had been hosted outside South Korea, following ceremonies in Japan in 2012 and Malaysia in 2013. Kim Sung-joo, Kim Jong-kook and Fei served as hosts on the first day, with Jun Hyun-moo, Leeteuk and Tiffany on the second.

== Winners and nominees ==
=== Main awards ===
Winners and nominees are listed in alphabetical order. Winners are listed first and emphasized in bold.

Digital Daesang (Song of the Year)	Disc Daesang (Album of the Year)
**Taeyang – "Eyes, Nose, Lips"**; Ailee – "Don't Touch Me"; AOA – "Miniskirt"; Beast – "Good Luck"; Epik High – "Happen Ending"; Girl's Day – "Something"; Hyuna – "Red"; K.Will – "Day 1"; Sistar – "Touch My Body"; Soyou & Junggigo – "Some"	**Exo – Overdose**; Apink – Pink Blossom; B1A4 – Who Am I; BTS – Dark & Wild; CNBLUE – Can't Stop; Girls' Generation – Mr.Mr; Girls' Generation-TTS – Holler; Infinite – Season 2; Super Junior – Mamacita; Taemin – Ace; VIXX – Eternity
Digital Song Bonsang	Album Bonsang
**Ailee – "Don't Touch Me"**; **AOA – "Miniskirt"**; **Beast – "Good Luck"**; **Epik High – "Happen Ending"**; **Girl's Day – "Something"**; **Hyuna – "Red"**; **K.Will – "Day 1"**; **Sistar – "Touch My Body"**; **Soyou & Junggigo – "Some"**; **Taeyang – "Eyes, Nose, Lips"**; 2NE1 – "Come Back Home"; AKMU – "200%"; Apink – "Mr. Chu"; Block B – "H.E.R"; CNBLUE – "Can't Stop"; Exo – "Overdose"; Gary – "Your Scent" (feat. Jungin); Girls' Generation – "Mr.Mr."; g.o.d – "The Lone Duckling"; High4 – "Not Spring, Love, or Cherry Blossoms" (feat. IU); IU – "My Old Story"; Kim Dong-ryul – "How I Am"; Park Bo-ram – "Beautiful"; Park Hyo-shin – "Wild Flower"; Red Velvet – "Happiness"; San E – "A Midsummer Night's Sweetness" (feat. Raina); Seo Taiji – "Sogyeokdong"; Winner – "Empty"	**Apink – Pink Blossom**; **B1A4 – Who Am I**; **BTS – Dark & Wild**; **CNBLUE – Can't Stop**; **Exo – Overdose**; **Girls' Generation – Mr.Mr**; **Girls' Generation-TTS – Holler**; **Infinite – Season 2**; **Super Junior – Mamacita**; **Taemin – Ace**; **VIXX – Eternity**; 2NE1 – Crush; 2PM – Go Crazy; AKMU – Play; B.A.P – First Sensibility; Block B – H.E.R; Beast – Good Luck; Epik High – Shoebox; f(x) – Red Light; g.o.d – Chapter 8; Got7 – Got Love; Seo Taiji – Quiet Night; Taeyang – Rise; Teen Top – Éxito; Toheart – 1st Mini Album; Winner – 2014 S/S
Rookie Artist of the Year	Popularity Award
**Got7**; **Red Velvet**; **Winner**; AKMU; Bernard Park; Eddy Kim; High4; Park Bo-ram	**Beast (digital)**; **Girls' Generation (digital)**; **Taemin (album)**; **Toheart (album)**

=== Special awards ===
Award	Winner
Best Trot Award	Hong Jin-young
Best Hip-Hop Award	Epik High
Best Male Performance	Beast
Best Female Performance	Apink
Next Generation Award (Digital)	Tasty
Next Generation Award (Album)	Bestie
Ceci Asia Icon Award	CNBLUE
China Goodwill Star Award (Digital)	Got7
China Goodwill Star Award (Album)	CNBLUE
iQiyi Popularity Award	CNBLUE
Trend of the Year	Soyou & Junggigo

== Controversy ==
Due to visa issues, several artists were unable to perform onstage during the ceremony, including members of Beast, Got7 and BTS. The organisers apologised for the error afterwards. The show also drew criticism for not being broadcast live in South Korea, with only a recorded version available on JTBC; the sole livestream was hosted on Chinese video platform iQiyi.
