= Midnight (Beast song) =

2012 single by Beast

Promotional single by Beast

from the album Midnight Sun
- Released: July 15, 2012
- Recorded: 2012
- Genre: K-pop; dance-pop
- Length: 3:54
- Label: Cube Entertainment
- Songwriters: Yong Jun-hyung; Choi Kyu-sung; Shinsadong Tiger
- Producers: Choi Kyu-sung; Shinsadong Tiger

"Midnight" (Korean: 별 헤는 밤; RR: Byeol Heneun Bam; Japanese: 星を数える夜; Hepburn: Hoshi o Kazoeru Yoru) is a song by the South Korean boy band Beast. It was released digitally in South Korea on July 15, 2012 as a pre-release single of the group's fifth mini album Midnight Sun, released a week after. The song was later re-recorded in Japanese and was used as the group's third Japanese single, released on October 17, 2012.

== Background ==
On July 12, Cube Entertainment announced that the song would be released on July 15 as a pre-release single from the upcoming mini album Midnight Sun. On July 15, "Midnight" was released digitally on South Korea music portal sites. On the same day, a theme music video of the song was also released. Although the group used the same system that they used on the album Fiction and Fact, releasing a song as a pre-single one week before its official release, the song was not promoted.

== Composition ==
"Midnight" was written by Yong Jun-hyung, Choi Kyu-sung, and Shinsadong Tiger; Kyu-sung and Tiger were the song's composers.

== Music video ==
The song does not have an official music video, instead Cube Entertainment released a one-minute and sixteen second theme music video. It was released, along with the digital release of the song, on July 15, 2012. The theme music video features scenes that the group shot in New York City between July 1 and July 7, 2012. Those scenes were also part of the music video for the lead single from Midnight Sun, the song "Beautiful Night".

== Track listing ==
Korean digital single:

1. "Midnight" (별 헤는 밤; Byeol Heneun Bam, The Night I Count the Stars) - 3:54

== Chart performance ==
The song debuted at number two on Gaon's weekly singles chart with 43,855,691 points. The song also charted on Gaon's other charts: on the Streaming chart the song peaked at number 5, with 2,214,129 streams in the first week; on the Download chart it peaked at number two with 473,121 downloads in the first week; on the BGM chart it peaked number one; on the Mobile chart it debuted at number ten and peaked at number nine; and in the Karaoke chart it peaked at number eighty-six. The song had better peaks on the charts than Midnight Sun's official lead single, "Beautiful Night". This is not the first time that the pre-single charted better than the lead single, it also happened with the singles "On Rainy Days" and "Fiction" from the group's first studio album Fiction and Fact.

=== Charts ===
Chart	Peak position
South Korea Gaon Weekly singles chart	2
South Korea Gaon Weekly Domestic singles chart	2
South Korea Gaon Monthly singles chart	11
South Korea Gaon Weekly Streaming chart	5
South Korea Gaon Weekly Download chart	2
South Korea Billboard Korea K-Pop Hot 100	6

== Japanese version ==
"Midnight -Hoshi wo Kazoeru Yoru- "
- Regular edition cover

Single by Beast
- B-side: "Amega Furu Nichi ni wa"
- Released: October 17, 2012
- Recorded: 2012
- Genre: J-pop; dance-pop
- Length: 3:54
- Label: Far Eastern Tribe
- Songwriters: Yong Jun-hyung; Choi Kyu-sung; Shinsadong Tiger

Beast Japanese singles chronology
"Bad Girl" (2011)	"Midnight -Hoshi wo Kazoeru Yoru- " (2012)

Two weeks after announcing the Japanese release of the EP Midnight Sun, on September 23, Far Eastern Tribe Records, the group's Japanese label, announced that a Japanese re-recorded version of the song "Midnight" would be used as the group's third Japanese single.

=== Background ===
The single was released on October 17, 2012 in ten different editions: 3 limited CD+DVD, a regular edition, and six special solo covers editions. All CD+DVD editions came with different features, Type A came with the live special "2011.06.22 Beast Night" Vol. 1 and Vol. 3; Type B came with the Vol. 2 and Vol. 4; and Type C came with the music video of "Midnight" and its 'making-of' video. The regular edition came with the CD single itself. A special solo cover version came with only "Midnight" on the single and with six different jacket covers of every member on them. The CD+DVD and regular editions also included a special random trading card, CD+DVD Type A included a card of Doo-joon or Dong-woon, CD+DVD Type B included a card of Gi-kwang or Jun-hyung, CD+DVD Type C included a card of Yo-seob or Hyun-seung, and the Regular edition a collective card of the members, 1 random from 3 different types. The b-side of the single, a Japanese version of "Biga Oneun Naren", was released the same way as "Midnight" in South Korea, one week after the album's release.

=== Composition ===
The Japanese version of the song is a re-recorded version of the Korean version with Japanese lyrics. The b-side is a Japanese version of the song "Biga Oneun Naren", which like "Midnight", was originally recorded in Korean and re-recorded with Japanese lyrics. The original version of the song was written and composed by Choi Kyu-sung. Both songs were translated into Japanese by Rina Moon.

=== Music video ===
The official music video for the Japanese version of the song premiered on September 27, exclusively on MTV Japan. Cube Entertainment uploaded the video on Beast's YouTube account on September 29.

=== Track listing ===
Special solo jacket covers only:

1. "Midnight -Hoshi wo Kazoeru Yoru-" (星を数える夜; At Night I Count the Stars) (Japanese version) - 3:54

Limited CD+DVD A, B and C and Regular edition:
No.	Title	Lyrics	Music	Length
1.	"Midnight -Hoshi wo Kazoeru Yoru-" (星を数える夜; At Night I Count the Stars) (Japanese version)	Yong Jun-hyung, Choi Kyu-sung, Shinsadong Tiger (Original), Rina Moon (Japanese translator)	Choi Kyu-sung, Shinsadong Tiger	3:54
2.	"Amega Furu Nichi ni wa" (雨が降る日には; On Rainy Days) (Japanese version)	Choi Kyu-sung (Original), Rina Moon (Japanese translator)	Yong Jun-hyung, Choi Kyu-sung	3:43
3.	"Midnight -Hoshi wo Kazoeru Yoru-" (Instrumental)		Choi Kyu-sung, Shinsadong Tiger	3:54
4.	"Amega Furu Nichi ni wa" (Instrumental)		Yong Jun-hyung, Choi Kyu-sung	3:43
Total length:				15:10

DVD (Limited CD+DVD Type A):
No.	Title	Length
1.	"Special" (2011.06.22 BEAST NIGHT Vol. 1)
2.	"Shock" (Japanese version) (2011.06.22 BEAST NIGHT Vol. 1)
3.	"Fiction" (2011.06.22 BEAST NIGHT Vol. 1)
4.	"Bad Girl" (Japanese version) (2011.06.22 BEAST NIGHT Vol. 1)
5.	"Shock" (Japanese version) (2011.06.23 BEAST NIGHT Vol. 3)
6.	"Fiction" (2011.06.23 BEAST NIGHT Vol. 3)
7.	"Biga Oneun Naren" (2011.06.23 BEAST NIGHT Vol. 3)
8.	"Bad Girl" (Japanese version) (2011.06.23 BEAST NIGHT Vol. 3)

DVD (Limited CD+DVD Type B):
No.	Title	Length
1.	"Special" (2011.06.22 BEAST NIGHT Vol. 2)
2.	"Biga Oneun Naren" (2011.06.22 BEAST NIGHT Vol. 2)
3.	"Beautiful" (2011.06.22 BEAST NIGHT Vol. 2)
4.	"Bad Girl" (Japanese version) (2011.06.22 BEAST NIGHT Vol. 2)
5.	"Fiction" (2011.06.23 BEAST NIGHT Vol. 4)
6.	"Shock" (2011.06.23 BEAST NIGHT Vol. 4)
7.	"Easy" (2011.06.23 BEAST NIGHT Vol. 4)
8.	"Bad Girl" (Japanese version) (2011.06.23 BEAST NIGHT Vol. 4)

DVD (Limited CD+DVD Type C):
No.	Title	Length
1.	"Midnight -Hoshi wo Kazoeru Yoru-" (Music video)
2.	"Midnight -Hoshi wo Kazoeru Yoru-" (Music video - Making-of)

=== Chart performance ===
==== Oricon chart ====
Released	Oricon Chart	Peak	Debut Sales	Sales Total	Chart Run
October 17, 2012	Daily Singles Chart	4	13,003	26,042+	4 weeks
October 17, 2012	Weekly Singles Chart	6	20,761	26,042+	4 weeks
October 17, 2012	Monthly Singles Chart	21	25,409	26,042+	4 weeks
October 17, 2012	Yearly Singles Chart			26,042+	4 weeks

== Release history ==
Country	Date	Format	Label
South Korea	July 15, 2012	Digital download	Cube Entertainment
Japan	October 7, 2012	Ringtone	Far Eastern Tribe Records
Japan	October 17, 2012	Digital download, CD single	Far Eastern Tribe Records
