= List of awards and nominations received by Taemin =

Taemin awards and nominations
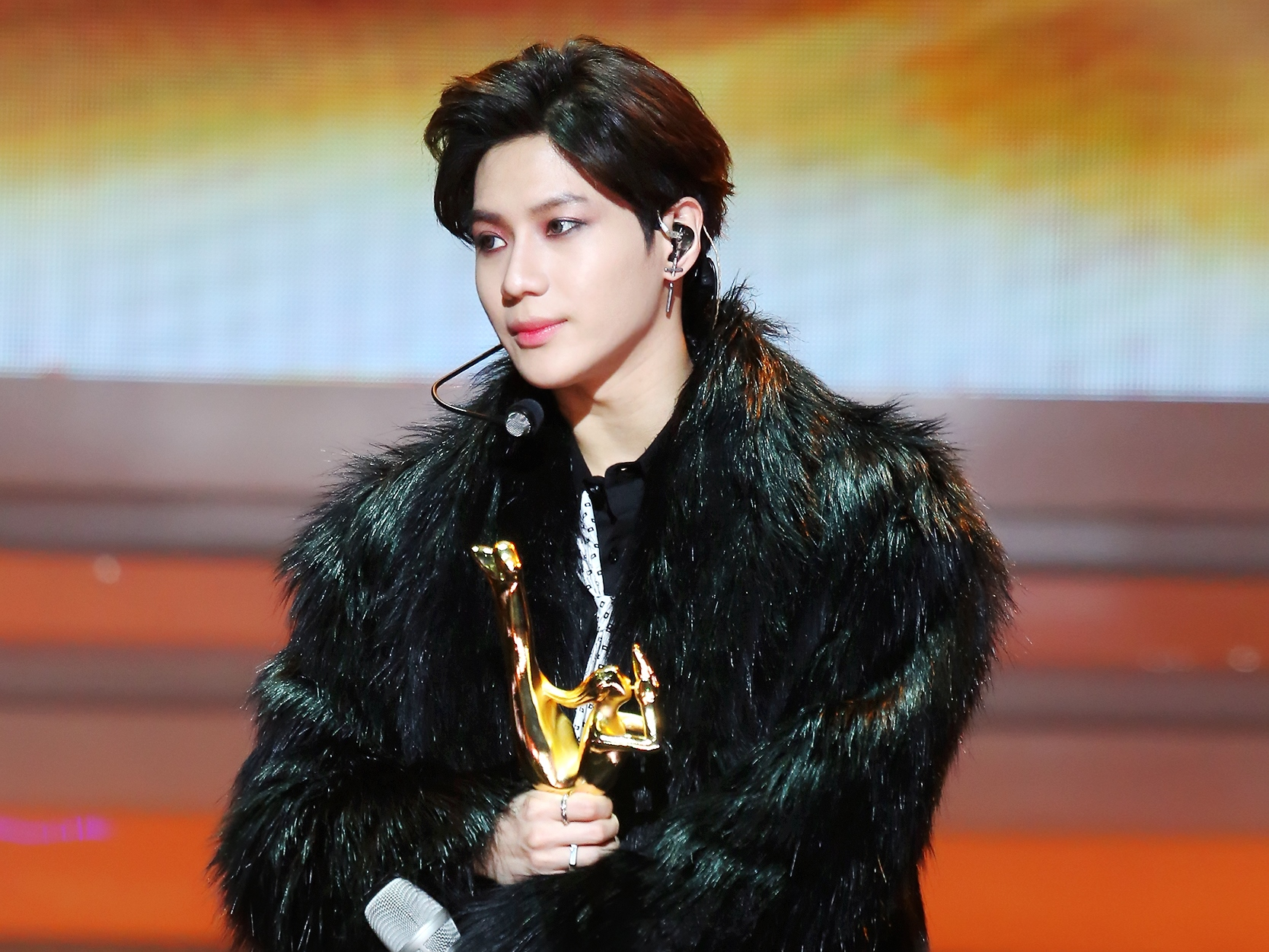
- Taemin at the 29th Golden Disc Awards in 2015
Awards and nominations
Award	Wins	Nominations
Arena Awards	1	1
Asia Artist Awards	0	1
Asia Star Entertainer Awards	2	2
Asian Culture Awards	1	1
Asian Pop Music Awards	0	1
Brand Customer Loyalty Awards	0	1
Brand of the Year Awards	0	1
Busan One Asia Festival	1	1
Gaon Chart Music Awards	0	2
Golden Disc Awards	3	8
Korea Grand Music Awards	3	3
Korean Music Awards	0	1
MBC Entertainment Awards	1	2
Mnet Asian Music Awards	3	18
Seoul Music Awards	2	7
Soompi Awards	1	1
Supersound Festival	1	1

Totals (Note: Certain award groups do not simply award one winner. They acknowledge several different recipients, have runners-up, and have third place. Since this is a specific recognition and is different from losing an award, runner-up mentions are considered wins in this award tally. For simplification and to avoid errors, each award in this list has been presumed to have had a prior nomination.)
- Wins: 19
- Nominations: 54

This is a list of awards and nominations received by South Korean singer Taemin, member of South Korean boy band Shinee.

== Awards and nominations ==
Name of the award ceremony, year presented, category, nominee(s) of the award, and the result of the nomination
Award ceremony	Year	Category	Nominee / work	Result	Ref.
Arena Awards	2020	Best Solo Artist Award	Taemin	Won	
Asia Artist Awards	2026	Popularity Award – Solo (Male)	Taemin	Pending	
Asia Star Entertainer Awards	2024	The Best Performance (Solo)	Taemin	Won	
Asia Star Entertainer Awards	2024	The Best Conceptual Artist (Solo)	Taemin	Won	
Asian Culture Awards	2020	Best K-pop Solo Artist	Taemin	Won	
Asian Pop Music Awards	2023	Best Male Artist (Overseas)	Taemin	Nominated	
Brand Customer Loyalty Awards	2021	Best Male Solo Artist	Taemin	Nominated	
Brand of the Year Awards	2021	Male Solo Singer of the Year	Taemin	Nominated	
Busan One Asia Festival	2017	Performance Star Award	Taemin	Won	
Gaon Chart Music Awards	2015	Artist of the Year (Album)	Ace	Nominated	
Gaon Chart Music Awards	2017	Album of the Year – 1st Quarter	Press It	Nominated	
Golden Disc Awards	2015	Disc Bonsang	Ace	Won	
Golden Disc Awards	2015	Disc Daesang	Ace	Nominated	
Golden Disc Awards	2015	Popularity Award	Taemin	Won	
Golden Disc Awards	2017	Disc Bonsang	Press It	Won	
Golden Disc Awards	2017	Disc Daesang	Press It	Nominated	
Golden Disc Awards	2018	Disc Bonsang	Move	Nominated	
Golden Disc Awards	2018	Global Popular Artist	Taemin	Nominated	
Golden Disc Awards	2021	Disc Bonsang	Never Gonna Dance Again: Act 1	Nominated	
Hanteo Music Awards	2024	Artist of the Year	Taemin	Nominated	
Korea Grand Music Awards	2024	Best Artist	Taemin	Won	
Korea Grand Music Awards	2024	Best Solo Artist	Taemin	Won	
Korea Grand Music Awards	2024	Best Popularity Artist	Taemin	Won	
Korean Music Awards	2018	Best Pop Album	Move	Nominated	
MAMA Awards	2016	Song of the Year	"Press Your Number"	Nominated	
MAMA Awards	2016	Best Dance Performance – Solo	"Press Your Number"	Won	
MAMA Awards	2017	Best Dance Performance – Solo	"Move"	Won	
MAMA Awards	2017	Song of the Year	"Move"	Nominated	
MAMA Awards	2019	Best Dance Performance – Solo	"Want"	Nominated	
MAMA Awards	2019	Best Male Artist	Taemin	Nominated	
MAMA Awards	2020	Best Male Artist	Taemin	Nominated	
MAMA Awards	2020	Artist of the Year	Taemin	Nominated	
MAMA Awards	2020	Worldwide Icon of the Year	Taemin	Nominated	
MAMA Awards	2020	Song of the Year	"Criminal"	Nominated	
MAMA Awards	2020	Best Dance Performance – Solo	"Criminal"	Nominated	
MAMA Awards	2020	Favorite Dance Performance – Male Solo	"Criminal"	Won	
MAMA Awards	2024	Artist of the Year	Taemin	Nominated	
MAMA Awards	2024	Song of the Year	"Guilty"	Nominated	
MAMA Awards	2024	Best Dance Performance – Male Solo	"Guilty"	Nominated	
MAMA Awards	2024	Best Choreography	"Guilty"	Nominated	
MAMA Awards	2024	Best Male Artist	Taemin	Nominated	
MAMA Awards	2024	Fans' Choice Male	Taemin	Nominated	
MBC Entertainment Awards	2013	Star of the Year	We Got Married	Won	
MBC Entertainment Awards	2013	Best Couple Award (with Son Na-eun)	We Got Married	Nominated	
Seoul Music Awards	2015	Bonsang Award	Ace	Nominated	
Seoul Music Awards	2015	Popularity Award	Taemin	Won	
Seoul Music Awards	2015	Hallyu Special Award	Taemin	Nominated	
Seoul Music Awards	2018	Popularity Award	Taemin	Won	
Seoul Music Awards	2021	Bonsang Award	Never Gonna Dance Again: Act 1	Nominated	
Seoul Music Awards	2021	Popularity Award	Taemin	Nominated	
Seoul Music Awards	2021	Hallyu Popular Award	Taemin	Nominated	
Soompi Awards	2017	Best Male Solo	Taemin	Won	
Supersound Festival	2023	Best Male Solo Performer of the Year	Taemin	Won	

== Other accolades ==
=== Honors ===
Name of organization, year given, and name of honor
Organization	Year	Honor	Ref.
National Tax Service of South Korea	2021	Exemplary Taxpayer Commendation	

== See also ==
- List of awards and nominations received by Shinee
