= Time (Beast EP) =

EP by Beast
- Released: October 20, 2014
- Genres: K-pop; R&B; ballad
- Length: 20:47
- Language: Korean
- Labels: Cube Entertainment; Universal Music Group

Beast chronology
Good Luck (2014)	Time (2014)	Ordinary (2015)

Singles from Time
- 1. "12:30 (12시 30분)" Released: October 20, 2014

Time is the eighth extended play by South Korean boy group Beast. It was released on October 20, 2014, as a special EP to commemorate the 5th anniversary of the group's debut. This marks the first time the group has released two albums in one year, since 2010 with Shock of the New Era and Mastermind. According to Gaon Chart, as of the end of December 2014, the album has sold a cumulative total of 69,004 copies. Its major accolades includes Record of the Year award at the 2015 Seoul Music Awards.

== Background and album ==
The album was first announced at the 2014 Beautiful Show concert in August, making this the group's second release within 12 months, following their previous album Good Luck released four months earlier.

The album consists of six tracks with lead track titled "12:30" being a ballad track, that describes the different emotions experienced when a couple breaks up. "Yong said he used solid rhythm, piano sounds and as dubstep, creating a song with a lot of beats and rhythm", further adding that he chose it as the lead track because "it's the hour that makes me sentimental". Member Yang Yo-seob added that the track is accompanied with a "dynamic choreography, which will show that people can move and dance to ballads".

Member Lee Gi-kwang also contributed to the album, composing "So Hot" with Yong Jun-hyung and Noday; and writing the lyrics with Noday.

== Track listing ==
All lyrics are written by Good Life (Yong Jun-hyung, Kim Tae-joo); all music is composed by Good Life.

No.	Title	Lyrics	Music	Arrangement	Length
1.	"12:30" (12시 30분; Yeoldulsi Samsipbun)	Good Life	Good Life	Good Life	3:53
2.	"Drive"	Good Life	Good Life	Good Life	3:11
3.	"It's All Good" (좋은 일이야; Joheun Iriya)	Good Life	Good Life	Good Life	3:39
4.	"Close My Eyes" (눈을 감아도; Nuneul Gamado)	Good Life	Good Life	Good Life	3:26
5.	"Stay" (가까이; Gakkai)	Good Life	Good Life	Good Life	3:25
6.	"So Hot"	Lee Gi-kwang, Noday, Yong Jun-hyung	Lee Gi-kwang, Noday	Philip	3:09
Total length:					20:47

== Charts ==
Chart	Peak position	Sales
Gaon Weekly album chart	1	KOR: 69,004+
Gaon Monthly albums chart	2	KOR: 69,004+
Gaon Yearly album chart	30	KOR: 69,004+
