= So Beast =

- CD Only cover

Studio album by Beast
- Released: August 10, 2011
- Recorded: 2010–2011
- Genre: K-pop
- Length: 44:11
- Language: Japanese / Korean
- Label: Far Eastern Tribe

Beast chronology
Fiction and Fact (2011)	So Beast (2011)	Midnight Sun (2012)

Singles from So Beast
- 1. "Shock" Released: March 16, 2011; 2. "Bad Girl" Released: June 15, 2011

So Beast is the first Japanese album from the South Korean boy group Beast. It was released in Japan on August 10, 2011 in 3 formats: A CD+DVD A coming with a DVD, 72-page photobook, 22-page lyric booklet and comes in a digipak with a sleeve over it, CD+DVD B comes with a DVD with different contents and a 32-page photobook and CD only just featuring a lyric booklet and its CD. It contains 12 tracks, some tracks in Korean and some tracks are Japanese versions from their previously released albums. It ranked no. 3 in Oricon's Weekly albums chart with 50,819 copies sold in the first week.

== Composition ==
The album includes Japanese versions of songs which were previously released in Korean. Most notably, "Fiction" and "Fiction (Orchestra Version)" from their first full album "Fiction and Fact", "Mystery" on the EP "Beast Is the B2ST" and also their first two Japanese singles "Shock" and "Bad Girl". It also includes a few Korean songs.

== Singles ==
The first single from the album (and also their debut in Japan) is a Japanese version of the song "Shock". It was released on March 16, 2011, and ranked no. 2 in Oricon's Weekly chart. It sold more than 56,000 copies.

The second single from the album is a Japanese version of the song "Bad Girl", which is also their debut single in South Korea. It was released on June 15, 2011, and ranked no. 3 in Oricon's Weekly chart. At that date, it sold more than 50,000 copies.

== Track listing ==
Album track list
No.	Title	Lyrics	Length
1.	"Fiction" (Japanese version)	Shin Sa-dong Tiger, Choi Kyu-Sung, Yong Jun-hyung, Rina Moon (Japanese lyrics)	3:56
2.	"Bad Girl" (Japanese version)	Shin Sa-dong Tiger, Lee Sang-Ho, BEAST, Rina Moon (Japanese lyrics)	3:14
3.	"Shock" (Japanese version)	Shin Sa-dong Tiger, Lee Sang-Ho, Rina Moon (Japanese lyrics)	3:48
4.	"Mystery" (Japanese version)	Shin Sa-dong Tiger, Lee Sang-Ho, Kang Ji-Won, Rina Moon (Japanese lyrics)	3:31
5.	"Soom" (숨; Breath)	Shin Sa-dong Tiger, Choi Kyu-Sung, Rado, Yong Jun-hyung	3:34
6.	"Beautiful"	Shin Sa-dong Tiger, Lee Sang-Ho, Kim Do-Hoon	3:38
7.	"On Rainy Days" (비가 오는 날엔; Biga Oneun Naren)	Choi Kyu-Sung, Yong Jun-hyung	3:47
8.	"V.I.U (Very Important U)"	Super Chanddai	3:09
9.	"Virus"	Lee Gil-Bum, Jwa Haeng-Suk, Yong Jun-hyung	3:25
10.	"You"	Choi Kyu-Sung, Rado, Yong Jun-hyung	3:51
11.	"Fiction" (Orchestra Version) (Japanese version)	Shin Sa-dong Tiger, Choi Kyu-Sung, Yong Jun-hyung, Rina Moon (Japanese lyrics)	4:16
12.	"Rainbow" (무지개 – Mujigae) (Bonus Track)	Lee Kyung-Nam, Kim Yi-Jin (Korean lyrics), Masaharu Fukuyama	4:07
Total length:			44:11

DVD - Type A (1st Showcase In Japan 2010.11.27 - The Legend of BEAST Vol.1 ~2010 Yajuu Densetsu no Makuake~)
No.	Title	Length
1.	"Shock"
2.	"Mystery"
3.	"Clenching a Tight Fist" (주먹을 꽉 쥐고 – Jumeogeul Kkwak Jwigo)
4.	"Bad Girl"
5.	"Soom"
6.	"Easy"
7.	"Special"
8.	"Oasis"
9.	"Beautiful"
10.	"Documentary"

DVD - Type B
No.	Title	Length
1.	"Shock" (Japanese version) (Music video)
2.	"Bad Girl" ((Japanese version) (Music video))
3.	"2011.5.13-15 HI-TOUCH Event Document"
4.	"Soom" (Dance Practice video)
5.	"Shock" (Dance Practice video)
6.	"The Fact / Fiction" (Dance Practice video)

- The song "Rainbow" is a Korean remake of the song "Niji" by Masaharu Fukuyama.

== Charts ==
=== Weekly charts ===
Chart (2011)	Peak position
Japanese Albums (Oricon)	3
South Korean Albums (Gaon)	28
South Korean International Albums (Gaon)	5

=== Year-end charts ===
Chart (2011)	Position
Japanese Albums (Oricon)	87
South Korean International Albums (Gaon)	36

Chart (2012)	Position
South Korean International Albums (Gaon)	90

== Release history ==
Country	Date	Format	Label
Japan	August 10, 2011	Digital download, CD	Far Eastern Tribe Records
South Korea	October 24, 2011	Digital download, CD	Cube Entertainment
