= Shock (Beast song) =

2010 song by Beast

Single by Beast

from the album Shock of the New Era
- Released: February 28, 2010
- Recorded: 2010
- Genre: Dance-pop, electropop, hip hop
- Length: 3:47
- Label: Cube Entertainment
- Songwriters: Ho Yang-lee, Sang Ho-lee & Yong Jun-hyng

Beast Korean singles chronology
"Mystery" (2009)	"Shock" (2010)	"Take Care of My Girlfriend (Say No)" (2010)

Music video
- "Shock" (Korean) on YouTube

"Shock (Japanese Version)"
- Limited Edition A Cover

Single by Beast

from the album So Beast
- Released: March 16, 2011 (Japan)
- Recorded: 2011
- Genre: J-pop, electropop, dance-pop
- Length: 3:47
- Label: Far Eastern Tribe Records

Beast Japanese singles chronology
"Shock (Japanese Version)" (2011)	"Bad Girl" (2011)

Music video
- "Shock" (Japanese) on YouTube

"Shock" is a song by the South Korean boy group Beast. It's the first single from their second EP "Shock of the New Era" which was released on March 1, 2010 along with the EP. The song introduced a new genre called Rocktronic, which is a combination of rock and electronic music.

A Japanese version was released on March 16, 2011 which serves as their debut single in Japan. It ranked #2 in the Oricon daily and weekly chart with 28,532 copies sold in the first week, beating the debut single of Big Bang's "My Heaven" at no. 3 in 2009.

== Background ==
In February 2010, Cube Entertainment announced that Beast will be returning into the music scene with a powerful chic black-toned concept, deviating from the image they portrayed from their debut single. "Shock" was originally set for release on March 2, 2010 together with the EP, but was moved back a day earlier because it was leaked on YouTube. Despite the leak, the song was able to enter the Top 10 Chart on different music portals.

=== Japanese debut ===
"Shock (Japanese version)" is the official title of Beast's Japanese debut single. The song is sung in Japanese except for the rap portion which still remains in Korean. The single was released on March 16, 2011 and debuted at number 2 on the Oricon weekly singles chart.

The single was released in four different versions (Limited Edition A, B, C, and Regular Edition). The B-sides of each version vary from each other, all of which came from their different Korean EP's and are all sung in Korean. The accompanied songs are "Muni Dathimyeon" (문이 닫히면, lit. When The Door Closes), "Thanks To", "Let It Snow" and "Lights Go On Again (Full version)" which comes from their Korean digital album My Story, "Break Down" from Mastermind, and "Lightless" and "Niga Jeir Joha" (니가 제일 좋아, lit. I Like You the Best) from Lights Go On Again.

== Composition ==
"Shock" (Korean. Ver) (2010)
"Their title song "Shock" introduced a new genre called Rocktronic which is a combination of rock and electronic music."

"Shock" is composed by Shin Sa-dong Tiger and Lee Sang-ho with the rap portion written by Beast member, Yong Jun Hyung. The song has a loop that sounds like you're listening to the guitar leap of heavy metal, and although it is brief, it harmonizes well with the heavy and fun rhythm of idol music. In addition with the strong beat, dynamic mood, and in reverse, with its sad sensitive lyrics, you can feel the lyrical emotions once you've listened to the song.

== Promotion ==
- For their Korean promotions see Shock Of The New Era

Due to the 2011 Tōhoku earthquake and tsunami disaster in Japan, all scheduled promotions for their single were cancelled. However, on May 13, 2011, they had an event commemorating the release of the "Shock" single. They visited Tokyo and had a High Touch Event with approximately 8000 people in order to give back to the fans who had bought their album back in March. On May 15, 2011, they went to Osaka and greeted about 6000 fans with a high five event.

== Music video ==
=== Korean version ===
The music video for "Shock" was taken in the midst of their "Mystery" promotions towards the end of February 2010. It was filmed secretly at Kyungeedo Studio. The music video was again directed by the same Zanybros' Hong Won-ki, well known for directing 4Minute Hyuna's "Change", and 2AM's "Can't Let You Go" music videos as well as the co-producer and co-director of Seo Taiji's ₩800,000,000 music video "Moai". The full music video was released on March 1, 2010.

The music video starts with a few shots of audio and film recording equipment, which then quickly changes to a scene with Yang Yo Seob lying on a white table where he's slowly wrapped by live cables as the song finally starts. The whole scene then shifts into a dark storehouse-like room with the members of Beast sporting a powerful chic black-toned concept, dancing to the song's main choreography. Throughout the music video, the scenes changes alternatively from the group dancing together in the dark room to individual shots, either sitting on a large white lego chair or standing behind a fire. At the end of the music video, a lady is shown sitting on the white lego chair, touching a customized headphone. A caption saying "Coming up next from Cube" is shown as the lady gazes through the camera and the scene slowly fades away. A representative from Cube Entertainment revealed that the girl is on the same age as 4Minute's Sohyun and is currently preparing for her debut at the time of filming.

=== Japanese version ===
The music video for the Japanese version was released on February 27, 2011 on Beast official YouTube account. It was originally planned to be released on February 26, 2011, for 10 minutes, starting at 5:30PM, in 5 major cities in Japan such as Tokyo and Shibuya through giant billboards. However, the Shibuya police department instructed for the playing to be cancelled because they were concerned that too many fans would crowd around to watch it.

The content of the music video is much like the Korean one, but with a few minor changes. The music video now starts with Yang Yo Seob standing in front of a large air vent and singing to the first line of the song, then quickly changes into a scene with him lying on a white table where live cables started wrapping around him similarly to the Korean version as he sings the second line. The scene later moves on into a dark storehouse-like room, similar to the Korean version, but with a much brighter lighting. Throughout the music video, the scenes still changes alternatively from the members dancing and singing together in the room to individual shots. This time, the white lego chair seen in the Korean version during their individual shots is replaced by a red leather chair. At the end of the video, just like in the Korean version, a mysterious lady is shown sitting on the red leather chair with a caption saying "Coming up next from Cube". Later it was revealed the girl in the music video was A Pink's Chorong.

== Track listing ==
Japanese Single:

Limited Edition A (CD + T-Shirt)
No.	Title	Length
1.	"Shock [ショック; Syokku]" (Japanese Version)	3:47
2.	"Muni Dathimyeon" (문이 닫히면, lit. When The Door Closes) (Doo Joon & Dong Woon)	3:26
3.	"Thanks To" (Jun Hyung & Yo Seob)	3:55
4.	"Let It Snow" (Gi Kwang & Hyun Seung)	4:13
Total length:		15:16

Limited Edition B (CD + DVD)
No.	Title	Length
1.	"Shock [ショック; Syokku]" (Japanese Version)	3:47
2.	"Break Down"	3:37
3.	"Shock" (Instrumental)	3:46
Total length:		11:09

DVD (Limited Edition B)
No.	Title	Length
1.	"Shock" (Japanese Version) (Music Video)
2.	"Shock" (Japanese Version) (Music Video - Making of)

Limited Edition C (CD + DVD)
No.	Title	Length
1.	"Shock [ショック; Syokku]" (Japanese Version)	3:47
2.	"Lightless"	3:26
3.	"Shock" (Instrumental)	3:46
Total length:		10:57

DVD (Limited Edition C)
No.	Title	Length
1.	"SHOCK (Korean Version)" (Live from 1st showcase in Japan 2010.11.27 THE LEGEND OF BEAST VOL.1 ~2010 Yajuu Densetsu no Makuake~)

Regular Edition
No.	Title	Length
1.	"Shock [ショック; Syokku]" (Japanese Version)	3:47
2.	"Niga Jeil Joha" (니가 제일 좋아, lit. I Like You the Best)	3:24
3.	"Lights Go On Again" (Full Version)	3:35
4.	"Shock" (Instrumental)	3:46
Total length:		14:29

== Chart performance ==
In Japan, the single ranked #2 in the Oricon daily and weekly chart with 28,532 copies sold in the first week, which became as the highest ranking debut single by a non-Japanese artist in Japan since BigBang's "My Heaven" at no. 3 in 2009. In the long run it managed to have good sales, but Beast were unable to promote due to the 2011 Tōhoku earthquake and tsunami.

== Charts ==
=== Korean version ===
Weekly charts

Chart (2010)	Peak position
South Korea (Gaon)	3

Year-end charts

Chart (2010)	Position
South Korea (Gaon)	55

=== Japanese version ===
Weekly charts

Chart (2011)	Peak position
Japan (Oricon)	2
Japan Hot 100 (Billboard)	5
South Korea International Albums (Gaon)	1
South Korea International Digital (Gaon)	16

Year-end charts

Chart (2011)	Position
South Korea International Albums (Gaon)	34

== Release history ==
Country	Date	Format	Label
Japan	March 16, 2011	Digital download, CD single	Far Eastern Tribe Records
South Korea	February 28, 2010 (Korean version)	Digital download	Cube Entertainment
South Korea	July 19, 2011 (Japanese version)	Digital download, CD single	Cube Entertainment
