= Hard to Love, How to Love =

Studio album by Beast
- Released: July 19, 2013; October 30, 2013 (Japanese edition)
- Recorded: 2013
- Genre: K-pop, dance-pop, electropop, hip hop
- Length: 27:11
- Label: Cube Entertainment; Universal Music Korea (Korean edition); Universal Music Japan (Japanese edition); Far Eastern Tribe (Japanese edition)
- Producer: Yong Jun-hyung, Kim Tae-joo

Beast chronology
Midnight Sun (2012)	Hard to Love, How to Love (2013)	Good Luck (2014)

Singles from Hard to Love, How to Love
- 1. "Will You Be Alright? (괜찮겠니)" Released: May 29, 2013; 2. "I'm Sorry" Released: June 15, 2013; 3. "Shadow (그림자)" Released: July 19, 2013

Hard to Love, How to Love is the second studio album (third overall) by South Korean boy band Beast. It was released on July 19, 2013 with the song "Shadow (Geurimja)" as promotional single. The entire album was produced by the member Yong Jun-hyung, along with Kim Tae-joo. Two songs from the album, "Will You Be Alright?" and "I'm Sorry", were released as digital singles as a preview for it.

== Background ==
On May 27, 2013, the CEO of Cube Entertainment, Hong Seung-seong, revealed some details about Beast's upcoming album release: ″It's now time for me to show you the three big pictures we′ve drawn regarding Beast's comeback. Thanks to the Beast members and their efforts to put together a puzzle that will make everyone supporting them happy, Beast has confirmed a comeback date in July.″ The CEO also said, ″Beast's upcoming album, to be released in July, will be performed for the first time onstage at B2ST's exclusive concert to be held in the same month. Their music, which shines more brilliantly onstage, will kick off with a concert so that B2UTYs will be the ones to see it first. Many passionate debates, designs and fun ideas have been thrown out regarding the comeback and are still going on, so make sure you don't let go of your anticipation.″

On July 11, via Cube Entertainment's Twitter account, the label revealed the album's name, titled Hard to Love, How to Love, and the release date, July 19. A day later, on July 12, the label announced the promotional track of the album, titled "Shadow" (그림자 Geurimja), and a promotional photo. On July 15, the label posted on their Twitter and Facebook accounts solo teaser photos from each member of the group, starting with Doo-joon and finishing with Dong-woon. It was also revealed the album's track list, composed by eight tracks.

== Release ==
On May 29, 2013, a digital single, "Will You Be Okay?" (Korean: 괜찮겠니; RR: Gwaenchankenni?) was released, and a special video of the song was uploaded to Beast's official YouTube account. The song went to number 1 on the Gaon Digital Chart and the Billboard K-pop Hot 100. A second song, "I'm Sorry", was released digitally on June 15 and also placed on both charts. Both songs were included on the upcoming album.

Hard to Love, How to Love was released in Korea on July 19, 2013. It reached number 1 on South Korea's Gaon physical sales chart, Beast's first song to do so, and number 6 on the Billboard World Albums chart. A Japanese edition of the album was released in Japan on October 30, 2013, and peaked at number 18 on the Oricon Albums Chart. It contained the same material as the Korean edition but also included a Japanese-language version of "Shadow".

The Korean music video for "Shadow" was released on the group's official YouTube account on July 19, 2013. The song reached number 2 on the Gaon Digital Chart and number 3 on the Billboard K-pop Hot 100.

== Critical reception ==
Jeff Benjamin of Billboard described Hard to Love, How to Love ultimately as balanced. He praised the impressive vocals on "Will You Be Okay?" and the range of notes sounded on "I'm Sorry". He calls "Shadow" the album's centerpiece, with its "aggressive, piano-laden electro-pop beat" and elements reminiscent of their earlier song, "Fiction" from 2011's Fiction and Fact.

== Composition ==
The album is composed by eight tracks, four new songs, an intro, an outro and two already-released singles. All songs from the album were written and produced by Kim Tae-joo and Beast member Yong Jun-hyung. The album's cover art was created by Kim Do-ho.

== Track listing ==
All tracks are written by Yong Jun-hyung and Kim Tae-joo.

No.	Title	Length
1.	"Intro"	1:28
2.	"Shadow" (그림자; Geurimja)	3:37
3.	"How to Love"	3:59
4.	"Be Alright"	3:57
5.	"I'm Sorry" (아임 쏘리; Aim Ssori)	3:49
6.	"Will You Be Alright?" (괜찮겠니; Gwaenchangetni)	3:42
7.	"You're Bad" (너는 나빠; Neoneun Nappa)	3:23
8.	"Encore"	3:22

Japan Edition (CD)
No.	Title	Length
9.	"Shadow (シャドウ)" (Japanese Ver.)	3:27

Japan Edition (DVD)
No.	Title	Length
1.	"Shadow" (Music Video)
2.	"Shadow" (Music Video -Special Ver.-)

== Personnel ==
- Hong Seung-seong - executive producer
- Shin Jeong-hwa - executive producer
- Park Choong-min - executive supervisor
- No Hyeon-tae - executive director
- Yong Jun-hyung - music producer
- Kim Tae-joo - music producer
- Im Sang-hyeok - production director
- Seo Jae-woo - music supervisor
- Jeong Ra-young - A&R
- Shin Jae-bin - recording engineer, mixing engineer (Cube Studio)
- Jeong Bu-yeon - recording engineer (Cube Studio)
- Jo-ssi ajeossi - mixing engineer (Cube Studio)
- Go Seung-wook - mixing engineer (Bono Studio)
- Choi Hyo-young - mastering engineer (Suono Mastering Studio)

== Charts ==
=== Weekly charts ===
Chart (2013)	Peak position
Japanese Albums (Oricon)	18
South Korean Albums (Gaon)	1
US World Albums (Billboard)	6

=== Year-end charts ===
Chart (2013)	Position
South Korean Albums (Gaon)	22

== Release history ==
Country	Date	Format	Label
South Korea	July 19, 2013	Digital download	Cube Entertainment; Universal Music Group
South Korea	July 22, 2013	CD	Cube Entertainment; Universal Music Group
Japan	October 30, 2013	Japan Edition (CD+DVD)	Universal Music Japan; Far Eastern Tribe
Japan	October 30, 2013	Japan Edition (CD only)	Universal Music Japan; Far Eastern Tribe
