= Midnight Sun (Beast EP) =

EP by Beast
- Released: July 22, 2012
- Recorded: 2012
- Genre: K-pop, dance-pop, R&B
- Length: 21:44
- Language: Korean
- Label: Cube Entertainment, Universal Music Group

Beast chronology
So Beast (2011)	Midnight Sun (2012)	Hard to Love, How to Love (2013)

Singles from Midnight Sun
- 1. "I Knew It" Released: January 26, 2012; 2. "Beautiful Night" Released: July 22, 2012

Midnight Sun is the fifth EP and the sixth overall by South Korean boy band Beast. It was released on July 22, 2012, with "Beautiful Night" as the promotional track. "Midnight" was released one week before the EP's release, on July 15, 2012.

== Background ==
On May 16, 2012, Beast's South Korean comeback was hinted at in tweets to the B2UTYs (Beast fan club) by Cube Entertainment CEO Hong Seong-sung. According to Hong, "All you B2UTYs, we are planning on making the greatest comeback ever known".

On July 3, Beast was seen in a week-long music-video shoot in New York City (from July 1 until July 7). It was the group's first music video filmed outside South Korea. Beast announced their comeback in South Korea on July 11 on Google+, saying that their new EP would be released on July 22. That day, a photo of the EP's title and release date was posted on the band's Korean website. The following day (July 12), Cube Entertainment announced that "Midnight" would be released on July 15. On July 13, photos were posted on Cube Entertainment's Facebook page. The following day, a preview of the music video for "Beautiful Night" was released. On July 15, "Midnight" and its video were released digitally on South Korea music sites. Two days later, Cube Entertainment introduced "Beautiful Night" and posted two photos of Doo-joon, Jun-hyung and Dong-woon. On July 18, two more photos of Hyun-seung, Yo-seob and Gi-kwang were posted. The following day, the EP's track list and composers were announced. On July 20, a preview of the music video for "Beautiful Night" was released on Beast's YouTube channel. Two days later, the EP and the "Beautiful Night" video were released.

== Composition ==
Most of the EP's six songs were written by Yong Jun-hyung; "Beautiful Night" was written by 4realz, Goodnite and Sleepwell, the first time Beast did not use a song produced by Shinsadong Tiger as its lead single. "Midnight" was written by Yong Jun-hyung, Choi Kyu-sung and Shinsadong Tiger, and "Not Me" was written by Rado and Jun-hyung. "When I Miss You" was written by Jun-hyung and Choi Kyu-sung, and "The Day You Rest" and "Dream Girl" were written by Jun-hyung and Kim Tae-joo. A Japanese version of "Midnight" (Japanese: 星を数える夜-) was scheduled for release as the group's third Japanese single.

== Release ==
A limited edition of the EP was released on August 8, 2012 with the CD, an 84-page photo booklet, a wallet card, 12 photo cards, a 3D card, a golden card with serial code and a mobile-phone cleaner. A Japanese edition was released on September 26 in two editions, with "I Knew It" (released as a digital single in South Korea) included on the track list; one edition had a DVD with the EP's music videos.

== Promotions ==
Beast performed "Beautiful Night" on July 27, 2012 on KBS's Music Bank. The song was also promoted on Music Core, Inkigayo and M! Countdown. "Not Me" was used for the comeback-week performances. On Inkigayo, the group used their performance of "Beautiful Night" in the guerilla concert at Gwanghwamun Square.

== Track listing ==
No.	Title	Lyrics	Music	Arrangement	Length
1.	"Midnight" (별 헤는 밤; Byeol Heneun Bam, The Night I Count the Stars)	Yong Jun-hyung, Choi Kyu-sung, Shinsadong Tiger	Choi Kyu-sung, Shinsadong Tiger	Shinsadong Tiger	3:54
2.	"Beautiful Night" (아름다운 밤이야; Areumdaun Bamiya)	4realz	Goodnite, Sleepwell	Goodnite, Sleepwell	3:39
3.	"Not Me" (내가 아니야; Nega Aniya)	Rado, Yong Jun-hyung	Rado	Rado	3:28
4.	"When I Miss You" (니가 보고 싶어지면; Niga Bogo Sipeojimyeon)	Yong Jun-hyung, Choi Kyu-sung	Choi Kyu-sung	Choi Kyu-sung	3:36
5.	"The Day You Rest" (니가 쉬는 날; Niga Swineun Nal)	Yong Jun-hyung, Kim Tae-joo	Yong Jun-hyung, Kim Tae-joo	Yong Jun-hyung, Kim Tae-joo	3:20
6.	"Dream Girl"	Yong Jun-hyung, Kim Tae-joo	Yong Jun-hyung, Kim Tae-joo	Yong Jun-hyung, Kim Tae-joo	3:50
Total length:					21:44

Japan Edition
No.	Title	Lyrics	Music	Arrangement	Length
7.	"I Knew It" (이럴 줄 알았어; Ireol Jul Arasseo)	Yong Jun-hyung, Rado	Rado	Rado	3:35
Total length:					25:19

Japan Edition - DVD
No.	Title	Length
1.	"Beautiful Night" (Music video)
2.	"Midnight" (Theme music video)
3.	"I Knew It" (Theme music video)

== Chart performance ==
=== Album chart ===
Chart	Peak position
Gaon Weekly album chart	1
Gaon Weekly domestic album chart	1
Gaon Monthly album chart	2
Gaon Monthly domestic album chart	2

=== Singles chart ===
Song	Peak chart position	
Song	KOR	KOR
Song	Gaon Chart	K-Pop Billboard
"Midnight"	2	6
"Beautiful Night"	3	4
"I Knew It"	1	3

=== Other songs charted ===
Song	Peak chart position	
Song	KOR	KOR
Song	Gaon Chart	K-Pop Billboard
"Not Me"	34	42
"When I Miss You"	32	22
"The Day You Rest"	67	62
"Dream Girl"	65	52

=== Sales and certifications ===
Chart	Amount
Gaon physical sales	146,696

== Release history ==
Country	Date	Format	Label
South Korea	July 22, 2012	Digital download, CD	Cube Entertainment; Universal Music Group
South Korea	August 8, 2012	CD (Limited edition)	Cube Entertainment; Universal Music Group
Taiwan	August 17, 2012	CD	Universal Music Taiwan
Philippines	November 2012	CD	MCA Music
Japan	September 26, 2012	CD (Regular and Limited edition)	Far Eastern Tribe Records
