= Bad Girl (Beast song) =

2009 debut single by South Korean boy group Beast

Single by Beast

from the album Beast Is the B2ST
- Released: October 14, 2009
- Recorded: 2009
- Genre: Dance-pop, electrohop
- Length: 3:14
- Label: Cube Entertainment
- Songwriters: Jang Hyun-seung, Lee Gi-kwang, Lee Sang-ho, Shinsadong Tiger, Son Dong-woon, Yang Yo-seob, Yong Jun-hyung & Yoon Doo-joon

Beast Korean singles chronology
"Bad Girl" (2009)	"Mystery" (2009)

Music video
- "Bad Girl" (Korean) on YouTube

"Bad Girl (Japanese Version)"
- Regular Edition cover

Single by Beast

from the album So Beast
- Released: June 15, 2011 (Japan)
- Recorded: 2011
- Genre: Dance-pop, electrohop, hip hop
- Length: 3:12
- Label: Far Eastern Tribe Records
- Songwriters: Jang Hyun-seung, Lee Gi-kwang, Lee Sang-ho, Shinsadong Tiger, Son Dong-woon, Yang Yo-seob, Yong Jun-hyung & Yoon Doo-joon

Beast Japanese singles chronology
"Shock" (2011)	"Bad Girl (Japanese Version)" (2011)	"Midnight -Hoshi wo Kazoeru Yoru-" (2012)

Music video
- "Bad Girl" (Japanese) on YouTube

"Bad Girl" is the debut single by South Korean boy group Beast, coming from their debut mini-album Beast Is the B2ST which was released in South Korea on October 14, 2009.

The group released a Japanese version of the song as their second single in Japan on June 15, 2011. The Japanese single came in 4 editions: 3 CD+DVD and a regular edition. On June 7, 2011, a week before the physical release, the song peaked at no. 1 in the mobile site Recochoku - Chaku Uta's daily ringtone chart. The single peaked at no. 2 in Oricon's Daily Chart with 21,449 copies sold on the first day and no. 3 in Oricon's Weekly Chart with 42,386 copies sold in the first week.

== Background ==
On May 19, 2011, while still in the midst of their Fiction and Fact promotions, Cube Entertainment announced that Beast will be releasing their second Japanese single on June 15, 2011 with a Japanese version of their debut song “Bad Girl”. The single was released in four editions: 3 limited CD + DVD edition (Type A comes with a 32-pages photobook, Type B and Type C) and a regular edition (comes with a trading card). Each edition of the single has a different B-side, all of which are remixes of their Korean songs aside from Easy (Sincere Version).

== Promotions ==
On June 14, 2011, Beast held a surprise event at Tokyo, Shinjuku Station Square where they performed “Bad Girl (Japanese version)” and their debut single “Shock (Japanese Version) in front of approximately 5,000 fans. The event was held in order to promote the release of their second single which was set for release on the following day, June 15, 2011. However, Beast leader Yoon Doo Joon was not present in the event due to conflicting schedules. The group also held a two-day mini-concert titled Beast Night on June 22, 2011 at Studio Coast in Tokyo as a celebration for the release of their single. They also announced during this event that they'll be releasing their first regular Japanese album in August which would include their first two releases.

== Music video ==
=== Japanese version ===
The Japanese version of the music video resembles the Korean version, the choreography is the same but it changes the studios (in total are 5 different studios) that are more clean and futuristic, the clothes are more fresh and clean and in the music video, the individual parts are in the same studio, different from the Korean version when every member has different studios. The music video was released in the YouTube official channel of the group on May 26, 2011. There was no dance break as with the Korean version.

=== Korean version ===
The music video was filmed in September 2009 and it premiered October 13, 2009.

The video begins with the members dancing in a black room, also it has blue lights (on the walls and ceiling), when it Kikwang's verse, the screen switches to the members where they dance in a white room, also there were solo scenes of the members, at 2:24 the song stops and the members do a dance break what were set in a brown night desert.

== Track listing ==
Japanese single:

Type A
No.	Title	Length
1.	"Bad Girl" (Japanese Version)	3:12
2.	"Mystery" (80KIDZ Remix)	4:25
3.	"Easy" (Sincere Version)	3:42
Total length:		11:20

DVD (Type A)
No.	Title	Length
1.	"BEAST to Isshoni Ippaku Futsuka" (BEASTと一緒に一泊二日)

Type B
No.	Title	Length
1.	"Bad Girl" (Japanese Version)	3:12
2.	"Bad Girl, 배드걸; Baedeu Geol" ((Korean Version) Genki Rockets Remix)	3:56
3.	"Bad Girl" (Instrumental)	3:11
Total length:		10:17

DVD (Type B)
No.	Title	Length
1.	"Bad Girl" (Japanese Version) (Music Video)
2.	"Bad Girl" (Japanese Version) (Music Video - Making of)

Type C
No.	Title	Length
1.	"Bad Girl" (Japanese Version)	3:12
2.	"Special" (FIREWORK DJs Remix)	3:55
3.	"Bad Girl" (Instrumental)	3:11
Total length:		10:16

DVD (Type C)
No.	Title	Length
1.	"Bad Girl, 배드걸; Baedeu Geol (Korean Version)" (Live from 1st showcase in Japan 2010.11.27 THE LEGEND OF BEAST VOL.1 ~2010 Yajuu Densetsu no Makuake~)

Regular Edition
No.	Title	Length
1.	"Bad Girl" (Japanese Version)	3:12
2.	"Bad Girl, 배드걸; Baedeu Geol" (Korean Version)	3:14
3.	"Shock, 쇼크; Syokeu" (Korean Version) (SONPUB Remix)	5:24
4.	"Bad Girl" (Instrumental)	3:11
Total length:		14:29

== Charts ==
=== Oricon ===
Oricon Chart	Peak	Debut sales	Sales total
Daily Singles Chart	2	42,386	58,000+
Weekly Singles Chart	3	42,386	58,000+
Monthly Singles Chart	14	42,386	58,000+
Yearly Singles Chart	138	42,386	58,000+

=== Other charts ===
Chart	Peak position
Billboard Japan Hot 100	10
RIAJ Digital Track	77

== Release history ==
Country	Date	Format	Label
South Korea	October 14, 2009	Digital download	Cube Entertainment
Japan	June 15, 2011	Digital download, CD single	Far Eastern Tribe Records
