= Lights Go On Again =

EP by Beast
- Released: November 9, 2010
- Recorded: 2010
- Genre: K-pop, dance-pop, R&B
- Length: 15:22
- Language: Korean
- Label: Cube Entertainment
- Producer: Hong Shin-seong

Beast chronology
Mastermind (2010)	Lights Go On Again (2010)	My Story (2010)

Singles from Lights Go On Again
- 1. "Beautiful" Released: November 9, 2010; 2. "I Like You the Best" Released: September 25, 2011

Lights Go On Again is the fourth mini-album played by South Korean boy band Beast. It is said that "Lights Go On Again" was a part 2 of their past album "Mastermind", with a whole set of different colors. "Lights Go On Again" was released by Cube Entertainment on November 9, 2010. The song "Beautiful" was chosen to be the title track of the EP.

== History ==
On November 3, 2010, Beast opened up the preorder sales for their 4th mini-album named Lights Go On Again. The album took the top 5 spots on the Mnet music charts on November 8, 2010, with their lead track, “Beautiful” debuting at 1st place, while the album’s remaining four tracks placed 2nd, 3rd, 4th, and 5th respectively. According to album sales site Hanteo, the group’s album sales showed great success, with their sales figures ranked first. On November 15, 2010, Beast released the first part of the relay music drama from the 4th mini-album on their official YouTube channel. It garnered interest from fans as well as overseas promoters and media for the style and concept of the upcoming music videos.

On November 5, 2010, Beast revealed a teaser of the title song ‘Beautiful’ from their new album ‘Lights go on again’ in a form of an audio teaser on the radio show of KBS COOL FM ‘Narsha’s Raise the Volume’

The ‘radio teaser’ method has been an effective strategy carried out by BEAST that received an explosive response from the fans with the release of the title song off the 3rd album, ‘Breath’. Anticipation rose from the fans as they heard the short clip of the song to get a feel for the whole song.

== Track listing ==
No.	Title	Lyrics	Music	Length
1.	"Lights Go on Again"	Hong Seungsung, DA9297, Shinsadong Tiger, Yong Junhyung	DA9297, Shinsadong Tiger	3:34
2.	"Beautiful"	Kim Dohoon, Shinsadong Tiger, Lee Sangho	Kim Dohoon, Shinsadong Tiger, Lee Sangho	3:36
3.	"니가 제일 좋아" (Niga Jeil Joha / I Like You the Best)	Shinsadong Tiger, Yong Junhyung	Shinsadong Tiger, Lee Chaekyu, Jeongoon	3:22
4.	"Lightless"	Rado, Shinsadong Tiger, Yong Junhyung, Choi Kyusung	Rado, Shinsadong Tiger, Choi Kyusung	3:24
5.	"I'm Sorry"	Rado, Yong Junhyung, Choi Kyusung	Rado, Choi Kyusung	3:14
Total length:				15:22

== Charts ==
=== Album chart ===
Chart	Peak position
Gaon album chart	1

=== Single chart ===
Song	Peak position
Song	Gaon Chart
"Beautiful"	6
"I Like You The Best"	55

== Release history ==
Country	Date	Format	Label
South Korea	November 9, 2010	Digital download, CD	Cube Entertainment
South Korea	March 17, 2011	CD+DVD Deluxe Special Asian Edition	Cube Entertainment
Asia	December 12, 2010	CD+DVD Deluxe Special Asian Edition	Cube Entertainment
