= Shock of the New Era =

EP by Beast
- Released: March 1, 2010
- Genres: K-pop, dance-pop, electrohop, R&B
- Length: 15:15
- Language: Korean
- Label: Cube Entertainment
- Producer: Hong Shin-seong

Beast chronology
Beast is the B2ST (2009)	Shock of the New Era (2010)	Mastermind (2010)

Singles from Shock of the New Era
- 1. "Shock" Released: February 28, 2010; 2. "Take Care of My Girlfriend (Say No)" Released: April 13, 2010

Shock of the New Era is the second EP played by South Korean boy band Beast, and was released by Cube Entertainment on March 1, 2010. The songs were written and composed by Shin Sa-dong Tiger and Lee Sang-ho who crafted Beast's previous singles like "Bad Girl" and "Mystery". "Shock", the lead single was released simultaneously with the EP.

The group's second mini-album, Shock Of The New Era have already sold over 20,000 copies to date. The new genre prepared by Beast for this mini-album is 'Rocktronic.' With a powerful sound and Beast's added color to Shock of the New Era, they sped up the overall completion of the album. Their title song "Shock" is being reviewed as serving a powerful voice while having a strong sound with an abundance of melting sensibility.

Beast ended promotions for their second mini-album on May 16, 2010 with their follow-up song "Special" on SBS's Inkigayo.

== History ==
On February 25, 2010, a teaser video with the message "Beast-Shock" was posted on Beast's official fancafe. A day later, three of the members, Yo Seob, Hyun Seung and Dong Woon's jacket photos were released. On February 27, the full video teaser was released, titled "Just Before Shock", which is also a shorter version of the first track on the mini-album. The remaining three members, Doo Joon, Jun Hyung, and Gi Kwang's jacket photos were released. The full music video was released on March 1.

The original release date was set to be March 2. However, the title song "Shock" was leaked out on YouTube, therefore pushing forward the release date to March 1. A Cube Entertainment representative stated, "We heard about the news of the leakout on Youtube, we are currently doing our best to track the source of leakout. Appropriate actions will be act accordingly on the one who is found to have leaked out the song."

== Promotions ==
Beast made their comeback on March 5, 2010 on KBS's music program, Music Bank. Beast received their very first #1 win on Mnet's M!Countdown with their song "Shock" on March 25, 2010 beating out 2AM's "I Was Wrong" by one point with a total of 918 points. The group has been performing their ballad track, "Easy", live on various radio shows. A representative stated that after the group wraps up with promotions for "Shock", the second single the group will be performing is a ballad track, which will showcase the members' vocals. With a surprise, the music video for "Nae Yeojacinguleul Butaghae (Say No)" was released on April 14.

On April 29, a new version of "Easy" titled "Easy (Sincere Version)" was released in digital format in order to help promote the group's second EP even more. The lyrics for this version was rearranged and included stringed instruments and the piano with a soft rap.

Beast ended their promotions for "Shock" and has started on promoting their second single from the album. Beast started performing the songs "Special" and the revised version of "Easy" on Mnet's M!Countdown on May 6.

=== "Shock" ===
The music video for "Shock" was taken in the midst of their "Mystery" promotions towards the end of February 2010. It was filmed secretly at Kyungeedo studio. The music video was again directed by the same Zanybros' Hong Won-ki, well known for directing 4Minutes's Hyuna's "Change", and 2AM's "Can't Let You Go" music videos as well as the co-producer and co-director of Seo Taiji's ₩800,000,000 music video "Moai". The full music video was released on March 1, 2010.

The music video starts with a few shots of audio and film recording equipment, which then quickly changes to a scene with Yang Yoseob lying on a white table where he’s slowly wrapped by live cables as the song finally starts. The whole scene then shifts into a dark storehouse-like room with the members of Beast sporting a powerful chic black-toned concept, dancing to the song's main choreography. Throughout the music video, the scenes changes alternatively from the group dancing together in the dark room to individual shots, either sitting on a large white lego chair or standing behind a fire. At the end of the music video, a lady is shown sitting on the white lego chair, touching a customized headphone. A caption saying "Coming up next from Cube" is shown as the lady gazes through the camera and the scene slowly fades away. A representative from Cube Entertainment revealed that the girl is on the same age as 4Minute's Sohyun and is currently preparing for her debut at the time of filming.

=== "Nae Yeojacinguleul Butaghae (Say No)" ===
"Nae Yeojacinguleul Butaghae (Say No)" is the official second single from their EP. The music video for "Nae Yeojacinguleul Butaghae (Say No)" was released on April 14 through Yang Yo Seob, Jang Hyun Seung, and Son Dong Woon's personal microblogs, yozm, with Yo Seob the first to upload the music video. A representative from Cube Entertainment said that this music video was a promise and gift for the fans. The members of Beast made the video themselves without the help of any staff members. The music video was in black and white and kept simple and focused on the members singing or rapping their part.

== Choreography ==
The dance for "Shock" was choreographed by Haw from South Korean hip hop dance crew, Prepix. The choreography contains a VTach dance with dynamic poses. Although the word VTach is a medical word meaning 'ventricular tachycardia', as a term used by the younger generation on the internet, the meaning has gradually changed to mean a praise to a star regarding their amazing visual or performance that gave a shock, stopping the heart. Their follow-up song "Special" was also choreographed by Haw from Prepix. The main points and concept of the choreography of this dance included the members of Beast motioning themselves like they were in front of a mirror and making expressions with their faces as stated on Haw's Cyworld.

== Deluxe Version ==
A Deluxe Version was released on April 9, 2010, which contains all ten tracks from the first and second mini-album. This version also contains a 40-page photo lyric book.

== Track listing ==
=== Original edition ===
No.	Title	Lyrics	Music	Length
1.	"Just Before Shock"	Shinsadong Tiger, Choi Kyu-seong, Yong Jun Hyung	Shinsadong Tiger	2:06
2.	"Shock" (쇼크; Syokeu)	Lee Sang-ho, Shinsadong Tiger, Yong Jun Hyung	Lee Sang-ho, Shinsadong Tiger	3:46
3.	"Special" (스페셜; Seupesyeol)	Lee Sang-ho, Shinsadong Tiger, Yong Jun Hyung	Lee Sang-ho, Shinsadong Tiger	3:18
4.	"내 여자친구를 부탁해 (Say No)" (Nae Yeojachinguleul Butaghae; lit. "Take Care of My Girlfriend")	"Hitman" Bang, Baek Chan (ko), Yong Jun Hyung	"Hitman" Bang, pdogg	3:14
5.	"Easy" (이지; Iji)	Kim Gi-bum (KGB), Kang Ji-won	Kim Gi-bum (KGB), Kang Ji-won	3:41
Total length:				15:25

=== Digital single ===
No.	Title	Lyrics	Music	Length
5.	"Easy (Sincere Version)"	Kim Gi-bum (KGB), Kang Ji-won	Kim Gi-bum (KGB), Kang Ji-won	3:33
Total length:				3:33

=== Deluxe Edition ===
No.	Title	Lyrics	Music	Length
1.	"Beast is the B2ST"			1:36
2.	"Bad Girl" (배드걸; Baedeu Geol)	Lee Sang-ho, Shin Sa-dong Tiger	Lee Sang-ho, Shin Sa-dong Tiger, Beast	3:16
3.	"Just Before Shock"	Shin Sa-dong Tiger, Choi Kyu-seong, Yong Jun Hyung	Shin Sa-dong Tiger	2:06
4.	"Shock" (쇼크; Syokeu)	Lee Sang-ho, Shin Sa-dong Tiger, Yong Jun Hyung	Lee Sang-ho, Shin Sa-dong Tiger	3:07
5.	"내 여자친구를 부탁해 (Say No)" (Nae Yeojacinguleul Butaghae)	"hitman" bang, Baek Chan, Yong Jun Hyung	"hitman" bang, pdogg	3:14
6.	"Special" (스페셜; Seupesyeol)	Lee Sang-ho, Shin Sa-dong Tiger, Yong Jun Hyung	Lee Sang-ho, Shin Sa-dong Tiger	3:21
7.	"아직은" ("Ajigeun")			3:42
8.	"Mystery" (미스테리; Miseuteri)	Lee Sang-ho, Kang Ji-won, Shin Sa-dong Tiger	Lee Sang-ho, Kang Ji-won	3:30
9.	"Easy" (이지; Iji)	Kim Gi-bum (KGB), Kang Ji-won	Kim Gi-bum (KGB), Kang Ji-won	3:41
10.	"Oasis" (오아시스; Oasiseu)			3:48
Total length:				31:07

== Personnel ==
- Im Sang-hyuk – music supervisor
- Kim Hyung-kyu – casting and training
- Park Jae-hyun – casting and training
- Song Jung-eun – casting and training
- Park Sang-mi – casting and training
- Kim Kyu-sang – casting and training
- Kim Young-deok – casting and training
- Yoo Jung-wan – casting and training
- Cho Sung-joon – mixing engineer
- pdogg – mixing engineer
- Shin Jae-bin – recording, assistant mixing engineer
- Choi Hyo-young – mastering
- Simon Davey – mastering
- Rado (라도) – chorus
- Beast – chorus
- Baek Chan – chorus
- Kim Gi-bum (KGB) – chorus

== Charts ==
=== Weekly charts ===
Chart (2010)	Peak position
South Korean Albums (Gaon)	2

=== Year-end charts ===
Chart (2010)	Position
South Korean Albums (Gaon)	19

Chart (2011)	Position
South Korean Albums (Gaon)	80

== Release history ==
Version	Country	Date	Format	Label
-	South Korea	February 28, 2010	digital download	Cube Entertainment
-	South Korea	March 1, 2010	CD	Cube Entertainment
Asian Version	Taiwan	April 9, 2010	CD	Universal Music Group (Taiwan)
