= My Story (EP) =

EP by Beast
- Released: December 21, 2010
- Genre: Pop, R&B
- Length: 15:08
- Language: Korean
- Label: Cube Entertainment, Universal Music Group
- Producer: Hong Shin-seong

Beast chronology
Lights Go On Again (2010)	My Story (2010)	Fiction and Fact (2011)

My Story is the first Digital EP and fifth overall extended play by South Korean boy band Beast.

== History ==
It includes three collaboration songs between BEAST members, plus a full version of their fourth mini-album intro track "Lights go on again". The collaboration tracks were released after BEAST held their first concert, WELCOME TO BEAST AIRLINE, and performed those live.

‘When the Door Closes’ which is a ballad track was released on December 21, 2010. On December 23, 2010, "Let It Snow" which is a pop and R&B track will be released.

== Track listing ==
No.	Title	Lyrics	Music	Length
1.	"문이 닫히면" (When The Door Closes)	Yoon Doo-joon, Son Dong-woon	Rado	3:26
2.	"Thanks To"	Yong Jun-hyung, Yang Yo-seob	Yong Jun-hyung, Yang Yo-seob, Shinsadong Tiger	3:54
3.	"Let It Snow"	Jang Hyun-seung, Lee Ki-kwang	Choi Kyu Sung	4:13
4.	"Lights Go On Again (Full Version)"	Hong Seungsung, DA9297, Shinsadong Tiger, Yong Jun-hyung	DA9297, Shinsadong Tiger	3:35
Total length:				15:08

== Release history ==
Country	Songs	Date	Format	Label
South Korea	문이 닫히면	December 21, 2010	digital download	Cube Entertainment; Universal Music Group
South Korea	Thanks To	December 22, 2010	digital download	Cube Entertainment; Universal Music Group
South Korea	Let It Snow	December 23, 2010	digital download	Cube Entertainment; Universal Music Group
South Korea	Lights Go On Again	December 24, 2010	digital download	Cube Entertainment; Universal Music Group
