= Beast Is the B2ST =

EP by Beast
- Released: October 14, 2009
- Recorded: 2009
- Genre: K-pop, dance-pop, R&B
- Length: 15:52
- Language: Korean
- Label: Cube Entertainment

Beast chronology
Beast Is the B2ST (2009)	Shock of the New Era (2010)

Singles from Beast Is the B2ST
- 1. "Bad Girl" Released: October 14, 2009; 2. "Mystery" Released: October 14, 2009

Beast Is the B2ST (Beast Is the Best) is the debut extended play by South Korean boy band Beast. It was released by Cube Entertainment on October 14, 2009 and contains five songs, including the singles "Bad Girl" and "Mystery". The album was a commercial success, selling over 40,000 copies.

== Background ==
In October 2009, Beast held their debut showcase at the MTV GongGae Hall and made their live performance debut on KBS Music Bank with their debut single, "Bad Girl". A documentary recording the story of the group's debut titled MTV B2ST was filmed during this time, showing the members as they filmed their first music video and bonded with each other. Their debut mini-album, Beast Is the B2ST featured five songs, including the intro track "Beast Is the B2ST", "Mystery", and "Oasis". The song "Yet" (아직은, Ajigeun) was banned from airplay due to (believed) swearing in JunHyung's rap. This is actually quite a controversial topic among fans, seeing as some believe the "swear word" could have been another word entirely. Beast won their first award, Rookie of the Month for December, awarded by the Ministry of Culture, Sports and Tourism.

In early 2010, Beast promoted their second single, "Mystery", from the mini-album, with live performances on the weekly music shows. The members created their own humorous amateur music video for the song, featuring fellow Korean pop singers including members of Girls' Generation and Kara. The mini-album went on to sell 40,000 copies, an unusual feat for a Korean rookie group, with the album's original print run of 20,000 copies selling out in its first month.

On February 14, 2012, Beast's official YouTube channel uploaded a special music video for "Mystery". Beast first premiered this music video during their 'Beautiful Show' world tour concert in Seoul. The video was played in lieu of the group's actual performance of the song, ending with the word "EASY" as the introduction to their next song in the lineup.

== Track listing ==
No.	Title	Lyrics	Music	Arrangement	Length
1.	"Beast Is the B2ST"	Beast	Shin Sa Dong Tiger, Choi Gyu Seong	Shin Sa Dong Tiger	1:36
2.	"Bad Girl" (배드걸; Baedeu Geol)	Lee Sang Ho, Shin Sa Dong Tiger, Beast	Lee Sang Ho, Shin Sa Dong Tiger	Shin Sa Dong Tiger	3:16
3.	"Mystery" (미스테리; Miseuteri)	Lee Sang Ho, Kang Ji Won, Shin Sa Dong Tiger, Yong Junhyung	Lee Sang Ho, Kang Ji Won, Shin Sa Dong Tiger	Lee Sang Ho, Kang Ji Won,	3:30
4.	"Ajigeun" (아직은, lit. Yet)	Shin Sa Dong Tiger, Jeon Hye Won, Yong Junhyung	Shin Sa Dong Tiger	Shin Sa Dong Tiger	3:42
5.	"Oasis" (오아시스; Oasiseu)	Hwang Song Jin, Kim Ki Bum, Kang Ji Won, Yong Junhyung	Kim Ki Bum, Kang Ji Won	Kang Ji Won	3:48
Total length:					15:52

"Bad Girl" was Beast's debut single. The song "Mystery" was later performed to help promote the group's debut EP.

== Controversy ==
On November 11, 2009, Korean broadcaster KBS banned the playing of the song "Ajigeun" because of a phrase that had the potential to be misheard and misunderstood as an offensive word. Within the lyrics, "the loneliness surrounds me as I spend the night in tears, shh," the exclamation "shh" is heard as the offensive word "shit." Cube Entertainment responded to the ban by stating that the word was not used as an offensive word, instead it expresses the feelings of a person who has no experience in breaking up.

== Charts ==
=== Weekly charts ===
Chart (2010)	Peak position
South Korean Albums (Gaon)	11

=== Year-end charts ===
Chart (2010)	Position
South Korean Albums (Gaon)	59
