= Good Luck (Beast EP) =

EP by Beast
- Released: June 16, 2014
- Genre: K-pop; Dance-pop; R&B
- Length: 25:04
- Language: Korean
- Label: Cube Entertainment, Universal Music Group

Beast chronology
Hard to Love, How to Love (2013)	Good Luck (2014)	Time (2014)

Singles from Good Luck
- 1. "No More" Released: June 10, 2014; 2. "Good Luck" Released: June 17, 2014

Good Luck is the seventh extended play by South Korean boy group Beast. It was released on June 16, 2014 by Cube Entertainment.

== Track listing ==
No.	Title	Lyrics	Music	Arrangement	Length
1.	"We Up"	Kim Tae-joo, Yong Jun-hyung	Kim Tae-joo, Yong Jun-hyung	Kim Tae-joo, Yong Jun-hyung	3:17
2.	"Good Luck"	Kim Tae-joo, Yong Jun-hyung	Kim Tae-joo, Yong Jun-hyung	Kim Tae-joo, Yong Jun-hyung	3:23
3.	"Dance With U"	Kim Tae-joo, Yong Jun-hyung	Kim Tae-joo, Yong Jun-hyung	Kim Tae-joo, Yong Jun-hyung	3:16
4.	"No More" (이젠 아니야; Ijen Aniya)	Kim Tae-joo, Yong Jun-hyung	Kim Tae-joo, Yong Jun-hyung	Kim Tae-joo, Yong Jun-hyung	4:00
5.	"History"	Yong Jun-hyung, Lee Gi-kwang, Noday	Lee Gi-kwang, Noday	Noday	3:40
6.	"Tonight, I'll Be At Your Side" (이 밤 너의 곁으로; I Bam Neoui Gyeoteuro)	Jeon Hae Seong	Jeon Hae Seong	Jeon Hae Seong	4:08
7.	"Sad Movie (Korean version)"	Kim Tae-joo, Yong Jun-hyung	Kim Tae-joo, Yong Jun-hyung	Kim Tae-joo, Yong Jun-hyung	3:18
Total length:					25:04

== Chart performance ==
Chart	Peak position	Sales
Gaon Weekly album chart	1	KOR: 134,449+
Gaon Monthly albums chart	2	KOR: 134,449+
