= Good Luck (Beast song) =

2014 single by Beast

Single by Beast

from the album Good Luck
- Released: June 16, 2014
- Genre: K-pop; EDM
- Length: 3:22
- Label: Cube
- Songwriters: Kim Tae-joo; Yong Jun-hyung
- Producers: Kim Tae-joo; Yong Jun-hyung

Beast singles chronology
"No More" (2014)	"Good Luck" (2014)	"12:30" (2015)

Music video
- "Good Luck" on YouTube

"Good Luck" is a song recorded by South Korea boy band Beast for their sixth extended play of the same name (2014). The song was written by its producers Kim Tae-joo and Yong Jun-hyung. It was released by Cube Entertainment on June 16, 2014, as the album's lead single.

== Background and release ==
On May 27, 2014, Cube Entertainment announced that Beast releasing their sixth extended play, titled Good Luck on June 16. On June 4, Beast posted the track list of Good Luck which revealed "Good Luck" as a track on the album. Good luck yielded two singles. The first one, "No More", was released on June 10, 2014, through Cube Entertainment. "Good Luck", the second single from the EP, was made available for digital download and streaming on June 16, 2014.

In the lead-up to the release of the song, two music video teasers were released on June 12 and 13 at midnight. The final group image teaser was released on June 15 at midnight. The music video was officially released the next day in conjunction with the release of the album. The video is dance-oriented and features the members performing choreography.

== Composition ==
"Good Luck" was written and produced by Yong Joon-hyung and Kim Tae-ju. "Good Luck" is an EDM song featuring big band, trap beats, and '80s synth-pop elements. The song relies on a "fizzy" electronic production that includes "speaker-quivering" bass, an array of strings, squibs of siren. The song features "ominous" cellos, "sneering" violins and other orchestral instruments in an arrangement of "emotional" piano lines and crooning vocals. Incorporating a sublime and "catchy" chorus, the track sees the members singing, rapping, and belting while making use of higher registers in the verses. Lyrically, it is a "lovelorn breakup track that spans 360 degrees of entertainment and emotions."

== Reception ==
The song topped the domestic music charts, and eventually achieved a Perfect All-Kill, as the single reached number one on all of the major South Korean music sites simultaneously. "Good Luck" was a commercial success in South Korea. It debuted atop the Gaon Digital Chart for the week ending June 21, 2014. It was the seventh best-selling song of June 2014, selling 353,158 downloads. The single additionally peaked at numbers three and five on the K-pop Hot 100 and World Digital Song Sales, respectively.

The song ranked at number 2 on Dazed's 20 Best K-pop Songs of 2014. Jeff Benjamin and Jessica Oak of Billboard selected it as the K-pop best song of the year, praising Beast for "pulling fresh music inspirations while still retaining their band's signature energy" and wrote: "There isn't much more you could ask -- or that could fit -- in this meticulously put-together tour de force." "Good Luck" surpassed 705,909 downloads in December 2014 on Gaon Music Chart.

== Awards ==
"Good Luck" achieved the top spot on various South Korean weekly music programs, such as KBS' Music Bank, MBC Music's Show Champion, SBS' Inkigayo, and MBC's Show! Music Core due to its success on digital platforms. The song won seven music show awards, including three consecutive wins on Music bank and Show! Music Core garnering a total of nine awards.

Music program awards
Program	Network	Date	Ref.
M Countdown	Mnet	June 26, 2014	
Music Bank	KBS2	June 27, 2014	
Music Bank	KBS2	July 4, 2014	
Music Bank	KBS2	July 11, 2014	
Show! Music Core	MBC	June 28, 2014	
Show! Music Core	MBC	July 5, 2014	
Show! Music Core	MBC	July 12, 2014	
Inkigayo	SBS	June 29, 2014	
Show Champion	MBC Music	July 2, 2014	

== Promotion ==
To promote the song and Good Luck, Beast made appearances on several South Korean music programs around June and July 2014. They performed the song for the first time for M! Countdown on June 19, 2014, as part of their comeback stage. The following three days, the group appeared on Music Bank, Show! Music Core, and Inkigayo to perform the song.

== Charts ==
Chart (2014)	Peak position
South Korea (Gaon)	1

== See also ==
- List of Gaon Digital Chart number ones of 2014
