= Fiction and Fact =

Studio album by Beast
- Released: May 17, 2011
- Recorded: 2011
- Genres: K-pop, dance-pop, electropop, hip hop
- Length: 35:24
- Labels: Cube Entertainment, Universal Music Group
- Producer: Hong Seung Seong

Beast chronology
My Story (2010)	Fiction and Fact (2011)	So Beast (2011)

Singles from Fiction and Fact
- 1. "On Rainy Days" Released: May 12, 2011; 2. "Fiction" Released: May 17, 2011

Fiction and Fact is the first studio album by South Korean boy band Beast. It was released on May 17, 2011, by Cube Entertainment and contains 10 songs, including the singles "On Rainy Days" and "Fiction". The album peaked at number one on the Gaon Album Chart and was the fifth best-selling album of 2011 in South Korea, selling over 142,000 copies by the end of the year.

The album garnered Beast a win for Artist of the Year for the 2nd Quarter at the 2011 Gaon Chart Music Awards, while "Fiction" won Song of the Year at the 2011 KBS Music Festival.

== Background ==
On May 9, 2011, Cube Entertainment announced on its website that Beast would release their first studio album on May 17, 2011. The label said the album had the dramatic structure of a novel and would showcase "luxurious" musical arrangements.

== Composition ==
Fiction and Fact includes 10 songs which range from emotional ballads to fast dance tracks.

The album's pre-release single, “On Rainy Days", is a guitar-backed ballad about heartbreak that the group reportedly actually recorded on a rainy day. A company representative said, "While Beast was singing this song, all the members were emotional and shed tears", adding, "The recording was stopped several times due to continuous tears". The song was written and produced by Choi Gyu-seong of Black Eyed Pilseung.

The lead single "Fiction" was written and produced by Choi Gyu-seong and Shinsadong Tiger, the latter of whom previously wrote the Beast singles "Bad Girl" and "Shock". "Fiction" is a dance song that combines "addictive piano riffs" with the melody of a ballad. It tells the story of a man who can't accept a break-up so he writes a novel to continue his love story alone.

Album track "Freeze" was co-written and co-arranged by Beast member Yong Jun-hyung alongside Shinsadong Tiger.

== Release and promotion ==
On May 12, 2011, “On Rainy Days" was released as a digital single. On May 17, Fiction and Fact was released in physical and digital forms, followed by a music video for the album's lead single "Fiction". The video, which was dubbed a "music drama", features actress Park Bo-young playing the former lover of Beast member Yong Jun-hyung.

Beast began promotions for Fiction and Fact on May 19 on Mnet‘s M Countdown, where they performed "On Rainy Days" and "Fiction". In order to capture the feelings of these two very different songs, the M Countdown staff prepared two different stage sets. For the performance of "On Rainy Days", they built an atmosphere simulating rain, while they created an unrealistic, dreamlike stage for "Fiction".

A week later, on May 26, Beast won their first first-place award for "Fiction" on M Countdown and subsequently won first place for the show's June 2 and June 9 episodes. They also won first place on KBS Music Bank's May 27 episode for "On Rainy Days", while "Fiction" won first place on the show's June 3 and June 10 episodes. Their title track also won first place on SBS Inkigayo's June 5 and June 12 episodes.

Beast ended their Korean promotions for Fiction or Fact on June 19 on SBS Inkigayo in order to promote their second Japanese single, "Bad Girl", in Japan.

== Commercial performance ==
Fiction and Fact entered the Gaon Album Chart at the number four spot, peaking two weeks later at number one. It was the chart's number one album of May 2011, with 90,000 copies sold, and the fifth best-selling album of 2011 in South Korea. As of the end of 2013, Fiction and Fact has sold 164,264 copies.

Singles "On Rainy Days" and Fiction" peaked at number three and number five, respectively, on the Gaon Digital Chart. Both songs have sold more than 3 million digital copies, placing them among the best-selling singles in South Korea.

== Controversy ==
On July 14, 2011, Ministry of Gender Equality and Family (MOGEF) placed a ban on "On Rainy Days" because it “contained content that’s harmful to youth”. The agency cited the line "I think I'm drunk, I should stop drinking" as possibly encouraging young listeners to drink. In response to the ban, member Yang Yoseob posted on his Twitter, "I think I'm going to start singing children songs. I need Tylenol" then added, "This is just too much. Sigh... we can't perform with this song, agh".

On August 25, 2011, Cube Entertainment filed a lawsuit against the Ministry of Gender Equality and Family, requesting that they nullify the ban on the song. A Cube representative stated "The lyrics did not intend to glamorize drinking nor encourage it. The song is not about drinking at all, but rather a love story." They continued, "Considering the fact that the MOGEF has failed to ban other songs that contain strong lyrical content talking directly about topics that are more harmful to the youth, Beast's ban is a violation of equality." On September 8, 2011, the Seoul Administrative Court suspended the MOGEF's ban, ruling that it should reverse its decision to designate the song as harmful to youths. The court ruled in favour of Cube Entertainment, stating that the lyrics alone do not encourage drinking or smoking amongst youths.

On April 15, 2017, An independent Thai rapper has been accused of plagiarizing BEAST's “Fiction” in one of his latest and most popular tracks. Thai rapper, SOLOIST, released a song titled “Just Married” as part of his newest mixtape and it has been drawing a lot of criticism from the K-Pop community. In response to all the criticism from netizens, SOLOIST posted up a new statement on his Facebook saying that he had contacted Cube Entertainment and was granted permission to use the "Fiction" instrumental track.

== Track listing ==
No.	Title	Lyrics	Music	Arrangement	Length
1.	"The Fact"	Shinsadong Tiger, Choi Gyu Seong, Yong Jun-hyung	Shinsadong Tiger, Choi Gyu Seong	Shinsadong Tiger, Choi Gyu Seong	2:20
2.	"Fiction"	Shinsadong Tiger, Choi Gyu Seong, Yong Jun-hyung	Shinsadong Tiger, Choi Gyu Seong	Shinsadong Tiger	3:55
3.	"Back to You"	Seo Yong-bae, Seo Jae-woo, Yong Jun-hyung	Seo Yong-bae, Seo Jae-woo	Seo Yong-bae, Seo Jae-woo	3:08
4.	"You"	Choi Gyu-seong, Rado, Yong Jun-hyung	Choi Gyu-seong, Rado	Choi Gyu-seong	3:51
5.	"Freeze"	Yong Jun-hyung, Kim Tae-joo	Yong Jun-hyung, Kim Tae-joo	Shinsadong Tiger, Yong Jun-hyung, Kim Tae-joo	3:33
6.	"Virus"	Nang-ee, Beom-ee, Yong Jun-hyung	Nang-ee, Beom-ee	Nang-ee, Beom-ee	3:25
7.	"불러보지만" (Bulleobojiman; Though I Call Your Name)	Park Soo-seok, Marco	Park Soo-seok, Im Sang-hyuk, Marco	Park Soo-seok, Marco	3:50
8.	"비가 오는 날엔" (Biga Oneun Naren; On Rainy Days)	Choi Gyu-seong, Yong Jun-hyung	Choi Gyu-seong	Choi Gyu-seong	3:46
9.	"Lightless" (Unplugged Version)	Shinsadong Tiger, Choi Gyu-seong, Rado, Yong Jun-hyung	Shinsadong Tiger, Choi Gyu-seong, Rado	Go Myeong-jae	3:26
10.	"Fiction" (Orchestra Version)	Shinsadong Tiger, Choi Gyu-seong, Yong Jun-hyung	Shinsadong Tiger, Choi Gyu-seong	Kwon Seok-hong	4:15
Total length:					35:24

== Personnel ==
- Hong Seung-seong - executive producer
- Shin Jeong-hwa - executive producer
- Park Choong-min - executive supervisor
- No Hyeon-tae - director
- Im Sang-hyeok - music supervisor
- Seo Jae-woo - A&R
- Jo Seong-joon - mixing engineer (M.Cube Studio)
- Hong Seong-joon - mixing engineer (Mojo Studio)
- Jeong Taek-joo - mixing engineer (Sum Sound)
- Jo Joon-sang - mixing engineer (W Sound)
- Shin Jae-bin - recording engineer (M.Cube Studio)
- Kwon Hae-joon - recording engineer (TS Studio)
- Park Seon-young - recording engineer (TS Studio)
- Choi Hyo-young - mastering engineer (Sonic Mastering Studio)

== Charts ==
=== Weekly charts ===
Chart (2011)	Peak position
South Korean Albums (Gaon)	1

=== Year-end charts ===
Chart (2011)	Position
South Korean Albums (Gaon)	5

Chart (2012)	Position
South Korean Albums (Gaon)	80

== Release history ==
Country	Date	Format	Label
South Korea	May 17, 2011	Digital download, CD	Cube Entertainment; Universal Music Group
South Korea	May 25, 2011	Limited Edition	Cube Entertainment; Universal Music Group
Taiwan	June 17, 2011	CD	Universal Music Taiwan
Philippines	July 16, 2011	CD	MCA Music
