= Mastermind (EP) =

EP by Beast
- Released: September 30, 2010
- Recorded: 2010
- Genre: K-pop; dance-pop; electrohop; R&B
- Length: 15:50
- Language: Korean
- Label: Cube Entertainment
- Producer: Hong Shin-seong

Beast chronology
Shock of the New Era (2010)	Mastermind (2010)	Lights Go On Again (2010)

Singles from Mastermind
- 1. "Breath" Released: September 30, 2010

Mastermind is the third mini-album by South Korean boy band Beast, and was released by Cube Entertainment on September 30, 2010. The lead single "Soom" is composed by Shinsadong Tiger and Choi Gyusung with lyrics written by both the composers, Rado and member Yong Junhyung. The song "Break Down" is created by Lim Sanghyuk and Lee Joohyung.

The song "Mastermind", just like the title of the album, served as the intro track with the word meaning, “someone who can control other object with ease.” It has the hidden meaning of Beast wanting to remove the rookie image and state of the public that they want to show their own style of music.

== History ==
On September 16, 2010, Cube Entertainment announced that Beast would be revealing a ballad-R&B single from their third album prior to Beast's comeback. On September 17 at 10 AM KST, "Jumeogeul Kkwak Jwigo" was revealed on an online music site. "Jumeogeul Kkwak Jwigo" rose up to first place on various music sites.

On September 24 at 10 AM KST, a teaser video for the lead single "Soom" was released on Beast's official homepage and other various online portal sites. The visit from the fans waiting for the release of the video of Beast's comeback caused an amount of traffic that caused the server to go down for a moment. In the teaser, member Yong Jun Hyung was seen lying on the ground where Son Naeun, dressed in red, put on an oxygen mask for him and gains conscience. Other scenes in the teaser video showed Lee Gi Kwang and Jang Hyun Seung dancing and showing off their muscular builds in the rain.

On September 25 and 26, teaser audio clips for "Soom" were revealed on KBS's COOL FM Narsha's Raise the Volume. A military-look concept photo for Mastermind was revealed on September 27, showing off Beast's manly side along with a chic modern feel.

Beast released the full music video to "Soom" on September 28 and made a comeback on KBS's Music Bank on September 30, performing "Breath" and a shorter version of "Mastermind".

== Choreography ==
The dance for "Soom" was choreographed by Haw from South Korean hip hop dance crew, Prepix and co-choreographed by Mike Song.

== Track listing ==
No.	Title	Lyrics	Music	Length
1.	"Mastermind" (마스터 마인드; Maseuteo Maindeu)	Shinsadong Tiger, Yong Junhyung	Shinsadong Tiger	1:35
2.	"숨 (Soom)" ("Breath")	Shinsadong Tiger, Choi Gyusung, Rado, Yong Junhyung	Shinsadong Tiger, Choi Gyusung	3:31
3.	"V.I.U (Very Important U)"	Super Changthai	Super Changthai	3:06
4.	"Break Down"	Lim Sanghyuk, Lee Joohyung	Lim Sanghyuk, Lee Joohyung	3:35
5.	"주먹을 꽉 쥐고 (Jumeogeul Kkwak Jwigo)" ("Clenching a Tight Fist")	Ahn Youngmin	Ahn Youngmin	4:02
Total length:				15:50

== Charts ==
=== Albums chart ===
Chart	Peak position
Gaon albums chart	2

=== Singles chart ===
Song	Peak position
Song	Gaon Chart
"Soom"	4
"Clenching a Tight Fist"	10

== Release history ==
Country	Date	Format	Label
South Korea	September 28, 2010	Digital download	Cube Entertainment
South Korea	September 30, 2010	[[Compact disc}CD]]	Cube Entertainment
