= Kim Won-seok =

South Korean television director

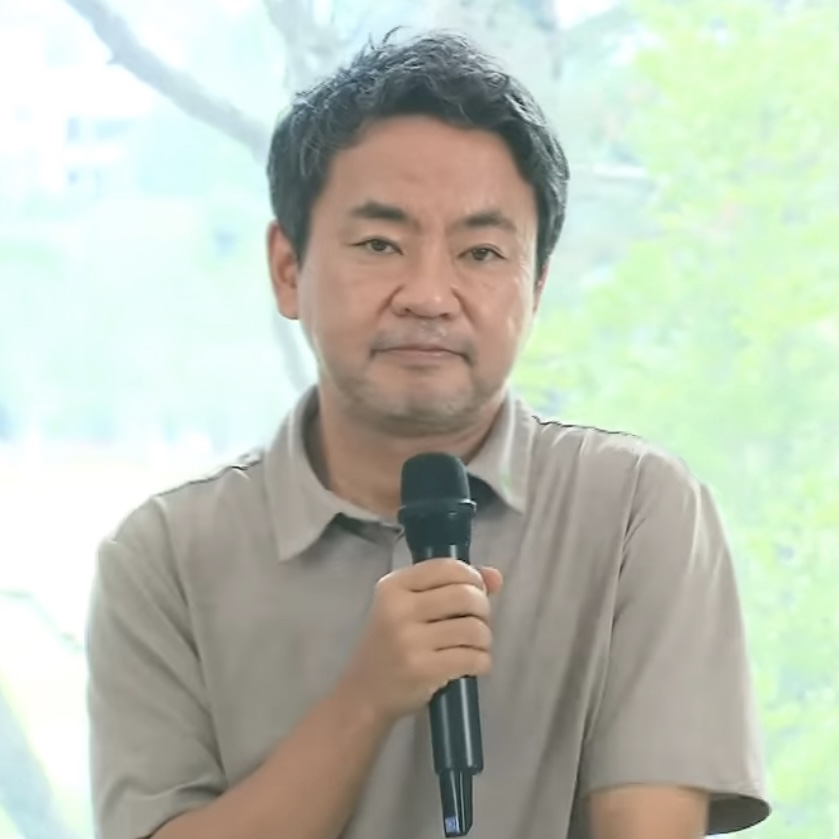
- Kim in 2025
- Born: 1977 (age 48–49); South Korea
- Occupation: Television director
- Years active: 2001-present
- Employer(s): KBS (2001-2011); CJ E&M (2011-2016); Studio Dragon (2016-2019); Baram Pictures (Note: A subsidiary of Kakao M) (2020-present)

Korean name
- Hangul: 김원석
- Hanja: 金元錫
- RR: Gim Wonseok
- MR: Kim Wŏnsŏk

Kim Won-seok (Korean: 김원석) is a South Korean television director. He directed Sungkyunkwan Scandal (2010), Monstar (2013), Misaeng (2014), Signal (2016), My Mister (2018), Arthdal Chronicles (2019) and When Life Gives You Tangerines (2025).

== Career ==
Kim Won-seok began his television career in 2001 as an assistant director for the Korean Broadcasting System (KBS) network. He was promoted to second unit director in 2005, and honed his skills on series of diverse genres. He also directed two episodes for the single-episode anthology Drama City in 2007, GOD (which he co-wrote) and The Dual Accounts Murder.

Kim's first television drama series as main director was fusion historical drama Sungkyunkwan Scandal in 2010. Based on Jung Eun-gwol's bestselling 2007 novel The Lives of Sungkyunkwan Confucian Scholars, it depicted the friendship and love that develops between four classmates (including a girl disguised as a boy) attending Sungkyunkwan, Joseon's highest educational institute where no women were allowed. Despite solid but unspectacular viewership ratings, Sungkyunkwan Scandal became a cult hit among younger viewers, resulting in increased popularity for its cast Park Min-young, Park Yoo-chun, Yoo Ah-in and Song Joong-ki, and several trophies at the 2010 KBS Drama Awards. Kim won Best New Television Director at the 47th Baeksang Arts Awards, and Best Director at the 4th Korea Drama Awards.

After leaving Kim KBS, in August 2011 Kim signed with media conglomerate CJ E&M, which owns cable channels Mnet and tvN. His first project post-move was a 30-minute music video for Superstar K3 starring the reality show's remaining contestants, titled Superstar K3: The Beginning. Then inspired by the American show Glee, Kim directed Mnet's first-ever musical drama, Monstar in 2013. It was Kim's third time to collaborate with screenwriter Kim Tae-hee (after The Dual Accounts Murder and Sungkyunkwan Scandal). Auditions were held, and Kim cast rookie actress Ha Yeon-soo, K-pop singer Yong Jun-hyung and stage actor Kang Ha-neul in the lead roles.

When tvN announced that Kim would next adapt Yoon Tae-ho's webtoon Misaeng (lit. "Incomplete Life") about a former baduk player who becomes an office temp worker at a trading company, it became one of the most anticipated Korean TV series of 2014. The workplace dramedy Misaeng had no A-list stars (its cast was led by Yim Si-wan and Lee Sung-min), but it struck a chord among viewers and critics, unexpectedly becoming a huge ratings hit for cable and a pop culture phenomenon. Kim said, "As cartoonist Yoon said he had rejected every offer from major broadcasters who wanted to dramatize his cartoon because they wanted to insert a love-hate relationship as dramatic devices for TV version. But I told him we wouldn't do that. We, instead, focused more on life of ordinary people like the original cartoon to give glimpse at office life. [...] I wanted to make a realistic drama about ordinary people." Misaeng won the Grand Prize (Daesang) at the 9th Cable TV Broadcasting Awards, while Kim won Best Television Director at the 51st Baeksang Arts Awards, beating nominees from terrestrial channels.

Kim next cast Lee Je-hoon, Kim Hye-soo and Cho Jin-woong in Signal, based on the real-life unsolved serial rape-murders of ten women in the city of Hwaseong between 1986 and 1991 (the case also inspired Memories of Murder and Gap-dong). In Signal, detectives from the present and the past communicate across time and space through a two-way radio to solve the crimes. The series was a critical and commercial success, and is currently the second highest-rated drama in Korean cable television history. Signal won several awards from award-giving bodies including Best Drama at the 52nd Baeksang Arts Awards.

From 2016 to 2019, Kim was under Studio Dragon, the production company spun off from CJ E&M. In December 2019, he resigned from the company for personal reasons.

In January 2020, an exclusive report stated that Kim has joined Kakao M's soon-to-be-launched new drama production subsidiary to be led by former Studio Dragon and CJ E&M executive Park Ho-sik. Seven months later, the company, Baram Pictures, was officially launched.

In August 2022, it was reported that Kim will work with writer Lim Sang-choon to develop series under the working title Life (Korean: 인생; RR: Insaeng). In December 2022, production designer Ryu Seong-hie confirmed her involvement. The original Korean title, Pokssak sogatsuda (Korean: 폭싹 속았수다), was revealed on January 27, 2023. This Jeju language expression translates to "thank you for your hard work." The English title, When Life Gives You Tangerines, was announced on January 30, 2023, and is a word play on the proverb "When life gives you lemons, make lemonade. The production cost of the series is reported to be around ₩60 billion.

The series received eight nominations at the 61st Baeksang Arts Awards, the most of any series that year, including Best Director. It won four awards. In the first stage of the Grand Prize evaluation, IU, Lim Sang-choon, director Kim Won-seok, and When Life Gives You Tangerines made it as candidate. (Note: They were nominated alongside Kim Tae-ri, Yoo Jae-suk, and Culinary Class Wars) The finalists entering the second phase of judging were IU, Kim Won-seok, and When Life Gives You Tangerines against unscripted Netflix show Culinary Class Wars, with the show ultimately winning the Grand Prize. It also received the most nomination in 2025 Blue Dragon Series Awards with six categories.

On May 2, 2025, it was announced that writer Park Ji-eun, actor Gang Dong-won, and director Kim Won-seok will collaborate on a new drama project The drama, currently in the planning stages with a script in development, will blend romance and historical elements. Gang Dong-won is actively involved in the project, working closely with the production team from the early stages. This marks his first collaboration with both director and writer. The drama is being co-produced by Studio Dragon, Studio AA, Culture Depot, Baram Pictures, and Imaginus.

== Filmography ==
=== Television series ===
Filmographies
Year	Title	Network	Credited as			Note
Year	Title	Network	assistant director	second unit director	director	Note
2001–2002	School 4	KBS2	Yes	No	No	
2002	Loving You	KBS2	Yes	No	No	
2003	Wife	KBS2	Yes	No	No	
2003-2004	Age of Warriors	KBS2	Yes	No	No	
2004–2005	Immortal Admiral Yi Sun-sin	KBS1	Yes	No	No	
2005	18 vs. 29	KBS2	Yes	No	No	
2005–2006	Hometown Station	KBS1	No	Yes	No	
2006	As the River Flows	KBS1	No	Yes	No	
2008	The Great King, Sejong	KBS1	No	Yes	No	
2009	Partner	KBS2	No	Yes	No	
2010	Cinderella's Sister	KBS2	No	Yes	No	
2007	Drama City "GOD"	KBS2	No	No	Yes	also credited as screenwriter
2007	Drama City "The Dual Accounts Murder"	KBS2	No	No	Yes	
2010	Sungkyunkwan Scandal	KBS2	No	No	Yes	
2013	Monstar	Mnet	No	No	Yes	
2014	Misaeng	tvN	No	No	Yes	
2016	Signal	tvN	No	No	Yes	
2018	My Mister	tvN	No	No	Yes	
2019	Arthdal Chronicles	tvN	No	No	Yes	
2025	When Life Gives You Tangerines	Netflix	No	No	Yes	
TBA	Soul †	TBA	No	No	Yes	

== Casting ==
Kim frequently re-casts actors whom he has worked with on previous dramas.

Recurring casts
Actor Work	IU	Jung Hae-kyun	Jo Sung-ha	Kang Ha-neul	Kim Kap-soo	Kim Won-hae	Oh Jung-se	Song Joong-ki	Park Hae-joon	Son Sook
Age of Warriors					check					
The Great King, Sejong					check					
Cinderella's Stepsister					check					
Sungkyunkwan Scandal			check					check		
Monstar				check						
Misaeng				check		check	check		check	
Signal		check				check				
My Mister	check	check							check	check
Arthdal Chronicles			check					check	check	check
When Life Gives You Tangerines	check	check					check		check	

== Accolades ==
=== Awards and nominations ===
Awards and nominations
Year	Award	Category	Nominated work	Result	Ref.
2011	47th Baeksang Arts Awards	Best New Director	Sungkyunkwan Scandal	Won	
2011	4th Korea Drama Awards	Best Director	Sungkyunkwan Scandal	Won	
2015	Cable TV Broadcast Awards	Grand Prize (Best Drama)	Misaeng: Incomplete Life	Won	
2015	51st Baeksang Arts Awards	Best Director	Misaeng: Incomplete Life	Won	
2015	Seoul Drama Awards	Best Drama	Misaeng: Incomplete Life	Won	
2016	52nd Baeksang Arts Awards	Best Drama	Signal	Won	
2016	52nd Baeksang Arts Awards	Best Director	Signal	Nominated	
2016	9th Korea Drama Awards	Best Director	Signal	Nominated	
2018	6th APAN Star Awards	Best Director	My Mister	Won	
2019	55th Baeksang Arts Awards	Best Drama	My Mister	Won	
2019	55th Baeksang Arts Awards	Best Director	My Mister	Nominated	
2019	The Seoul Awards	Grand Prize	My Mister	Won	
2025	61st Baeksang Arts Awards	Best Drama	When Life Gives You Tangerines	Won	
2025	61st Baeksang Arts Awards	Best Director	When Life Gives You Tangerines	Nominated	
2025	4th Blue Dragon Series Awards	Grand Prize	When Life Gives You Tangerines	Won	
2025	4th Blue Dragon Series Awards	Best Drama	When Life Gives You Tangerines	Nominated	
2025	Asia Contents Awards & Global OTT Awards	Best Creative	When Life Gives You Tangerines	Won	
2025	Asia Contents Awards & Global OTT Awards	Best Director	When Life Gives You Tangerines	Nominated	
2025	11th APAN Star Awards	Best Director	When Life Gives You Tangerines	Won	
2025	11th APAN Star Awards	Drama of the Year	When Life Gives You Tangerines	Won	
2025	Seoul International Drama Awards	Best Director	When Life Gives You Tangerines	Pending	

=== State honors ===
Name of country, year given, and name of honor
Country	Award Ceremony	Year	Honor	Ref.
South Korea	Korean Content Awards (Note: Honors are given at the Korean Content Awards (대한민국 콘텐츠 대상) arranged by the Korea Creative Content Agency and hosted by the Ministry of Culture, Sports and Tourism. The 2022 Korea Content Awards Ceremony, which started in 2009 and celebrated its 14th this year, aims to inspire pride in the content industry and develop the Korean cultural content industry by discovering and awarding contributors and excellent content that have contributed to the development of the content industry in 2022. It is a place to promote. The winners (works) of honor, which are recommended through the website of the Korea Creative Content Agency (www.kocca.kr) and announced through careful examination by experts and three-step verification, play a leading role in shining the Korean content industry in the world.)	2015	Presidential Commendation; Broadcast Video Industry Development Contribution Category (Drama Category) for Misaeng: Incomplete Life	
