= Misaeng =

Misaeng (Korean: 미생; Hanja: 未生) may refer to:

- Misaeng (manhwa), a 2012 manhwa
- Misaeng: Incomplete Life, a 2014 TV series based on the manhwa
