= Yong Jun-hyung discography =

- Studio albums: 1
- EPs: 2
- Singles: 7
- Collaborations: 6
- Soundtrack appearances: 7
- Music Videos: 4

The discography of South Korean singer-songwriter, rapper, record producer Yong Jun-hyung consists of one studio album, two extended plays, and seven singles.

== Studio album ==
Title	Details	Peak chart positions	Sales
Title	Details	KOR	Sales
Goodbye 20's	Released: May 9, 2018; Label: Around Us Entertainment, Kakao M; Formats: CD, Digital download	2	KOR: 29,912

== Extended play ==
Title	Details	Peak chart positions	Sales
Title	Details	KOR	Sales
Flower	Released: December 13, 2013; Label: Cube Entertainment, Universal Music Korea; Formats: CD, digital download	4	KOR: 29,774; JPN: 800
Loner	Released: November 10, 2022; Label: Black Made; Formats: CD, digital download	14	KOR: 13,804
Beautiful Dystopia	Released: March 25, 2024; Label: Black Made; Formats: CD, digital download	59	KOR: 1,286

== Singles ==
=== As lead artist ===
Title	Year	Peak chart positions	Sales (DL)	Album
Title	Year	KOR	Sales (DL)	Album
"Living Without You" (너 없이 사는 것도)	2012	8	KOR: 741,742	Non-album single
"Flower"	2013	23	KOR: 158,116	Flower
"After This Moment" (이 노래가 끝나면) (feat. Davii)	2016	24	KOR: 89,110	Non album-singles
"Wonder If" (그대로일까) (feat. Heize)	2017	18	KOR: 128,096	Non album-singles
"Sudden Shower" (소나기) (feat. 10cm)	2018	5	—N/a	Non album-singles
"Go Away" (무슨 말이 필요해)	2018	38	—N/a	Goodbye 20's
"Empty" (빈털터리) (feat. Suran)	2019	148	—N/a	Non-album single
"Koong" (층간 소음)	2022	— (Note: "Koong" did not enter the Circle Digital Chart, but peaked at number 131 on the Circle Download Chart.)	—N/a	Loner
"Post It" (feat. Sion)	2023	—	—N/a	Non-album singles
"Love Song"	2023	—	—N/a	Non-album singles
"Fall Into Blue"	2023	—	—N/a	Non-album singles
"Tomorrow"	2024	—	—N/a	Beautiful Dystopia

=== Collaborations ===
Title	Year	Peak chart positions	Sales	Album
Title	Year	KOR	Sales	Album
"Thanks To" (with Yoseob)	2010	46	—N/a	My Story
"Faddy Robot Foundation" (with Vasco, Verbal Jint, Sangchu, Outsider, Joosuc, Hyuna, Zico)	2010	—	—N/a	Non-album single
"Should I Hug or Not" (with Doojoon & Gikwang)	2011	16	KOR: 404,008	Shinsa Dong Tiger Project: Supermarket – The Half
"You Got Some Nerve" (with Feeldog & LE)	2013	13	KOR: 217,923	Non-album singles
"You Got Some Nerve" (Explicit Ver.) (with Feeldog & LE)	2013	56	—N/a	Non-album singles
"Tell Me It's Okay" (with Luna & Doni)	2016	—	—N/a	Hyung-Don's HIT MAKER
"—" denotes releases that did not chart or were not released in that region.

=== As featured artist ===
Title	Year	Peak chart positions	Sales	Album
Title	Year	KOR	Sales	Album
"Change" (Hyuna feat. Junhyung)	2010	2	KOR: 2,669,354	Non-album single
"I'll Back Off So You Can Live Better" (G.NA feat. Junhyung)	2010	2	KOR: 1,772,952	Draw G's First Breath
"It's Love If You're Crazy" (Young Jee feat. Junhyung)	2010	—	—N/a	Non-album singles
"It's Love If You're Crazy" (Young Jee feat. Gummy & Junhyung)	2010	—	—N/a	Non-album singles
"Go Back Again" (Navi feat. Junhyung)	2011	—	—N/a	Hello
"The Heartbreaking Story" (Wheesung feat. Junhyung)	2011	2	KOR: 1,731,878	Non-album singles
"Silly Boy" (015B feat. 4Minute & Junhyung)	2011	—	—N/a	Non-album singles
"A Bitter Day" (Hyuna feat. Junhyung & G.NA)	2011	10	KOR: 1,089,791	Bubble Pop!
"Be Quiet" (Kim Wan-sun feat. Junhyung)	2011	55	KOR: 126,520	Non-album single
"Don't Act Countrified" (ALi feat. Junhyung)	2011	4	KOR: 1,323,942	Soul-Ri: A Village with Soul
"Up to the Sky" (Apink feat. Junhyung)	2012	156	—N/a	Une Année
"Good Boy" (Baek Ji-young feat, Junhyung)	2012	3	KOR: 1,478,459	Good Boy
"Hate You" (Eru feat. Junhyung)	2012	24	KOR: 325,070	Feel Brand New Part 2
"She's Bad" (Natthew feat. Junhyung)	2012	—	—N/a	Non-album singles
"What I See" (Prepix feat. Junhyung, Beenzino, and Esna)	2012	—	—N/a	Non-album singles
"Caffeine" (Yoseob feat. Junhyung)	2012	2	KOR: 1,636,851	The First Collage
"Glass Heart" (LYn feat. Junhyung)	2013	35	KOR: 589,214	LYn 8th #1 'Glass Heart'
"Don't Walk Away" (Kim Jae-joong feat. Junhyung)	2013	—	—N/a	WWW
"8dayz" (Megan Lee feat. Junhyung)	2014	63	KOR: 62,027	Non-album singles
"My Dear" (Park Shin-hye feat. Junhyung)	2014	—	KOR: 16,835	Non-album singles
"Let It Go" (MFBTY feat. Junhyung)	2015	—	KOR: 15,286	WondaLand
"Don't Come Back" (Heize feat. Junhyung)	2016	11	KOR: 2,160,059+	Non-album singles
"Don't You Worry" (Davii feat. Junhyung)	2016	—	—N/a	Non-album singles
"I Wish It Were You" (Kriesha Chu feat. Junhyung)	2017	—	—N/a	Kriesha Chu
"Mesmerised" (Sanchez feat. Junhyung)	2017	—	—N/a	Colour
"—" denotes releases that did not chart or were not released in that region.

=== Soundtrack appearances ===
Title	Year	Peak chart positions	Sales	Album
Title	Year	KOR	Sales	Album
"Past Days" (with BtoB & Ha Yeon-soo)	2013	56	KOR: 87,730	Monstar OST
"After Time Passes" (with BtoB)	2013	32	KOR: 125,359	Monstar OST
"Don't Make Me Cry" (with Ha Yeon-soo, Kang Ha-neul, Kang Eui-sik, Dahee, Kim Min-young & Park Kyu-sun)	2013	—	—N/a	Monstar OST
"First Love" (with BtoB)	2013	61	KOR: 36,395	Monstar OST
"Only That Is My World / March" (with Ha Yeon-soo, Kang Ha-neul, Kang Eui-sik, Dahee, Kim Min-young & Park Kyu-sun)	2013	—	—N/a	Monstar OST
"Nightmare" (with Gayoon)	2015	61	KOR: 43,772	Yong-pal OST
"Don't Hesitate"	2018	—	—N/a	Encounter OST
"—" denotes releases that did not chart or were not released in that region.

== Other charted songs ==
Title	Year	Peak chart positions	Sales	Album
Title	Year	KOR	Sales	Album
"Caffeine (Piano version)" (ft. Yang Yo-seob)	2013	70	KOR: 26,522	Flower
"Anything" (ft. G.NA)	2013	79	KOR: 23,197	Flower
"Slow"	2013	87	—N/a	Flower
"Found You"	2016	72	KOR: 33,125	Highlight
"Too Much Love Kills Me"	2017	95	KOR: 21,589	Non-album single

== Music videos ==
Year	Title	Length
2013	"Flower"	3:21
2017	"Wonder If"	3:14
2018	"Sudden Shower"	3:25
2018	"Go Away"	3:32
2022	"Koong"	3:15
