= Living Without You =

Living Without You may refer to

- "Living Without You" (Sandy Mölling song), 2006
- "Living Without You" (Tulisa song), 2015
- "Living Without You", a song by Mel C, a B-side of the single "Here It Comes Again", 2003
- "Living Without You", a song by Monarchy, 2014
- "Living Without You", a song by Morandi, 2014
- "Living Without You", a song by Randy Newman from Randy Newman, 1968
- "Living Without You", a song by Russ Ballard, 1984
- "Living Without You", a song by Shotgun Messiah from Second Coming, 1991
- "Living Without You", a song by Weezer from Maladroit, 2002
- "Living Without You", a song by Yong Jun-hyung, 2012
- "Shock (Living Without You)", a song by Cartman from Go!, 2002
- ”Living Without You” a song by Sigala, David Guetta, and Sam Ryder, 2022
