= Baeksang Arts Award for Best New Director – Television =

- Country: South Korea
- Presented by: Baeksang Arts Awards
- Final award: 2011
- Website: Baeksang Arts Awards

The Baeksang Arts Award for Best New Director – Television (Korean: 백상예술대상 TV부문 신인 연출상; RR: Baeksang Yesul Daesang TV Bumun Sinin Yeonchulsang) was annually presented at the Baeksang Arts Awards ceremony.

== List of winners ==
#	Year	Director	Drama	Network
11	1975	Shim Hyun-woo	Art Theater	TBC
12	1976	Rsv Hong-jong	Some Korean Person	KBS
24	1988	Lee Seung-ryul	Under the Same Roof	MBC
25	1989	Yoon Hong-shik	Do You Know Mellakong?	KBS
26	1990	Kim Hyun-joon	Half Failure	KBS
27	1991	Lee Jin-seok	Our Paradise	MBC
28	1992	Kim Jong-shik	The Thief's Wife	KBS
29	1993	Kim Yong-gyu	TV's The Art of War	KBS
30	1994	Oh Jong-rok	Marriage	SBS
31	1995	Lee Joo-hwan	General Hospital	MBC
32	1996	Jeon San	Our Sunny Days of Youth	KBS
34	1998	Lee Chang-soon	Cinderella	MBC
35	1999	Pyo Min-soo	Lie	KBS
36	2000	Lee Hyun-jik	Butcher's Daughter	SBS
37	2001	Lee Kyo-wook	Indie Drama: Double Feature	KBS
38	2002	Kim Min-sik	New Nonstop	MBC
39	2003	Lee Geon-joon	Loving You	KBS
40	2004	Lee Jae-kyoo	Damo	MBC
41	2005	Kim Jin-man	Ireland	MBC
42	2006	Kim Kyu-tae	A Love to Kill	KBS
43	2007	Kim Hyung-shik	Surgeon Bong Dal-hee	SBS
44	2008	Lee Yoon-jung	Coffee Prince	MBC
45	2009	Boo Sung-chul	Star's Lover	SBS
46	2010	Yoo Hyun-ki	Master of Study	KBS
47	2011	Kim Won-seok	Sungkyunkwan Scandal	KBS
Discontinued

== Sources ==
- "Baeksang Arts Awards Nominees and Winners Lists". Naver Movie (in Korean).
- "Baeksang Arts Awards Winners Lists". Baeksang Arts Awards (in Korean).
