= Ilgan Sports =

South Korean daily newspaper

- Type: Daily newspaper
- Format: Broadsheet
- Publisher: eDaily (KG Group)
- Language: Korean
- Headquarters: Seoul
- Country: South Korea
- Website: isplus.com

Korean name
- Hangul: 일간스포츠
- Lit.: The Daily Sports
- RR: Ilgan seupocheu
- MR: Ilgan sŭp'och'ŭ

Ilgan Sports (Korean: 일간스포츠; lit. 'The Daily Sports'), sometimes abbreviated as 1S, is a South Korean daily sports and entertainment newspaper founded in 1969. Formerly under Hankook Ilbo from its 1961 launch to 2005 and the JoongAng Media Network from 2005 to 2022, it is currently owned by eDaily, a subsidiary of KG Group.

== History ==
- September 1969 - Ilgan Sports was launched as a sister newspaper of Hankook Ilbo.
- March 1970 - The newspaper exceeded 43,000 copies sold.
- May 2001 - Ilgan Sports signed a partnership agreement with Japan's Hochi Shimbun (now Sports Hochi).
- July 2001 - It joined the KOSDAQ.
- December 2005 - JoongAng Ilbo acquired Ilgan Sports.
- April 2006 - The newspaper used its shortened name 1S for the first time, and incorporated it in its logo.
- May 2010 - The newspaper's headquarters was relocated to the JoongAng Media Building in Seoul, sharing one place with JoongAng Ilbo.
- December 2015 - JTBC Plus takes over as publisher of Ilgan Sports.
- April 2022 - JTBC Plus sold Ilgan Sports to the KG Group.
