= Sungkyunkwan Scandal =

2010 South Korean TV series

- Promotional poster
- Hangul: 성균관 스캔들
- Hanja: 成均館 스캔들
- RR: Seonggyungwan seukaendeul
- MR: Sŏnggyun'gwan sŭk'aendŭl
- Genre: Historical; Coming-of-age; Romantic-comedy
- Based on: The Lives of Sungkyunkwan Confucian Scholars by Jung Eun-gwol
- Written by: Kim Tae-hee
- Directed by: Kim Won-seok; Hwang In-hyuk
- Starring: Park Yoo-chun; Park Min-young; Song Joong-ki; Yoo Ah-in
- Theme music composer: Eom Gi-yeob
- Country of origin: South Korea
- Original language: Korean
- No. of episodes: 20

Production
- Executive producers: Kwak Ki-won; Kim Dong-rae; Baek Chang-joo
- Producer: Yoo Gun-shik
- Cinematography: Kim Seung-ho; Min Myung-woo
- Editors: Lee Hyun-mi; Lee Young-rim
- Production companies: Raemongraein; C-JeS Entertainment

Original release
- Network: KBS2
- Release: 30 August – 2 November 2010

Sungkyunkwan Scandal (Korean: 성균관 스캔들) is a South Korean historical drama starring Park Yoo-chun, Park Min-young, Song Joong-ki, and Yoo Ah-in. Directed by Kim Won-seok and written by Kim Tae-hee, it is based on Jung Eun-gwol's bestselling 2007 novel The Lives of Sungkyunkwan Confucian Scholars. It aired on KBS2 from August 30 to November 2, 2010 on Mondays and Tuesdays at 21:55 for 20 episodes.

== Synopsis ==
In order to support her family during a time when society forbids women from obtaining an education or finding employment, Kim Yoon-hee poses as her brother, Kim Yoon-shik. After doing a number of odd jobs, mostly at a nearby bookshop, she is given the opportunity to boost her income by taking the entrance exam at Sungkyunkwan, Joseon's top university, as a substitute. Sungkyunkwan is a place of Confucian learning where students and teachers learn from each other, causing radical changes in their thinking, and so sacred a place that even royal guards may not enter. She is apprehended by the moral Lee Sun-joon, who subsequently recognizes Yoon-hee's abilities and even urges her to apply to the university.

While trying to contain her developing feelings for Lee Sun-joon, Kim Yoon-hee she must deal with the unending mischief of upperclassman Gu Yong-ha, tolerate the mood swings of her rebellious roommate Moon Jae-shin, stay out of trouble with the strict student body president Ha In-soo, and keep her secret hidden. The "Jalgeum Quartet" consists of Moon, Gu, Lee, and Kim together. The drama takes place during King Jeongjo's reign, during which he enlists the quartet to help him deal with the intrigues of the court. The Geumdeung document is the subject of the last episodes.

== Cast ==
=== Main ===
- Park Yoo-chun as Yi Seon-jun, nicknamed "Ga-rang"
- Park Min-young as Kim Yun-hee (when girl)/Kim Yoon-shik (when boy), nicknamed "Dae-mul"
  - Bang Jun-seo as young Kim Yunhee
- Song Joong-ki as Gu Yong-ha, nicknamed "Yeo-rim"
- Yoo Ah-in as Mun Jae-sin, nicknamed "Geol-o"

=== Supporting ===
- Jun Tae-soo as Ha In-su
- Seo Hyo-rim as Ha Hyo-eun
- Kim Min-seo as Jo-seon
- Ahn Nae-sang as Jeong Yak-yong
- Jo Sung-ha as King Jeongjo of Joseon
- Kim Kap-soo as Yi Jeong-mu, second state councillor and Seon-jun's father
- Lee Jae-yong as Ha U-gyu, minister of military affairs and In-su's father

=== Extended ===
- Kang Sung-pil as Im Byung-choon
- Ji Nam-hyuk as Seol Go-bong
- Chae Byung-chan as Kang-moo
- Kim Ik-tae as Chae Je-gong, chief state councillor
- Choi Dong-joon as Moon Geun-soo, minister of Saheonbu and Jae-shin's Father
- Kim Kwang-kyu as Hwang-ga
- Kim Ha-kyoon as Choi Shin-mook
- Park Geun-soo as Yoo Chang-ik
- Kim Young-bae as Go Jang-bok
- Kim Jung-kyoon as Ahn Do-hyun
- Jang Se-hyun as Kim Woo-tak
- Hwang Chan-woo as Bae Hae-won
- Im Young-pil as Ham Choon-ho
- Joo Ah-sung as Nam Myung-shik
- Kim Mi-kyung as Ms. Jo, Yoon-hee's mother
- Ha Min-jae as Kim Yoon Shik, Yoon-hee' younger brother
- Ryu Dam as Soon-dol
- Sung Hyun-joo as Beo-deul
- Im Yoon-jung as Aeng-aeng
- Jung Hye-mi as Seom-seom
- Park Dong-bin as Woo-kyu's steward
- Jo Yi-sam as Soron Yusaeng
- Bae Jae-ho as Soron Yusaeng
- Eom Bo-yong as Cheon-dong
- Kim Dan-yool as Bok-dong
- Lee Tae-ri (Note: Credited as Lee Min-ho.) as Bok-soo, Bok-dong's elder brother
- Oh Na-mi as Mi-hyun, Hyo-eun's friend
- Ahn Nam-hee as Jung-hyun, Hyo-eun's friend
- Nam Myung-ryul as Kim Seung-heon, Yoon-hee's Father

=== Cameos ===
- Lee In as Park Dal-jae (episode 1)
- Lee Won-jong as Shaman (episode 8)
- Park Chul-min as Yoon Hyung-gu (episode 9, 17~18)
- Ki Im-beom as Song Yong-tae (episode 9~10)
- Lee Dal-hyung as Yong-ha's father (episode 17~18)

== Reception ==
The series attracted a fervent fanbase that belied its modest mid-teen ratings. Its cult popularity was manifested in the very high online activity on the message boards of its official website and in popular portal DC Inside, the number of episode viewings on the KBS website, as well as units of DVDs and OST albums sold. The original soundtrack, which featured Park Yoo-chun's band JYJ, sold 110,000 copies in a couple of weeks. The old campus of Sungkyunkwan University (SKKU) was the setting for the fusion historical drama, which also starred alumnus Song Joong-ki, resulting in increased interest in SKKU from international audiences who watched the drama.

== Ratings ==
Episode #	Original broadcast date	Average audience share			
Episode #	Original broadcast date	TNmS Ratings		AGB Nielsen	
Episode #	Original broadcast date	Nationwide	Seoul National Capital Area	Nationwide	Seoul National Capital Area
1	30 August 2010	7.7%	8.6%	6.3%	8.7%
2	31 August 2010	7.2%	8.2%	6.3%	9.0%
3	6 September 2010	8.0%	8.1%	7.3%	9.3%
4	7 September 2010	7.6%	8.0%	7.5%	8.8%
5	13 September 2010	7.8%	8.1%	8.0%	9.5%
6	14 September 2010	8.0%	7.8%	8.4%	8.4%
7	20 September 2010	9.7%	9.0%	8.7%	9.0%
8	21 September 2010	8.2%	8.2%	7.9%	9.5%
9	27 September 2010	9.8%	9.2%	9.2%	9.6%
10	28 September 2010	10.1%	9.3%	10.2%	10.6%
11	4 October 2010	9.2%	8.8%	10.4%	10.5%
12	5 October 2010	9.9%	9.7%	10.7%	11.1%
13	11 October 2010	11.2%	11.1%	12.8%	13.1%
14	12 October 2010	10.3%	10.1%	10.9%	10.9%
15	18 October 2010	13.0%	13.0%	13.1%	14.0%
16	19 October 2010	13.7%	13.7%	14.3%	15.1%
17	25 October 2010	12.9%	13.1%	13.0%	13.9%
18	26 October 2010	12.0%	11.9%	12.6%	13.4%
19	1 November 2010	12.5%	12.2%	11.8%	12.6%
20	2 November 2010	13.3%	13.2%	12.8%	13.4%
Average		10.1%	-	10.1%	-

== Awards and nominations ==
Year	Award	Category	Recipient	Result	Ref.
2010	KBS Drama Awards	Top Excellence Award, Actor	Kim Kap-soo	Won	
2010	KBS Drama Awards	Excellence Award, Actor in a Mid-length Drama	Song Joong-ki	Nominated	
2010	KBS Drama Awards	Excellence Award, Actress in a Mid-length Drama	Park Min-young	Won	
2010	KBS Drama Awards	Best New Actor	Park Yoochun	Won	
2010	KBS Drama Awards	Best New Actor	Yoo Ah-in	Nominated	
2010	KBS Drama Awards	Netizens' Award, Actor	Park Yoochun	Won	
2010	KBS Drama Awards	Netizens' Award, Actor	Song Joong-ki	Nominated	
2010	KBS Drama Awards	Netizens' Award, Actor	Yoo Ah-in	Nominated	
2010	KBS Drama Awards	Netizens' Award, Actress	Park Min-young	Won	
2010	KBS Drama Awards	Popularity Award, Actor	Song Joong-ki	Won	
2010	KBS Drama Awards	Best Couple Award	Park Yoochun and Park Min-young	Won	
2010	KBS Drama Awards	Best Couple Award	Yoo Ah-in and Song Joong-ki	Won	
2011	47th Baeksang Arts Awards	Best Drama	Sungkyunkwan Scandal	Nominated	
2011	47th Baeksang Arts Awards	Best Actress (TV)	Park Min-young	Nominated	
2011	47th Baeksang Arts Awards	Best New Director (TV)	Kim Won-seok	Won	
2011	47th Baeksang Arts Awards	Best New Actor (TV)	Park Yoochun	Won	
2011	47th Baeksang Arts Awards	Most Popular Actor (TV)	Park Yoochun	Won	
2011	6th Seoul International Drama Awards	Outstanding Korean Drama	Sungkyunkwan Scandal	Won	
2011	6th Seoul International Drama Awards	Outstanding Korean Actor	Park Yoochun	Won	
2011	6th Seoul International Drama Awards	Outstanding Korean Actress	Park Min-young	Nominated	
2011	6th Seoul International Drama Awards	Outstanding Korean Drama OST	"Found You" - JYJ	Nominated	
2011	6th Seoul International Drama Awards	People's Choice Award	Park Yoochun	Won	
2011	4th Korea Drama Awards	Best Drama	Sungkyunkwan Scandal	Nominated	
2011	4th Korea Drama Awards	Best Director	Kim Won-seok	Won	
2011	4th Korea Drama Awards	Best Actress	Park Min-young	Nominated	
2011	4th Korea Drama Awards	Best New Actor	Park Yoochun	Nominated	
2011	4th Korea Drama Awards	Best New Actor	Song Joong-ki	Nominated	
2011	4th Korea Drama Awards	Best New Actress	Kim Min-seo	Nominated	
2011	38th Korea Broadcasting Awards	Best Mid-length Drama	Sungkyunkwan Scandal	Won	
2012	55th New York Festivals International; Television & Film Awards	Bronze World Medal for Best Miniseries	Sungkyunkwan Scandal	Won	

== Theatrical versions ==
The series was edited into a theatrical version which screened in Japanese cinemas from May 6–19, 2011 as part of the "Dokimeki☆Ikemen Festival."

For the drama's first anniversary, Korean cable channel QTV (a joint venture between Turner Broadcasting System and JoongAng Ilbo's affiliate, IS Plus) re-edited the series into a two-hour TV movie which aired on September 10, 2011.
