= 6th Korea Drama Awards =

2013 edition of award ceremony

- Date: October 2, 2013
- Site: Kyungnam Culture and Arts Center, Jinju, South Gyeongsang Province
- Hosted by: Subin; Oh Sang-jin

The 6th Korea Drama Awards is an awards ceremony for excellence in television in South Korea. It was held at the Grand Performance Hall – Kyungnam Culture and Arts Center in Jinju, South Gyeongsang Province on October 2, 2013 and hosted by Dal Shabet's Subin and announcer Oh Sang-jin. The nominees were chosen from Korean dramas that aired from September 2012 to August 2013.

== Nominations and winners ==
(Winners denoted in bold)

Grand Prize (Daesang)	Best Drama
**Lee Bo-young** - **I Can Hear Your Voice**, **Seoyoung, My Daughter**; Go Hyun-jung - The Queen's Classroom; Kim Hye-soo - The Queen of Office; Lee Jin-wook - Nine; Song Hye-kyo - That Winter, the Wind Blows	**Seoyoung, My Daughter (KBS2)**; Childless Comfort (JTBC); Good Doctor (KBS2); I Can Hear Your Voice (SBS); The Queen of Office (KBS2)
Best Production Director	Best Screenplay
**Jo Soo-won** - **I Can Hear Your Voice**; Jeon Chang-geun - The Queen of Office; Joo Sung-woo - A Hundred Year Legacy; Kim Byung-soo - Nine; Kim Kyu-tae - That Winter, the Wind Blows; Shin Woo-chul - Gu Family Book	**Park Jae-beom** - **Good Doctor**; Kim Soo-hyun - Childless Comfort; Noh Hee-kyung - That Winter, the Wind Blows; Park Hye-ryun - I Can Hear Your Voice; So Hyun-kyung - Seoyoung, My Daughter
Top Excellence Award, Actor	Top Excellence Award, Actress
**Jung Woong-in** - **I Can Hear Your Voice**; **Lee Jung-jin** - **A Hundred Year Legacy**; Joo Won - Good Doctor; Joo Sang-wook - Good Doctor; Lee Seung-gi - Gu Family Book	**Jo Yoon-hee** - **Nine**; Gong Hyo-jin - Master's Sun; Lee Mi-sook - You Are the Best!; Lee Yo-won - Empire of Gold; Moon Chae-won - Good Doctor
Excellence Award, Actor	Excellence Award, Actress
**Lee Jong-suk** - **I Can Hear Your Voice**; **Kim Dong-wan** - **Cheer Up, Mr. Kim!**; Kim Kwang-kyu - The Queen of Office; Lee Sang-yoon - Seoyoung, My Daughter, Goddess of Fire; Yeon Woo-jin - When a Man Falls in Love	**Seo Hyun-jin** - **Here Comes Mr. Oh, Goddess of Fire**; Bae Suzy - Gu Family Book; Eugene - A Hundred Year Legacy; IU - You Are the Best!; Lee Da-hee - I Can Hear Your Voice; Soo Ae - King of Ambition
Best New Actor	Best New Actress
**Park Seo-joon** - **Pots of Gold**; **Yong Jun-hyung** - **Monstar**; Kim Woo-bin - School 2013; Lee Jung-shin - Seoyoung, My Daughter; Yoon Doo-joon - Iris II: New Generation	**BoA** - **Waiting for Love**; Choi Soo-young - Dating Agency: Cyrano; Ha Yeon-soo - Monstar; Kim Ga-eun - I Can Hear Your Voice; Kyung Soo-jin - Eunhui, Don't Look Back: The Legend of Orpheus; Son Na-eun - Childless Comfort
Best Young Actor/Actress	Best Couple Award
**Kal So-won** - **The Secret of Birth**; Kim Hyang-gi - The Queen's Classroom; Kim Myung-soo - Master's Sun; Kim Sae-ron - The Queen's Classroom	**Lee Jong-suk** and **Lee Bo-young** - **I Can Hear Your Voice**; Lee Jin-wook and Jo Yoon-hee - Nine; Lee Seung-gi and Bae Suzy - Gu Family Book; Yong Jun-hyung and Ha Yeon-soo - Monstar
Best Original Soundtrack	Hot Star Award
**"Only You" (4Men)** - **Gu Family Book**	**Clara** - **Goddess of Marriage**
