= Hollys =

South Korean coffee company

KG Hollys F&B Co., Ltd
- Formerly: Hollys F&B Co., Ltd
- Company type: Subsidiary
- Industry: Lifestyle
- Founded: 1998; 28 years ago
- Headquarters: Jung District, Seoul, South Korea
- Area served: South Korea, Peru, Philippines, United States, Malaysia, China, Thailand, Vietnam
- Key people: Shin Yoo-jeong (CEO)
- Products: Coffee, baked goods
- Parent: KG Inicis (KG Group)
- Website: Official website

KG Hollys F&B Co., Ltd, trading as Hollys (Korean: 할리스; RR: Halliseu) and known until March 2021 as Hollys Coffee (할리스 커피; Halliseu keopi), is a South Korean lifestyle and specialty coffee company part of the KG Group. The company was established in 1998 and opened South Korea's first espresso shop that year. Its shops offer espresso, coffee, tea, specialty coffee- and tea-based hot and cold drinks, a variety of pastries and other snacks and coffee supplies. By 2008 there were more than 100 Hollys Coffee shops in the country, and the franchise had expanded with additional stores in China, Thailand, Vietnam and Malaysia.

== History ==
Hollys Coffee opened its first store in May 1998 in Gangnam District, Seoul. It expanded rapidly and opened its 100th store in May 2006 in Gangnam station. Its first international store was in the US and opened April 2008 in Los Angeles. It opened its 200th store in May 2009. The Hollys Coffee Academy was opened in April 2011. Continuing to expand overseas its first store in the Philippines was opened in July 2011, the first store in China was opened in July 2012 in Shenzhen. and its first store in Thailand opened in 2013 in Bangkok

In October 2020, KG Inicis (a KG Group affiliate) through a special purpose company, Crown F&B, acquired a 93.8% stake in Hollys F&B (the Hollys Coffee company) from IMM Private Equity, a private equity fund manager.

In March 2021, the company removed "Coffee" from its trade name and relaunched it as a "lifestyle brand". A revised logo and a new slogan were also introduced.

== See also ==
- Coffeehouse
- List of coffeehouse chains
