= KG Steel =

South Korean metals company

KG Steel Co., Ltd.
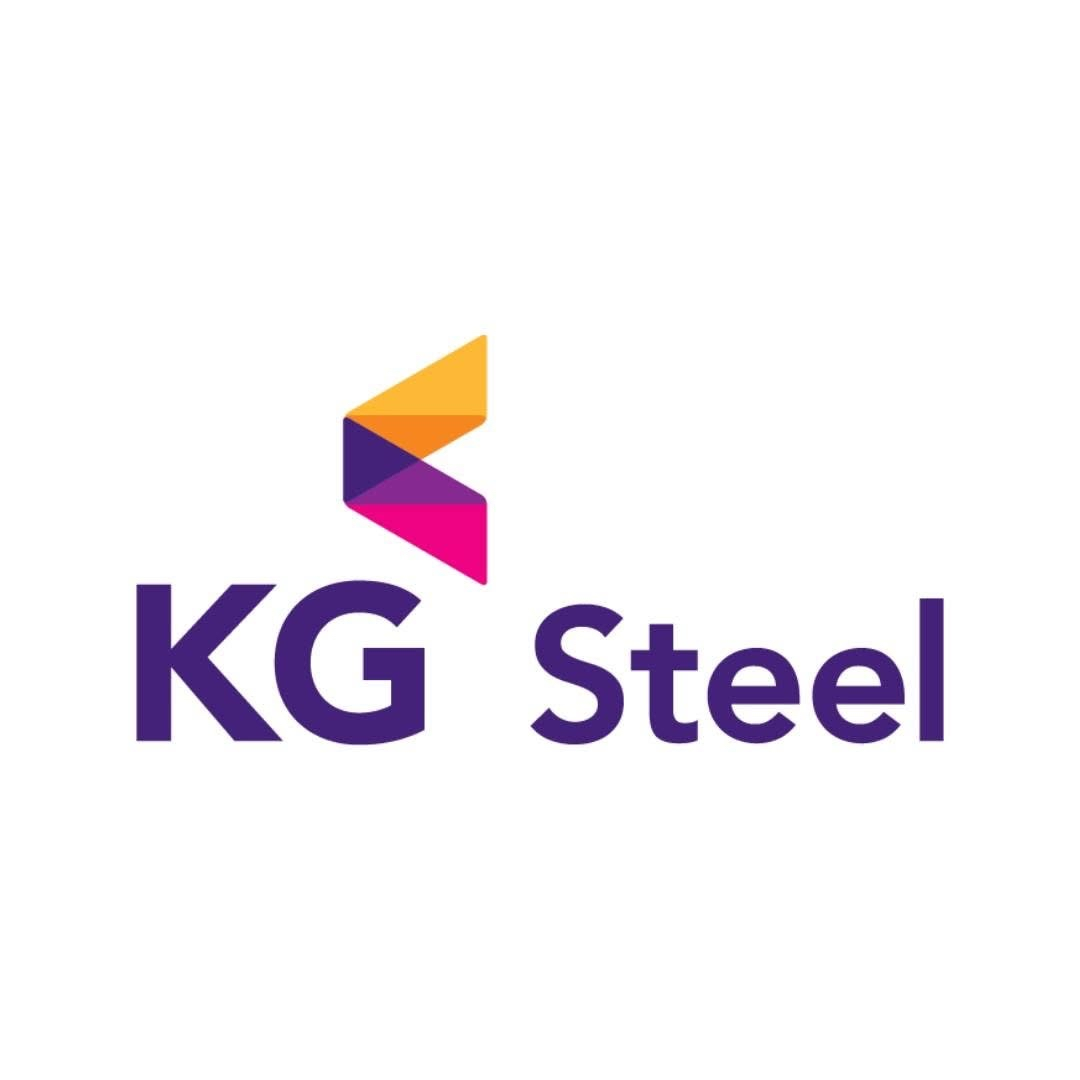
- Native name: KG스틸 주식회사
- Formerly: Dongbu Steel (1985-2020); KG Dongbu Steel (2020-2022)
- Company type: Public
- Traded as: KRX: 016380
- Industry: Steel
- Founded: October 27, 1982; 43 years ago
- Headquarters: Seoul, South Korea
- Key people: Park Sung-hee (CEO)
- Products: Steel Cold-Rolled, steel sheet, steel and iron coating
- Parent: KG Group
- Website: www.kg-steel.co.kr

KG Steel Co., Ltd. (Korean: KG스틸 주식회사) is a South Korean multinational corporation that produces steel-related and cold-rolled products.

== History ==
In 2013, the Korea Development Bank attempted to restructure the Dongbu Group, but its attempts resulting in slumping business. Dongbu Steel reached an agreement with creditors to undergo a debt workout program. Creditors tried to support Dongbu Steel with a variety of measures such as 600 billion won in support. The creditors then attempted to sell Dongbu Steel, but had trouble finding bidders. Dongbu Steel then sold off an electric furnace used for steel production. In May 2016, Dongbu Steel was taken off sale. In 2019, the company was acquired by a consortium led by KG Group companies and Cactus Private Equity.
