= Kang Eui-sik =

South Korean actor

- Born: March 15, 1988 (age 38); Yangpyeong County, Gyeonggi Province, South Korea
- Education: Hongik University - Business Administration; Dongguk University - Theater
- Occupation: Actor
- Years active: 2012–present

Korean name
- Hangul: 강의식
- Hanja: 姜義植
- RR: Gang Uisik
- MR: Kang Ŭisik

Kang Eui-sik (born March 15, 1988) is a South Korean actor.

== Filmography ==
=== Television series ===
Year	Title	Role	Network
2013	Monstar	Park Kyu-dong	Mnet
2013	The Eldest	Kim Young-doo	jTBC
2014	KBS Drama Special – "Pitch Black"	Jeong Woo-min	KBS2
2014	Misaeng: Incomplete Life	Intern worker	tvN
2015	Blood	Lee Seong-kyun	KBS2
2015	Hello Monster	Seung Min-yeok	KBS2
2016	Cinderella with Four Knights	Kang Hyun-min's friend	tvN
2016	Dr. Romantic	Deserter	SBS
2016	A Beautiful Mind	Doctor in the countryside clinic	KBS2

== Theater ==
Year	Title	Role
2012	Hwarang	Mu-gwan-rang

== Discography ==
Year	Title	Notes
2013	"Don't Make Me Cry"	track from Monstar OST
2013	"To You Who Hopes for My Despair"	track from Monstar OST
2013	"Only That Is My World / March"	track from Monstar OST
