= Yoon Tae-ho =

South Korean manhwa artist (born 1969)

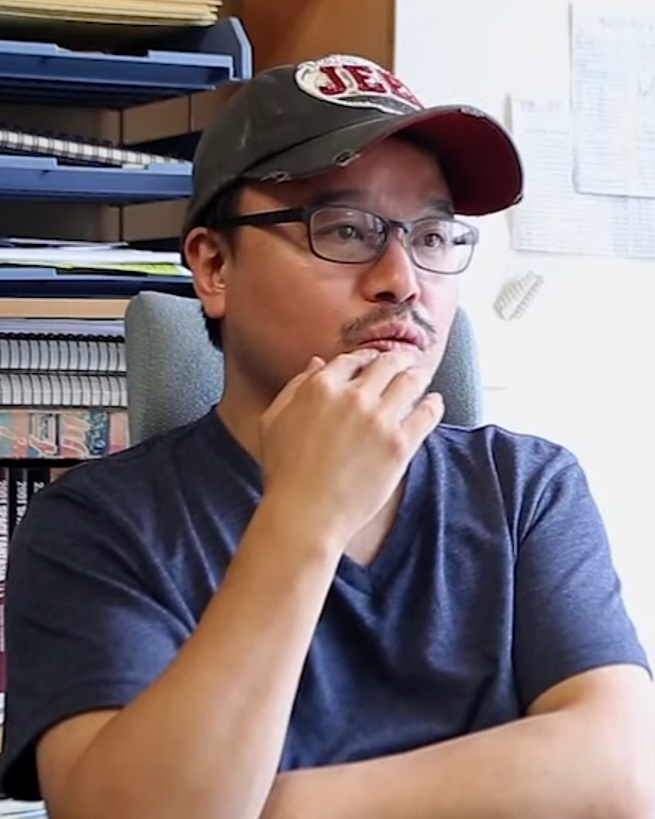
- Born: September 27, 1969 (age 57); Gwangju, South Jeolla Province, South Korea
- Occupation: Manhwa artist
- Years active: 1993–present
- Agent: Nulook Media

Korean name
- Hangul: 윤태호
- Hanja: 尹胎鎬
- RR: Yun Taeho
- MR: Yun T'aeho

Yoon Tae-ho (Korean: 윤태호; born September 27, 1969) is a South Korean manhwa artist. He is best known for writing the webtoons Moss and Misaeng.

== Early life ==
Yoon Tae-ho grew up in a rural town of Gwangju, South Jeolla Province. He came from a poor family with an abusive, strict father, and Yoon suffered from the skin disease eczema which severely affected his self-esteem as a child.

Transferring schools frequently due to his father's ups and downs in business, Yoon didn't have many friends. Drawing was his outlet to escape from reality, and he began at a young age, with a four-frame comic strip in the newspaper of his elementary school in Gunsan, North Jeolla Province. His single-mindedness about art won him special treatment from his teachers, who would sometimes allow him to paint watercolors instead of finishing his homework.

== Career ==
When he was not accepted by the university he applied for and with his family circumstances showing no signs of improving, Yoon moved to Seoul at the age of 19 to pursue his dream of becoming an artist. Since he did not know anyone in the city, at first he was homeless for a while. He then met renowned manhwa artist Huh Young-man, and when he learned that Huh lived on the street close to where he was staying, Yoon hounded him until he was finally accepted as Huh's pupil and assistant in 1988. He also became an assistant to cartoonist Jo Woon-hak.

Yoon described himself as an angry man during his twenties, always getting into fights with strangers whom he assumed looked down on him for his small physique. But his new job filled him with hope and passion, and he spent all of his free time at night practicing drawing. He was rejected eight times by publishers, before making his writing debut in 1993 with Emergency Landing (Korean: 비상착륙), a serial comic published in the magazine, Monthly Jump (Korean: 점프). His own worst critic, he later derided his first work, "The story was terrible and the drawings were too showy." So he put more emphasis on storylines rather than the details of the drawings, with the goal of reflecting the spirit of an era.

Yoon became best known for writing the webtoons Moss (Korean: 이끼; RR: Ikki) and Misaeng (Korean: 미생), leading literary critics to call him as one of the leading voices of the next generation of Korean cartoonists.

Anchored in a classic murder mystery, Moss tells the story of one man's journey into the heart of darkness in a small town deep in the backwoods of the Korean countryside to uncover the truth behind his father's death. With twists and turns seemingly inspired by American southern gothic literature, the 80-part graphic novel was published online from 2008 to 2009, and it became an internet sensation. Readers praised the labyrinthine "whodunit" plot which was accentuated by the richly detailed illustrations of the decaying village that gave it an ambiance of dread, as well as its subtext of social commentary. In 2010, it was adapted into the film Moss starring Park Hae-il and Jung Jae-young and directed by Kang Woo-suk. It drew more than 3.4 million moviegoers, becoming the top grosser among webtoon-based films.

Misaeng, which means "an incomplete life," ran from 2012 to 2013 online and drew one billion hits; it was also published in paperback form in nine volumes and sold 900,000 copies. After failing to become a professional baduk player, the protagonist Jang Geu-rae takes a job as an intern at a Korean corporation, and the compelling narrative follows flawed and layered characters as they deal with the fierce competition for survival, claustrophobic work relationships and office politics. Yoon used the game of baduk as a metaphor for the cutthroat trading industry culture, and his painstaking research of the realities at trading companies provide a vivid description of life as a corporate underling. Misaeng gained immense popularity among white-collar workers in Korea and is considered a must-read comic in the country. In 2013, six 10-minute mobile short films were shown on internet portal Daum, with each short focusing on the six main characters of Misaeng (Im Si-wan played Jang Geu-rae) but the storylines are prequels to the comic instead of a direct adaptation. Directed by Son Tae-gyum and Kim Tae-hui, these shorts were later compiled into the omnibus film titled Incomplete Life: Prequel (Korean: 미생 프리퀄), which screened at the Puchon International Fantastic Film Festival. Yim later reprised his role in the television series adaptation, also titled Misaeng. Directed by Kim Won-seok and written by Jung Yoon-jung, it was a ratings hit when it aired on cable channel tvN in 2014. With the TV series' popularity, Yoon confirmed that he will begin serializing a sequel to Misaeng in March 2015.

In March 2012, Yoon led several groups of cartoonists (from the Korea Cartoonists' Association, the Cartoon and Animation Society in Korea, the Corea Cartoon Art Association, Cartoon Boomer and the Korea Comic Writers Association) in protesting the plan of state censorship body Korea Communications Standards Commission to designate 23 webtoons as "harmful to youth," saying it undermines freedom of expression. Yoon said, "This is the sad reality of cartoons -- cartoons are praised and highlighted as a new cultural growth engine on the one hand, while they are the most frequently criticized contents for "harmfulness" on the other. The government hasn't taken much action on violence in other cultural genres, but has attacked cartoons only. With such repetitive attacks, we are losing our freedom to create."

In August 2013, Yoon launched A-Comics, a webzine specializing in comic books with content ranging from webtoons to mobile cartoons (regardless of origin), as well as reviews, recommendations, and interviews with cartoonists. Yoon said, "For a specific cultural genre to prosper, it is important for writers to come up with a good work, but at the same time a medium that bridges creators and consumers is very crucial. I hope A-Comics revitalizes the Korean comic book scene."

In 2014, Lee Byung-hun and Cho Seung-woo were cast in Inside Men (Korean: 내부자들; RR: Naebujadeul), an upcoming film adaptation directed by Woo Min-ho based on Yoon's 2010 webtoon The Insiders. Lee plays Sang-goo, a shady hoodlum who operates within the halls of powers, doing dirty work for crooked politicians. When the tables are turned against him, he sets out to get his revenge.

== Works ==
- Emergency Landing (비상착륙, 1993)
- 혼자사는 남편 (1996)
- 춘향별곡 (1997)
- Yahoo (야후, 1998)
- 수상한 아이들 (1999)
- Romance (로망스, 2001)
- Moss (이끼, 2008–2009)
- 열풍학원 (2009)
- 당신은 거기 있었다 (2009)
- 주유천하 (2009) (written by Lee Won-ho, illustrated by Yoon Tae-ho)
- The Insiders (내부자들, 2010–present)
- Misaeng (미생, 2012–2013)
- Operation Chromite (인천상륙작전, 2013–present)

== Screen adaptations ==
- Moss (2010)
- Incomplete Life: Prequel (2013)
- Misaeng (2014)
- Inside Men (2015)
- Ordinary Glory (2020)

== Awards ==
- 1999 Ministry of Culture and Tourism: Our Manhwa of Today (Yahoo)
- 2002 Korean Publication of Manhwa Awards: Best New Artist (Romance)
- 2007 Korean Publication of Manhwa Awards: Excellence Award (Moss)
- 2008 Bucheon Manhwa Awards: General Comic Award (Moss)
- 2010 Korea Content Awards: Presidential Award, Manhwa category

=== State honors ===
Name of country, year given, and name of honor
Country	Year	Honor	Ref.
South Korea (Note: Honors are given at the Korean Popular Culture and Arts Awards, arranged by the Korea Creative Content Agency and hosted by the Ministry of Culture, Sports and Tourism. They are awarded to those who have contributed to the arts and South Korea's pop culture.)	2010	Minister of Culture, Sports and Tourism Commendation	
