= Jung Eun-gwol =

South Korean novelist

- Occupation: Novelist
- Writing career
- Pen name: Blue Flower
- Language: Korean
- Genres: Historical; Romance

Korean name
- Hangul: 정은궐
- Hanja: 鄭銀闕
- RR: Jeong Eungwol
- MR: Chŏng Ŭn'gwŏl

Jung Eun-gwol (Korean: 정은궐) is a South Korean novelist. Three of her bestselling books have been adapted into television dramas – Sungkyunkwan Scandal (KBS2, 2010) and Moon Embracing the Sun (MBC, 2012) and Lovers of the Red Sky (SBS, 2021).

== Works ==
Year	Title	Volumes	Publisher	Adaptation	Notes
2004	그녀의 맞선 보고서	2	Maeumjari		Written under the pen name 블루플라워 ("Blue Flower")
2005	The Moon that Embraces the Sun	2	YP Books; Paran Media	Moon Embracing the Sun (MBC, 2012)	Revised in 2011
2007	The Lives of Sungkyunkwan Confucian Scholars	2	Paran Media	Sungkyunkwan Scandal (KBS2, 2010)	Revised in 2009
2009	규장각 각신들의 나날	2	Paran Media		
2016	Hong Chun-gi	2	Paran Media	Lovers of the Red Sky (SBS, 2021)	
