= Baeksang Arts Awards =

South Korean film, television and theatre awards

- Previous: 62nd Baeksang Arts Awards; May 8, 2026
- The Baeksang Arts Award statuette (since 2019)
- Awarded for: Excellence in film, television, theatre, and musical
- Sponsored by: Gucci (from 2022)
- Country: South Korea
- Presented by: Ilgan Sports (until 2021); JoongAng Group (from 2022)
- First award: January 18, 1965; 61 years ago
- Website: www.baeksangawards.co.kr

The Baeksang Arts Awards (Korean: 백상예술대상; Hanja: 百想藝術大賞), also known as the Paeksang Arts Awards, are awards for excellence in film, television and theatre in South Korea. The awards were introduced in 1965 by Chang Key-young, the founder of the newspaper Hankook Ilbo, whose art name was "Baeksang". It was established for the development of Korean popular culture and art and for enhancing the morale of artists. They are regarded as one of the most prestigious entertainment awards in South Korea.

Baeksang Arts Awards are annually presented at a ceremony organised by JoongAng Group in the second quarter of each year. Until 2021, it was organised by Ilgan Sports before its acquisition by eDaily, a subsidiary of KG Group. It is the only comprehensive awards ceremony in the country, recognising excellence in film, television and theatre.

== Current awards ==
=== Film ===
- Grand Prize
- Best Film
- Best Director
- Best New Director
- Best Screenplay
- Best Technical Achievement
- Best Actor
- Best Actress
- Best Supporting Actor
- Best Supporting Actress
- Best New Actor
- Best New Actress

=== Television ===
- Grand Prize
- Best Drama
- Best Entertainment Program
- Best Educational Show
- Best Director
- Best Screenplay
- Best Technical Achievement
- Best Actor
- Best Actress
- Best Supporting Actor
- Best Supporting Actress
- Best New Actor
- Best New Actress
- Best Male Variety Performer
- Best Female Variety Performer

=== Theatre ===
- Baeksang Theater
- Best Acting
- Best Newcomer

=== Musical ===
- Best Musical
- Creative Award
- Performance Award

=== Other ===
- Most Popular Actor
- Most Popular Actress

== Retired awards ==
- Best Original Soundtrack: 2014
- Best New Director – Television: 1988 to 2011
- Best New Variety Performer
- Most Popular Variety Performer

== Special awards ==
InStyle Fashion Award
| # | Year | Recipient |
|---|---|---|
| 42 | 2006 | Uhm Jung-hwa |
| 42 | 2006 | Lee Joon-gi |
| 46 | 2010 | Son Ye-jin |
| 47 | 2011 | Lee Min-jung |
| 50 | 2014 | Jun Ji-hyun |
| 50 | 2014 | Kim Hee-ae |
| 50 | 2014 | Yim Si-wan |
| 51 | 2015 | Lee Jung-jae |
| 51 | 2015 | Shin Min-a |
| 52 | 2016 | Park Bo-gum |
| 52 | 2016 | Bae Suzy |
| 53 | 2017 | Kim Ha-neul |

iQIYI Global Star Award
| # | Year | Recipient |
|---|---|---|
| 51 | 2015 | Lee Min-ho |
| 51 | 2015 | Park Shin-hye |
| 52 | 2016 | Song Joong-ki |
| 52 | 2016 | Song Hye-kyo |

Bazaar Icon Award
| # | Year | Recipient |
|---|---|---|
| 54 | 2018 | Nana |
| 55 | 2019 | Kim Hye-soo |
| 56 | 2020 | Seo Ji-hye |

Social Contribution Award
| # | Year | Recipient |
|---|---|---|
| 49 | 2013 | Ahn Sung-ki |

Lifetime Achievement Award
| # | Year | Recipient |
|---|---|---|
| 34 | 1998 | Jeon Taek-yi |
| 39 | 2003 | Lee Tae-won |
| 44 | 2008 | Song Hae |
| 45 | 2009 | Lee Soon-jae |
| 46 | 2010 | Bae Sam-ryong |
| 47 | 2011 | Shin Seong-il |
| 53 | 2017 | Kim Young-ae |

== Ceremonies ==
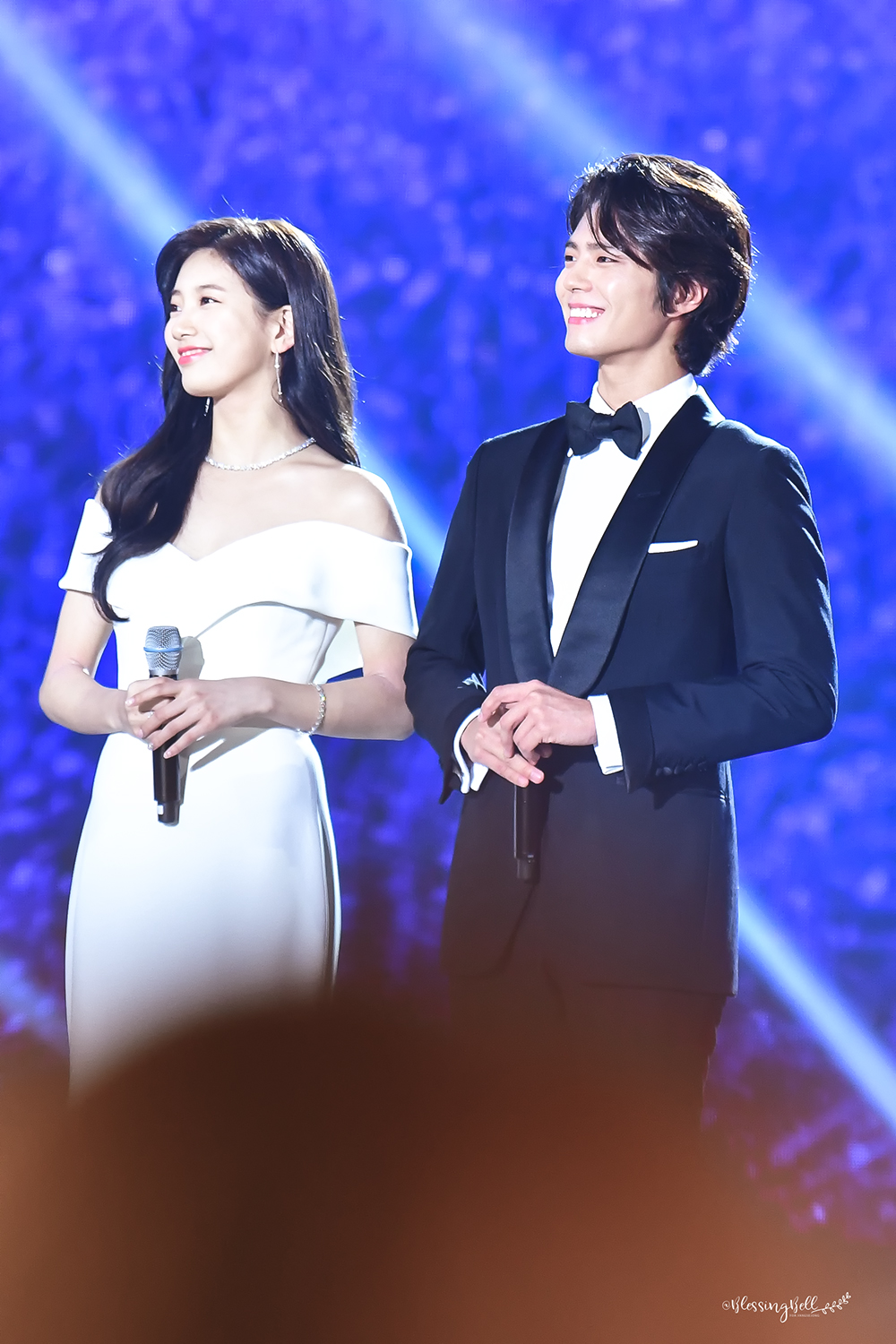
Longtime hosts Bae Suzy (L) and Park Bo-gum at the 54th Baeksang Arts Awards in 2018; Bae and Park have been called "Icon of Baeksang" and "Face of Baeksang" respectively.

| Edition | Date |
|---|---|
| 41st Baeksang Arts Awards | May 20, 2005 |
| 42nd Baeksang Arts Awards | April 14, 2006 |
| 43rd Baeksang Arts Awards | April 25, 2007 |
| 44th Baeksang Arts Awards | April 24, 2008 |
| 45th Baeksang Arts Awards | February 27, 2009 |
| 46th Baeksang Arts Awards | March 26, 2010 |
| 47th Baeksang Arts Awards | May 26, 2011 |
| 48th Baeksang Arts Awards | April 26, 2012 |
| 49th Baeksang Arts Awards | May 9, 2013 |
| 50th Baeksang Arts Awards | May 27, 2014 |
| 51st Baeksang Arts Awards | May 26, 2015 |
| 52nd Baeksang Arts Awards | June 3, 2016 |
| 53rd Baeksang Arts Awards | May 3, 2017 |
| 54th Baeksang Arts Awards | May 3, 2018 |
| 55th Baeksang Arts Awards | May 1, 2019 |
| 56th Baeksang Arts Awards | June 5, 2020 |
| 57th Baeksang Arts Awards | May 13, 2021 |
| 58th Baeksang Arts Awards | May 2, 2022 |
| 59th Baeksang Arts Awards | April 28, 2023 |
| 60th Baeksang Arts Awards | May 7, 2024 |
| 61st Baeksang Arts Awards | May 5, 2025 |
| 62nd Baeksang Arts Awards | May 8, 2026 |

== See also ==
- List of Asian television awards

== Sources ==
- "Baeksang Arts Awards Nominees and Winners Lists". Naver Movie (in Korean).
- "Baeksang Arts Awards Winners Lists". Baeksang Arts Awards (in Korean).
