= Misaeng: Incomplete Life =

2014 South Korean TV series

- Promotional poster
- Also known as: An Incomplete Life
- Genre: Workplace; Drama
- Based on: Misaeng by Yoon Tae-ho
- Developed by: Choi Jin-hee and Park Ji-young for tvN
- Written by: Jung Yoon-jung
- Directed by: Kim Won-seok
- Starring: Im Si-wan; Lee Sung-min; Kang So-ra; Kang Ha-neul; Byun Yo-han; Kim Dae-myung; Shin Eun-jung; Park Hae-joon
- Music by: Kim Joon-seok; Park Seong-il
- Country of origin: South Korea
- Original language: Korean
- No. of episodes: 20

Production
- Executive producers: Kim Mi-na; Lee Chan-ho
- Producers: Lee Jae-moon; Ham Seung-hoon; Lee Esther
- Production locations: Korea, Jordan
- Cinematography: Choi Sang-mook
- Editor: Kim Na-young
- Running time: 65 minutes
- Production company: Number 3 Pictures

Original release
- Network: tvN
- Release: October 17 – December 20, 2014

Misaeng: Incomplete Life (Korean: 미생 - 아직 살아 있지 못한 자; RR: Misaeng - ajik sara itji mothan ja) is a 2014 South Korean television series based on the eponymous webtoon series by Yoon Tae-ho. It aired on tvN from October 17 to December 20, 2014, on Fridays and Saturdays at 20:30 (KST) for 20 episodes.

The title translates to Go terminology meaning "an incomplete life" (literally "not yet" (미) "living/birth" (생), meaning "not yet alive"). Misaeng: Incomplete Life was the first Korean drama to film on location in Jordan, where actors Im Si-wan and Lee Sung-min shot the series's prologue in Amman, Petra, and Wadi Rum. Yim reprised his role as the protagonist, which he played in an earlier film adaptation, Incomplete Life: Prequel (2013).

The series became a cultural phenomenon and recorded high viewership ratings for a cable network program in Korea.

== Synopsis ==
Since he was a child, the board game baduk has been everything to Jang Geu-rae (Im Si-wan). But when he fails at achieving his dream of becoming a professional baduk player, Geu-rae must leave his isolated existence and enter the real world armed with nothing but a GED high school equivalency diploma on his resume. Through an acquaintance's recommendation, he gets hired as an intern at One International, a large trading company.

There, Geu-rae meets his boss, manager Oh Sang-shik (Lee Sung-min), who's a workaholic and has a warm personality; fellow intern Ahn Young-yi (Kang So-ra), who attracts her colleagues' ire because of her impressive educational credentials and by being extremely competent at any task; and Jang Baek-gi (Kang Ha-neul), a geeky co-worker whose anxious nature masks his inner ambition. Geu-rae learns to navigate and adapt to corporate culture, with baduk as his guide.

== Cast ==
=== Main ===
- Im Si-wan as Jang Geu-rae
  - Kim Ye-jun as young Jang Geu-rae

He formerly aspired to be a professional baduk player, to which he had devoted his life since childhood, but, unable to achieve this goal, he joins One International, although he has no formal skills or training. He joins Sales Team 3 as a two-year contract employee at One International.

- Lee Sung-min as Oh Sang-shik
- Kang So-ra as Ahn Young-yi She joins Resource Team as permanent employee at One International.
- Kang Ha-neul as Jang Baek-gi He joins Steel Team as permanent employee at One International.
- Byun Yo-han as Han Seok-yool. He joins Textile Team as permanent employee at One International.

=== Supporting ===
==== One International Sales Teams ====
===== Team 3 (to which Geu-rae is assigned) =====
- Kim Dae-myung as Kim Dong-shik
- Park Hae-joon as Chun Kwan-woong
- Kim Hee-won as Park Jong-shik
- Seo Yoon-ah as Lee Eun-ji (ep. 14)
- Kim Won-hae as Park Young-ho (ep. 20)

===== Team 1 =====
- Shin Eun-jung as Sun Ji-young
- Kim Sang-won as Mr. Um
- Shin Dong-hoon as Cha Soo-jin

===== Team 2 =====
- Ryu Tae-ho as Go Dong-ho
- Park Jin-soo as Assistant Manager Hwang
- Kim Ga-young as Jang Mi-ra

==== Others ====
- Yoon Jong-hoon as Lee Sang-hyun
- Yeo Eui-joo as Jang Ki-seok
- Kim Jong-soo as Kim Boo-ryun
- Kim Kyung-ryong as Lee Shin-tae
- Nam Kyung-eup as CEO of One International
- Lee Geung-young as Choi Young-hoo
- Son Jong-hak as Ma Bok-ryul
- Jung Hee-tae as Jung Hee-seok
- -- as Cha Jung-ho
- Jang Hyuk-jin as Moon Sang-pil
- Choi Gwi-hwa as Park Yong-gu
- Shin Jae-hoon as Yoo Hyung-ki
- Jeon Seok-ho as Ha Sung-joon
- Oh Min-suk as Kang Hae-joon
- Tae In-ho as Song Jeon-shik
- Park Jin-seo as Shin Da-in
- Hwang Seok-jeong as Kim Sun-joo
- Jo Hyun-sik as Kim Seok-ho
- Kim Jung-hak as Lee Seok-joong
- Kwak In-joon as Audit team leader
- Han Kap-soo as One International Jordan branch manager
- Choi Jae-woong as One International Jordan branch employee
- Sung Byung-sook as Geu-rae's mother
- Nam Myung-ryul as Geu-rae's baduk teacher
- Lee Si-won as Ha Jung-yeon
- -- as Senior colleague Kim
- Oh Yoon-hong as Oh Sang-shik's wife
- Lee Seung-joon as Shin Woo-hyun

=== Cameo appearances ===
- Cho Hun-hyun (cameo)
- Yoo Chang-hyuk (cameo)
- Oh Jung-se as Husband of Chungsol's CEO (cameo, ep. 20)
- Yoo Jae-myung as Factory worker (ep. 16)

== Original soundtrack ==
=== Part 1 ===
Released on October 24, 2014
| No. | Title | Lyrics | Music | Artist | Length |
|---|---|---|---|---|---|
| 1. | "Roman" (로망) | Taibian | Vladimir Vysotsky | Rose Motel | 4:05 |
| 2. | "Roman" (Inst.) | | | | 4:05 |
| Total length: | | | | | 8:10 |

=== Part 2 ===
Released on October 31, 2014
| No. | Title | Lyrics | Music | Artist | Length |
|---|---|---|---|---|---|
| 1. | "Tomorrow" (내일) | Seo Dong-sung | Park Seong-il | Han Hee-jung | 3:34 |
| 2. | "Tomorrow" (Inst.) | | | | 3:34 |
| Total length: | | | | | 7:08 |

=== Part 3 ===
Released on November 21, 2014
| No. | Title | Lyrics | Music | Artist | Length |
|---|---|---|---|---|---|
| 1. | "Fly" (날아) | Park Asher | Park Asher | Yi Sung-yol | 4:46 |
| 2. | "Fly" (Inst.) | | | | 4:46 |
| Total length: | | | | | 9:32 |

=== Part 4 ===
Released on December 5, 2014
| No. | Title | Lyrics | Music | Artist | Length |
|---|---|---|---|---|---|
| 1. | "Hidden Road" (가리워진 길) | Yoo Jae-ha | Yoo Jae-ha | Bolbbalgan4 | 4:22 |
| 2. | "Hidden Road" (Inst.) | | | | 4:22 |
| Total length: | | | | | 8:44 |

=== Part 5 ===
Released on December 12, 2014
| No. | Title | Lyrics | Music | Artist | Length |
|---|---|---|---|---|---|
| 1. | "Be Alright" (그래도.. 그래서) | Im Si-wan; Cheongdam Super | Im Si-wan; Park Seong-il; Cheongdam Super | Im Si-wan | 3:26 |
| 2. | "Be Alright" (Inst.) | | | | 3:26 |
| Total length: | | | | | 6:52 |

== Ratings ==
| Ep. | Original broadcast date | Average audience share | |
| Ep. | Original broadcast date | Nielsen Korea | |
| Ep. | Original broadcast date | Average rating | Peak rating |
|---|---|---|---|
| 1 | October 17, 2014 | 1.7% | 2.8% |
| 2 | October 18, 2014 | 2.5% | 3.1% |
| 3 | October 24, 2014 | 3.4% | 4.6% |
| 4 | October 25, 2014 | 3.6% | 4.9% |
| 5 | October 31, 2014 | 4.6% | 6.0% |
| 6 | November 1, 2014 | 3.7% | 5.4% |
| 7 | November 7, 2014 | 5.2% | 6.4% |
| 8 | November 8, 2014 | 5.0% | 6.6% |
| 9 | November 14, 2014 | 5.2% | 6.7% |
| 10 | November 15, 2014 | 5.9% | 7.0% |
| 11 | November 21, 2014 | 6.1% | 7.1% |
| 12 | November 22, 2014 | 6.3% | 7.8% |
| 13 | November 28, 2014 | 6.3% | 7.9% |
| 14 | November 29, 2014 | 5.8% | 7.9% |
| 15 | December 5, 2014 | 7.2% | 9.4% |
| 16 | December 6, 2014 | 7.4% | 8.6% |
| 17 | December 12, 2014 | 7.6% | 9.7% |
| 18 | December 13, 2014 | 8.0% | 9.5% |
| 19 | December 19, 2014 | 7.6% | 9.3% |
| 20 | December 20, 2014 | 8.4% | 10.3% |
| Average | | 5.6% | 7.1% |
In the table above, the blue numbers represent the lowest ratings and the red numbers represent the highest ratings.; This drama airs on a cable channel/pay TV which normally has a relatively smaller audience compared to free-to-air TV/public broadcasters (KBS, SBS, MBC and EBS).

== Awards and nominations ==
| Year | Award | Category | Recipient | Result |
|---|---|---|---|---|
| 2015 | 9th Cable TV Broadcasting Awards | Grand Prize (Daesang) | Misaeng: Incomplete Life | Won |
| 2015 | 9th Cable TV Broadcasting Awards | Star Award - Best Actor | Yim Si-wan | Won |
| 2015 | 9th Cable TV Broadcasting Awards | Star Award - Best Actor | Kang Ha-neul | Won |
| 2015 | 51st Baeksang Arts Awards | Best Drama | Misaeng: Incomplete Life | Nominated |
| 2015 | 51st Baeksang Arts Awards | Best Director (TV) | Kim Won-seok | Won |
| 2015 | 51st Baeksang Arts Awards | Best Actor (TV) | Lee Sung-min | Won |
| 2015 | 51st Baeksang Arts Awards | Best New Actor (TV) | Yim Si-wan | Won |
| 2015 | 51st Baeksang Arts Awards | Best New Actor (TV) | Kim Dae-myung | Nominated |
| 2015 | 10th Seoul International Drama Awards | Best Miniseries | Misaeng: Incomplete Life | Won |
| 2015 | 10th Seoul International Drama Awards | Best Director | Kim Won-seok | Nominated |
| 2015 | 8th Korea Drama Awards | Best Drama | Misaeng: Incomplete Life | Won |
| 2015 | 8th Korea Drama Awards | Best Production Director | Kim Won-seok | Nominated |
| 2015 | 8th Korea Drama Awards | Best Screenplay | Jung Yoon-jung | Nominated |
| 2015 | 8th Korea Drama Awards | Top Excellence Award, Actor | Yim Si-wan | Nominated |
| 2015 | 8th Korea Drama Awards | Excellence Award, Actor | Kim Dae-myung | Won |
| 2015 | 8th Korea Drama Awards | Special Jury Prize | Yim Si-wan | Won |
| 2015 | 4th APAN Star Awards | Top Excellence Award, Actor in a Miniseries | Lee Sung-min | Won |
| 2015 | 4th APAN Star Awards | Excellence Award, Actor in a Miniseries | Yim Si-wan | Won |
| 2015 | 4th APAN Star Awards | Excellence Award, Actress in a Miniseries | Kang So-ra | Nominated |
| 2015 | 4th APAN Star Awards | Best Supporting Actor | Kim Dae-myung | Nominated |
| 2015 | 4th APAN Star Awards | Best Supporting Actor | Lee Geung-young | Won |
| 2015 | 4th APAN Star Awards | Best New Actor | Byun Yo-han | Won |
| 2015 | 4th APAN Star Awards | Best New Actor | Kang Ha-neul | Nominated |
| 2016 | tvN10 Awards | Best Actor | Lee Sung-min | Won |
| 2016 | tvN10 Awards | Best Content Award, Drama | Misaeng: Incomplete Life | Won |
| 2016 | tvN10 Awards | Made in tvN, Actor in Drama | Yim Si-wan | Nominated |
| 2016 | tvN10 Awards | Made in tvN, Actress in Drama | Kang So-ra | Nominated |
| 2016 | tvN10 Awards | Scene-Stealer Award, Actor | Byun Yo-han | Nominated |
| 2016 | tvN10 Awards | Scene-Stealer Award, Actor | Kang Ha-neul | Nominated |

== Remake ==
- Hope: Kitai Zero no Shinnyu Shain
- Ordinary Glory; starring Bai Jingting, Mark Chao and Qiao Xin.
