= Monstar =

- Promotional poster
- Genre: Romance; Music; Teen Drama
- Written by: Jung Yoon-jung
- Directed by: Kim Won-seok
- Starring: Yong Jun-hyung; Ha Yeon-soo; Kang Ha-neul
- Country of origin: South Korea
- Original language: Korean
- No. of episodes: 12

Production
- Executive producers: Kang Hee-jeong; Lee Chan-ho
- Producer: Yoon Hyeon-gi
- Production location: Korea
- Cinematography: Choi Sang-muk
- Editor: Jung Hyun-gyeong
- Running time: 80 minutes on Fridays at 21:50 (KST)
- Production company: CJ E&M

Original release
- Network: Mnet
- Release: 17 May – 2 August 2013

Monstar (Korean: 몬스타) is a 2013 South Korean television series starring Yong Jun-hyung, Ha Yeon-soo, and Kang Ha-neul. It aired on music channel Mnet (and simultaneously on tvN) from May 17 to August 2, 2013, every Friday at 21:50 for 12 episodes. The drama is about how a group of teenagers are healed through the power of music.

== Plot ==
Seol-chan, a member of Korea's most popular K-pop boy band Men in Black, is provoked into pushing one of his crazy fans, and when that goes viral, his reputation plummets. As damage control, his agency tells him to quietly attend school for a while. Meanwhile, Se-yi, a new transfer student from New Zealand, draws attention in the school for both her talent and oddness. Misunderstandings occur between Seol-chan, Se-yi, and their other classmates. But in the midst of all the chaos, these students find a common interest which connects them to each other: music. Every character has his or her own untold stories, which have had significant impact in their lives. But as they gather together to sing and play the music they love, they learn to soothe the pain inside them, and to open each of their souls.

== Cast ==
=== Main cast ===
- Yong Jun-hyung as Yoon Seol-chan
  - Park Ji-woo as young Seol-chan
- Ha Yeon-soo as Min Se-yi
  - Kim Cho-eun as young Se-yi
- Kang Ha-neul as Jung Sun-woo
  - Yoon Chan-young as young Sun-woo
- Ahn Nae-sang as Han Ji-woong
  - Jung Joon-young as young Han Ji-woong

=== Color Bar members ===
- Dahee as Kim Na-na
- Kim Min-young as Shim Eun-ha
  - Ivy as adult Eun-ha
- Park Kyu-sun as Cha Do-nam
- Kang Eui-sik as Park Kyu-dong
  - Lee Eun-sung as young Kyu-dong

=== All For One members ===
- Moon Yong-suk as Ma Joon-hee
- Kim Yoo-hyun as Ma Hyo-rin
- Yoon Jong-hoon as Shin Jae-rok

=== Supporting cast ===
- Kim Sun-kyung as Choi Kyung
  - Lim Kim as young Choi Kyung
- Lee Hee-jin as Dokgo Soon
- Kim San-ho as Choi Joon-goo
- Jo Jae-yoon as Manager Hong
- Kim Hee-won as CEO Go
- Kim Jae-heung as math teacher
- Kim Young-hee as language teacher
- Lee Dal-hyung as head teacher
- Nat Thewphaingam as Nawin Thammarat
- Kim Min-young as Shim Eun-ha
- Kim Young-ho as Min Gwang-ho
- Kim Young-jae as PD Byun Hee-sool
- Im Hyun-sik as Men In Black member (ep. 2, 6, 9, and 12)
- Lee Min-hyuk as Men In Black member (ep. 2, 6, 9, and 12)
- Yook Sung-jae as Arnold, Men In Black member (ep. 2, 6, 9, and 12)
- Lee Chang-sub as Men In Black member (ep. 2, 6, 9, and 12)

=== Cameo appearances ===
- Ryu Hye-rin as Seol-chan's fan
- Lee Joo-yeon as Ah-ri, actress in opening scene with Seol-chan (ep. 1)
- Lee Sung-min as Kwon Tae-hyun, movie director (ep. 1)
- Ko Chang-seok as Do-nam's judo master (ep. 5)
- Park Ga-ram as waiter (ep. 6)
- Kim Ji-soo as performer (ep. 10)
- Jo Moon-geun as performer (ep. 10)
- Nam Ji-hyun (Note: Credited as Son Ji-hyun.) as Stella (ep. 12)
- No Min-woo as Daniel Park (ep. 12)
- Kim Min-kyu

== Production ==
=== Casting ===
Monstar was director Kim Won-seok's first work after transferring to CJ E&M. On February 18, 2013, CJ E&M announced that the music drama Monstar would be aired in early April. They also confirmed Yong Jun-hyung as the male lead. On February 28, 2013, Kang Ha-neul was confirmed as second male lead.

=== Interlude music ===
The series features numerous song covers sung onscreen by the characters.

Episode	Song title	Original performer
01	Past Days (지난날)	Ryu Jae-ha
01	After Time Passes (시간이 흐른 뒤엔)	Postino
01	Libertango	Astor Piazzolla
01	It's alcohol (술이야)	Vibe
01	Don't Be Sad (슬퍼하지 말아요)	Kim Hyun-sik
01	Mister	KARA
01	The Wind is Blowing (바람이 분다)	Lee So-ra
02	If we are to speak (말하자면)	Kim Sung-jae
02	After Time Passes (시간이 흐른 뒤엔)	Postino
02	Symphony No. 25 in G minor	Wolfgang Amadeus Mozart
02	A nap (선잠)	--
02	Trouble Maker	Trouble Maker
02	River Flows in You	Yiruma
02	Nocturne (야상곡)	Kim Yuna
03	A nap (선잠)	--
03	Atlantis Princess (아틀란티스 소녀)	BoA
03	Like a Child (아이처럼)	Kim Dong-ryul
03	Rainism	Rain
03	Abracadabra	Brown Eyed Girls
03	Replay (누난 너무 예뻐)	Shinee
03	Heartbeat	2PM
03	Nobody	Wonder Girls
03	Nocturne (야상곡)	Kim Yuna
03	You were born to be love (당신은 사랑받기위해 태어난 사람)	Lee Soo-young
04	Firefly (개똥벌레)	Shin Hyung-won
04	Sweet Little Kitty (낭만고양이)	Cherry Filter
04	Whale hunting (고래사냥)	Song Chang-sik
04	Snail (달팽이)	Panic
04	Goose's Dream (거위의꿈)	Insooni
04	('Cause) I'm Your Girl	S.E.S
04	Ma Boy	Sistar19
04	You Raise Me Up	Secret Garden
04	Pachelbel's Canon	--
05	Single Ladies (Put a Ring on It)	Beyoncé
05	I Am the Best (내가제일잘나가)	2NE1
05	The moon is rising, let's go (달이 차오른다, 가자)	Jang Kiha and the Faces
05	Sonata of Temptation	Ivy
06	Like an Indian doll (인디언 인형처럼)	Nami
06	A nap (선잠)	--
06	I'm Sorry	Beast
06	A marsh (늪)	Jo Kwanwoo
06	I will love you (널 사랑하겠어)	Dongmulwon
07	If I Leave (나가거든)	Sumi Jo
07	Person, Love (사람, 사랑)	Lena Park, Kim Bum-soo
07	Amazing Grace	--
07	Don't Let me Cry (날 울리지마)	Shin Seung-hun
08	You Wouldn't Answer My Calls (전활 받지 않는 너에게)	2AM
08	Your Meaning (너의 의미)	Sanulrim
08	To You Who Hopes for My Despair (나의 절망을 바라는 당신에게)	MoT
09	Departure (출발)	어떤날
09	Only The Words I Love You (사랑해 이말밖엔)	Rich
09	Let's run (말 달리자)	Crying Nut
09	When It Comes Tomorrow (내일이 찾아오면)	Oh Jang-bak
10	First Love (첫사랑)	Busker Busker
10	Is This Love (이게 사랑일까)	Coffee Boy
10	If we are to speak (말하자면)	Kim Sung-jae
10	10 Minutes	Lee Hyori
10	My Song (나의노래)	Moonlight Fairy Reversal Grandslam
11	Wind, Please Stop Blowing (바람아멈추어다오)	Lee Ji-yeon
11	You loved your friend's girlfriend (친구의 친구를 사랑했네)	Lee Seung-chul
11	Wind, From Where Are You Blowing (바람, 어디에서 부는지)	Lucid Fall
11	Leaving (떠나가네)	Kim Young-ho
11	Scattered Days (흩어진 나날들)	Kang Soo-jee
12	Scattered Days (흩어진 나날들)	Kang Soo-jee
12	One work two (일과 이분의 일)	Two Two
12	Lefthander (왼손잡이)	Panic
12	After Love Gone (사랑이지나가면)	Lee Moon-sae
12	Youth era (청춘시대)	Cho Yong-pil
12	Only That Is My World (그것만이내세상)	Deulgukhwa
12	March (행진)	Deulgukhwa
12	My Song (나의노래)	Moonlight Fairy Reversal Grandslam

== Original soundtrack ==
Monstar : Original Soundtrack

Soundtrack album by Various Artists
- Released: August 9, 2013
- Genres: Pop, K-pop, soundtrack
- Label: CJ E&M

No.	Title	Artist	Length
1.	"Past Days" (지난 날)	Yong Jun-hyung of Beast, BTOB, Ha Yeon-soo	3:07
2.	"After Time Passes" (시간이 흐른 뒤엔)	Yong Jun-hyung of Beast & BTOB	4:36
3.	"Atlantis Princess" (아틀란티스 소녀)	Ha Yeon-soo, Kang Ha-neul, & Kim Cho-eun	3:05
4.	"Snooze (I Will Be Your Love)" (선잠 (나 그대의 사랑이 되리))	J Rabbit	3:24
5.	"Don't Make Me Cry" (날 울리지마)	Yong Jun-hyung, Ha Yeon-soo, Kang Ha-neul, Kang Eui-sik, Dahee, Kim Min-young, Park Kyu-sun	3:09
6.	"To You Who Hopes for My Despair" (나의 절망을 바라는 당신에게)	Kang Eui-sik	3:16
7.	"First Love" (첫사랑)	Yong Jun-hyung of Beast & BTOB	3:33
8.	"Only That Is My World / March" (그것만이 내 세상 / 행진)	Yong Jun-hyung, Ha Yeon-soo, Kang Ha-neul, Kang Eui-sik, Dahee, Kim Min-young, Park Kyu-sun	3:25
9.	"Practice" (연습)	Ha Yeon-soo	3:26
10.	"Scattered Days" (흩어진 나날들)	Park Hyo-shin	3:51
11.	"Monstar"	Various Artists	0:50
12.	"Wandering Stars" (방황하는 별)	Various Artists	2:45
13.	"Night of the Seventeen Years" (열일곱 세이의 밤)	Various Artists	2:15
14.	"Doubting"	Various Artists	2:34
15.	"Shake Up"	Various Artists	2:10
16.	"Catch the Star"	Various Artists	1:50
17.	"Waltz of the Yearnin" (그리움의 왈츠)	Various Artists	1:34
18.	"17 to 1 of the Legends" (17대1의 전설)	Various Artists	1:05
19.	"Pit-a-Pat" (두근두근)	Various Artists	1:13

== Ratings ==
In this table, the blue numbers represent the lowest ratings and the red numbers represent the highest ratings.

Ep.	Original broadcast date	Average audience share
Ep.	Original broadcast date	AGB Nielsen
Ep.	Original broadcast date	Nationwide
1	May 17, 2013	1.60%
2	May 24, 2013	2.60%
3	May 31, 2013	2.40%
4	June 7, 2013	2.80%
5	June 14, 2013	2.20%
6	June 21, 2013	2.80%
7	June 28, 2013	2.30%
8	July 5, 2013	3.10%
9	July 12, 2013	2.80%
10	July 19, 2013	2.50%
11	July 26, 2013	1.11%
12	August 2, 2013	0.80%
Average		2.25%

- This drama airs on a cable channel/pay TV which normally has a relatively smaller audience compared to free-to-air TV/public broadcasters (KBS, SBS, MBC and EBS).

== International broadcast ==
- Japan - It aired on DATV beginning April 30, 2014, followed by reruns on KNTV on May 17 to August 2, 2014.
- Hong Kong: NOW 101 and Channel M
- Singapore: Channel U
- Malaysia: 8TV
- (Chinese Taipei) Taiwan: Channel M
- Philippines: Channel M
- Indonesia: RTV
- Thailand: Workpoint TV

== Awards and nominations ==
Year	Award	Category	Recipient	Result
2013	7th Mnet 20's Choice Awards	20's Booming Star - Male	Yong Jun-hyung	Nominated
2013	7th Mnet 20's Choice Awards	20's Booming Star - Female	Ha Yeon-soo	Won
2013	7th Mnet 20's Choice Awards	20's Hot Cover Music	"Past Days" - Yong Jun-hyung	Nominated
2013	6th Korea Drama Awards	Best New Actor	Yong Jun-hyung	Won
2013	6th Korea Drama Awards	Best New Actress	Ha Yeon-soo	Nominated
2013	6th Korea Drama Awards	Best Couple Award	Yong Jun-hyung and Ha Yeon-soo	Nominated
2013	2nd APAN Star Awards	Best New Actress	Ha Yeon-soo	Nominated
2014	16th Seoul International Youth Film Festival	Best Young Actress	Ha Yeon-soo	Nominated
