= Misaeng (manhwa) =

South Korean manhwa series

미생 RR: Misaeng MR: Misaeng
- Genre: Drama
- Author: Yoon Tae-ho
- Publisher: Wisdom House
- Original run: 2012–2013
- Volumes: 9

Misaeng (Korean: 미생; Hanja: 未生; lit. 'An Incomplete Life') is a South Korean manhwa series written and illustrated by Yoon Tae-ho. It was released in webtoon form on internet portal Daum from 2012 to 2013; the first volume in print was published on September 15, 2012. It was adapted into a TV series of the same name in 2014.

With his webtoon, author Yoon Tae-ho drew an analogy between life in modern society and the game of baduk, a chess-like strategy board game. He also wrote vivid descriptions of the everyday life and struggles of Korean corporate culture as his flawed characters deal with the fierce competition for survival, interpersonal work relationships and office politics. Misaeng gained immense popularity among Korean white-collar workers in their twenties and thirties largely because its realism resonated with their experiences. It drew 1 billion hits when it was published on online portal Daum from September 2012 to October 2013, and the nine-volume paperback version sold 900,000 copies. It is now considered a must-read comic in the country.
