= KG Group =

South Korean conglomerate

- Type: Chaebol
- Industry: Various
- Founded: September 2003; 23 years ago
- Founder: Kwak Jae-sun
- Headquarters: Jung-gu, Seoul, South Korea
- Key people: Kwak Jae-sun (chairman)
- Revenue: ₩4,983 billion (2021)
- Net income: ₩308 billion (2021)
- Total assets: ₩5,346 billion (2021)
- Website: kggroup.co.kr/eng/

The KG Group (Korean: KG그룹, IPA: [kʰeidʑi kɯɾup]) is a South Korean chaebol established in 2003 and operating, through its affiliates, in various industries and other businesses (including chemicals, steel, services, and media). The main affiliates of the KG Group are KG Chemical (its core company) and KG Steel.

The KG Group expanded through mergers and acquisitions.

== History ==
In 1985, Kwak Jae-sun and other investors founded Seil, a power plant company. In 2003, Kwak sold his Seil stake and used the money obtained to acquire a company under receivership, Gyeonggi Chemical (later renamed KG Chemical), initially a fertilizer producer which diversified through merging, and established the KG Group chaebol.

In the following years, the KG Group expanded through a mergers and acquisitions strategy. In 2005, it acquired the cogeneration company Sihwa Energy (later renamed to KG Energy and then KG ETS), and in 2008, it purchased the delivery company Yellow Cap (KG Yellow Cap). In 2010, it acquired waste treatment company Eco Service Korea (name changed to KG ETS after being merged with KG Energy in 2011), the fund evaluation company Zeroin (KG Zeroin), and the media company Edaily.

In 2011, the KG Group acquired the e-commerce company Inicis (renamed KG Inicis) and its subsidiary, the electronic payment provider Mobilians (KG Mobilians). In 2013, it acquired Eduone (renamed KG Eduone). In 2015, KG Inicis acquired Dongbu Parcel from the Dongbu Corporation and merged it with KG Yellow Cap, the combination renamed KG Logis, but sold it in 2017. In 2016, KG Inicis also took a 60% stake in Samsung Allat from Samsung C&T Corporation and Samsung Card (later changed its name to KG Allat and merged with KG Mobilians in 2019) and the South Korean KFC franchise in 2017 from CVC Capital Partners. In April 2023, the KG Group sold KFC Korea to Orchestra Private Equity.

In May 2019, the KG Group established a special purpose corporation (SPC), KG Steel, by investing funds from group affiliates (such as KG Chemical and KG ETS), in order to take a 40% controlling stake in Dongbu Steel. It formed a consortium with Cactus Private Equity, a South Korean private equity fund, to finish the transaction. The acquisition was completed in August 2019 and the assets of the KG Group increased from ₩2.23 trillion at the end of 2018 to ₩5.256 trillion.

In October 2020, KG Inicis, through a SPC called Crown F&B, acquired a 93.8% stake in Hollys F&B (the operator of the Hollys Coffee coffeehouse franchise) from IMM Private Equity, a private equity fund manager.

In June 2022, the KG Mobility consortium (KG ETS, KG Mobilians, KG Steel, Cactus Private Equity, KG Inicis, and Pavilion Private Equity), a KG Group affiliate, was selected as the final bidder for South Korean car manufacturer SsangYong Motor. In August 2022, South Korea's Free Trade Commission approved KG Group acquisition of a 61% controlling stake in receivership-bound SsangYong. The acquisition payments were completed later that month. In September 2022, the Seoul Bankruptcy Court agreed to SsangYong's receivership exit plan, including issuing new shares in order to pay the creditors. The KG Group was set to start the process to exit SsangYong's receivership in early October and finish the acquisition process on or before 14 October, the SsangYong sale deadline. After delays, the consortium started the receivership exit procedures on 31 October by requesting the receivership termination to the Seoul Bankruptcy Court. The Court approved the receivership exit on 11 November, finalising the consortium's acquisition. In December 2022, Kwak said SsangYong would be renamed as KG Mobility by March 2023.

== Corporate ==
=== Structure ===
Partial structure of the KG Group as of April 2023

As other chaebol, the KG Group is not a single company controlling others but rather a loose grouping of companies (affiliates) that is linked through a complex, circular cross ownership structure. By June 2020, the structure was centred around three companies: KG Chemical (the core company of the group and de facto parent), KG Zeroin (the largest KG Chemical shareholder, majority controlled by the Kwak family) and KG (a holding company). In January 2021, the KG holding was merged into KG Chemical. In December 2022, in order to avoid some South Korean regulations, KG Inicis donated part of its minority KG Chemical stake to a non-profit foundation. In June 2023, KG ETS broke its existing cross shareholding by selling its minority stake in KG Chemical to KG Zeroin, leaving the ownership structure centred around KG Chemical, KG Zeroin and KG ETS.

The two main affiliates of the KG Group by business volume are KG Chemical and KG Steel. The KG Group affiliates are set up to work autonomously and are called "family" instead of affiliate internally. As of May 2022, the number of affiliates was 21 domestic and 8 overseas.

=== Branding ===
According to Kwak, the KG Group name is an initialism for "Korea Green".

The KG Group has two logos, often used in conjunction: a wordmark with "KG" in sans-serif script and a purple, violet, orange, and yellow logo simbolising a prism. The official font for the KG Group is Avenir. The slogan is "think great" with the k and g letters stilised in uppercase.

== Main affiliates ==
=== KG Chemical ===
KG Chemical Co., Ltd. (KG케미칼 주식회사; KG Kemikal Jusighoesa), traded as KRX: 001390, is a company producing chemical products such as chemical fertilizers, concrete admixtures, heavy water agents, and purifiers. In 2022, it posted ₩6,607,355 million in revenue and ₩501,201 million in operating profit. Its net profit was ₩170,062 million. End-of-year assets were valued at ₩6,981,909 million.

Gyeonggi Chemical (the previous name of KG Chemical) was established in 1954 and its main product was chemical fertilizers. By 2000, it was the largest in the domestic fertilizer market. The company was listed on the South Korean stock market in 1989.

Following the 1997 Asian financial crisis, Gyeonggi Chemical sold off its affiliates (Gyeonggi Mining and Daljae General Trading Corporation) but it did not make a major restructuring to improve its financial situation. The company declared bankruptcy in 1999. In 2002, the Mitsubishi Group, with which Gyeonggi Chemical had a partnership, formed a consortium and tried to take over, but it failed. The company was acquired by Kwak in 2003 and adopted its current name. In 2017, it acquired Enerchem, which produces high-purity nickel sulfate, a raw material for rechargeable battery cathode active materials.

The company's first base (plant and headquarters) was in Bucheon. In 1982, it built a second plant at Onsan (a port in Ulsan). The Bucheon facilities were sold off in 2013 and the company moved its headquarters to Onsan.

=== KG Steel ===
KG Steel Co., Ltd. (KG스틸 주식회사; KG Seutil Jusighoesa) is a producer of steel-related products. KG Steel's 2022 revenue was ₩3,819,689 million and net profit ₩536,001 million. Assets were ₩3,051,507 million.

=== Other publicly-listed operations ===
The following table is a summary of the other publicly listed KG Group affiliates as of June 2023:

| Company | Traded as | Est. | Headquarters | Revenue | Assets | Sub. | Main activity |
|---|---|---|---|---|---|---|---|
| KG ETS Co., Ltd. (Korean: 케이지이티에스 주식회사; RR: Keiji Itieseu Jusighoesa) | KRX: 151860 | 29 October 1999 | Siheung, South Korea | ▲ ₩4,944,241 million (2022) | ▲ ₩5,091,879 million (2022) | KG Mobility | Renewable energies, waste management |
| KG Inicis Co., Ltd. (Korean: 주식회사 케이지이니시스; RR: Jusighoesa Keiji Inisiseu) | KRX: 035600 | 3 November 1998 | Jung-gu, Seoul, South Korea | ▲ ₩1,177,625 million (2022) | ▲ ₩1,452,980 million (2022) | KG Mobilians; Hollys F&B | Internet and computer operation related business, electronic payment agency |
| KG Mobilians Co., Ltd. (Korean: 주식회사 케이지모빌리언스; RR: Jusighoesa Keiji Mobillieonseu) | KRX: 046440 | 17 March 2000 | Jung-gu, Seoul, South Korea | ▼ ₩276,117 million (2022) | ▼ ₩474,189 million (2022) | | Electronic payment provider |
| KG Mobility Corporation (Korean: 케이지모빌리티 주식회사; RR: Keiji Mobilliti Jusighoesa) | KRX: 003620 | 6 December 1962 (incorporated) | Pyeongtaek, South Korea | ▲ ₩3,423,341 million (2022) | | | Car manufacturer |
