= Ha Yeon-soo =

South Korean actress (born 1990

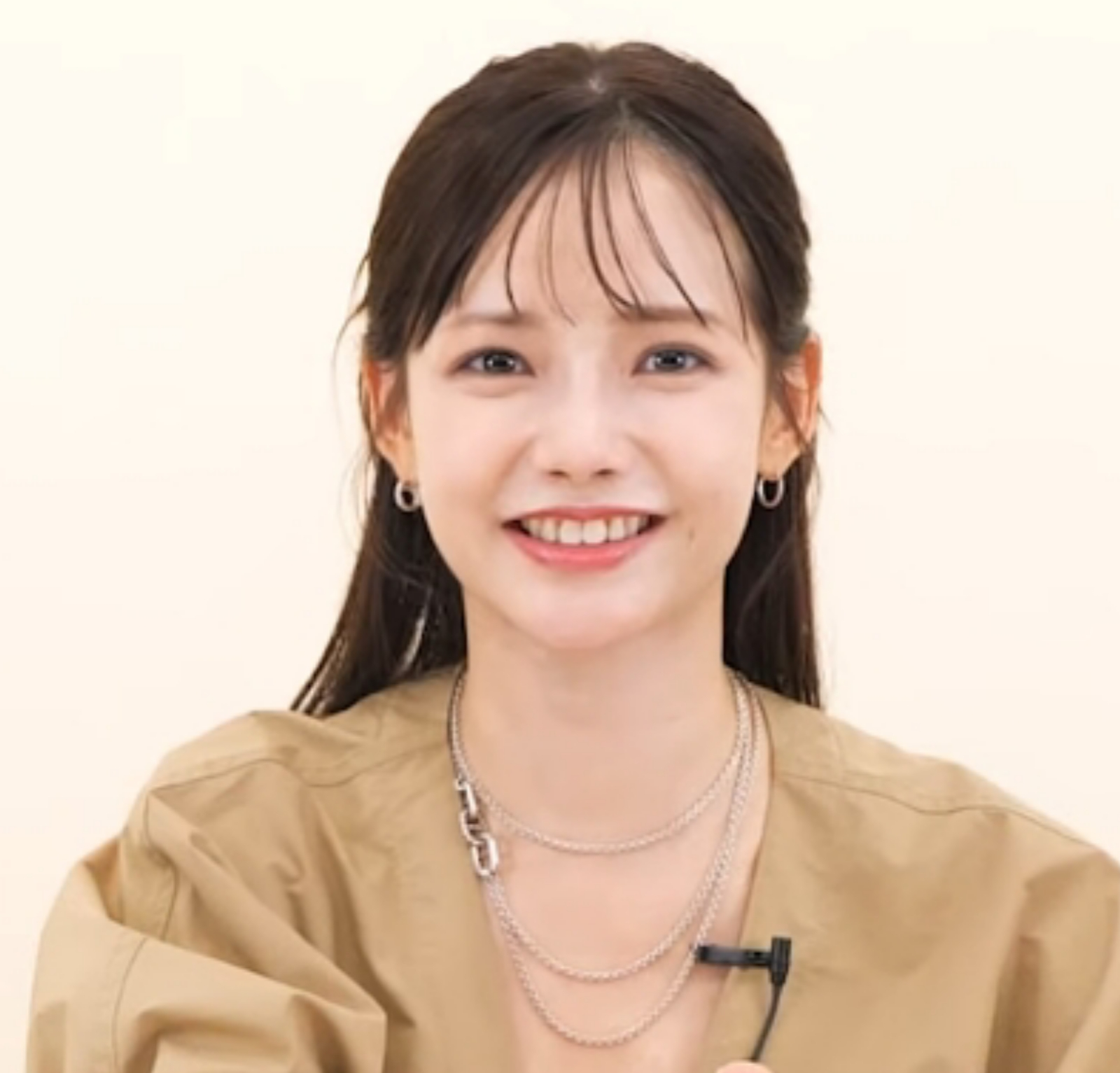
- Ha in September 2024
- Born: Yoo Yeon-soo; October 10, 1990 (age 36); Busan, South Korea
- Occupation: Actress
- Years active: 2013–present
- Agent: Twin Planet (Japan)

Korean name
- Hangul: 유연수
- RR: Yu Yeonsu
- MR: Yu Yŏnsu

Stage name
- Hangul: 하연수
- RR: Ha Yeonsu
- MR: Ha Yŏnsu

Yoo Yeon-soo (Korean: 유연수; born October 10, 1990), better known by the stage name Ha Yeon-soo (하연수), is a South Korean actress.

== Personal life ==
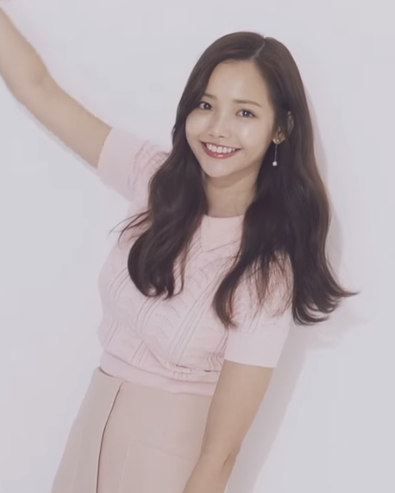
Ha in 2016

On May 10, 2022, Ha's contract with the former agency has expired and she traveled to Japan to study.

== Filmography ==
=== Film ===
Year	Title	Role	Notes	Ref.
2013	Very Ordinary Couple	Joo Hyo-seon		
2014	Sunshowers	Yoo-ri	Short film	
2019	Rosebud	Hong Jang-mi (young)		
2027	The Tiger and Her Wings: The Movie	Choi Hyang-suk	Japanese film	

=== Television series ===
Year	Title	Role	Notes	Ref.
2013	Monstar	Min Se-yi		
2013–14	Potato Star 2013QR3	Na Jin-ah	Sitcom	
2014–15	4 Legendary Witches	Seo Mi-oh		
2015–16	Conte and the City	Ha Yeon-soo		
2016	Drinking Solo	Hwang Joo-yeon	Cameo (ep.1–2,16)	
2017	Oh! Dear Goddesses of Basement	Iris		
2018	Rich Man	Kim Bo-ra		
2024	The Tiger and Her Wings	Choi Hyang-suk	Japanese drama	

=== Variety shows ===
Year	Title	Role	Note	Ref.
2019	Trend with Me Season 2	Cast member		
2017	Running Man	Guest	Ep 374	

=== Music video appearances ===
Year	Title	Artist	Ref.
2015	"Let's Not Fall in Love"	Big Bang	
2019	"이 마음 (Heart)"	Punch	

== Discography ==
=== Soundtrack appearances ===
Year	Title	Notes
2013	"Past Days"	Tracks from an OST of the television series Monstar
2013	"Atlantis Princess"	Tracks from an OST of the television series Monstar
2013	"Don't Make Me Cry"	Tracks from an OST of the television series Monstar
2013	"Only That Is My World / March"	Tracks from an OST of the television series Monstar
2013	"Practice"	Tracks from an OST of the television series Monstar

== Awards and nominations ==
Year	Award	Category	Nominated work	Result	Ref.
2013	22nd Buil Film Awards	Best New Actress	Very Ordinary Couple	Nominated	
2013	7th Mnet 20's Choice Awards	20's Booming Star – Female	Monstar	Won	
2013	6th Korea Drama Awards	Best New Actress	Monstar	Nominated	
2013	6th Korea Drama Awards	Best Couple (with Yong Jun-hyung)	Monstar	Nominated	
2013	2nd APAN Star Awards	Best New Actress	Monstar	Nominated	
2014	16th Seoul International Youth Film Festival	Best New Actress	Monstar	Nominated	
2015	34th MBC Drama Awards	Best New Actress in a Special Project Drama	4 Legendary Witches	Nominated	
