= List of United Kingdom locations: Bou-Boz =

The United Kingdom

This is part of the list of United Kingdom locations: a gazetteer of place names in the United Kingdom showing each place's locality and geographical coordinates.

== Bo (continued) ==
=== Bou ===
| Location | Locality | Coordinates (links to map & photo sources) | OS grid reference |
|---|---|---|---|
| Bough Beech | Kent | 51.19°N 00.13°E | TQ4946 |
| Boughrood | Powys | 52.04°N 03.27°W | SO1339 |
| Boughrood Brest | Powys | 52.03°N 03.25°W | SO1438 |
| Boughspring | Gloucestershire | 51.67°N 02.65°W | ST5597 |
| Boughton | Northamptonshire | 52.27°N 00.90°W | SP7565 |
| Boughton | Nottinghamshire | 53.20°N 00.99°W | SK6768 |
| Boughton | Lincolnshire | 52.99°N 00.33°W | TF1245 |
| Boughton | Cheshire | 53.18°N 02.88°W | SJ4166 |
| Boughton | Norfolk | 52.58°N 00.50°E | TF7001 |
| Boughton Aluph | Kent | 51.19°N 00.90°E | TR0348 |
| Boughton Corner | Kent | 51.19°N 00.91°E | TR0448 |
| Boughton Green | Kent | 51.23°N 00.51°E | TQ7651 |
| Boughton Heath | Cheshire | 53.17°N 02.86°W | SJ4265 |
| Boughton Lees | Kent | 51.18°N 00.88°E | TR0247 |
| Boughton Malherbe | Kent | 51.20°N 00.69°E | TQ8849 |
| Boughton Monchelsea | Kent | 51.23°N 00.51°E | TQ7651 |
| Boughton Street | Kent | 51.29°N 00.95°E | TR0659 |
| Boughton End | Bedfordshire | 52.02°N 00.57°W | SP9837 |
| Boulby | Redcar and Cleveland | 54.56°N 00.82°W | NZ7619 |
| Bould | Oxfordshire | 51.88°N 01.65°W | SP2421 |
| Boulder Clough | Calderdale | 53.70°N 01.95°W | SE0323 |
| Bouldnor | Isle of Wight | 50.69°N 01.47°W | SZ3789 |
| Bouldon | Shropshire | 52.46°N 02.67°W | SO5485 |
| Boulmer | Northumberland | 55.41°N 01.59°W | NU2614 |
| Boulsdon | Gloucestershire | 51.91°N 02.43°W | SO7024 |
| Boulston | Pembrokeshire | 51.77°N 04.94°W | SM9712 |
| Boultham | Lincolnshire | 53.20°N 00.56°W | SK9669 |
| Boultham Moor | Lincolnshire | 53.20°N 00.57°W | SK9568 |
| Boulton | City of Derby | 52.88°N 01.43°W | SK3832 |
| Boulton Moor | City of Derby | 52.88°N 01.43°W | SK3832 |
| Boundary | Staffordshire | 52.97°N 02.03°W | SJ9842 |
| Boundary | Leicestershire | 52.75°N 01.51°W | SK3318 |
| Bound Skerry | Shetland Islands | 60.42°N 00.72°W | HU702719 |
| Boundstone | Surrey | 51.18°N 00.81°W | SU8344 |
| Bourn | Cambridgeshire | 52.18°N 00.07°W | TL3256 |
| Bournbrook | Birmingham | 52.43°N 01.94°W | SP0482 |
| Bourne | North Somerset | 51.32°N 02.74°W | ST4859 |
| Bourne | Lincolnshire | 52.76°N 00.38°W | TF0920 |
| Bourne End (Cranfield) | Bedfordshire | 52.08°N 00.60°W | SP9644 |
| Bourne End (Bletsoe) | Bedfordshire | 52.22°N 00.52°W | TL0160 |
| Bourne End | Buckinghamshire | 51.57°N 00.71°W | SU8987 |
| Bourne End | Hertfordshire | 51.74°N 00.52°W | TL0206 |
| Bournemouth | Bournemouth, Christchurch and Poole | 50.71°N 01.88°W | SZ0891 |
| Bournes Green | Worcestershire | 52.36°N 02.13°W | SO9174 |
| Bournes Green | Essex | 51.54°N 00.75°E | TQ9186 |
| Bournes Green | Gloucestershire | 51.73°N 02.14°W | SO9004 |
| Bourne Vale | Walsall | 52.58°N 01.91°W | SP0699 |
| Bourne Valley | Poole | 50.73°N 01.91°W | SZ0693 |
| Bournheath | Worcestershire | 52.36°N 02.08°W | SO9474 |
| Bournmoor | Durham | 54.85°N 01.51°W | NZ3151 |
| Bournside | Gloucestershire | 51.88°N 02.10°W | SO9321 |
| Bournstream | Gloucestershire | 51.64°N 02.37°W | ST7494 |
| Bournville | Birmingham | 52.42°N 01.94°W | SP0481 |
| Bourton | Dorset | 51.06°N 02.34°W | ST7630 |
| Bourton | Shropshire | 52.56°N 02.60°W | SO5996 |
| Bourton | Buckinghamshire | 51.99°N 00.98°W | SP7033 |
| Bourton | Oxfordshire | 51.58°N 01.66°W | SU2387 |
| Bourton | North Somerset | 51.37°N 02.90°W | ST3764 |
| Bourton | Wiltshire | 51.37°N 01.94°W | SU0464 |
| Bourton on Dunsmore | Warwickshire | 52.32°N 01.37°W | SP4370 |
| Bourton-on-the-Hill | Gloucestershire | 51.98°N 01.75°W | SP1732 |
| Bourton-on-the-Water | Gloucestershire | 51.87°N 01.76°W | SP1620 |
| Bourton Westwood | Shropshire | 52.56°N 02.59°W | SO6097 |
| Bourtreehill | North Ayrshire | 55.61°N 04.63°W | NS3439 |
| Bousd | Argyll and Bute | 56.67°N 06.49°W | NM2563 |
| Bousta | Shetland Islands | 60.29°N 01.60°W | HU2257 |
| Boustead Hill | Cumbria | 54.92°N 03.10°W | NY2959 |
| Bouth | Cumbria | 54.25°N 03.04°W | SD3285 |
| Bouthwaite | North Yorkshire | 54.13°N 01.81°W | SE1271 |
| Bouts | Worcestershire | 52.22°N 01.95°W | SP0358 |

=== Bov ===
| Location | Locality | Coordinates (links to map & photo sources) | OS grid reference |
|---|---|---|---|
| Boveney | Buckinghamshire | 51.48°N 00.66°W | SU9377 |
| Boveridge | Dorset | 50.92°N 01.91°W | SU0614 |
| Boverton | The Vale Of Glamorgan | 51.40°N 03.46°W | SS9868 |
| Bovey | Devon | 50.73°N 04.21°W | SX4495 |
| Bovey Tracey | Devon | 50.58°N 03.68°W | SX8178 |
| Bovingdon | Hertfordshire | 51.71°N 00.53°W | TL0103 |
| Bovingdon Green | Hertfordshire | 51.70°N 00.53°W | TL0102 |
| Bovingdon Green | Buckinghamshire | 51.56°N 00.80°W | SU8386 |
| Bovinger | Essex | 51.72°N 00.19°E | TL5205 |
| Bovington Camp | Dorset | 50.70°N 02.24°W | SY8389 |

=== Bow ===
| Location | Locality | Coordinates (links to map & photo sources) | OS grid reference |
|---|---|---|---|
| Bow (Mid Devon) | Devon | 50.79°N 03.81°W | SS7201 |
| Bow (South Devon) | Devon | 50.39°N 03.67°W | SX8156 |
| Bow | Oxfordshire | 51.64°N 01.50°W | SU3494 |
| Bow | Tower Hamlets | 51.52°N 00.04°W | TQ3682 |
| Bowbank | Durham | 54.60°N 02.09°W | NY9423 |
| Bowbeck | Suffolk | 52.33°N 00.84°E | TL9475 |
| Bow Brickhill | Milton Keynes | 51.99°N 00.69°W | SP9034 |
| Bowbridge | Gloucestershire | 51.73°N 02.21°W | SO8504 |
| Bowbrook | Shropshire | 52.70°N 02.81°W | SJ4512 |
| Bow Broom | Rotherham | 53.48°N 01.32°W | SK4599 |
| Bowburn | Durham | 54.73°N 01.53°W | NZ3038 |
| Bowcombe | Isle of Wight | 50.67°N 01.35°W | SZ4686 |
| Bow Common | Tower Hamlets | 51.51°N 00.02°W | TQ3781 |
| Bowd | Devon | 50.70°N 03.27°W | SY1090 |
| Bowden | Dorset | 51.00°N 02.32°W | ST7723 |
| Bowden | Devon | 50.32°N 03.63°W | SX8448 |
| Bowden | Scottish Borders | 55.56°N 02.71°W | NT5530 |
| Bowden Hill | Wiltshire | 51.40°N 02.10°W | ST9367 |
| Bowdens | Somerset | 51.04°N 02.84°W | ST4128 |
| Bowderdale | Cumbria | 54.43°N 02.51°W | NY6704 |
| Bowdon | Trafford | 53.37°N 02.37°W | SJ7586 |
| Bower | Highland | 58.54°N 03.32°W | ND2363 |
| Bower Ashton | North Somerset | 51.43°N 02.63°W | ST5671 |
| Bowerchalke | Wiltshire | 51.00°N 01.97°W | SU0223 |
| Bower Heath | Hertfordshire | 51.83°N 00.34°W | TL1416 |
| Bowerhill | Wiltshire | 51.35°N 02.13°W | ST9162 |
| Bower Hinton | Somerset | 50.95°N 02.78°W | ST4518 |
| Bowerhope | Scottish Borders | 55.48°N 03.18°W | NT2522 |
| Bower House Tye | Suffolk | 52.02°N 00.88°E | TL9840 |
| Bowers | Staffordshire | 52.91°N 02.28°W | SJ8135 |
| Bowers Gifford | Essex | 51.56°N 00.52°E | TQ7588 |
| Bowershall | Fife | 56.10°N 03.46°W | NT0991 |
| Bowes | Durham | 54.51°N 02.01°W | NY9913 |
| Bowes Park | Haringey | 51.60°N 00.12°W | TQ3091 |
| Bowgreave | Lancashire | 53.88°N 02.77°W | SD4943 |
| Bowgreen | Trafford | 53.37°N 02.37°W | SJ7586 |
| Bow Head | Orkney Islands | 59.35°N 02.95°W | HY456528 |
| Bowhill | Scottish Borders | 55.53°N 02.92°W | NT4227 |
| Bowhill | Fife | 56.14°N 03.27°W | NT2195 |
| Bowhousebog | North Lanarkshire | 55.80°N 03.83°W | NS8558 |
| Bowismiln | Scottish Borders | 55.49°N 02.79°W | NT5023 |
| Bowithick | Cornwall | 50.60°N 04.57°W | SX1882 |
| Bowker's Green | Lancashire | 53.52°N 02.90°W | SD4004 |
| Bowland Bridge | Cumbria | 54.29°N 02.90°W | SD4189 |
| Bowldown | Wiltshire | 51.49°N 02.11°W | ST9277 |
| Bowlee | Bury | 53.55°N 02.24°W | SD8406 |
| Bowlees | Durham | 54.64°N 02.15°W | NY9028 |
| Bowler's Town | East Sussex | 50.96°N 00.71°E | TQ9122 |
| Bowley | Herefordshire | 52.16°N 02.67°W | SO5452 |
| Bowley Lane | Herefordshire | 52.08°N 02.46°W | SO6843 |
| Bowley Town | Herefordshire | 52.17°N 02.68°W | SO5353 |
| Bowlhead Green | Surrey | 51.13°N 00.70°W | SU9138 |
| Bowling | Bradford | 53.77°N 01.74°W | SE1731 |
| Bowling | West Dunbartonshire | 55.92°N 04.49°W | NS4473 |
| Bowling Alley | Hampshire | 51.23°N 00.86°W | SU7949 |
| Bowling Bank | Wrexham | 53.02°N 02.91°W | SJ3948 |
| Bowling Green | Hampshire | 50.76°N 01.59°W | SZ2996 |
| Bowling Green (Callington) | Cornwall | 50.50°N 04.31°W | SX3670 |
| Bowling Green (Treverbyn) | Cornwall | 50.38°N 04.78°W | SX0258 |
| Bowling Green | Sandwell | 52.47°N 02.08°W | SO9486 |
| Bowling Green | Worcestershire | 52.15°N 02.27°W | SO8151 |
| Bowling Green | Gloucestershire | 51.71°N 01.97°W | SP0202 |
| Bowling Green | Shropshire | 52.82°N 02.56°W | SJ6225 |
| Bowlish | Somerset | 51.18°N 02.55°W | ST6143 |
| Bowmans | Kent | 51.43°N 00.18°E | TQ5273 |
| Bowmanstead | Cumbria | 54.35°N 03.09°W | SD2996 |
| Bowmore | Argyll and Bute | 55.74°N 06.28°W | NR3159 |
| Bowness-on-Solway | Cumbria | 54.94°N 03.21°W | NY2262 |
| Bowness-on-Windermere | Cumbria | 54.35°N 02.92°W | SD4096 |
| Bow of Fife | Fife | 56.29°N 03.10°W | NO3212 |
| Bowridge Hill | Dorset | 51.04°N 02.27°W | ST8127 |
| Bowriefauld | Angus | 56.62°N 02.80°W | NO5148 |
| Bowring Park | Liverpool | 53.39°N 02.87°W | SJ4289 |
| Bowsden | Northumberland | 55.66°N 02.01°W | NT9941 |
| Bowsey Hill | Berkshire | 51.51°N 00.84°W | SU8080 |
| Bowshank | Scottish Borders | 55.65°N 02.87°W | NT4541 |
| Bowston | Cumbria | 54.35°N 02.78°W | SD4996 |
| Bow Street | Ceredigion | 52.43°N 04.03°W | SN6284 |
| Bow Street | Norfolk | 52.53°N 00.96°E | TM0197 |
| Bowthorpe | Norfolk | 52.63°N 01.20°E | TG1709 |
| Bowyer's Common | Hampshire | 51.02°N 00.91°W | SU7626 |

=== Box ===
| Location | Locality | Coordinates (links to map & photo sources) | OS grid reference |
|---|---|---|---|
| Box | Gloucestershire | 51.69°N 02.20°W | SO8600 |
| Box | Wiltshire | 51.41°N 02.26°W | ST8268 |
| Boxbush | Gloucestershire | 51.87°N 02.48°W | SO6720 |
| Box End | Bedfordshire | 52.12°N 00.54°W | TL0048 |
| Boxford | Suffolk | 52.02°N 00.85°E | TL9640 |
| Boxford | Berkshire | 51.43°N 01.39°W | SU4271 |
| Boxgrove | West Sussex | 50.85°N 00.72°W | SU9007 |
| Box Hill | Wiltshire | 51.41°N 02.24°W | ST8369 |
| Box Hill | Surrey | 51.24°N 00.29°W | TQ1951 |
| Boxley | Kent | 51.29°N 00.53°E | TQ7758 |
| Boxmoor | Hertfordshire | 51.74°N 00.49°W | TL0406 |
| Box's Shop | Cornwall | 50.78°N 04.54°W | SS2101 |
| Boxted | Suffolk | 52.12°N 00.65°E | TL8251 |
| Boxted Heath | Essex | 51.94°N 00.90°E | TM0031 |
| Boxted | Essex | 51.96°N 00.89°E | TL9933 |
| Boxted Cross | Essex | 51.95°N 00.90°E | TM0032 |
| Box Trees | Solihull | 52.36°N 01.79°W | SP1474 |
| Boxwell | Gloucestershire | 51.62°N 02.27°W | ST8192 |
| Boxworth | Cambridgeshire | 52.25°N 00.03°W | TL3464 |
| Boxworth End | Cambridgeshire | 52.28°N 00.01°W | TL3667 |

=== Boy ===
| Location | Locality | Coordinates (links to map & photo sources) | OS grid reference |
|---|---|---|---|
| Boyatt Wood | Hampshire | 50.97°N 01.37°W | SU4420 |
| Boyden End | Suffolk | 52.16°N 00.52°E | TL7355 |
| Boyden Gate | Kent | 51.34°N 01.18°E | TR2265 |
| Boyland Common | Norfolk | 52.41°N 01.05°E | TM0884 |
| Boylestone | Derbyshire | 52.91°N 01.73°W | SK1835 |
| Boylestonfield | Derbyshire | 52.92°N 01.73°W | SK1836 |
| Boyndie | Aberdeenshire | 57.65°N 02.60°W | NJ6463 |
| Boyn Hill | Berkshire | 51.51°N 00.74°W | SU8780 |
| Boynton | East Riding of Yorkshire | 54.09°N 00.27°W | TA1368 |
| Boysack | Angus | 56.63°N 02.62°W | NO6249 |
| Boys Hill | Dorset | 50.88°N 02.47°W | ST6710 |
| Boys Village | The Vale Of Glamorgan | 51.39°N 03.41°W | ST0267 |
| Boythorpe | Derbyshire | 53.22°N 01.44°W | SK3770 |
| Boyton | Cornwall | 50.69°N 04.39°W | SX3191 |
| Boyton | Suffolk | 52.07°N 01.45°E | TM3747 |
| Boyton | Wiltshire | 51.15°N 02.07°W | ST9539 |
| Boyton Cross | Essex | 51.75°N 00.38°E | TL6509 |
| Boyton End | Essex | 51.96°N 00.35°E | TL6232 |
| Boyton End | Suffolk | 52.06°N 00.49°E | TL7144 |

=== Boz ===
| Location | Locality | Coordinates (links to map & photo sources) | OS grid reference |
|---|---|---|---|
| Bozeat | Northamptonshire | 52.21°N 00.68°W | SP9058 |
| Bozen Green | Hertfordshire | 51.92°N 00.03°E | TL4027 |
