= Bowman =

Bowman or Bowmans may refer to:

== Places ==
=== Antarctica ===
- Bowman Coast
- Bowman Island
- Bowman Peninsula

=== Australia ===
- Bowman Park, a park in South Australia
- Bowmans, South Australia, a locality
- Division of Bowman, an electoral district for the Australian House of Representatives
- See also Bomen, New South Wales

=== Canada ===
- Bowman, Quebec, a village and municipality
- Bowman Bay (Nunavut)

=== United Kingdom ===
- Bowmans, Kent, a village in England

=== United States ===
- Bowman, Arkansas, an unincorporated community
- Bowman, California, an unincorporated community
- Bowman, Georgia, a city
- Bowman, Indiana, an unincorporated community
- Bowman County, North Dakota
  - Bowman, North Dakota, a city and county seat
- Bowman Creek, a tributary of the Susquehanna River in Pennsylvania
- Bowman, South Carolina, a town
- Bowman, Tennessee, a census-designated place and unincorporated community
- Bowman Bay (Washington)

== People ==
- Bowman (surname)

== Arts and entertainment ==
- "The Bowmans", a 1961 episode of the BBC television situation comedy Hancock
- David Bowman, protagonist of the film 2001: A Space Odyssey
- "The Bowman", the fictional character Shumpert in The Walking Dead television series

== Other uses ==
- Bowman (brand), a brand of trading cards
- Bowman baronets
- Bowman (communications system)
- Bowman flag
- Bowmans (law firm)
- Bowman Hotel (Nogales, Arizona)
- Bowman Hotel (Pendleton, Oregon)
- Bowman (rowing)
- Bowman (barley cultivar)
- Bowman, a person who practices archery

== See also ==
- Bowman Branch (disambiguation)
- Bowman Dam (disambiguation)
- Bowman Field (disambiguation)
- Bowman House (disambiguation)
