= Harriet Mary Ford =

Canadian artist (1859–1938)

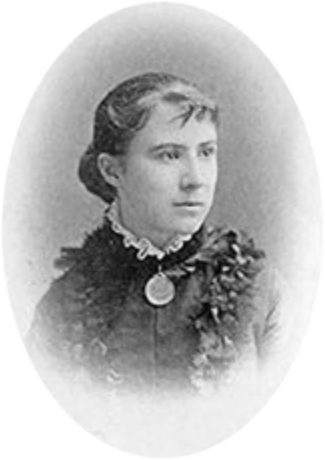
- Harriet Mary Ford, 1878
- Born: 1859; Brockville, Canada West
- Died: October 31, 1938; Bovingdon Green, Marlow, Buckinghamshire, England
- Occupation(s): Artist, Critic, Lecturer, Writer
- Known for: Painter, Muralist, Jeweler

External videos
- Julia McArthur and Johanna Amos, “An Enigmatic Likeness: A Posy for Harriet Ford (1859–1938)”, CWAHI Concordia University

Harriet Mary Ford or simply Harriet Ford (1859 – 31 October 1938) was a Canadian artist who worked as a painter, muralist and jeweller. She has been described as epitomizing "the Canadian New Woman". Ford was active as a critic, writer, and lecturer, and was known in academic circles as an authority on Renaissance art and artists. Ford belonged to a number of societies and organizations and founded the Society of Mural Decorators in 1894.

== Early life ==
Ford was born in Brockville, Canada West in 1859. Her father was a barrister, David B. Ogden Ford. After being orphaned at the age of ten, Ford was educated at a private Anglican school for girls, the Bishop Strachan School, from 1870 to 1878.

== Education and travels ==
Ford studied at the Central Ontario School of Art in Toronto, Ontario, Canada, the St John's Wood Art School, and the Royal Academy in London, England. In France, she studied at the Académie Colarossi in Paris and with Luc-Olivier Merson and Joseph Blanc. Ford also completed a residence in Italy as part of her training, before focusing on her work as a muralist, painter and jewellery maker.

Ford spent much of her life traveling, visiting countries such as Italy, Spain and England, and living intermittently in Canada and England. During her time spent in England, Ford shared a cottage with her fellow artists Edith Hayes and Sydney Strickland Tully in Newlyn and Bovingdon Green, Great Marlow, Buckinghamshire. Although she frequented Newlyn and many other parts of England, Ford preferred passing her time in St. Ives. Ford began to express new ideas and attitudes towards art after her many travels throughout Europe, thus prompting critics to brand her as "dangerous."

Ford worked full-time as a writer, lecturer and artist. She was unmarried, professionally focused and financially independent, and has been described as epitomizing "the Canadian New Woman". Such a position had both benefits and drawbacks. After winning the 1896 poster competition for the Toronto Horse Show, Ford was attacked by an anonymous critic in Saturday Night magazine, who derided both the poster's design of a woman on a horse and the very idea of the "New Woman".

With her international experience, Ford was a supporter of the idea that Canadian artists should be free to find inspiration wherever they wished. In J. Russell Harper's Painting in Canada: A History, he said that Ford stated that she did not believe that the depiction of Canadian scenes was essential for participation in the Canadian school of art.

== Career as an artist ==
=== Painter ===
Ford’s work is in such public collections as the National Gallery of Canada, the Art Gallery of Ontario and the Art Gallery of Hamilton.

In painting, Ford worked primarily in oil paint, watercolour, and pastel. She displayed her work at numerous locations including the Royal Canadian Academy and the Paris Salon. During the Royal Canadian Academy Exhibition of 1895, Ford displayed four of her own pieces, including Girl in White, Annunciation, a decorative oil panel and a self-portrait.

In 1896, Ford won a competition for the design of a horse show poster, beating out several notable Montreal artists. The work, printed in red, yellow, blue, and black, was later shown in an art exhibition in Montreal, where it reportedly was criticized for its break from formalist traditions. However, many of these criticisms acknowledged how Ford intentionally disregarded these conventions about colour and perspective, and that it was not due to a lack of skill or formal training. The poster was also mailed out to members of the artistic community for their personal collections.

While living abroad, Ford also made sketches of the various locations she saw on her travels. She sent these sketches back to Canada, and one was included in an issue of Canadian Magazine in 1896.

=== Muralist ===
Ford's work in house decoration included furniture, screens, and murals, but few examples of this work remain. Ford was interested in murals as early as 1895, when she spoke about the subject during a lecture in Toronto. Ford was one of the few female Canadian artists at the time to receive commercial commissions to create murals. She was commissioned to create murals in the private homes of wealthy patrons such as Charles Porteous, James Mavor and in public institutions such as Saint John's Convalescent Hospital in Toronto, where she was commissioned to create her mural "Mother and Child." She was a member of the Canadian Mural Decorator's Society, and in 1898 collaborated on an unsuccessful project to decorate Toronto's Union Station with a mural of Canadian railway builders at work.

=== Jeweller ===
Between 1908 and 1912, Ford began to work as a jewellery designer and metal smith. Ford likely received instruction on jewellery making from the Arts and Crafts Movement during her time spent in England. Ford began working with silver, but eventually progressed towards incorporating gold within her pieces. Like many jewellery makers associated with the Arts and Crafts Movement, Ford integrated semi-precious stones, such as cabochons, turquoise, mother of pearl, baroque pearls, and river pearls. Her work was featured in a 2001 exhibition at the Art Gallery of Hamilton. Some of her jewellery was included in the exhibition Artists, Architects & Artisans: Canadian Art 1890-1918 at the National Gallery of Canada in Ottawa, Ontario in 2013.

== Social and academic presence ==
In the late 1890s, Ford delivered several lectures based on her studies in Italy. These lectures were well-attended, necessitating on one occasion the relocation to a larger room in order to seat all those attending. Ford’s lectures were based on her studies of early Renaissance art and artists, a subject on which she was considered an authority. Ford delivered her first lecture on Giotto and his followers to the Ontario Society of Artists on March 19, 1895. During this lecture, Ford was described as a "competent lecturer" who engaged the audience with interesting discussions. Ford referred to other academics in her lectures, including art historian John Ruskin, but also discussed her own research.

Ford also is quoted above the state of Canadian art in publications, such as J. Russell Harper's Painting in Canada: A History. In this publication, Ford is said to have stated that she did not believe the depiction of Canadian scenes was essential for the creation of or participation in the Canadian school of art.

Together with George Agnew Reid and Carl Ahrens, Ford founded Tarot magazine in 1896 and acted as an editor for this magazine dedicated to the Arts and Crafts Movement.

== Affiliations ==
Ford belonged to many societies and academies, including the Royal Canadian Academy of Arts of which she was an Associate (1895-1899), the Palette Club, the Ontario Society of Artists, the Women’s International Art Club and was a founder of the Society of Mural Decorators in 1894.

== Death and legacy ==
Ford died in Great Marlow, Buckinghamshire, England on October 10, 1938. Many of her works are in the National Gallery of Canada, The Art Gallery of Ontario, and the Art Gallery of Hamilton.

== Works ==
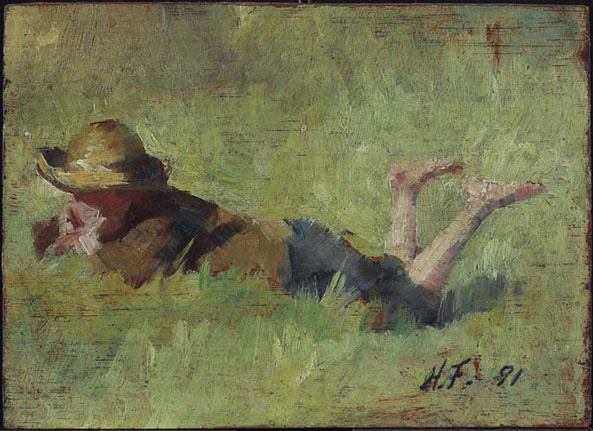
Harriet Mary Ford, Boy Lying in Grass (1890)

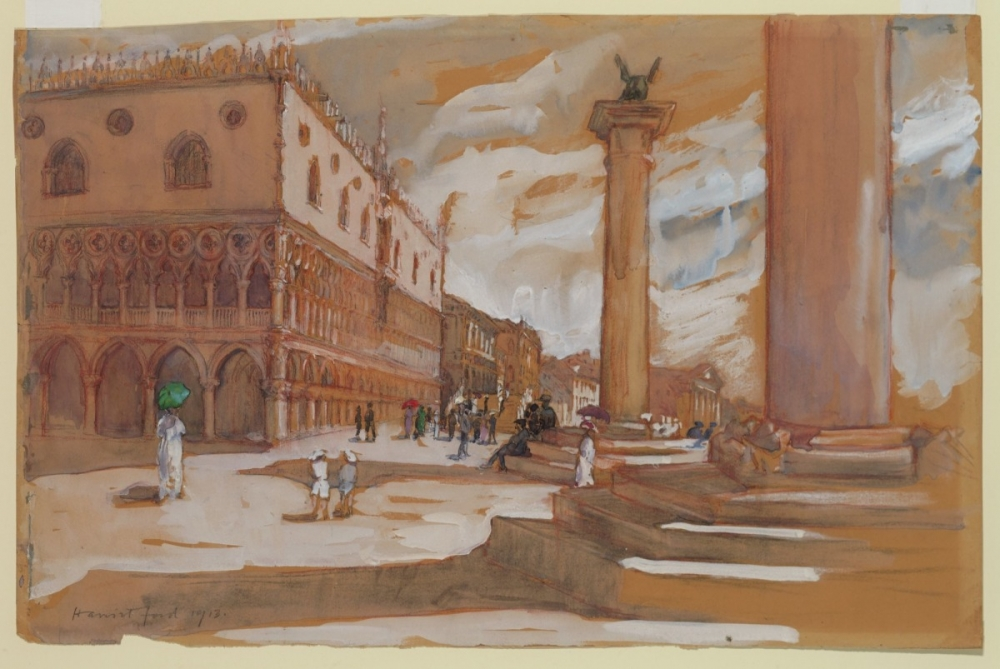
Harriet Mary Ford, Piazzetta (1913)

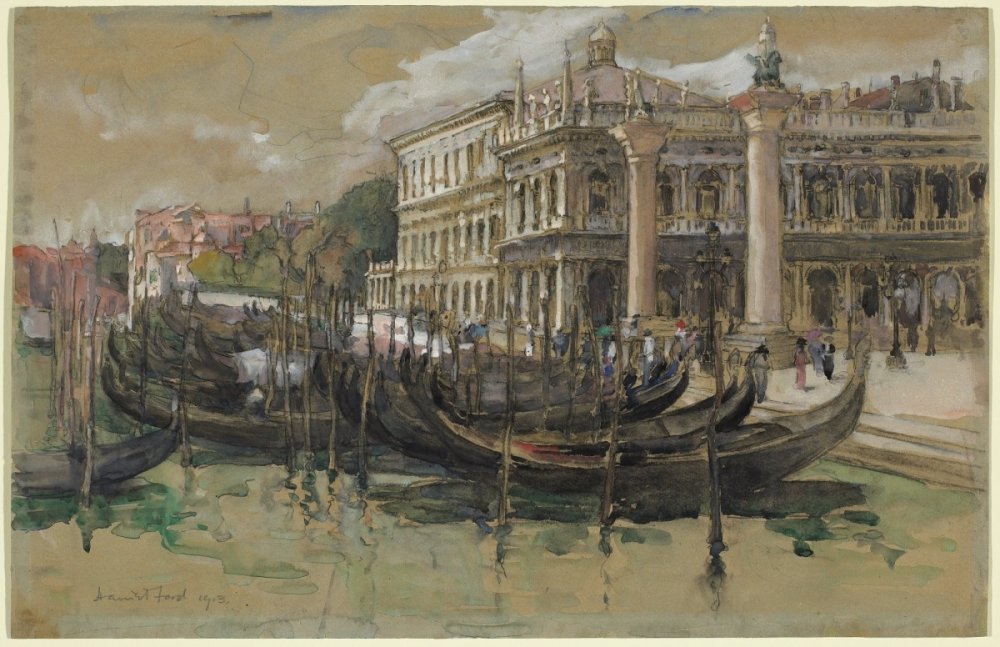
Harriet Mary Ford, Gondolas (1913)

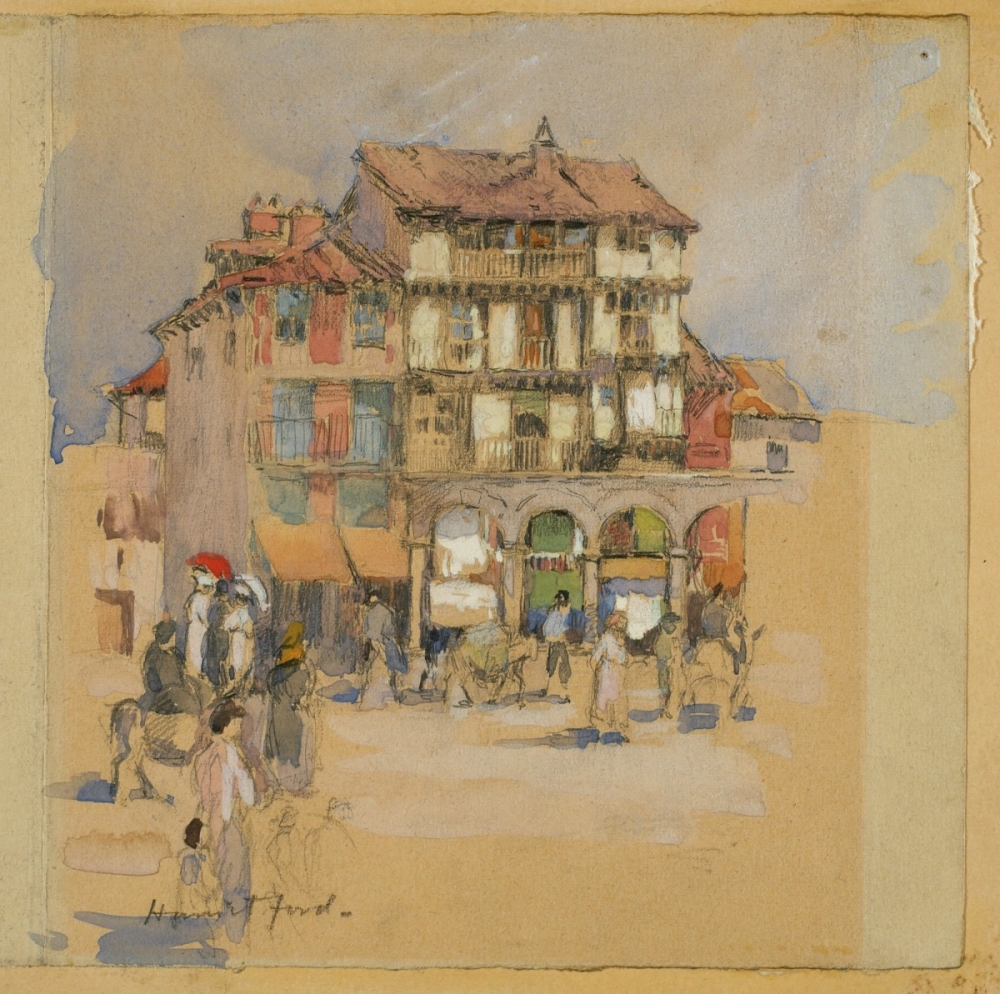
Harriet Mary Ford, Market Square, Segovia No.1 (1913)

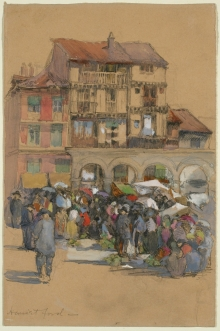
Harriet Mary Ford, Market Square, Segovia, No.2 (1913)

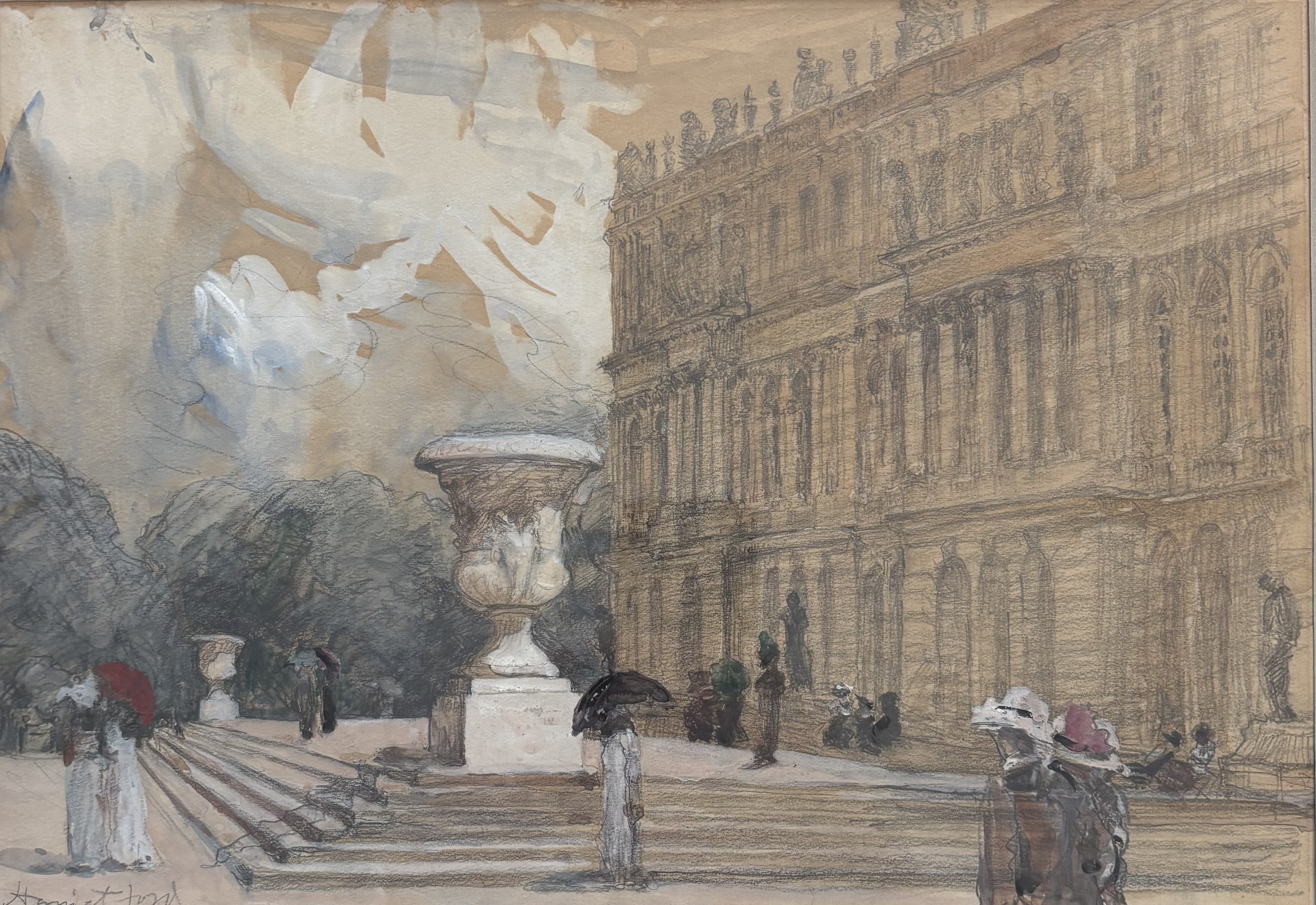
Harriet Mary Ford. Versailles (1912)

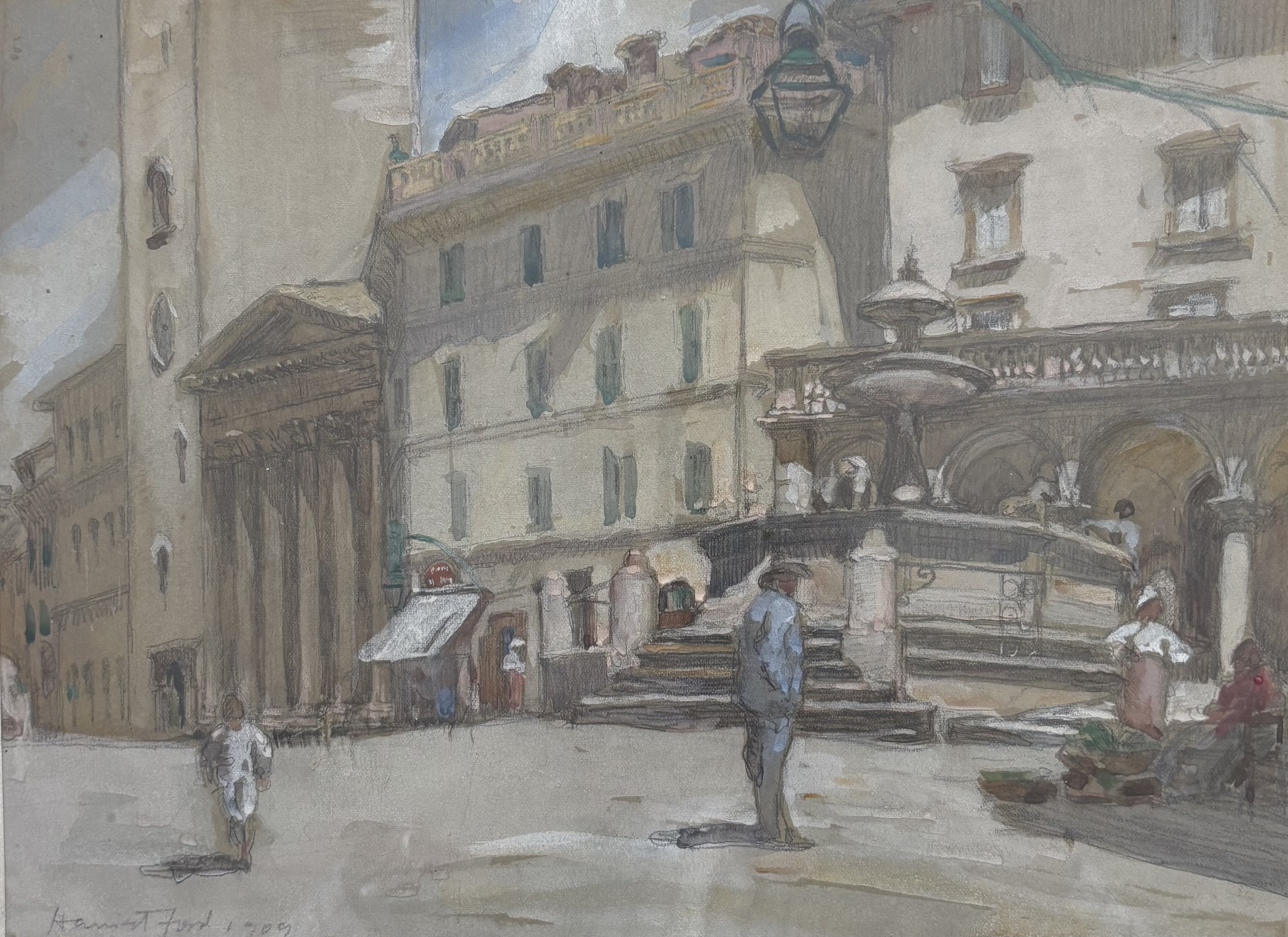
Harriet Mary Ford. Fountain of the Three Lions, Assisi (Italy)(1909)
