= Boundary =

Boundary or Boundaries may refer to:

- Border, in political geography

== Entertainment ==
- Boundaries (2016 film), a Canadian film
- Boundaries (2018 film), an American-Canadian road trip film
- Boundaries (band), an American metalcore band
- Boundary (cricket), the edge of the playing field, or a scoring shot where the ball is hit to or beyond that point
- Boundary (sports), the sidelines of a field
- Boundary (video game), a defunct 2023 multiplayer online game set in outer space

== Mathematics and physics ==
- Boundary (topology), the closure minus the interior of a subset of a topological space; an edge in the topology of manifolds, as in the case of a 'manifold with boundary'
- boundary of a manifold with boundary.
- Boundary (graph theory), the vertices of edges between a subgraph and the rest of a graph
- Boundary (chain complex), its abstractization in chain complexes
- Boundary value problem, a differential equation together with a set of additional restraints called the boundary conditions
- Boundary (thermodynamics), the edge of a thermodynamic system across which heat, mass, or work can flow

== Psychology and sociology ==
- Personal boundaries, a life skill for protecting against having personal values compromised or violated
- Boundaries of the mind, the degree of separateness between fantasy and reality
- Professional boundaries, relationship between any professional and their client
- Symbolic boundaries, a theory of how people form social groups proposed by cultural sociologists
- Boundary-work, sociology of divisions between fields of knowledge

== Places ==
- Boundary, Derbyshire, a hamlet and former civil parish in South Derbyshire and Leicestershire, England
- Boundary, Staffordshire, a village in Staffordshire, England
- Boundary Ranges, also known as the Boundary Range, a mountain range in British Columbia, Canada and Alaska, United States
- Boundary County, ID, the northernmost county in Idaho
- Boundary Country, a region of southern British Columbia, Canada
  - Kootenay Boundary Regional District, a regional district in British Columbia
  - West Kootenay-Boundary, a provincial electoral district in British Columbia
  - Okanagan-Boundary, a former provincial electoral district in British Columbia
  - Boundary-Similkameen, a former provincial electoral district in British Columbia
- Boundary Falls, British Columbia, also known as Boundary, a former railway town in the Boundary Country of British Columbia
- Boundary Waters, a region on the boundary between Ontario and Minnesota
- Stikine, British Columbia, called Boundary from 1930 to 1964, a former customs post on the Stikine River at the Alaska–British Columbia border
- Boundary City, Indiana, a community in the United States

== Other uses ==
- MV Boundary, a number of ships with this name
- Boundaries in landscape history, the divide between areas of differing land used
- Boundary (real estate), the legal boundary between units of real property
- Boundary (company), an American application performance management company
- Boundary critique, a concept about the meaning and validity of propositions
- Boundary turbulence, a break in expectation of how private information is held within a group of knowledge owners
- Boundary Ale, a beer made by Moosehead Breweries
- Geological boundary, a boundary between different geological units
- Boundary, software for secure remote access to systems based on trusted identity developed by HashiCorp

== See also ==
- Boundary representation
- Bound (disambiguation)
- The Boundary (disambiguation)
- Border (disambiguation)
- Demarcation (disambiguation)
