= Bovingdon Green =

Bovingdon Green may refer to:

- Bovingdon Green, Buckinghamshire
- Bovingdon Green, Hertfordshire, a United Kingdom locations
