= Bowman House =

Bowman House, and variations, may refer to:

== United States ==
(by state, then city/town)

- W. G. Bowman House, Nogales, Arizona, listed on the NRHP in Arizona
- William Norman Bowman House-Yamecila, Denver, Colorado, listed on the NRHP in Colorado
- Bowman-Pirkle House, Buford, Georgia, listed on the NRHP in Georgia
- McCormack-Bowman House, Clayton, Indiana, listed on the NRHP in Indiana
- Joseph Bowman Farmhouse, Garrett, Indiana, listed on the NRHP in Indiana
- James W. and Ida G. Bowman House, Marion, Iowa, listed on the NRHP in Iowa
- Col. John Bowman House, Harrodsburg, Kentucky, listed on the NRHP in Kentucky
- Bowman Houses, Lexington, Kentucky, listed on the NRHP in Kentucky
- Bowman House (Dresden, Maine), NRHP-listed
- Bowman House (Boonsboro, Maryland), NRHP-listed
- Jones-Bowman House, Columbiana, Ohio, NRHP-listed
- John and Ellen Bowman House, Portland, Oregon, NRHP-listed
- Bowman's Castle, Brownsville, Pennsylvania, NRHP-listed
- Bowman Homestead, McKeesport, Pennsylvania, NRHP-listed
- Bowman House (Loudon, Tennessee), listed on the NRHP in Tennessee
- Bowman-Chamberlain House, Kanab, Utah, NRHP-listed
- Bowman House (Wisconsin Dells, Wisconsin), NRHP-listed

== Elsewhere ==
- Bowman House, Richmond, New South Wales, Australia
