= Boundary line =

Boundary line may refer to:

- Border, geographic boundaries of political entities or legal jurisdictions
  - Maritime boundary
- An episode of Planetes, see list of Planetes episodes
- Boundary line (sports), the edges of a field

== See also ==
- Boundary (disambiguation)
