= Bowman Hotel =

Bowman Hotel may refer to:

- Bowman Hotel (Nogales, Arizona), listed on the National Register of Historic Places (NRHP) in Arizona
- Bowman Hotel (Pendleton, Oregon), also NRHP-listed
