= The Boundary =

The Boundary may refer to:

- The Boundary (2014 film), a Chinese suspense action crime drama film
- The Boundary, a 2020 Bangladeshi drama film also known as Gondi
- The Boundary (shopping centre), a retail shopping centre in Auckland, New Zealand
- Boundary, Derbyshire, a former civil parish in Derbyshire, England called "The Boundary"

== See also ==
- Boundary (disambiguation)
