= Alexander Bowman =

Alexander or Alex Bowman is the name of:

- Alexander Bowman (Australian politician) (1838–1892), Australian politician
- Alexander Bowman (Irish politician) (1854–1924), Irish politician and trade unionist
- Alexander Hamilton Bowman (1803–1865), American engineer
- Alex Bowman (born 1993), American race car driver

== See also ==
- Bowman (disambiguation)
