= Highlight =

Highlight or Highlights may refer to:

== Generic use ==
- Specular highlight, a spot of light that appears on shiny objects when illuminated by a direct light source
- Hair highlighting, lightening and/or coloring part of someone's hair

== Music ==
- Highlight (band), a South Korean boy group
- Highlights (band), a Swedish dansband

=== Albums ===
- Highlight (album), the third Korean studio album by Beast
- Highlights (Tom Hingley and the Lovers album), 2008
- Highlights (Tanlines album), 2015
- The Highlights, a 2021 greatest hits album by the Weeknd

=== Songs ===
- "Highlight" the theme song for Super Drags, by Pabllo Vittar
- title track "Highlight", South Korean boy group Beast Highlight (album)
- Highlight, a song by South Korean-Japanese girl group Iz One from their 2019 EP Heart*Iz
- "Highlights", a 1998 song by Backyard Babies from Total 13
- "Highlights" (song), a 2016 song by Kanye West
- Highlight, a song by South Korean boy group Enhypen from their 2026 EP The Sin: Bliss

== In technology ==
- Highlighter, a marker pen that adds translucent color to paper, to emphasize particular parts of the text
- In computing, the selection of on-screen text such as preparing for a cut, copy, and paste operation
- Highlight (application), a social networking application
- Highlight (photography), the brightest areas in an image
- Syntax highlighting, the display of text in different colors and/or fonts, depending upon its meaning in context

== Other uses ==
- Highlights, a public page on the Russian social networking site VKontakte
- Highlights FC, Nevisian association football club
- Highlights (magazine), an American children's magazine

== See also ==
- Light (disambiguation)
- High (disambiguation)
- Bright line (disambiguation)
