= Bowman Branch =

Bowman Branch may refer to:

- Bowman Branch (Nodaway River tributary), a stream in Missouri
- Bowman Branch (Texas)

== See also ==
- Bowman (disambiguation)
