= Bright line (disambiguation) =

A bright-line rule is an objective legal standard that does not allow courts to weigh other factors.

Bright line may also refer to:

- Brightline, a rail system in Florida, USA
- Brightline West, a future rail system in the Western US
- Bright railway line, a defunct rail line in Australia
- A Spectral line
- Emission spectrum of a chemical or atom

== See also ==
- Bright (disambiguation)
- Line (disambiguation)
- Demarcation (disambiguation)
- Highlight (disambiguation)
