= Demarcation =

Demarcation is the act of creating a boundary around a place or thing.

Demarcation may also refer to:

- Demarcation line, a temporary border between the countries
- Demarcation problem, the question of which practices of doing science permit the resulting theories to lie within the boundaries of knowledge
- Demarcation dispute, may arise when two different trade unions both claim the right to represent the same class or group of workers
- Demarcation point, in telephony, the point at which the telephone company network ends and connects with the wiring at the customer premises
- Demarcation transactions, starting and ending database transactions using begin, commit, and rollback methods

== See also ==
- Boundary (disambiguation)
- Highlight (disambiguation)
