= Highlight (album) =

Studio album by Beast
- Released: July 4, 2016
- Recorded: 2016
- Genre: K-pop; Ballad
- Length: 44:46
- Label: Cube Entertainment

Beast chronology
Ordinary (2015)	Highlight (2016)	Can You Feel It? (2017)

Singles from Highlight
- 1. "Butterfly" Released: June 27, 2016; 2. "Ribbon" Released: July 4, 2016

Highlight is the third Korean studio album by South Korean boy group, Beast. It was released on July 4, 2016 and is also the group's first Korean release since Hyunseung's departure from the group. It was also the last album under the name "Beast" and under Cube Entertainment.

The album contains 12 tracks including the lead single "Ribbon" and the pre-released track "Butterfly".

== Track listing ==
Highlight track listing
No.	Title	Lyrics	Music	Arrangement	Length
1.	"Highlight" (하이라이트; hailaiteu)	Junhyung	Good Life	Kim Taejoo	3:30
2.	"Ribbon" (리본; ribon)	Junhyung	Good Life	Kim Taejoo	3:55
3.	"Butterfly"	Junhyung	Junhyung; Davii	Davii	3:36
4.	"Practice" (연습 중; yeonseup jung)	Yoseob; Junhyung; Gyuberlake	Yoseob; Gyuberlake	Yoseob; Gyuberlake	3:47
5.	"When I..."	Junhyung	Good Life	Kim Taejoo	3:35
6.	"Curious" (궁금해; gunggeumhae)	Gikwang; Junhyung; Noday	Gikwang; Noday	Noday; Chloe	4:00
7.	"Found You" (Junhyung solo)	Junhyung	Good Life	Good Life	3:27
8.	"Baby It's You" (Doojoon & Gikwang)	Gikwang; Noday	Gikwang; Noday	Noday; Chloe	3:50
9.	"With Me" (나와; nawa; Yoseob solo)	Yoseob; Gyuberlake	Yoseob; Gyuberlake	Yoseob; Gyuberlake	3:37
10.	"I'll Give You My All" (Dongwoon solo)	Dongwoon	Good Life; Davii	Good Life; Davii	3:44
11.	"Lullaby" (잘 자요; jal jayo)	Gikwang; Junhyung; Noday; Chloe	Gikwang; Noday; Chloe	Noday; Chloe	3:50
12.	"Ribbon" (리본; ribon; Instrumental)		Good Life	Kim Taejoo	3:55

== Charts ==
=== Weekly charts ===
Chart (2016)	Peak position
Japanese Albums (Oricon)	52
South Korean Albums (Gaon)	1
US World Albums (Billboard)	9

=== Year-end charts ===
Chart (2016)	Position
South Korean Albums (Gaon)	37
