= Bowman Field (disambiguation) =

Bowman Field is a minor league baseball stadium in Williamsport, Pennsylvania, United States.

Bowman Field may also refer to:

== Airports ==
- Bowman Field (Kentucky), an airport in Louisville, Kentucky
- Bowman Field (Maine), an airport in Livermore Falls, Maine
- Bowman Field (Montana), an airport in Anaconda, Montana
- Bowman Municipal Airport, an airport in Bowman, North Dakota

== Other uses ==
- Bowman Field, a former parade ground in the Clemson University Historic District I at Clemson University
