= Bowyer's Common =

Village in Hampshire, England

Coordinates: 51.02°N 00.91°W

- Location within Hampshire
- OS grid reference: SU7626
- Shire county: Hampshire
- Region: South East
- Country: England
- Sovereign state: United Kingdom
- Police: Hampshire and Isle of Wight
- Fire: Hampshire and Isle of Wight
- Ambulance: South Central

Bowyer's Common is a village in East Hampshire, England. It is located in the East Hampshire district and part of the civil parish of Steep.
