= Bowman Dam =

Bowman Dam can refer to:

- Arthur R. Bowman Dam in Crook County, Oregon
- Bowman Dam (California) in Nevada County, California
- Bowman-Haley Dam in Bowman County, North Dakota
