= John and Ellen Bowman House =

Historic building in Portland, Oregon, U.S.

- U.S. National Register of Historic Places
- U.S. Historic district – Contributing property
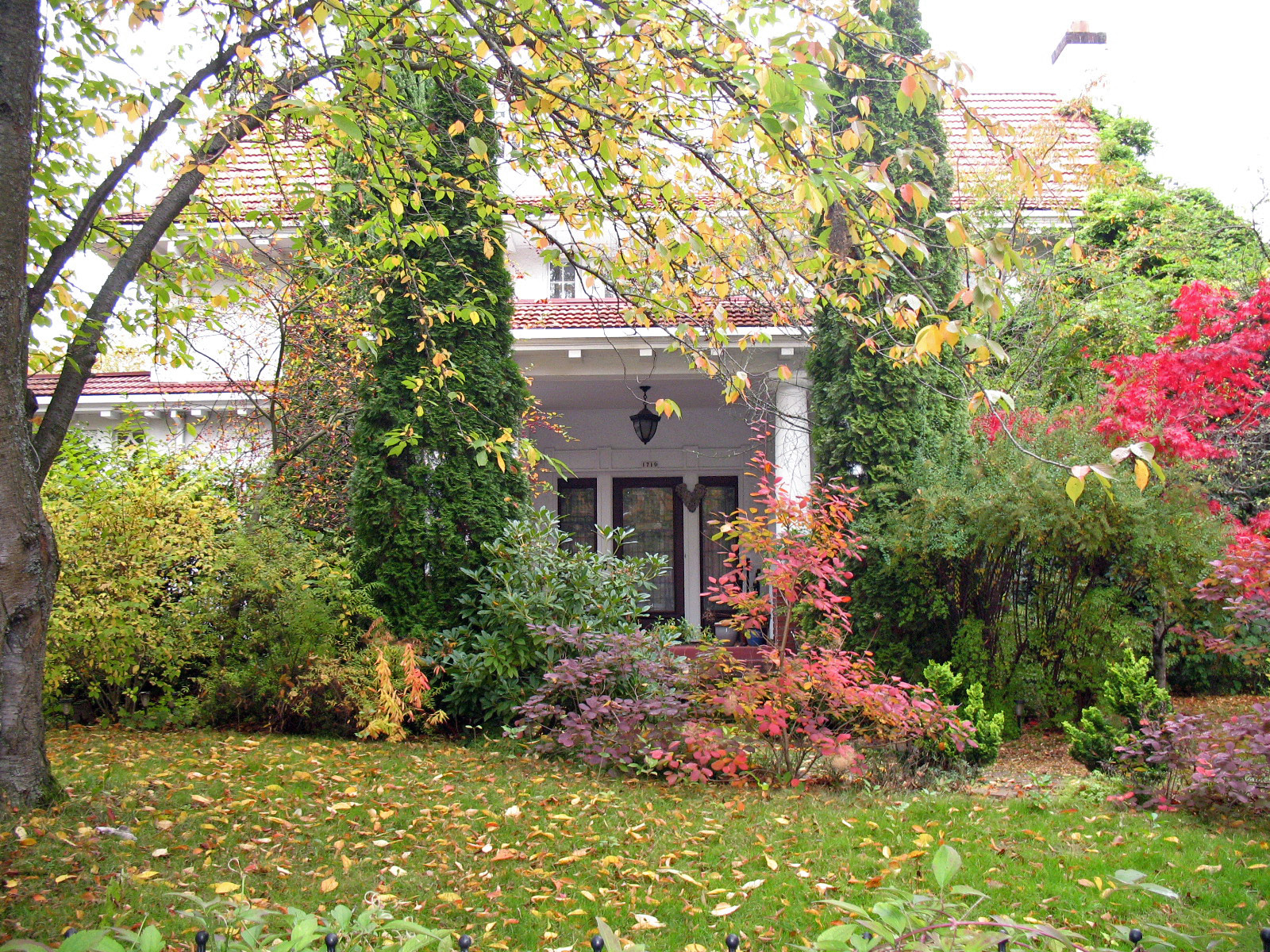
- John and Ellen Bowman House in 2009

- Location within Portland, Oregon Location within Oregon Location within the United States
- Location: 1719 NE Knott Street; Portland, Oregon
- Coordinates: 45°32′33″N 122°38′53″W
- Built: 1915
- Architect: Ellis F. Lawrence
- Architectural style: Colonial Revival
- Part of: Irvington Historic District (ID10000850)
- MPS: Architecture of Ellis F. Lawrence MPS
- NRHP reference No.: 07001377
- Added to NRHP: January 9, 2008

The John and Ellen Bowman House is a house located in northeast Portland, Oregon, United States.

It was built in 1915–16 on six lots and was designed by Ellis F. Lawrence. The house is constructed mostly of concrete block covered with textured stucco and was estimated to cost $35,000.

It is listed on the National Register of Historic Places.

== See also ==
- National Register of Historic Places listings in Northeast Portland, Oregon
