= Bowman, California =

Unincorporated community in California, United States

Bowman
- Unincorporated community
- Location in California Bowman (the United States)
- Coordinates: 38°56′31″N 121°02′51″W
- Country: United States
- State: California
- County: Placer County
- Elevation: 1,617 ft (493 m)

Bowman is an unincorporated community in Placer County, California. Bowman is located on the Southern Pacific Railroad, 3.25 miles (5.2 km) north-northeast of Auburn. It lies at an elevation of 1617 feet (493 m).

The Bowman post office opened in 1893. The name honors Harry Hoisington Bowman, fruit grower.
