= Highlight (application) =

Social networking app

- Screenshot The Highlight application
- Developer: Highlight
- Platform: iOS and Android
- Type: Social Networking
- Website: www.highlig.ht

Highlight was a social networking application for iOS and Android created by Paul Davison. The application finds nearby users and shows things they have in common with a user. The application received a large update which introduced Android support on November 20, 2012. On April 30, 2015, the developers announced a change of focus towards social networking via photo-sharing through their Roll app.

== Criticism ==
Highlight has been criticized for its disclosure of private information to strangers. Highlight requires a connection to both users' Facebook accounts and their location. The difference between Highlight and other services like Foursquare is that it shares information continuously.
