= Bower Heath =

Hamlet in Hertfordshire, England

Coordinates: 51.836°N 00.342°W

- Location within Hertfordshire
- OS grid reference: TL1416
- Shire county: Hertfordshire
- Region: East
- Country: England
- Sovereign state: United Kingdom
- Post town: Harpenden
- Postcode district: AL5
- Police: Hertfordshire
- Fire: Hertfordshire
- Ambulance: East of England

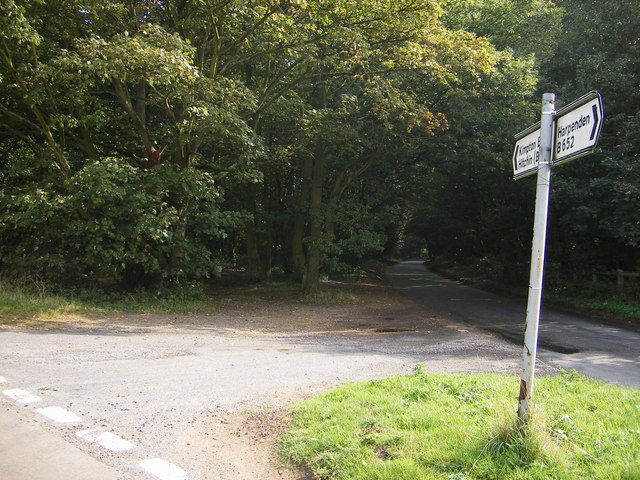
Picture of Bower Heath

Bower Heath is a hamlet in Hertfordshire, England. It is in the civil parish of Harpenden.
