= J. Russell Harper =

Canadian art historian and curator

- Born: John Russell Harper; April 13, 1914; Caledonia, Ontario
- Died: November 17, 1983 (aged 69)
- Known for: pioneer of Canadian art history and curaror
- Spouse: Mary Elizabeth Goodchild
- Awards: honorary Doctor of Literature from the University of Guelph (1972); Doctor of Fine Arts from the Nova Scotia College of Art and Design University (1982); fellow of the Royal Society of Canada (1974); Officer of the Order of Canada (1974)

J. Russell Harper OC FRSC (April 13, 1914 – November 17, 1983) was a Canadian art historian and curator who pioneered the field of Canadian art history. As Robert Fulford said in the Toronto Star: "He did more than anyone else to give Canada a sense of its fine-art tradition".

== Career ==
Harper was born at Caledonia, Ontario and worked for some time as a primary school teacher before studying at the Ontario College of Art from 1938 to 1940. During World War II he served, alongside his future wife Mary Elizabeth Goodchild, as a radar mechanic for the Royal Canadian Air Force in Canada and England. After the war, he enrolled at the University of Toronto and received a B.A. in 1948, and an M.A. in 1950 in art and archeology.

In the 1950s, he became the chief cataloguer of the Royal Ontario Museum, and in 1951, he moved to Saint John, New Brunswick, to work for the New Brunswick Museum. After archaeological fieldwork for the Department of Indian and Northern Affairs Canada, he reported in 1959 on the potential for restoration of the fortress at Louisbourg, Nova Scotia. In 1959, an exhibition was held of his paintings at the University of New Brunswick Art Centre.

From 1959 to 1963, he was the curator of Canadian art at the National Gallery of Canada, and from 1965 to 1968 the chief curator of the McCord Museum of McGill University. From 1965 until his retirement in 1979 he lectured as a professor of art history at Concordia University in Montreal, Quebec.

Beginning in the 1960s, he specialized in the study of Canadian painting. His 1966 Painting in Canada: a History was the first comprehensive overview of the field. Subsequent works include the ground-breaking studies on Paul Kane (Paul Kane's Frontier, 1971) and Cornelius Krieghoff (Krieghoff, 1979). His later interests centred on Canadian folk art.

Harper was a member of the board of the Journal of Canadian Art History from 1974 through 1983, and was awarded an honorary Doctor of Literature from the University of Guelph in 1972 and Doctor of Fine Arts from the Nova Scotia College of Art and Design University in 1982. Among other awards, he was made a fellow of the Royal Society of Canada in 1974; and also in that year became an Officer of the Order of Canada.

After his death, his family gave his library to the National Gallery of Canada where it forms part of the Library and Archives. His fonds is in Library and Archives Canada.

== Selected publications ==
- Painting in Canada: a History, University of Toronto Press, 1966. Reprinted 1977. ISBN 0-8020-6307-1.
- Paul Kane's Frontier, University of Texas Press, Austin, TX; 1971. ISBN 0-292-70110-1.
- A People's Art: Primitive, Naïve, Provincial, and Folk Painting in Canada, University of Toronto Press, 1974. ISBN 0-8020-2153-0 .
- Krieghoff, University of Toronto Press, 1979. ISBN 0-8020-2348-7.
- Early painters and engravers in Canada, University of Toronto Press, 1970;
