= Bowman Homestead =

Historic house in Pennsylvania, United States

- U.S. National Register of Historic Places
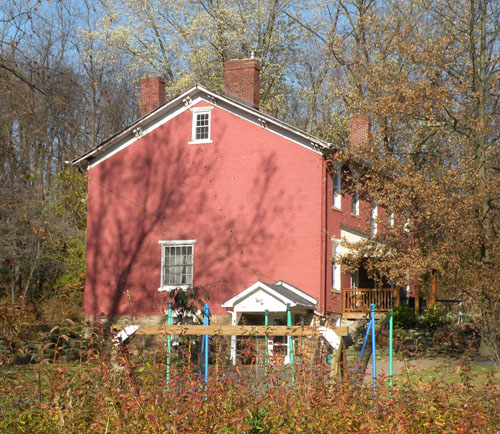

- Location within Pennsylvania Location within the United States
- Nearest city: McKeesport, Pennsylvania
- Coordinates: 40°22′15″N 79°49′32″W
- Area: 8.2 acres (3.3 ha)
- Architect: George Bowman
- Architectural style: Greek Revival, Vernacular Greek Revival
- NRHP reference No.: 79003140
- Added to NRHP: September 07, 1979

The Bowman Homestead in North Versailles Township, Allegheny County, Pennsylvania is a 2 1/2-story brick farmhouse built in 1846 by George Bowman in a combination of the Western Pennsylvania vernacular and Greek Revival styles. Timber for the house was harvested on site, and the bricks were fired nearby.

Bowman moved to Western Pennsylvania in the early 1800s and married Eliza Mellon, the sister of Judge Thomas Mellon and aunt of Andrew Mellon, the future Secretary of the Treasury.

It was listed on the National Register of Historic Places in 1979.
