= Great Marlow =

Civil parish in Buckinghamshire, England

Coordinates: 51.5861°N 0.8042°W

- Location within Buckinghamshire
- Population: 1,321; 1,167 (2011 Census)
- OS grid reference: SU843881
- Civil parish: Great Marlow
- Unitary authority: Buckinghamshire
- Ceremonial county: Buckinghamshire
- Region: South East
- Country: England
- Sovereign state: United Kingdom
- Post town: MARLOW
- Postcode district: SL7
- Dialling code: 01628
- Police: Thames Valley
- Fire: Buckinghamshire
- Ambulance: South Central
- UK Parliament: Beaconsfield

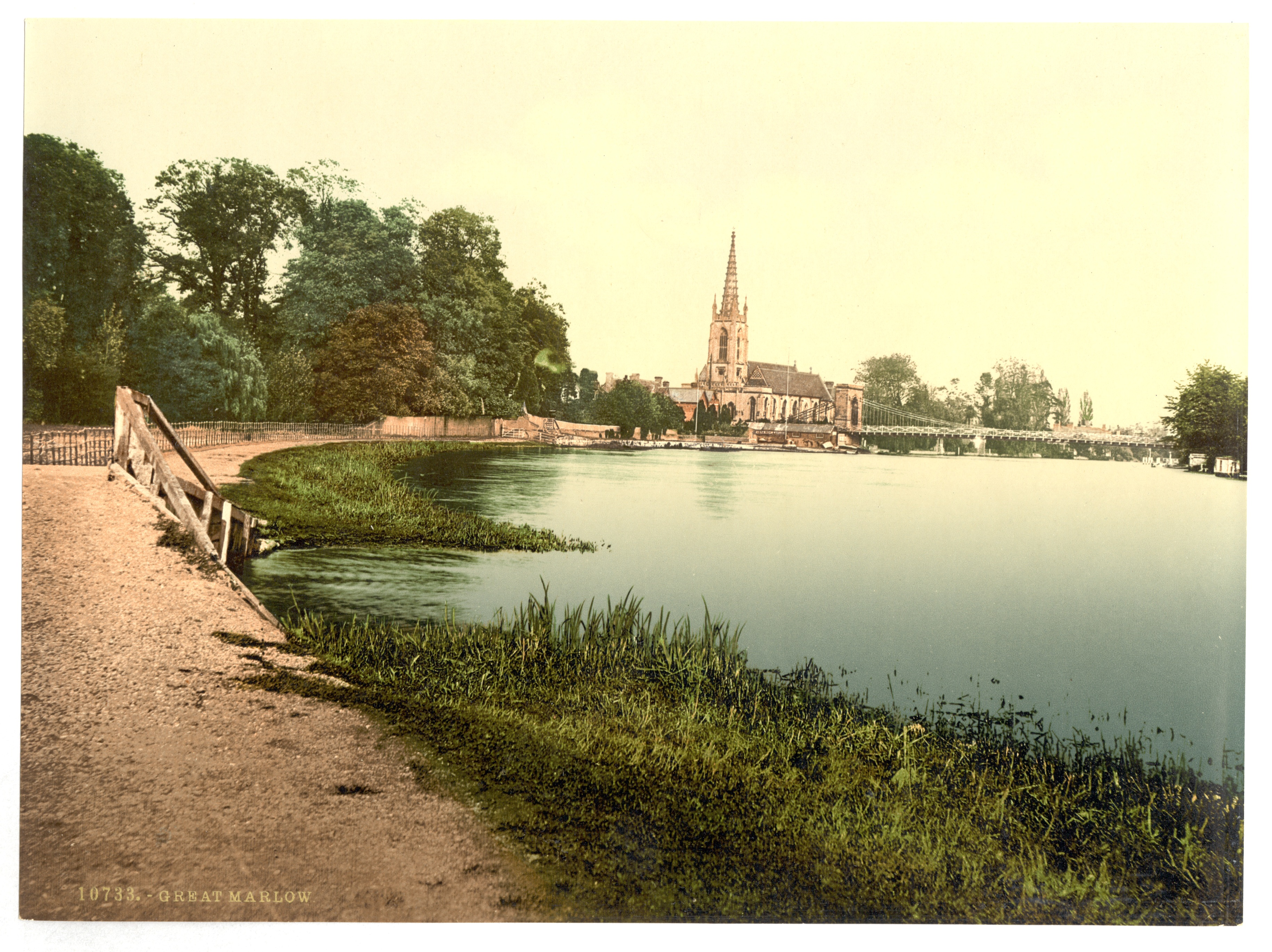

Great Marlow is a civil parish in Buckinghamshire, England, lying north of the town of Marlow and south of High Wycombe. The parish includes the hamlets of Bovingdon Green, Burroughs Grove, Chisbridge Cross and Marlow Common. Prior to November 2007 the major settlement in Great Marlow was Marlow Bottom which has now become a civil parish in its own right.

The parish has been so named since Norman times. The ancient parish of Great Marlow, named to distinguish it from Little Marlow, was large, including the town of Marlow and rural areas north and west of it. The ancient parish became a civil parish in the 19th century, and in 1896 was divided: the town became Great Marlow Urban District (later renamed Marlow Urban District), leaving the rural areas in the parish of Great Marlow. In 1934 Lane End, in the far north of the parish, was transferred from Great Marlow to the parish of Fingest.

The ecclesiastical parish of Great Marlow, which includes the town of Marlow, is now united with the parishes of Marlow Bottom, Little Marlow and Bisham (in Berkshire).

== See also ==
- Great Marlow (UK Parliament constituency)
