= Boughrood Brest =

Coordinates: 52.039°N 3.244°W

Boughrood Brest: Welsh: Brest Bochrwyd
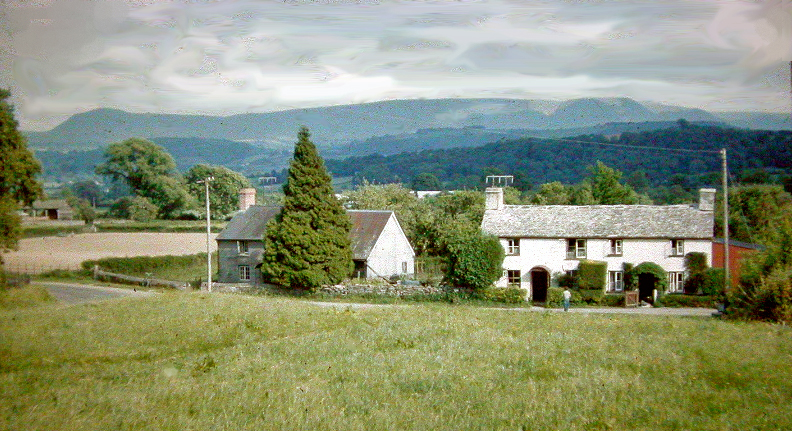

- Location within Powys
- OS grid reference: SO 1479 3856
  - Cardiff: 39 mi (63 km)
  - London: 138 mi (222 km)
- Community: Glasbury
- Principal area: Powys
- Country: Wales
- Sovereign state: United Kingdom
- Post town: BRECON
- Postcode district: LD3
- Police: Dyfed-Powys
- Fire: Mid and West Wales
- Ambulance: Welsh
- UK Parliament: Brecon, Radnor and Cwm Tawe
- Senedd Cymru – Welsh Parliament: Brecon and Radnorshire

Boughrood Brest (Welsh: Brest Bochrwyd) is a settlement in the community of Glasbury, Powys, Wales. It lies close to the northern bank of the River Wye, between Boughrood itself and Glasbury. The meaning of the name "Brest" is unknown.

== See also ==
- List of localities in Wales by population
