= Bowbeck =

Hamlet in Suffolk, England

Coordinates: 52.342°N 0.850°E

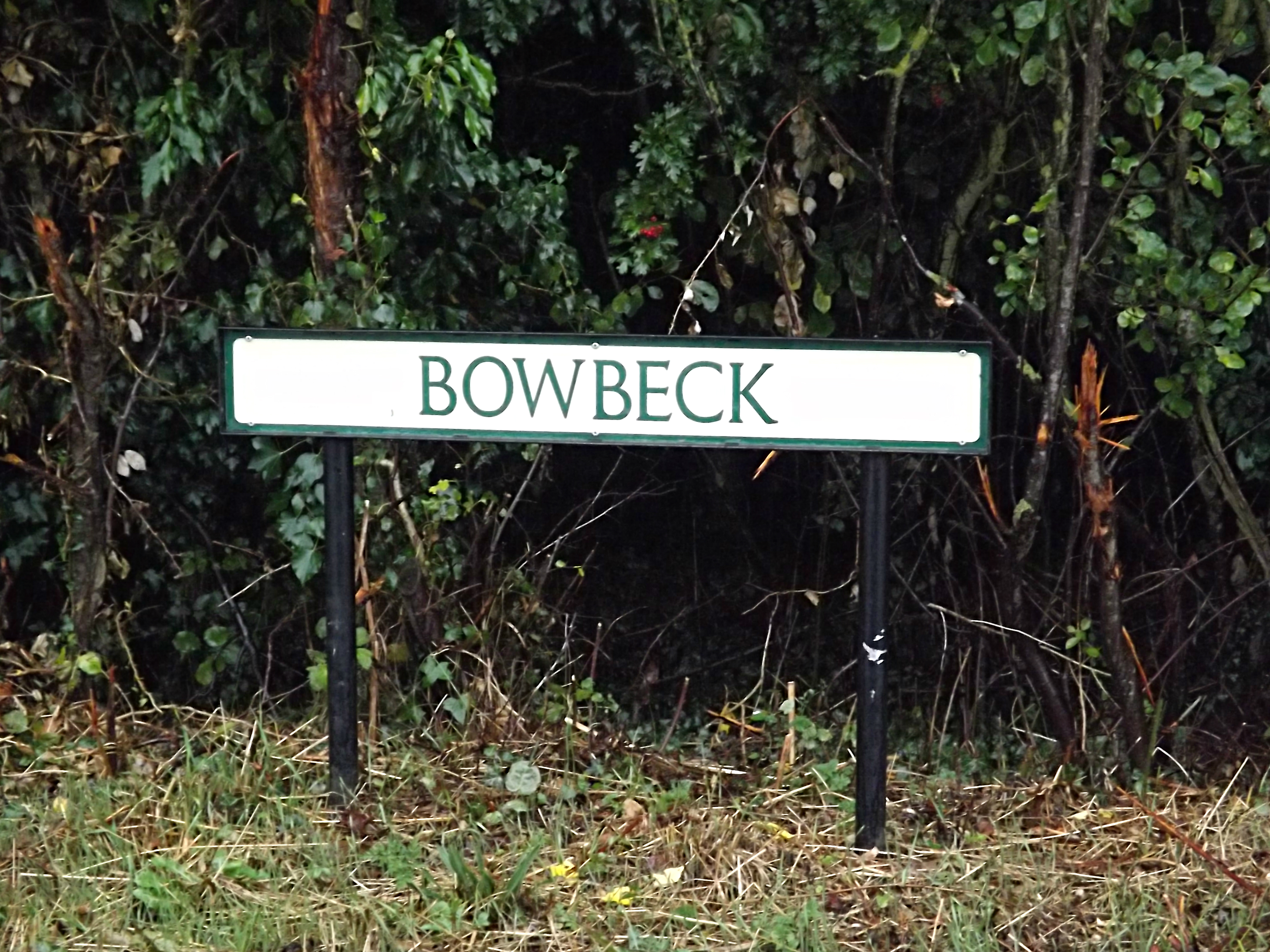

- Location within Suffolk
- OS grid reference: TL9475
- Shire county: Suffolk
- Region: East
- Country: England
- Sovereign state: United Kingdom
- Police: Suffolk
- Fire: Suffolk
- Ambulance: East of England

Bowbeck is a hamlet in Suffolk, England.
