= MV Boundary =

A number of motor vessels have been named Boundary, including:

- MV Boundary (1942), a Panaminan ship in service 1970–72
- MV Boundary (1993), a Marshallese ship in current service
