= Bowman House (Wisconsin Dells, Wisconsin) =

Historic house in Wisconsin, United States

- U.S. National Register of Historic Places
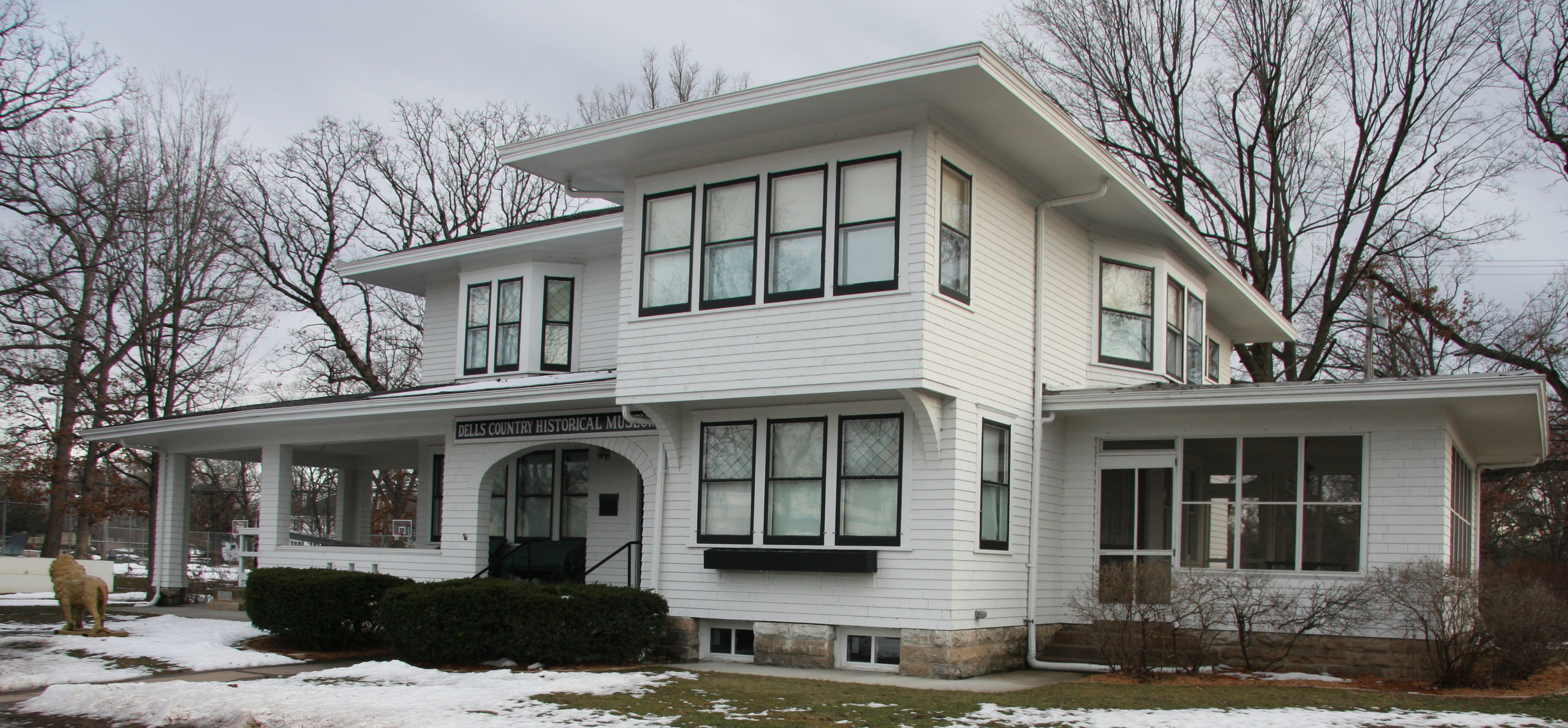
- The Bowman House in 2013

- Location within Wisconsin Location within the United States
- Location: 714 Broadway St., Wisconsin Dells, Wisconsin
- Coordinates: 43°37′38″N 89°46′2″W
- Area: less than one acre
- Built: 1904
- Architectural style: Prairie School
- NRHP reference No.: 86000621
- Added to NRHP: April 3, 1986

The Bowman House is a historic house located at 714 Broadway Street in Wisconsin Dells, Wisconsin. The Prairie School house was built in 1904 for Abram and Alberta Bowman. The house has a Prairie School design, popular at the time due to Frank Lloyd Wright's influence; its distinctive Prairie School elements include a horizontal emphasis and a low roof with wide eaves. Abram Bowman died in 1907, and his daughters Emma and Jennie Bowman inherited the house. Jennie Bowman had the house converted to a vacation home for working women upon her death in 1934. The house remained a vacation home until 1977, when the Dells Country Historical Society converted it to a historic house museum.

The house was added to the National Register of Historic Places on April 3, 1986.

== See also ==
- National Register of Historic Places listings in Wisconsin
