= Bowmanstead =

Village in Cumbria, England

Coordinates: 54.35°N 03.09°W

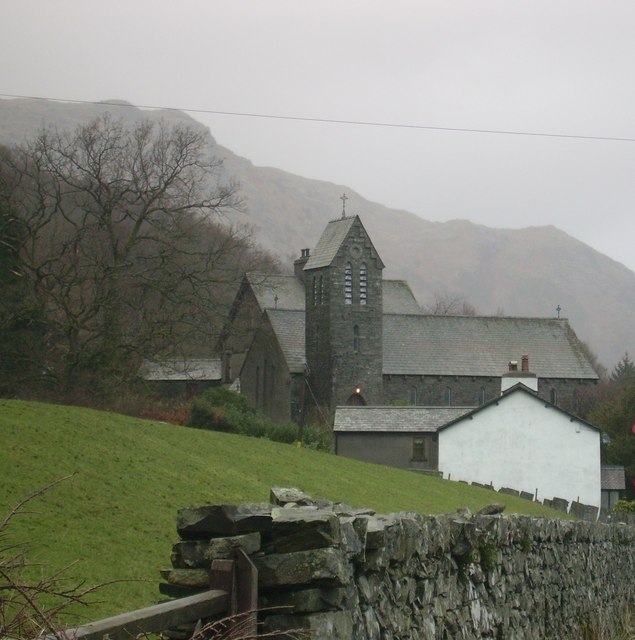
- The church at Bowmanstead

- Location in South Lakeland Location within Cumbria
- OS grid reference: SD2996
- Civil parish: Coniston
- Unitary authority: Westmorland and Furness
- Ceremonial county: Cumbria
- Region: North West
- Country: England
- Sovereign state: United Kingdom
- Post town: CONISTON
- Postcode district: LA21
- Dialling code: 01539
- Police: Cumbria
- Fire: Cumbria
- Ambulance: North West
- UK Parliament: Westmorland and Lonsdale

Bowmanstead is a village in Cumbria, England. It is situated 1 mile to the south of Coniston and contains a Catholic church and a pub - The Ship Inn, it is located next to Haws Bank.

To the west of Bowmanstead lies the old Coniston to Foxfield railway line, which is now a footpath leading to the village of Coniston in the north and Torver in the south.
