= Boxbush =

Village in Gloucestershire, England

Coordinates: 51.87°N 02.48°W

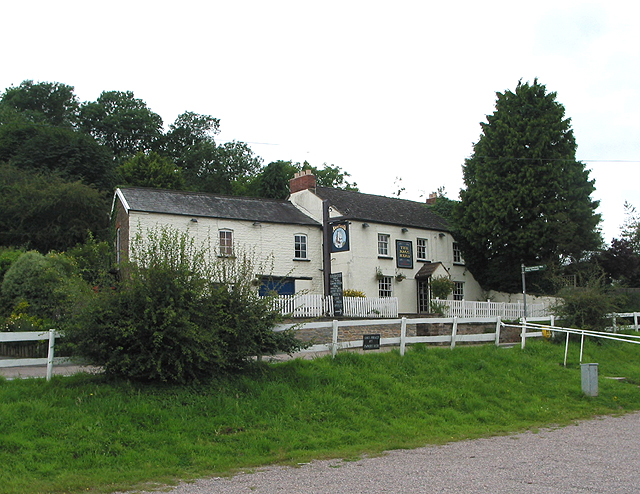
- The Nag's Head in Boxbush

- Location within Gloucestershire
- OS grid reference: SO6720
- Shire county: Gloucestershire
- Region: South West
- Country: England
- Sovereign state: United Kingdom
- Police: Gloucestershire
- Fire: Gloucestershire
- Ambulance: South Western

Boxbush is a village in Gloucestershire, England, which is 5 miles (8 km) south-west of Newent.
