= Bowman Branch (Texas) =

Stream in Tarrant County, Texas, U.S.

Coordinates: 32°37′12″N 97°03′44″W

Bowman Branch is a stream in Tarrant County, Texas.

== Description ==
The stream rises in north Mansfield, flowing to the east, lending its name to the Bowman Branch Linear Park. The stream passes under Texas State Highway 360 before meeting Joe Pool Lake near Grand Prairie.

== See also ==
- List of rivers of Texas
