= Boundary, Staffordshire =

Village in Staffordshire, England

Coordinates: 52.97°N 02.03°W

Boundary
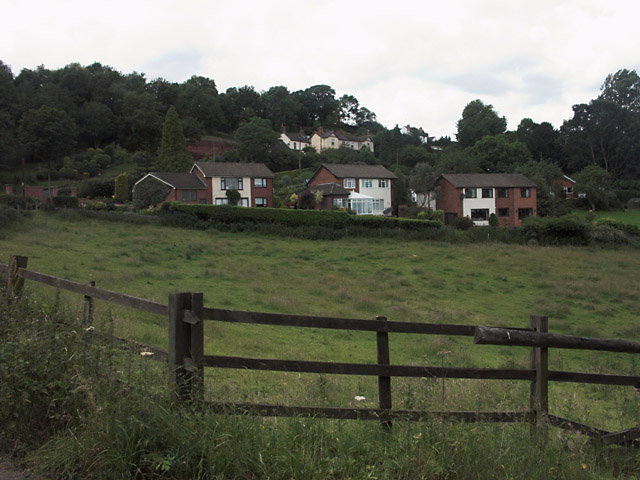

- Location within Staffordshire
- OS grid reference: SJ9842
- Civil parish: Forsbrook
- District: Staffordshire Moorlands
- Shire county: Staffordshire
- Region: West Midlands
- Country: England
- Sovereign state: United Kingdom
- Post town: Stoke-on-Trent
- Postcode district: ST10
- Police: Staffordshire
- Fire: Staffordshire
- Ambulance: West Midlands

Boundary is a village in the civil parish of Forsbrook, in the Staffordshire Moorlands district, in the county of Staffordshire, England, near to the town of Cheadle. It is just outside of the city of Stoke-on-Trent.
