= Bowman Hotel (Nogales, Arizona) =

- U.S. National Register of Historic Places
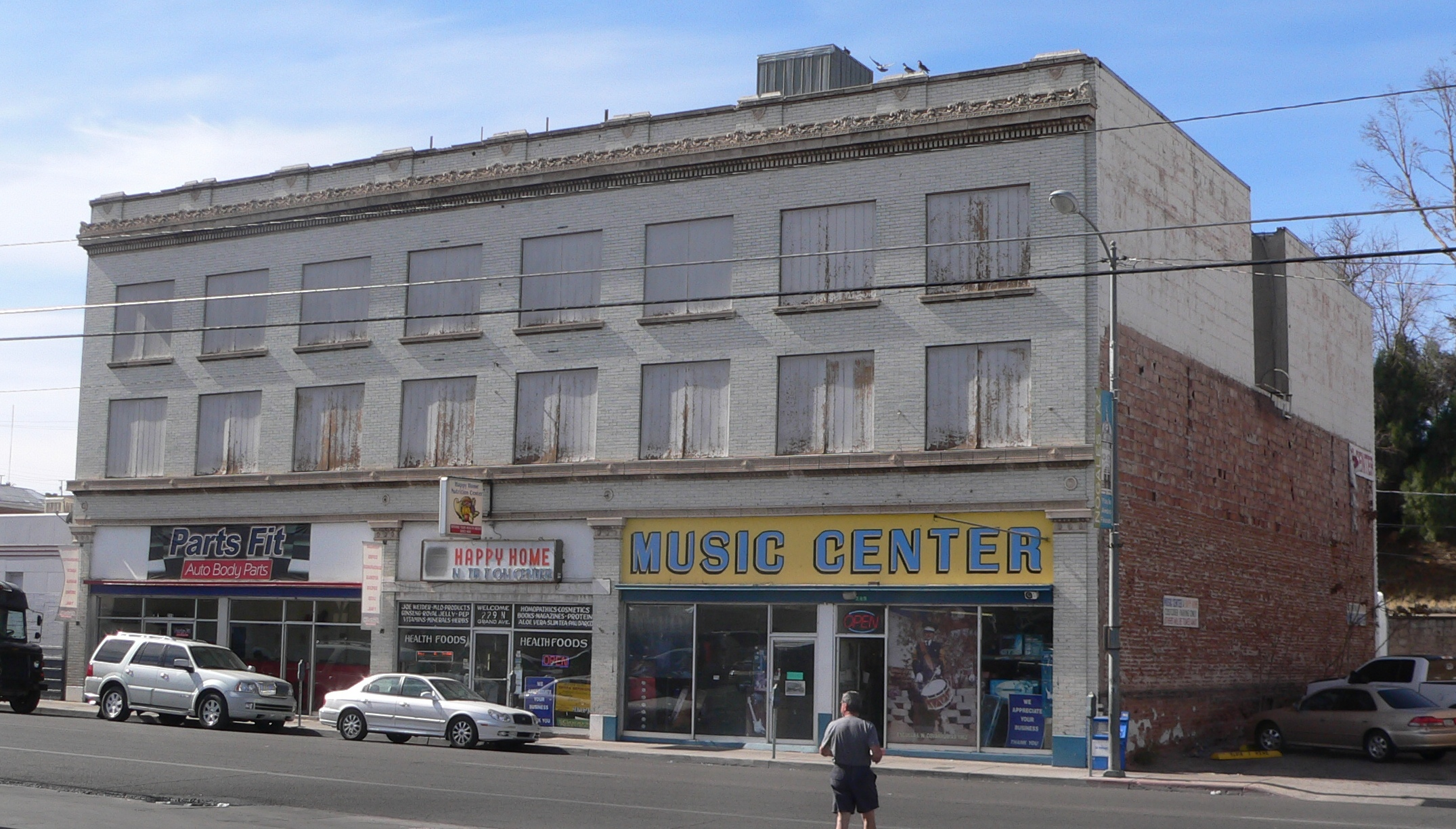

- Location within Arizona Location within the United States
- Location: 245 Grand Ave., Nogales, Arizona
- Coordinates: 31°20′13″N 110°56′24″W
- Built: 1917
- Architect: William Bray
- Architectural style: Chicago, Commercial
- MPS: Nogales MRA
- NRHP reference No.: 85001852
- Added to NRHP: August 29, 1985

Bowman Hotel in Nogales, Arizona was built in 1917. It was listed on the National Register of Historic Places in 1985.

It was then the oldest hotel building surviving in Nogales. It was deemed significant in its use of fired (glazed) brick in its facade, being one of only two buildings in Nogales with that. It is associated with Wirt G. Bowman (1874–1949, a businessman and a state and national politician.
