= Bowmans, Kent =

Coordinates: 51.43°N 00.18°E

Bowmans
- Location within Kent
- OS grid reference: TQ5273
- Shire county: Kent
- Region: South East
- Country: England
- Sovereign state: United Kingdom
- Police: Kent
- Fire: Kent
- Ambulance: South East Coast

Bowmans is a part of the town of Dartford in Kent, England. It is located to the south-west of the town centre.
