= Boundary, Derbyshire =

Hamlet in Derbyshire, England

Coordinates: 52.77°N 1.49°W

Boundary
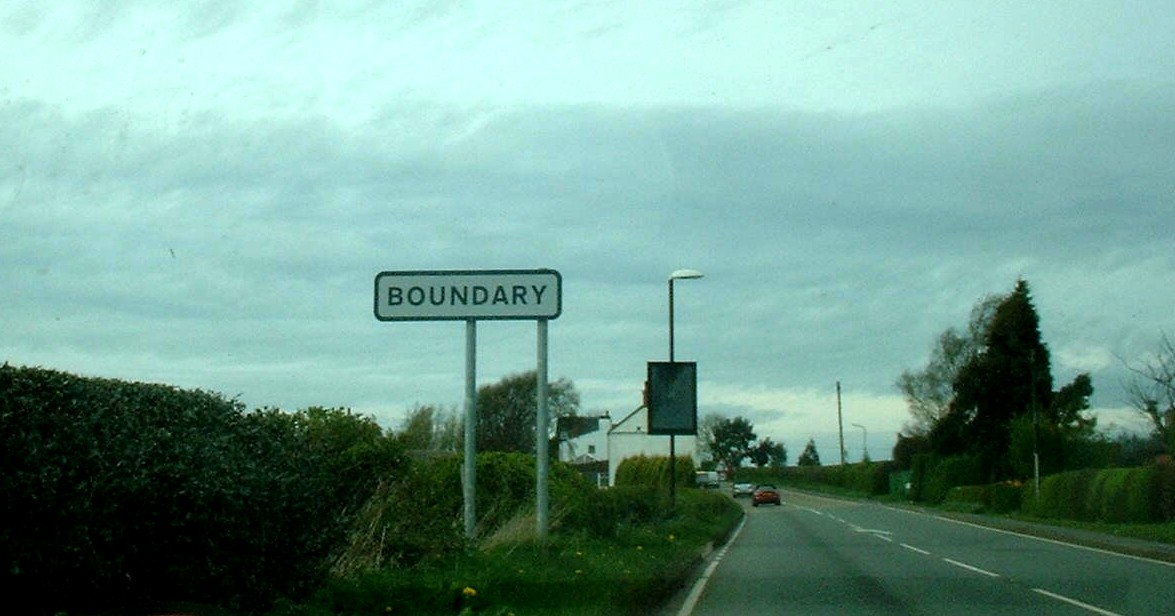
- The "Boundary" sign

- Location within Derbyshire
- OS grid reference: SK3419
- Civil parish: Smisby
- District: South Derbyshire
- Shire county: Derbyshire
- Region: East Midlands
- Country: England
- Sovereign state: United Kingdom
- Post town: ASHBY-DE-LA-ZOUCH
- Postcode district: LE65
- Police: Derbyshire
- Fire: Derbyshire
- Ambulance: East Midlands
- UK Parliament: South Derbyshire

Boundary is a large hamlet and as The Boundary a former civil parish, in South Derbyshire situated between the towns of Swadlincote and Ashby-de-la-Zouch on the A511 route. It is west of the village of Smisby and forms part of the county border with Leicestershire, hence its name. Residences on the north side of the A511 lie in Derbyshire and those on the south side lie within Leicestershire. The hamlet now falls within the civil parishes of Smisby, Derbyshire and Ashby-de-la-Zouch, Leicestershire. In 1931 the parish had a population of 87.

== Early history ==
Boundary was formerly an extra-parochial track, from 1866 The Boundary was a civil parish in its own right until it was abolished on 1 April 1934 and merged with Smisby. The inhabitants attend the churches at Blackfordby, Leicestershire, and Smisby. The population in 1881 was 102, principally labourers and their families.

== Today ==
Boundary is a long extended village, with a Public House at each end. The earliest reference to the Greyhound Inn was in the 1857 trade directory when the landlady was Elizabeth Cooper. At the other end of the village towards Ashby was the Red Lion. It got its licence in 1870 and in September 1871 was bought by Brunt & Bucknall of Woodville, together with the 4 cottages adjoining, from Edward and Hannah Moore. The first landlord was John Thornley and he was still there in 1899. The Red Lion was finally demolished in the early 1960s by Frank Jones of Woodville, The Greyhound was also bought by Brunt & Bucknall, but the date of acquisition is not known. This establishment is still serving although it has recently been refurbished.

Nearby villages in include Blackfordby to the south, Hartshorne to the north and Woodville to the west.
