= Bovingdon Green, Buckinghamshire =

Hamlet in Buckinghamshire, England

Coordinates: 51.575°N 00.80°W

Bovingdon Green
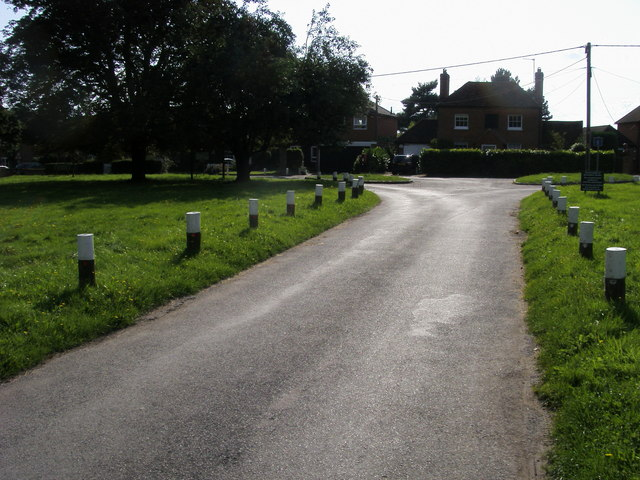
- The Green at Bovingdon Green, 2008

- Location within Buckinghamshire
- OS grid reference: SU8386
- Civil parish: Great Marlow
- Unitary authority: Buckinghamshire
- Ceremonial county: Buckinghamshire
- Region: South East
- Country: England
- Sovereign state: United Kingdom
- Post town: Marlow
- Postcode district: SL7
- Dialling code: 01628
- Police: Thames Valley
- Fire: Buckinghamshire
- Ambulance: South Central

Bovingdon Green is a hamlet in the civil parish of Great Marlow, just to the west of the town of Marlow in Buckinghamshire, England.
