= Pod (Afro Celt Sound System album) =

Remix album by Afro Celt Sound System
- Released: May 4, 2004
- Genres: World music, worldbeat, ethnic electronica
- Label: Real World Records

Afro Celt Sound System chronology
| 'Seed' (2003) | Pod (2004) | 'Volume 5: Anatomic' (2005) |

Professional ratings
Review scores
| Source | Rating |
|---|---|
| Allmusic | 3/5 stars |

Pod, released May 4, 2004 by Real World Records, is a remix album by Afro Celt Sound System of their first three albums, Volume 1: Sound Magic, Volume 2: Release, and Volume 3: Further in Time, done by members of the band and new artists as well, including some songs previously unavailable. It is also accompanied by a DVD of some music videos and some clips of their live tour.

== Track listing ==
1. "Rise Above" (remix by Simon Emmerson, James McNally and Simon ‘Mass’ Massey) – 6:17
2. "Johnny at Sea" (mix by Martin Russell and Mass) – 4:48
3. "Persistence of Memory" (remix by Rae & Christian) – 5:14
4. "Further in Time" (remix by Mass) – 7:45
5. "Full Moon Low Tide" (remix by DJ Toshio) – 4:34
6. "Release" (remix by Rollo and Sister Bliss) – 4:58
7. "Release it" (Masters At Work segue) – 1:20
8. "Whirly 3" (remix by Emmerson, McNally and Mass) – 7:55
9. "Riding the Skies" (remix by Mass and Simon Emmerson) – 6:04
10. "Éireann" (remix by Mass) – 6:17
11. "Release" (remix by BiPolar) – 5:30
12. "When You're Falling" (remix by Wren and Morley) – 4:37
13. "Lagan" (remix by Emmerson, McNally and Mass) – 4:36

=== Bonus DVD ===
1. "Persistence of Memory" (music video)
2. "When You're Falling" (music video)
3. Highlights from WOMAD USA 2001
4. "North" (5.1 surround sound and stereo mix music video)
