= Volume 3: Further in Time =

Studio album by Afro Celt Sound System
- Released: 19 June 2001
- Studios: Redchurch Recordings, London; Sonic Innovation, London; Real World Studios, Box; Strongroom, London
- Genres: Worldbeat; Celtic fusion; ethnic electronica
- Label: Real World
- Producers: Simon Emmerson; Martin Russell; Simon 'Mass' Massey; James McNally; Stephen Hague

Afro Celt Sound System chronology
Volume 2: Release (1999)	Volume 3: Further in Time (2001)	Seed (2003)

Singles from Volume 3: Further in Time
- 1. "When You're Falling" Released: 2001

Professional ratings
Review scores
Source	Rating
AllMusic	3/5 stars
Los Angeles Times	3/4 stars

Volume 3: Further in Time is the third studio album from Afro Celt Sound System, released on 19 June 2001 through Real World.

== Background ==
The album features N'Faly Kouyate in a more prominent role as a main contributor, a deliberate choice, as James McNally explained: "We felt the last album's African element wasn't as strong as it could have been. N'Faly had become a new member, and that was his first album. This time, he's much closer to the way we work and brought much more to the table than we could have ever imagined."

== Release ==
A video clip for the official single "When You're Falling" with an appearance of Peter Gabriel was directed by Adam Berg and released in July 2001. The single contains a dance-oriented remix by Adam Wren of Leftfield and Dom Morley. After the single had received worldwide attention, the song "Life Begin Again" was made available as promotional single in 2002.

Real World issued a limited-edition version of the album with an additional CD that contains a remix of the song "Eireann" from the predecessor album and a live version of the track "Mandrake". This edition was sold exclusively through retailer Borders. Afro Celt Sound System made the whole album available for streaming on their website.

== Critical reception ==
The album was nominated for Best Global Music Album at the 44th Annual Grammy Awards in 2002.

== Track listing ==
All tracks are written by Simon Emmerson, James McNally, Iarla Ó Lionáird and Martin Russell, except where noted.

No.	Title	Length
1.	"North" (Written by Emmerson, McNally, Ó Lionáird, Russell, Manu Dibango)	6:48
2.	"North 2"	2:59
3.	"When You're Falling" (Lyrics by Ó Lionáird, Emmerson.)	5:14
4.	"Colossus"	6:44
5.	"Lagan"	4:05
6.	"Shadowman" (Written by Emmerson, McNally, Ó Lionáird, Russell, N'Faly Kouyate)	6:36
7.	"Life Begin Again" (Music by Emmerson, McNally, Ó Lionáird, Russell, Mass. Lyrics by Ó Lionáird)	6:19
8.	"Further in Time" (Written by Emmerson, McNally, Ó Lionáird, Russell, Kouyate)	6:32
9.	"Go On Through" (Written by Emmerson, McNally, Ó Lionáird, Russell, Heather Nova)	8:03
10.	"Persistence of Memory" (Music by Emmerson, McNally, Ó Lionáird, Russell, Mass. Lyrics by Ó Lionáird)	4:29
11.	"The Silken Whip" (Written by Emmerson, McNally, Ó Lionáird, Russell, Mass)	7:17
12.	"Onwards" (Written by Emmerson, McNally, Ó Lionáird, Russell, Kouyate)	5:25

== Personnel ==
=== Afro Celt Sound System ===
- Simon Emmerson – guitars, bouzouki, mandolin, drum programming
- James McNally – high and low whistles, accordion, harmonium, piano, keyboards, bodhran, drum & keyboard programming
- Iarla Ó Lionáird – vocals
- Martin Russell – keyboards, programming, "front of house" live sound
- N'Faly Kouyate – vocals, kora, balafon (3–12)
- Johnny Kalsi – dhol drums, tabla, "Kalsi kit" (1–11)
- Emer Mayock – uilleann pipes (1, 2, 4, 8, 11), flute (11)
- Demba "Shadowman" Barry – vocals (6), dancing
- Moussa Sissokho – talking drum, djembe
- Simon "Mass" Massey – drum and keyboard programming (1–11)

=== Additional musicians ===
- Nawazish Ali Khan – violin (1, 6, 7)
- Nigel Eaton – hurdy-gurdy (1, 7)
- John Fortis – bass (3, 10)
- Peter Gabriel – vocals, keyboards (3)
- Sunil Kalyan – tabla (5, 9, 11)
- Pina Kollars – vocals (9)
- Pete Lockett – percussion (1, 2, 4, 5, 7–9, 11)
- Mairéad Ní Mhaonaigh – fiddle (4)
- Julie Murphy – vocals (7)
- Myrdhin – Celtic harp (8, 11, 12)
- Liam O'Flynn – uilleann pipes (9)
- Robert Plant – vocals (7)
- Hossam Ramzy – percussion (1–11)
- Screaming Orphans – vocals (3, 6, 8, 9, 12)
- Ciarán Tourish – fiddle (4)
- Rosie Wetters – solo cello (7)
- Wired Strings – strings (5, 9)

== Charts ==
Chart (2001)	Peak position
Irish Albums (IRMA)	33
Italian Albums (FIMI)	48
UK Albums (Official Charts)	77
US Billboard 200	176
US World Albums (Billboard)	1
