= Volume 1: Sound Magic =

Studio album by Afro Celt Sound System
- Released: 24 September 1996
- Recorded: 1995, February 1996
- Studios: Sonic Innovation, London; Real World Studios, Box
- Genres: World; worldbeat; ethnic electronica; Afrobeat; Celtic fusion
- Length: 65:53
- Label: Real World
- Producers: Ron Aslan; Martin Russell; Simon Emmerson; Jo Bruce

Afro Celt Sound System chronology
| Volume 1: Sound Magic (1996) | Volume 2: Release (1999) |

Singles from Volume 1: Sound Magic
- 1. "Whirl-Y-Reel" Released: 1997

Professional ratings
Review scores
| Source | Rating |
|---|---|
| AllMusic | 4/5 stars |
| MusicHound World | 4.5/5 stars |

Volume 1: Sound Magic is the first album by Afro Celt Sound System, released on 24 September 1996 through Real World Records.

== Track listing ==
Volume 1: Sound Magic track listing
| No. | Title | Writer(s) | Length |
|---|---|---|---|
| 1. | "Saor (Free) / News from Nowhere": a. "Saor (Free)"; b. "News from Nowhere" | Browne, Bruce: a. Browne; b. Bruce | 8:21 |
| 2. | "Whirl-y-Reel 1 (Beard and Sandals Mix)" | Emmerson, McNally | 7:21 |
| 3. | "Inion (Daughter)" | Bruce, Ó Lionáird | 4:15 |
| 4. | "Sure-As-Not / Sure-As-Knot (Jungle Segue)": a. "Sure-As-Not"; b. "Sure-As-Knot (Jungle Segue)" | Emmerson, Russell, Cissokho, Myrdhin: a. Emmerson, Russell, Cissokho, Myrdhin; b. Emmerson | 9:58 |
| 5. | "Nil Cead Againn Dul Abhaile (We Cannot Go Home)" | Aslan, Jules Brookes, Ogada, Ó Lionáird, Cissokho | 7:20 |
| 6. | "Dark Moon, High Tide" (including "Farewell to Eireann") | Spillane, Emmerson, Russell | 4:12 |
| 7. | "Whirl-y-Reel 2 (Folk Police Mix)" | Emmerson, Spillane | 5:28 |
| 8. | "House of the Ancestors" | Ogada, Bruce, Ó Lionáird | 8:01 |
| 9. | "Eistigh Liomsa Sealad (Listen to Me) / Saor Reprise": a. "Eistigh Liomsa Sealad (Listen to Me)"; b. "Saor Reprise" | traditional, arranged by Emmerson, Russell, Lavelle, Ó Lionáird, Myrdhin, Cissokho, Browne: a. traditional, arranged by Emmerson, Russell, Lavelle, Ó Lionáird, Myrdhin, Cissokho, Browne; b. Browne | 10:53 |

== Personnel ==
- Ronan Browne – flute, mandolin, harmonium, uilleann pipes
- Jo Bruce – keyboards, programming
- Kauwding Cissokho – kora
- Massamba Diop – talking drum
- Simon Emmerson – guitar, programming
- James McNally – accordion, bodhrán
- Iarla Ó Lionáird – vocals
- Ayub Ogada – vocals
- Martin Russell – keyboards, programming
- Davy Spillane – uilleann pipes

=== Additional personnel ===
- Malcolm Crosbie – guitar
- Simon Edwards – sintir
- Gary Finlayson – banjo
- John Fortis – bass, loops
- Angus R. Grant – fiddle
- Manu Katché – cymbals
- Caroline Lavelle – cello
- James MacKintosh – bongos
- Ian MacLeod – mandolin
- Levon Minassian – doudouk
- Myrdhin – harp
- Zil – vocal drone

== Chart positions ==
=== Album ===
| Chart (1996–1997) | Peak position |
|---|---|
| Australian Albums (ARIA) | 53 |
| New Zealand Albums (RMNZ) | 32 |
| UK Albums (Official Charts) | 59 |
| US World Albums (Billboard) | 15 |

=== Single ===
| Chart (1997) | Peak position |
|---|---|
| UK Singles (Official Charts) | 91 |
