= Nichola Bruce =

British avant-garde film director

Nichola Bruce (born 1953) is a British avant garde film director, cinematographer, screenwriter, and artist. Bruce uses an artistic approach to filmmaking alongside the use of digital technologies. Her use of digital film is accredited to the speed, creativity, and multi-layering that can be accessed through the technology. Daily Variety featured Bruce in their article "10 Digital Directors To Watch"(2000) and noted that Bruce takes her inspiration from the surrealists, Andrei Tarkovsky, and painting.

== Biography ==
Nichola Bruce was born in 1953 in Bromley, England. She was raised in Kent and London throughout her childhood. She began working with film, photography, art during her attendance at Hornsey College of Art and at Middlesex Polytechnic, beginning with super eight and 16mm.

== Career ==
Bruce founded Muscle Films with Michael Coulson a film and television company, producing offbeat programming for British TV and cinema and part of a new wave of graphic artists and punk filmmakers in London. Bruce and Coulson created paintings as the starting point for their films and later developed scripts from the images. Bruce also founded a design company Kruddart with Michael Coulson, producing anarchic, collage-based material for publishers Faber and Faber and New Scientist as well as working with many leading British film directors including Peter Greenaway, John Boorman, Neil Jordan

1984 film-maker Neil Jordan worked for several weeks in pre-production with artist filmmakers Nichola Bruce and Michael Coulson to create hundreds of detailed storyboard drawings for the feature The Company of Wolves. The film's visuals were of particular importance, as Jordan explains: The visual design was an integral part of the script. It was written and imagined with a heightened sense of reality in mind.

Bruce's 1985 short horror/drama Wings of Death (BFI) which she co-directed with Mike Coulson, featuring Dexter Fletcher and Kate Hardie, explored addiction. It was reviewed in Monthly Film Bulletin in 1986 by Mark Finch who described the film as "...certainly a curiosity--a modern morality tale, too long to be a commercial, too short to be a feature, but with a surer visual sense than many recent British films."

Bruce collaborated with Coulson on many projects, including The Human Face with Laurie Andersen and the music video The Blood of Eden for Peter Gabriel featuring vocals by Sinead O'Connor. Nichola Bruce and Michael Coulson were employed as visual co-ordinators by Peter Gabriel's Real World working on a number of projects including an innovative approach to the marketing of the Us album, commissioning contemporary artists such as Helen Chadwick, Rebecca Horn, Nils-Udo, Andy Goldsworthy, David Mach and Yayoi Kusama to create original artworks for each of the 11 songs on the multi-million-selling CD. Coulson and Bruce also documented the process on Hi-8 video and film.

Bruce was selected to create one of eight short films to be attached to the band Queen's album Made in Heaven.

Britain's Club X (Channel 4) was co-created by Nichola Bruce and Michael Coulson.

Her documentary feature The Monument on the artist Rachel Whiteread and the difficulties she faced to create the Holocaust memorial in Vienna provided an insight into the challenges that face artists making public works.

Bruce's first feature film I Could Read the Sky (2000) featuring Dermot Healy, Maria Doyle-Kennedy, Brendan Coyle and Stephen Rea was inspired by the photographic novel by writer Timothy O'Grady and photographer Steve Pyke. It focuses on the losses and memories of an old Irishman who spent most of his life working in England. The film has been described as "innovative, melancholic, and deeply moving film is a small gem, as much informed by literature as it is by cinema." In Jill Nelmes and Jule Selbo's book Women Screenwriters: An International Guide (2015) it is explained that "Because the film is an adaptation of a photographic novel, rather than a filmed version of its original source, Bruce creates the events in layers of images that tell the story." The music for the film was composed by Irish sean nós singer and member of Afro Celt Sound System, Iarla Ó Lionáird. Sinéad O'Connor, Noel Hill and Liam O'Maonlai also contributed to the soundtrack which was released by Real World Records.

Bruce was awarded a NESTA Fellowship in 2003 to study perception and was mentored by Richard Gregory (CBE) resulting in Strangeness of Seeing a body of work including a series of 26 films developed over a period of four years in collaboration with film maker Rebecca E Marshall.

Bruce's 2010 film about the Apollo Moon landings, Moonbug, won the Special Jury Remi Award for Theatrical Feature Documentary at the 2011 Houston International Film Festival. Moonbug is both a photographic road trip and an exploration of how photographs become signpost for history as it documents photographer Steve Pyke as he sets out on a journey across America in his search to meet and photograph the Apollo space pioneers. The pair also collaborated on a touring exhibition of Steve Pyke's Apollo portraits and space artefacts alongside a 3 Channel Triptych of the Moonbug film called Man On The Moon. Musician Matt Johnson produced the soundtrack for Moonbug having previously worked with Bruce on her documentary One Man Show: Dramatic Art of Steven Berkoff in (1995).

Her award-winning feature documentary Axis of Light (2011) co-directed and produced with Pia Getty is a poignant and absorbing observation of the influences of conflict seen through the work of eight leading artists – Etel Adnan, Jananne Al–Ani, Ayman Baalbaki, Mona Hatoum, Rachid Koraïchi, Youssef Nabil, Shirin Neshat, Mona Saudi.

== Filmography ==
=== Feature films ===
- I Could Read the Sky (2000)
- Moonbug (2010)
- Axis of Light (2011)

=== Television and short films ===
- Breath of Air (1986)
- Boolean Procedure (1987)
- Clip (1988)
- Wings of Death (1985)
- The Human Face (1991)
- Hang On A Second (1994)
- ‘O’ Made In Heaven; The Dramatic Art of Steven Berkoff (Documentary) (1995)
- The Loved (1996)
- The Monument (Documentary) (1997)
- Acts of Memory I;Laugh (2001)
- Acts of Memory 0.5 (2002)
- Peter Gabriel: Play (2004)
- Strangeness of Seeing (with Rebecca E Marshall, series of 26 films) (2002–2008)
- Dreams Dreams Dreams (2010)
- Lifetime (2010)

== Awards and nominations ==
Award	Film	Category	Organization	Role
Best Editing	Axis of Light	Feature Documentary	UNAFF/Stanford Award 2012 United Nations Association Film Festival	Co-director and writer
Platinum Remi Award	Axis of Light	Feature Documentary	Houston International Film Festival 2012	Co-director and writer
Special Jury Remi Award	Moonbug	Feature Documentary	44th Houston International Film Festival 2011	Producer, director, writer, and cinematographer
Ten Digital Directors to Watch Award	I Could Read The Sky	Feature Drama	Variety Magazine, Los Angeles 2000	Director and writer
Best Writing	Wings of Death	Drama Short	Kraków Film Festival, Poland 1986	Co-director and co-writer
