= When You're Falling =

Single by Afro Celt Sound System featuring Peter Gabriel

from the album Volume 3: Further in Time
- Released: 30 July 2001
- Genre: World
- Length: 5:14 (album version); 3:44 (single version)
- Label: Real World
- Songwriters: Simon Emmerson; James McNally; Iarla O'Lionaird; Martin Russell
- Producer: Simon Emmerson

Afro Celt Sound System singles chronology
"Release" (2000)	"When You're Falling" (2001)

Peter Gabriel singles chronology
"While the Earth Sleeps" (1996)	"When You're Falling" (2001)	"The Barry Williams Show" (2002)

"When You're Falling" is a song by world music group Afro Celt Sound System, released as the first single from the band's third studio album Volume 3: Further in Time. The song features vocals from Peter Gabriel, Iarla Ó Lionáird, and members of Screaming Orphans.

== Background ==
Peter Gabriel provided keyboards and vocals to "When You're Falling" and discussed his involvement on the track in a 2001 interview.

The song was very loose and relaxed. There were a couple of places where we were just fooling around, like at the end, trying to build up different harmonies in an a cappella style, and in the middle section, which was improvised. It was a lot of fun to sing and play keyboards on, so what I thought might be hard work turned out to be a real pleasure.

— Peter Gabriel

== Release ==
"When You're Falling" was serviced to US adult album alternative radio stations in June 2001 and debuted on the Billboard Adult Alternative Airplay chart at No. 8 for the week dated 9 June 2001, making it the highest debut on the chart that week. Billboard announced that "When You're Falling" would be serviced to hot adult contemporary radio stations on 9 July 2001 and issued to alternative stations around the same time.

When You're Falling" was released as a physical single in July 2001. Adam Wren of Leftfield created a remix of the track, which was included on the commercial single. Music Week called the song "a curiously weak choice for a single" that more closely resembled Gabriel's music than the work of Afro Celt Sound System. They also felt that the song would have little appeal outside of their most dedicated fans.

Adam Berg directed the song's music video, which included appearances from Gabriel in certain scenes. The music video was added to VH1 during the week of 22 July 2001. It was also made available on the Real World Records website.

Following the September 11 attacks in the United States, Slate reported that Clear Channel Communications distributed a memorandum to various program directors containing a list of over 150 songs that they believed contained "questionable lyrics". One of the songs included on the list was "When You're Falling". The vice president of programming at Clear Channel had assembled the list for radio programmers and advised them to exercise restraint when selecting songs to broadcast.

== Track listing ==
CD single (UK)

1. "When You're Falling" (Short radio edit) – 3:44
2. "When You're Falling" (Wren & Morley Mix) – 4:35
3. "When You're Falling" (Album version) – 5:16
4. "When You're Falling" (video)

Promo CD single (UK)

1. "When You're Falling" (Short radio edit) – 3:40
2. "When You're Falling" (Long radio edit) – 4:14

Promo CD single (US)

1. "When You're Falling" (Short radio edit) – 3:40
2. "When You're Falling" (Long radio edit) – 4:14
3. "When You're Falling" (Album version) – 5:14
4. Call-out hook

== Charts ==
Chart performance for "When You're Falling"
Chart (2001)	Peak position
Netherlands (Single Top 100)	86
UK Singles Chart	139
US Adult Alternative Airplay (Billboard)	1
US Adult Pop Airplay (Billboard)	27
