= Volume 2: Release =

Studio album by Afro Celt Sound System
- Released: 25 January 1999
- Studios: Sonic Innovation, London
- Genres: Worldbeat; Celtic fusion; ethnic electronica
- Length: 64:15
- Label: Real World
- Producers: Simon Emmerson; Martin Russell

Afro Celt Sound System chronology
Volume 1: Sound Magic (1996)	Volume 2: Release (1999)	Volume 3: Further in Time (2001)

Singles from Volume 2: Release
- 1. "Release" Released: 2000

Volume 2: Release is Afro Celt Sound System's second album, released on 25 January 1999 by Real World Records.

== Release ==
A shorter edit of the title song "Release" was released in 1999 on the soundtrack for the American horror film Stigmata.

In 2000, Real World issued a single of the title track containing a remix of Rollo Armstrong and two remixes of Masters at Work. By 2001, the album had sold 105,000 copies in the United States according to Nielsen Soundscan.

== Critical reception ==
Professional ratings
Review scores
Source	Rating
AllMusic	3/5 stars
MusicHound World	4.5/5 stars

The album was nominated for Best Global Music Album at the 42nd Annual Grammy Awards in 2000.

== Track listing ==
All tracks are written by Simon Emmerson, James McNally, Iarla Ó Lionáird and Martin Russell, except where noted.

No.	Title	Length
1.	"Release" (Written by Emmerson, McNally, Ó Lionáird, Russell and Sinéad O'Connor)	7:39
2.	"Lovers of Light"	4:03
3.	"Éireann" (Written by Emmerson, McNally, Ó Lionáird, Russell and N'Faly Kouyate)	5:12
4.	"Urban Aire" (Written by Ronan Browne, Emmerson, McNally, Ó Lionáird and Russell)	2:07
5.	"Big Cat" (Written by Emmerson, McNally, Ó Lionáird, Russell and Ashley Maher)	7:47
6.	"Even in My Dreams" (Written by Emmerson, McNally, Ó Lionáird, Russell and Ron Aslan)	7:07
7.	"Amber" (Written by Emmerson, McNally, Ó Lionáird, Russell and Kouyate)	5:27
8.	"Hypnotica"	7:18
9.	"Riding the Waves" (Written by Emmerson, McNally, Ó Lionáird, Russell and Browne)	6:36
10.	"I Think of..."	4:33
11.	"Release It (instrumental)"	6:26

== Personnel ==
=== Afro Celt Sound System ===
- Simon Emmerson – guitar, programming, keyboard, production
- James McNally – keyboard, whistle, low whistle, bodhran, accordion, additional production
- Iarla Ó Lionáird – vocals, Irish lyrics and translations
- Martin Russell – keyboard, programming, engineering, production, recording, mix engineering (2, 4, 5, 8, 9)
- N'Faly Kouyate – vocals, kora, balafon, French and African lyrics
- Myrdhin – celtic harp
- Moussa Sissokho – talking drum, djembe

=== Additional musicians ===
- Ron Aslan – programming beats, additional production (2, 6)
- Ronan Browne – uilleann pipes (2, 3, 4, 9)
- Michael McGoldrick – uilleann pipes (1, 2, 5, 10, 11), flute (5)
- Sinéad O'Connor – vocals (1)
- Ashley Maher – vocals (8)
- Johnny Kalsi – dhol drums, tablas
- Nigel Eaton – hurdy gurdy (1, 11)
- Youth – bass (8)

=== Technical personnel ===
- Tristan Manco – graphic design
- Jamie Reid – paintings
- Ted Emmerson – video grab photos
- Joe Dobson – video grab photos
- David Bottrill – mix engineering (1, 3, 5–8, 10, 11)
- Marco Migliari – assistant engineering
- Claire Lewis – assistant engineering
- Ian Cooper – mastering

== Chart positions ==
=== Album ===
Chart (1999)	Peak position
Australian Albums (ARIA)	93
French Albums (SNEP)	63
New Zealand Albums (RMNZ)	42
UK Albums (Official Charts)	38
US World Albums (Billboard)	6

=== Single ===
Chart (2000)	Peak position
UK Singles (Official Charts)	71

== Sales figures ==
According to Nielsen SoundScan Volume 2: Release has sold 105,000 units in the United States.
