= Songs for the Poor Man =

Studio album by Remmy Ongala & Orchestre Super Matimila
- Released: 30 October 1989
- Recorded: May 1989
- Studio: Real World Studios, Wiltshire
- Genre: Soukous; Tanzanian
- Length: 69:24
- Label: Real World Records
- Producer: Remmy Ongala; David Bottrill; Basil Anderson

Remmy Ongala & Orchestre Super Matimila chronology
Nalilia Mwana (1988)	Songs for the Poor Man (1989)	Mambo (1992)

Songs for the Poor Man is the first studio album and second album overall by Tanzanian soukous musician Remmy Ongala and his band Orchestre Super Matimila, released in 1989 on Real World Records. The album follows Ongala's acclaimed appearances at the WOMAD Tour and WOMAD'S release of Naillia Mwana, a compilation of early music by Ongala, two events which gave Ongala international recognition. Songs for the Poor Man was recorded at the WOMAD-affiliated Real World Studios in Wiltshire over three days in May 1989 with production, engineering and mixing help from David Bottrill.

The album exemplifies Ongala and the band's move towards a soukous-style sound, while being more sparse and broadened than conventional soukous and adding elements of East African funk, Afro-Latin and Caribbean music, as well as making prominent usage of conga parts to double its guitar lines. Ongala's lyrics deal with social issues such as urban poverty in Tanzania and racism. Upon release, Songs for the Poor Man won critical acclaim from critics, praising the album's conviction and passion. Robert Christgau named it the 8th greatest album of 1989, and Tom Moon included it in the book 1,000 Recordings to Hear Before You Die.

== Background and recording ==
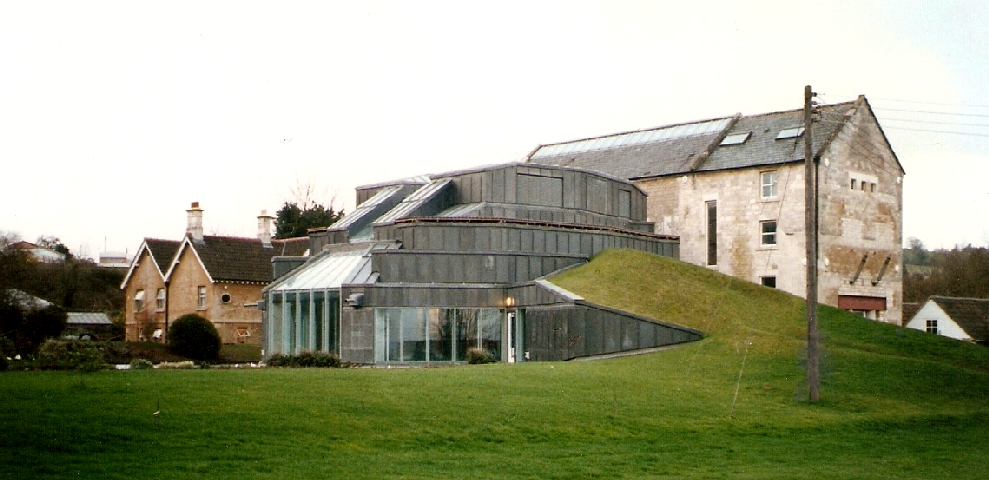
Real World Studios in 1990.

Although 'Ubongo beat' musician Remmy Ongala, alongside his backing band Orchestre Super Matimila, started to become one of the most famous musicians in Tanzania in the 1980s, his increasing fame failed to parallel with increasing fortune due to a lack of adequate copyright law protection and scam record labels in countries such as Kenya who pressed more copies of a recording by Ongala than they agreed to, keeping the royalties from the extra copies themselves.

Ongala did, however, give a tape of his music to an English friend who was visiting Ongala's native Dar es Salaam and returning to London, who later passed the cassette on, ultimately finding itself at the hands of Peter Gabriel's world music organisation WOMAD. Pleased with his music, WOMAD released a critically acclaimed compilation of his early 1980s lo-fi recordings entitled Nalilia Mwana, which established many of his musical themes. WOMAD also invited Ongala and Orchestre Super Matimila to play on the 1988 edition of its annual WOMAD Tour, where audiences greeted his music with enthusiasm.

Although highly popular in East Africa, his new WOMAD performances and album helped him reach European and American audiences. While the band's appearances were acclaimed, the ensemble had to shrink in size when playing live for touring practicality, and were also moving towards a soukous sound, "the brasher, faster modern variant of rumba Congolaise then popular." WOMAD and Gabriel contacted Ongala and Orchestre Super Matimila, and Ongala agreed to record a new album, Songs for the Poor Man, for Gabriel and WOMAD's new label Real World Records. By the time of the recording, Orchestre Super Matimila "had become a regular fixture at WOMAD festivals." The album was recorded and mixed at Gabriel's Real World Studios in Box, Wiltshire, England, over three days in 1989 during "Recording Week." The album was produced by Ongala with Basil Anderson and David Bottrill, who engineered, mixed and edited the album. Christopher Johns acted as assistant engineer.

== Composition ==
=== Music ===
"Rather than relentless Afrodance upmanship, he cultivates a variety that suits Tanzania's folk-friendly cultural policy."

—Robert Christgau

At the root of Songs for the Poor Man is the "steady, melodic drive" of the Zaïrean-style of soukous, the "shimmery Afro-pop dance style," and each song on the album is based on the genre's defining interlaced guitar arpeggios. Unlike conventional soukous however, which is brisk and uptight, Songs for the Poor Man broadens soukousbbackbeats while slowing them down, giving them "a touch of professional swagger and a touch of East African funk." According to Bob Tarte of AllMusic, the album's Tanzanian take on soukous "is as restrained as the Zairian form is hedonistic." The music is aided by the inclusion of a "fluid East African guitar style and infectious Tanzanian rhythms."

Music critic Robert Christgau felt the "unbrassy band", consisting of three percussionists, three guitarists, a saxophonist and a bassist, strives in a unique way unlike that of Afro-Parisian music. The up-front conga parts, played by Saidi Salum Jumaine, double the guitar lines and, according to Christgau, "convey an esteem for both tribal difference and East African ways that complements the caring precision of Ongala's singing and the undulating buoyancy of his groove." The music on the album is broad and spacious, and contains elements of Caribbean and Latin music. Ongala's voice on the album has been described as rich, soulful, and weathered. "Kipenda Roho" features a "hard drive" while "Mariamu Wangu", Ongala's "own all-time favourite," is based on the popular "mdundiko ngoma," which originates from Dar es Salaam.

=== Lyrics ===
Unlike previous music by Ongala, the album contains songs in both English and Swahili, as opposed to just Swahili. Ongala decided to write and sing some songs in English so that he could reach a wider audience. The album tackles social themes, and features both elegies and sorrowful laments. Author Tom Moon compared the songs to lullabies and felt that "Ongala sounds like one who knows what it's like to be down, and knows, also, that he will not give up." The "steadfastness of women" is one subject on the album, as is reckoning with death, which is dealt with on "Kifo." "Karola" warns listeners to "be careful in a world where you believe there is goodness," while "Kipenda Roho" is an anti-racist song. Although poverty has been described as the album's theme, racism is considered its second most prevalent subject.

The situation regarding development policy in Tanzania in the late 1980s was poor, and the country had entered a prolonged period economic contraction until 1994. In this period, Ongala styled himself as the "voice of the poor man," and this is evident in the lyrics and title of Songs for the Poor Man. Problems affecting the urban poor in particular are addressed specifically on songs such as "Mnyonge Hana Haki" ('The Poor Have No Rights') and a remake of "Sauti Ya Mnyonge" ('Voice of the Poor Man'); in the latter song, Ongala "assumed the character of a poor urban migrant to highlight the daily problems of poverty," with lyrics such as "I sleep on a goat skin/On the floor with bugs and fleas/With no electricity – just a paraffin lamp." One writer elaborated on the lyrics of the song:

"Both the material contrast between rich and poor and the social alienation of the underprivileged are brought to the listener's attention. The sense of social as well as economic inequality comes across as wealth is associated with beauty and contrasted with the humiliation of being poor. The reference to the Kilimanjaro Hotel, one of the most prestigious hotels in the city at the time, locates this character in Dar es Salaam, and the opening phrase ‘Mother – where are you?’ suggests that this ‘Remmy’ is separated from his family; possibly a semi-fictional protagonist but potentially Remmy Ongala himself, given the economic pressures acting on musicians at this time and Remmy's emigration from his homeland."

"Mnyonge Hana Haki" developed the themes of urban poverty, "in which the association of Dar es Salaam with the pressures of liberalization, competition and inequality is made more explicit;" Ongala attacked the belief that town life is "easier, better or wealthier than rural life." One writer noted: "Dar es Salaam is not the 'House of Peace' but of social insecurities such as being dependent upon a landlord. A key point in both ‘Sauti ya Mnyonge’ and ‘Mnyonge Hana Haki’ is that without the extended support network of a village community, those without wealth have no authority to speak for their needs."

== Release and reception ==
Professional ratings
Review scores
Source	Rating
AllMusic	3/5 stars
Robert Christgau	A
Folk Roots	(favourable)
NME	7/10

Songs for the Poor Man was released on 30 October 1989 by Real World Records, and was the sixth release on the label. The album cover features a composite image, created by Rani Charrington, depicting Ongola's face superimposed over a satellite image taken and licensed by the Science Photo Library. Jones/Mouat of Assorted Images are credited for artwork design, Francis Drake for photography and Peter Gabriel for liner notes.

The album was released to critical acclaim. Bob Tarte of AllMusic, while rating the album three stars out of five, was praiseful, saying "Ongala's songs on social themes are delivered with winning conviction." Writing in his Consumer's Guide for The Village Voice, music critic Robert Christgau rated the album a grade of "A." He said: "Isolated culturally and economically by socialist underdevelopment, Tanzanian pop nurtures national treasures more diligently than neighboring Zairean and Kenyan styles," praising the album's musical palette, conga parts, "esteem for both tribal difference and East African ways," and concluding: "Sweet. Strong. Maybe even self-sufficient." Christgau named it the eighth best album of 1989 in his annual list of his favourite albums, curated for the annual Pazz & Jop poll.

In 2004, Songlines ranked the album at number 34 in their list of "50 Essential African Albums." The album features in Tom Moon's 2008 book 1,000 Recordings to Hear Before You Die. Describing the album as "passionately sung odes to heal the soul," Moon said the songs "speak, with great empathy, about suffering and poverty, trials [Ongala] knew from personal experience," and felt "the rhythm is entrancing without being overpowering;" he described "Kifo" and "Pamella" as highlights. In his 1992 book Breakout: Profiles in African Rhythm, writer Gary Stewart noted the album's messages were "strong and passionate" and said the record was "music for the brain and for the feet and hips as well." He concluded that "if acceptance [of racial equality] is not yet total, at least this dreadlocked, consciousness-rating African is beginning to get a hearing." In the Rough Guides book World Music: Africa, Europe and the Middle East, the album was described as Ongala's "best international release."

== Aftermath ==
While Songs for the Poor Man helped expand Ongala's international audience, he caused controversy in Tanzania in 1990 with the release of the song "Mambo Kwa Socks" ('Things with Socks'), which called for young men to wear condoms to prevent catching AIDS (the song was released at the height of the AIDS pandemic in Africa); the song was banned on Radio Tanzania Dar es Salaam, but "live shows and black market tapes have ensured that his message has spread." In 1992, Ongala and the Orchestre Super Matimila recorded a second album for Real World Records, Mambo, which similarly featured a mix of Swahili and English songs, while also trading in "the laid-back soukous" of Songs for the Poor Man for a rougher dance sound.

== Track listing ==
All songs written by Remmy Ongala except where noted

1. "Nasikitika" – 6:21
2. "Karola" – 5:46
3. "Kipenda Roho" – 6:38
4. "Sauti Ya Mnyonge" (Bati Osenga) – 8:34
5. "Kifo" – 9:15
6. "Usingizi" – 7:48
7. "Muziki Asili Yake Wapi" – 5:31
8. "Pamella" – 5:25
9. "Dole" – 6:56
10. "Mariam Wangu" – 7:07

== Personnel ==
=== Performers ===
- Saidi Salum Jumaine – congas
- Lawrence Chuki Limbanga – drums
- Freddy Sengula Mwlasha – guitar
- Hasani Ayas Ayas – guitar
- Muhidini Kisukari Haji – guitar
- Matimila – percussion
- Remmy Ongala – lead vocals, guitar, co-production, writer (all tracks except 4)
- Matu Dikundia Hassan – saxophone
- Keitko Kiniki – vocals

=== Others ===
- Bati Osenga – writer (track 4)
- Basil Anderson – producer
- Jones/Mouat @ Assorted Images – artwork (design)
- David Bottrill – co-producer, engineer, mixing, editing
- Christopher Johns – assistant engineer
- Peter Gabriel – liner notes
- Thos Brooman – liner notes
- Kevin Metcalfe – mastering
- Francis Drake – photography
- Rani Charrington/NOVA – photography (composite front cover)
- Science Photo Library – photography (satellite picture front cover)
