= Stelsi =

Ukrainian music group

Stelsi Стелсі
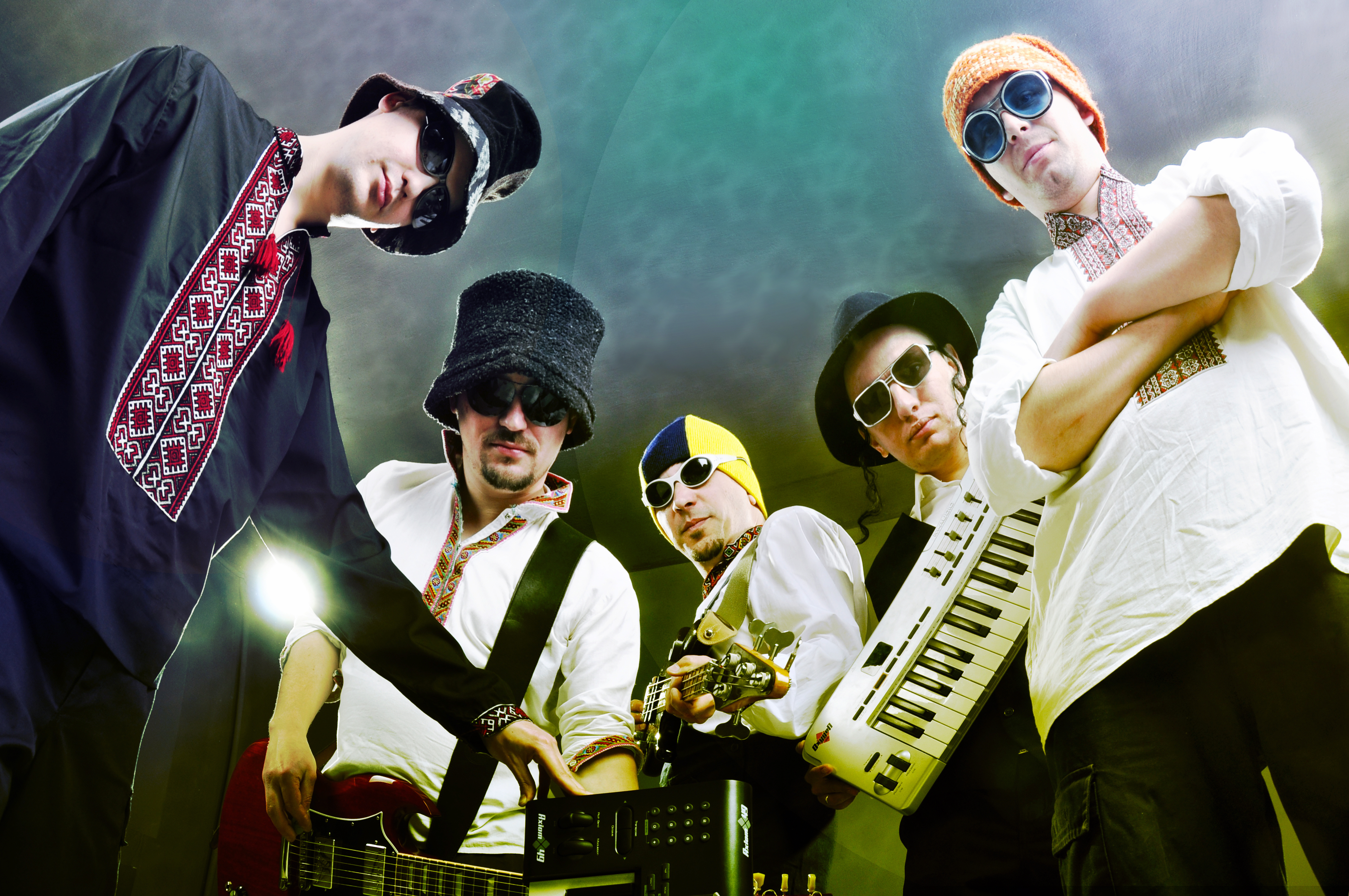

Background information
- Origin: Chernivtsy, Ukraine
- Genres: electro-folk, synthpop, electronica
- Years active: 1999–present
- Members: Alex Kukharsky; Serhiy Vereninov; Mykola Kobilyuk; Serhiy Palka
- Website: http://www.stelsi.com

Stelsi is a Ukrainian electro-folk/synthpop/electronic dance music group, founded in 1999 by Alex Kukharsky in Chernivtsi, Bukovina, Ukraine. The band is credited as one of the first electronic music acts in Ukraine, with a fusion of styles that quickly grew into mainstream popularity at the beginning of the 2000s. The band's sound evolved from big-beat, techno, house and other club-oriented genres (2000-2003); up to more live performance synthpop\alternative\rock music (2003-2005), eventually incorporating ethnic\folk elements. This resulted in a style fusion that was called "electro-folk" by critics and the press (2005–present). The band's music can be frequently heard in commercials, radio & TV shows, presentations, sports events and other media throughout Ukraine.

== Members ==
- Alex Kukharsky - vocals, lyrics, synth, keyboards, producer
- Aleksandr “Gunya” Vereninov - guitar, lyrics
- Mykola “Sniper” Kobyliuk - synth, keyboards, sampling, backing vocals, lyrics
- Serhiy Palka - Bass, backing vocals

== Discography ==
=== Albums ===
- Total Synth-ethics (Суцільна Синт-етика) (2001)
- Sunrise (Сонцесхід) (2002)
- Model (Модель) (EP) (2003)
- Aliens (2004)
- Tam... (Там...) (2005)
- Unlimited Unreliability Company (Товариство з безмежною безвідповідальністю) (2008)
