= Pina Kollars =

Austrian-born female folk rock singer

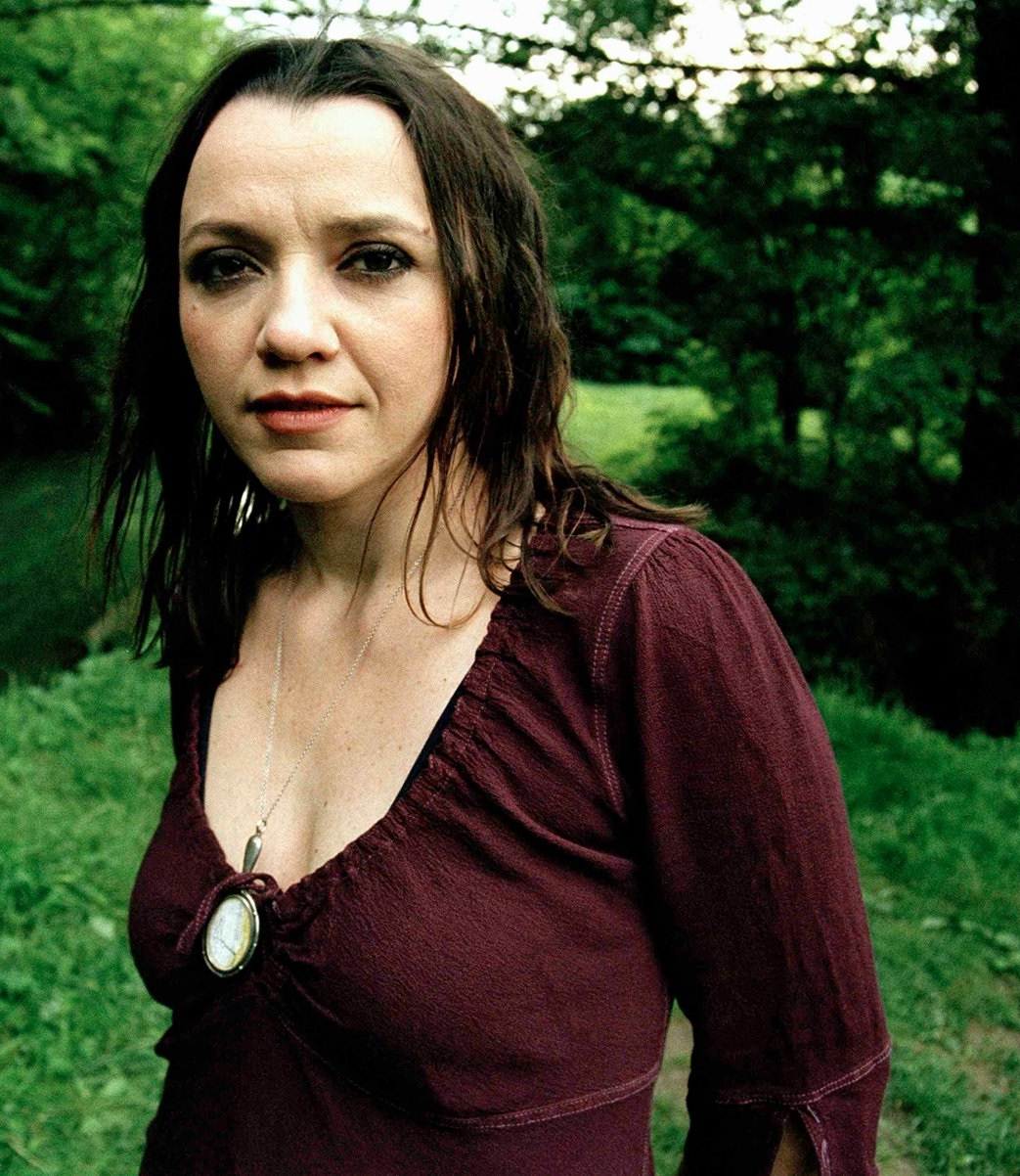
- Pina in September 2015

Background information
- Born: Pina Pertl; Vienna, Austria
- Genres: Folk rock; pop rock; alternative rock; indie rock
- Occupations: Singer; multi-instrumentalist; record engineer; record producer
- Instruments: Vocals; guitar; keyboards; percussion
- Years active: 2001–present
- Labels: Real World; EMI; Virgin; PRE

Pina Kollars is an Austrian-born female folk rock singer. She is usually only known as Pina.

== Early years ==
Pina Pertl was born in Vienna and raised by her grandparents. She began writing songs in her teens and studied classical guitar at the city's conservatorium. She began studies in medicine, but decided on a career in music instead. She found making a living from music in Austria was difficult and relocated to Cork, Ireland, in 1997.

== Music career ==
Pina's songwriting was inspired by the isolated countryside, and she formed her own band to play on the local music circuit. She played at the Glastonbury Festival in 2003 and began showcasing her talent in London. She was included on a British tour supporting Ani DiFranco and sang a duet with Afro Celt Sound System's Iarla Ó Lionáird on the Real World Records album, Volume 3: Further in Time, singing on "Go on Through".

Pina's recording on Further in Time was heard by Peter Gabriel and he released her first album, Quick Look, on his Real World Records label. Billboard called it an "extraordinary debut", praising her as a "gifted" instrumentalist and a writer of "compelling lyrics." AllMusic compared her to Stevie Nicks, praising her distinctive voice and awarding it 3/5. Les Inrockuptibles compared her to Nick Drake and Emmylou Harris, blending Celtic romanticism with central-European classicism. RootsWorld compared her to Melanie Safka, praising her voice but questioning whether the lyrics meant anything. Classic Rock found her a bit self-obsessed.

In 2005 Pina released her second album Guess You Got It.

== Personal life ==
When she moved to Ireland, Pina was married to Helmut Kollars (b. 1968, Graz), a writer and illustrator of children's books. The couple had a daughter, Luise Magdalena, but divorced before the recording of Pina's first album. Kollars went on to work as a freelance illustrator for publishing and advertising in Ireland, Belgium and the US, and eventually settled in Kassel.

Pina had a second daughter in 2006 and married musician Andy Hogg in 2009. In 2007 she completed studies to become a nutritional therapist and moved back to Vienna.

== Discography ==
- However, ...Plain (DADC Austria, 1995)
- Vocals on the song "Go on Through" from the Afro Celt Sound System album Volume 3: Further in Time (2001)
- Quick Look (Real World, 2002)
- Guess You Got It (Real World/EMI, 2005)
- The Work Room Sessions (Real World, 2005)
- Six Foot Snake [as Pina & 10 Stone 20] (2019)
