= Seed (Afro Celt Sound System album) =

Studio album by Afro Celt Sound System
- Released: March 25, 2003
- Genre: World music, worldbeat, ethnic electronica
- Label: Real World Records

Afro Celt Sound System chronology
'Volume 3: Further in Time' (2001)	Seed (2003)	'Pod' (2004)

Professional ratings
Review scores
Source	Rating
Allmusic	link
The Village Voice	C−

Seed is the fourth album by Afro Celt Sound System, released on March 25, 2003 by Real World Records.

For this album, the band had shortened their name to Afrocelts. They later regarded the name change as a mistake, and on subsequent albums reverted to their original name.

== Track listing ==
1. "Cyberia" – 7:41
2. "Seed" – 6:25
3. "Nevermore" – 4:45
4. "The Other Side" – 7:01
5. "Ayub's Song/As You Were" – 7:31
6. "Rise" – 3:06
7. "Rise Above It" – 10:11
8. "Deep Channel" – 6:48
9. "All Remains" – 7:30
10. "Green" (instrumental version of "Nevermore") – 5:57
