= Trance (Hassan Hakmoun album) =

Studio album by Hassan Hakmoun and Zahar
- Released: 1993
- Studio: Real World (Wiltshire)
- Genre: Gnawa music
- Length: 57:16
- Label: Real World
- Producer: Simon Emmerson

Hassan Hakmoun and Zahar chronology
Gift of the Gnawa (1992)	Trance (1993)	The Fire Within (1995)

Trance is an album by the Moroccan musician Hassan Hakmoun. It was released in 1993. He is credited with his band, Zahar. Hakmoun supported the album by playing "The Musical World of Islam" concert series, in 1993, as well as Woodstock '94.

== Production ==
Recorded at Peter Gabriel's Real World Studios, in Wiltshire, England, the album was produced by Simon Emmerson. Hakmoun played the sintir, an instrument similar to a three-stringed bass. He was backed on many tracks by Egyptian percussion.

== Critical reception ==
Professional ratings
Review scores
Source	Rating
AllMusic	4.5/5 stars
Calgary Herald	B+
The Encyclopedia of Popular Music	4/5 stars
MusicHound World: The Essential Album Guide	3.5/5 stars

The Chicago Reader wrote that Hakmoun "transplanted the mysteriously powerful trance-out grooves of Gnawa music into a vital, contemporary sound without watering down its primal spirit." The Guardian determined that "all but one of the songs are underpinned by muscular percussion, and veer from mesmeric Arabic chanting to bursts of jazz fusion, sax solos, frenzied guitar work, or—strangest of all—a Moroccan interpretation of Jamaican ragga."

The Calgary Herald stated that Hakmoun's "voice reaches deep and soars high while singing of human love, of the ways of Allah," writing that the music incorporates "rock and funk, percussive Afro-jazz grooves, buoyed by wild guitar riffs and sax solos." The Edmonton Journal deemed the album "innovative, vibrant Afro-beat." Rolling Stone concluded: "Black Moroccan Gnawa funk rock, Trance is a world fusion that works—even the obligatory hiphop mix is on the dime."

AllMusic wrote: "From the Hendrix-in-a-fez riff of 'Bania' to the fuzz-box nirvana of 'Challaban', Trance asserts psychedelic sovereignty over Moroccan sensibilities that hippie hash-heads once claimed as their own music base."

== Track listing ==
No.	Title	Length
1.	"Bania"	5:48
2.	"Only One God (Maaboud Allah)"	10:03
3.	"Soudan Minitara" (Bumbastic Mix)	8:04
4.	"Challaban"	8:18
5.	"Soutanbi" (recorded live at World in the Park (Bath) on 15 August 1992)	5:52
6.	"Soulalahoalih"	4:17
7.	"Alal Wahya Alal" (Trance Mix)	6:07
8.	"The Sun Is Gone"	4:56
9.	"Soudan Minitara"	3:51
