= Firin' in Fouta =

Studio album by Baaba Maal
- Released: October 24, 1994
- Length: 55:04
- Label: Mango
- Producer: Simon Emmerson

Baaba Maal chronology
Wango (1994)	Firin' in Fouta (1994)	Gorel (1995)

Firin' in Fouta is an album by the Senegalese singer Baaba Maal, released in 1994.

The album was nominated for a Grammy Award, in the "Best World Music Album" category. Maal supported the album with a North American tour.

== Production ==
The album was produced by Simon Emmerson. It was recorded in Podor and Dakar, in Senegal, and at London's Real World Studios.

Dónal Lunny and Simon Jeffes were among the musicians who contributed to Firin' in Fouta. Positive Black Soul appeared on "Swing Yela".

== Critical reception ==
Professional ratings
Review scores
Source	Rating
AllMusic	3/5 stars
Robert Christgau	(2-star Honorable Mention)
The Encyclopedia of Popular Music	3/5 stars
The Guardian	4/4 stars

The Guardian wrote that "Baaba Maal adds to the new experimental fusion of traditional styles and ultra-modern influences with his bravest and most startling album to date." The Independent determined that Maal's "plaintive Islamic ululations are brilliantly blended with arrangements that may borrow from hip-hop, salsa and ragga." The Baltimore Sun noted that "some songs are nearly worlds unto themselves, like the loping, hypnotic 'Sama Duniya', which mixes West African percussion, an East Indian drone, dancehall bass and funk clavinet into a near irresistible rhythmic stew."

The Gazette considered "African Woman" to be the album's best song, writing that it "begins with a hint of bouncy Colombian cumbia but quickly becomes a blazing Afro-Latin stew." The Globe and Mail concluded that "what stands out is Maal's exquisite ululating tenor, a voice so sweet and mournful, delicate and powerful that it seems to bridge the gap of language and culture all by its lonesome."

AllMusic wrote that "the keyboards and, more importantly, the drum loops give the songs a deep European club feel along with a strong push in the way of the vocals."

== Track listing ==
1. "Sidiki" – 4:53
2. "African Woman" – 6:05
3. "Swing Yela" – 4:24
4. "Mbaye" – 5:01
5. "Njilou" – 5:30
6. "Gorel" – 5:28
7. "Sama Duniya" – 5:19
8. "Salimoun" (Funky Kora) – 5:02
9. "Ba" – 7:14
10. "Tiedo" – 6:08
