= Hassan Hakmoun =

Moroccan musician (born 1963)

Hassan Hakmoun حسن حكمون
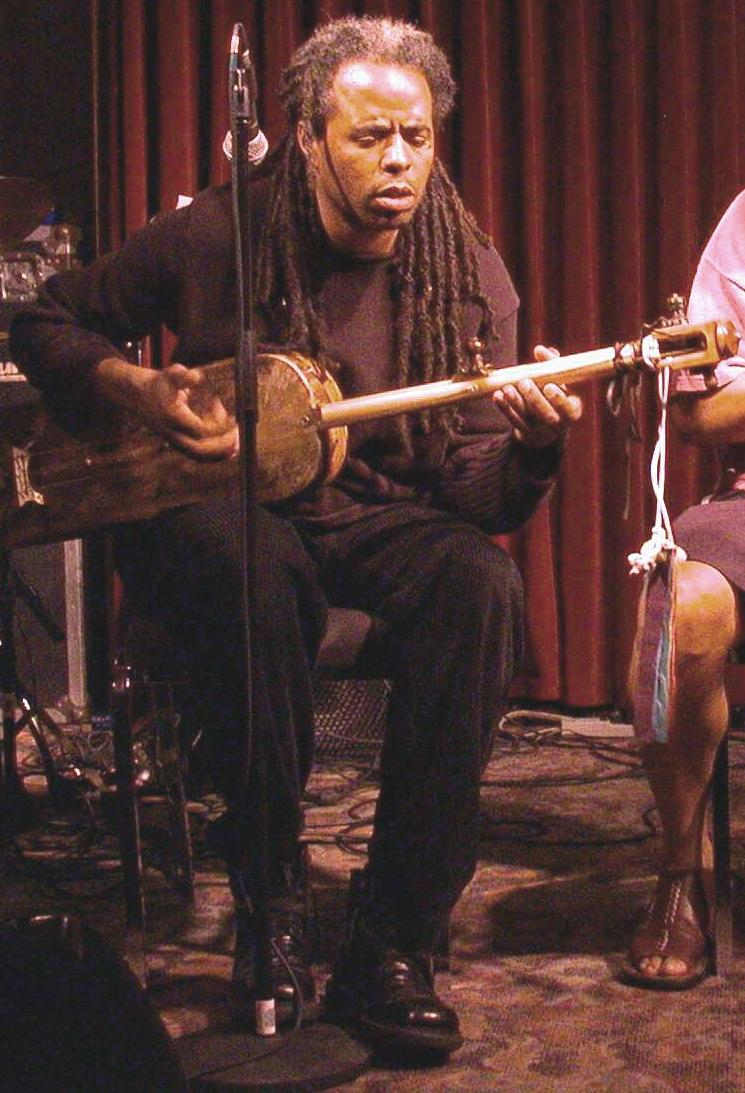
- Hassan Hakmoun performs on Jam Night at the Ottawa Jazz Festival in 2003.

Background information
- Born: 16 September 1963 (age 63); Morocco
- Genres: World fusion, Gnawa music
- Occupation: Musician
- Instruments: Vocals, percussion
- Years active: 1970s–present
- Label: Healing Records
- Website: hassanhakmoun.com

Hassan Hakmoun (Arabic: حسن حكمون) (born 16 September 1963) is a Moroccan musician who specializes in the Gnawa style.

== Early life ==
Hakmoun was born to a family of musicians who introduced him to the musical world of the Gnawa. By age four, he performed alongside great masters of the Gnawa all over Morocco (including king of the Gnawa genre, master Sam) and in Casablanca for Lila. His mother is known throughout the city as a mystic healer. At the age of fourteen he became Master of Gnawa music.

== Early life ==
Hakmoun began learning Gnawa music from his mother, a mystic healer in Marrakesh who organizes derdeba trance ceremonies, which are often all-night affairs involving hypnotic playing and chanting to exorcise spirits. Hakmoun witnessed his first trance ceremony at the young age of four. He proceeded to study Gnawa music after a musical ceremony that healed his sister Mina Hakmoun.

He eventually chose the sintir as his main instrument. By the age of fourteen, he was an established musician performing at Gnawa lila ceremonies with his own ensemble.

== Career ==
=== Later career ===
Hakmoun made his U.S. debut in 1987 at Lincoln Center in New York City with Etian and Blanca Lee'’s Trio Gna & Nomadas dance group. He subsequently relocated to New York where he was received by artists such as composer and producer Richard Horowitz and Peter Gabriel. He became a fixture in New York’s rock, jazz and fusion scenes, spanning multiple genres.

In 1989 Hakmoun became part of the group Magmouat Hakmoun with his brother Said and relatives Mohammed Bechar and Abdel Hok Dahmad. Later that year, with help from Robert Browning and the World Music Institute, Hakmoun produced and released his debut album Fire Within. He recorded his second album, "Gift of the Gnawa" with Adam Rudolph and jazz trumpeter Don Cherry in 1991.

Hakmoun began to expand his musical range, adding American sounds to the Moroccan form. This led him to form the group Zahar, meaning ‘luck’, whose music fused elements of rock and jazz with African styles. With the ensemble, Hakmoun recorded his first album featuring electric instruments and continued to perform around New York City. One such instance occurred during a performance at the Knitting Factory, whose audience members included Miles Davis, and Daniel Lanois, who proceeded to introduce Hakmoun to an important future collaborator, pop musician Peter Gabriel.

In 1992 Hakmoun joined Gabriel’s WOMAD, founded in 1980. Hakmoun released another album, Trance, at Gabriel's Real World Studios in Bath, England. From Bath, Hakmoun toured Europe, the Middle East and the U.S. along with other WOMAD artists, including performing under the group's auspices at the Woodstock 94 festival in 1994.

His albums Fire Within, Gift of the Gnawa and Trance topped the charts for World Music Albums, World Music Charts Europe, New World and CMJ's Radio Top 150 and were selected by Rolling Stone as one of the "Hot Picks of ’94. His powerful performances and sounds also resulted in letters of admiration from former New York City Mayor David Dinkins, television host Jay Leno and saxophonist David Sanborn, as well as from executives at the New York Times and the British Broadcasting Corporation.

=== 2002 - present ===
In 2002 Hakmoun teamed up with American-born producer Fabian Alsultany to record a new album, The Gift. The album included the release of the single, "This Gift," a duet with Grammy-winning singer-songwriter Paula Cole. In 2003 The Gift received an INDIE award for "Best Contemporary World Music Recording" from the Association for Independent Music (AFIM).

In addition to producing his own albums, Hakmoun has contributed to other artist’s recordings, adding to such projects as "Caravan" for Dee Dee Bridgewater’s album Prelude To A Kiss, Ozomatli’s Street Sings, which won the award for "Best Alternative Music Album" at the Latin Grammy Awards in 2005 and "Lovelight" for Paula Cole’s Courage in 2007.

Hakmoun has also composed and recorded for several films such as Rendezvous in Samarkand directed by Tim Bridwell, The Past and the Present of Djemma El Fna by Steve Montgomery and the documentary Footsteps in Africa. Hakmoun appeared in several movies as an actor, dancer and musician, including Disney’s Jungle 2 Jungle in 1997 and Rollerball by John McTiernan in 2002.

Today Hakmoun continues to record and perform in major festivals and venues around the globe, as well as give master workshops in universities. Hakmoun subsequently began a project in collaboration with other percussive dancers to create a new style of Gnawa dance.

== Personal life ==
Hakmoun was married to Lynne Francisco in 1987. They had a son. In June 2002, Hakmoun married fellow musician Paula Cole. They had a daughter. Hakmoun met Cole on the Peter Gabriel "Secret World Live" tour in 1994. The couple divorced in 2007.

== Discography ==
- Gift of the Gnawa (Flying Fish, 1992)
- Trance (Real World/Virgin/EMI, 1993)
- The Fire Within (Music of the World, 1995)
- Black Mud Sound (November 1995)
- Life Around the World (Mina, 1999)
- The Rough Guide to the Music of Morocco (World Music Network, 2004)
- Unity (Healing Records, 2014)
