= Ashkhabad (band) =

Turkmen folklore band

- Origin: Ashgabat, Turkmenistan
- Genres: Folklore
- Years active: 1993–2009
- Label: Real World Records
- Past members: Atabai Charykuliyev; Gasan Mamedov; Hakberdy Allamuradov; Kurban Kurbanov; Sabir Riazev

Ashkhabad was a Turkmen folklore band formed in Ashgabat, Turkmenistan.

== Members ==
- Atabai Charykuliev – vocal, tar
- Gasan Mamedov – violin, Honored Artist of Turkmenistan.
- Sabir Rizaev – clarinet, soprano saxophone, serp, nagara
- Kurban Kurbanov – accordion
- Hakberdy Allamuradov – dep, serp, nagara

== History ==
The musicians of the band individually built their careers by playing at weddings, at one of which lead singer Atabai Charykuliev was noticed by orientalist and producer Nazim Nadirov. Surviving a state campaign against Islamic wedding music (at one point, Charykuliev was confined to a mental institution for continuing to play), the dissolution of the Soviet Union enabled him to continue performing.

After several concert performances (including a performance on Turkmen television together with singer Aziza), he was awarded the title "Honorable Traditional Musician of the People" by the newly independent Turkmenistan.

Ashkhabad was soon formed as a Muslim wedding music supergroup, naming itself after the capital of Turkmenistan.

After one of the band's shows was recorded at a studio in Germany and given a tour in Europe, Charykuliev said that he owed all that he has to the President of Turkmenistan Saparmurat Niyazov.

On March 21, 2009, Charykuliev died in Ashgabat.

== Recordings and notable performances ==
In 1993, they were the first musical group from the former Soviet Union to be published under the label of Peter Gabriel – Real World (division of Virgin Records). Their album, City of Love (a literal translation of the band's name), found some popularity in Europe.

In 1998, together with Greek singer-songwriter Thanasis Papakonstantinou and Greek singer Melina Kana, released the album Loot ( Λαφυρα, Lafyra).

On 23 February 2000, they appeared on the television show Anthropology on channel NTV Russia and in 2002 on Channel One Russia's Nochnaya smena.

In 2002, the band performed concerts in Moscow and attended the First Moscow International Festival of Ethnic Music.
