= Screaming Orphans =

Irish pop / rock and folk band

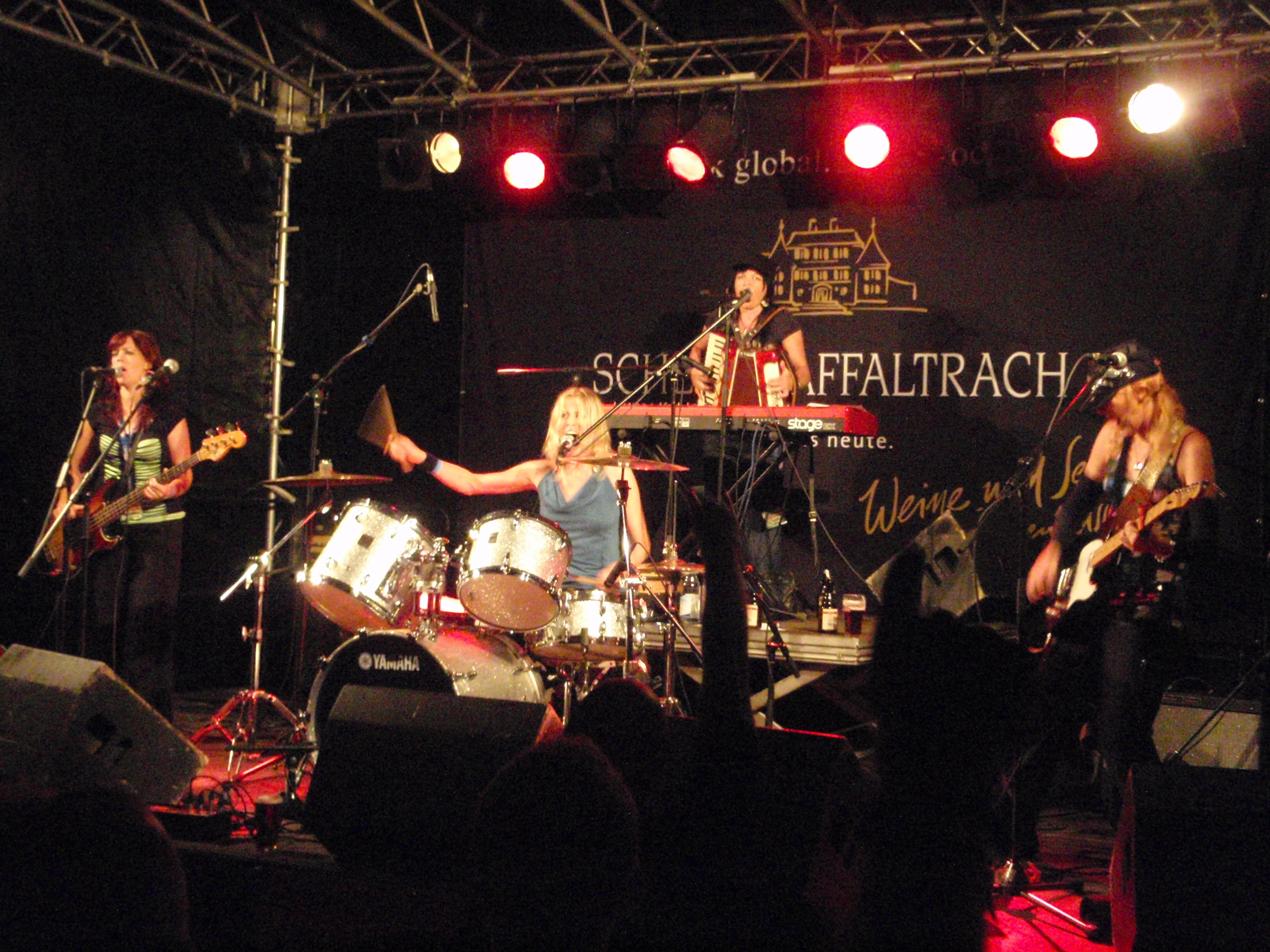
- Screaming Orphans at the "Folk im Schlosshof" festival 2010

Background information
- Origin: Bundoran, County Donegal, Ireland
- Genres: Pop, Celtic Rock, Folk Music, Traditional Irish Music
- Years active: 1995 – present
- Members: Joan Diver; Angela Diver; Gráinne Diver; Marie Thérèse Diver
- Website: http://www.screamingorphans.com

Screaming Orphans are a pop, rock and folk band from Bundoran, County Donegal, Ireland. The band consists of the four Diver sisters – Joan, Angela, Gráinne and Marie Thérèse. The group combines their own original melodic old-school pop songs with a modern take on traditional Irish music and song, inherited from their family roots.

They have released 14 albums and two EP's: Happy Christmas Vol. 1, Sunshine And Moss, Life in a Carnival, Taproom, Dance with Me e.p., Ballads Rule OK, Toy Theatre, Sliabh Liag, Lonely Boy, The Jacket's Green, East 12th Street, Belle's Isle, Circles, Back to Dublin, Screaming Orphans and Listen and Learn.

== Career ==
From an early age, the Diver sisters performed with their mother Kathleen Fitzgerald (a well-known céilí singer in Ireland) and when they hit their teenage years, they formed their own Celtic pop/rock band, Screaming Orphans. The band has toured the United States and Europe since the mid-1990s. In 1997, the band played as Sinéad O'Connor's opening band and her back-up singers on her Gospel Oak Tour across Europe, America and Canada. They have also toured with Baaba Maal and recorded with the Afro Celt Sound System and contributed backing vocals on the Peter Gabriel track When You're Falling. Screaming Orphans also did backing vocals on the Joni Mitchell's track Magdalene Laundries for The Chieftains' Tears of Stone album. They also contributed two tracks to the Jeremy Thomas film All the Little Animals, starring John Hurt and Christian Bale.

Screaming Orphans then signed to Blue Mountain Music Publishing, and a deal with Warner UK/WEA (Warner Music Group) followed. While they were with Warner UK (WEA), Screaming Orphans recorded their debut album, Listen and Learn, in Normandy, France, with Mike Hedges. Moria Bellas, CEO of WEA, subsequently departed from Warner when London Records took over and the album was then exclusively licensed from Warner Music to Mike Hedges' own label, 3 kHz Records.

In 2001, the band travelled back and forth to New York City to work on music with Funny Garbage. They then decided to make New York City their permanent base and started playing Irish festivals, colleges, universities and performing arts centres throughout the US.

Screaming Orphans continue to tour throughout the US and Europe. In summer of 2011, the band recorded Lonely Boy (pop album) and The Jacket's Green (Irish album). In spring of 2013, the band recorded their folk/Irish album Sliabh Liag and pop album Toy Theatre and in winter/spring 2015, Screaming Orphans recorded their folk/Irish album Ballads Rule OK. In the summer of 2015, the band released their pop EP, Dance with Me e.p. In the summer of 2017, the band recorded and released Taproom, a folk/Irish CD. Life in a Carnival (pop) was released in March 2019 and Sunshine And Moss (folk/Irish) came out in August 2020.

Screaming Orphans' 2017 Folk/Irish album aproom charted No. 1 in the iTunes World Music charts and top ten in the Billboard World Albums charts. The band was previously nominated by the Irish Music Awards for Best New Irish CD and have won the Top Celtic Rock band category. They were also included on the Ultimate Guide to Irish Folk album, released in 2014, which includes tracks from many of their musical heroes. Taproom was named 2017 Folk/Pop/Rock Album Of The Year by the Folk'n'Rock magazine.

The band's 2019 pop album Life in a Carnival was produced by producer John Reynolds and it charted in the top 25 in the iTunes Pop Music charts (U.S.), top 10 in the Billboard World Albums charts, No. 1 in the iTunes Singer/Songwriter charts (IE), and No. 3 in the overall iTunes music charts (IE).

During the 2020 COVID lockdown in Ireland, Screaming Orphans recorded Sunshine And Moss, an album of Irish, Scottish and American folk songs and tunes that they had played as children. Sunshine (light) to represent the good acts that came out of the pandemic and the moss (shade) to represent the hardship. The album received very positive reviews from critics and reached No.4 in the iTunes Singer/Songwriter charts in the U.S. and No.2 in the Singer/Songwriter charts in Ireland. It also received widespread radio airplay. Sunshine And Moss was chosen as album of the year by Manilla PR and one of the tracks, "Mary From Dungloe" was featured on BBC U.K. Mersey Folkscene selection for 2020.

In December 2021, Screaming Orphans released the band's first full Christmas album, Happy Christmas Vol. 1. The album received great press reviews and was played on numerous radios stations in U.K., Ireland and the U.S. A song from the album was also included on the R.T.E. One Recommended Christmas List.

== Members ==
- Angela Diver – bass, violin, vocals
- Joan Diver – drums, vocals
- Marie Thérèse Diver – keys, accordion, vocals
- Gráinne Diver – guitar, vocals

== Discography ==
- Happy Christmas Volume 2 (Christmas 2024)
- Happy Christmas Volume 1 (Christmas 2021)
- Sunshine And Moss (folk/Irish 2020)
- Life in a Carnival (pop 2019)
- Taproom (folk/Irish 2017)
- Dance with Me e.p. (pop 2015)
- Ballads Rule OK (folk/Irish 2015)
- Toy Theatre (pop 2013)
- Sliabh Liag (folk/Irish 2013)
- Lonely Boy (pop 2011)
- The Jacket's Green (folk/Irish 2011)
- East 12th Street (pop 2009)
- Belle's Isle (folk/Irish 2009)
- Circles (pop 2005)
- Back to Dublin (folk/Irish 2005)
- Screaming Orphans (pop 2003)
- Listen and Learn (pop 2001)
