= Iarla Ó Lionáird =

Irish singer and record producer

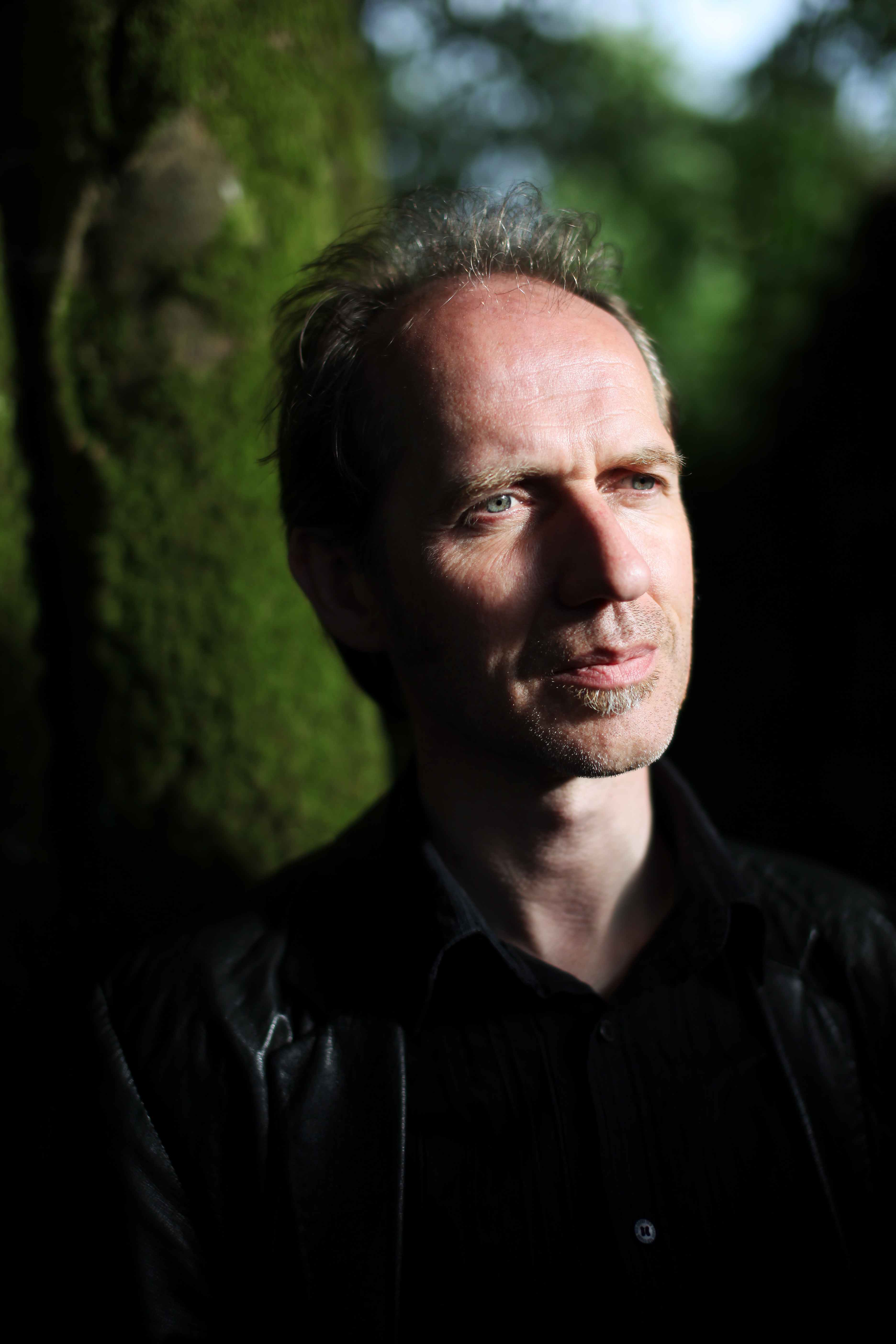
- Iarla Ó Lionáird in Woodstock Gardens, Inistioge, County Kilkenny in August 2011

Background information
- Origin: Baile Mhúirne, County Cork, Ireland
- Genres: Sean-nós; Experimental
- Occupations: Singer; Songwriter
- Instrument: Voice
- Label: Real World Records
- Website: http://www.iarla.com

Iarla Ó Lionáird (born 1963 or 1964) is an Irish singer and record producer. He sings in the traditional sean-nós style. He was a member of the Afro Celt Sound System and is a member of the Irish-American supergroup The Gloaming. He has recorded several solo albums for Real World Records. He appeared in the 2015 film Brooklyn singing an a cappella version of the Irish song "Casadh an tSúgáin".

== Early life ==
Ó Lionáird was born and raised in Baile Mhúirne in the West Cork Gaeltacht, a primarily Irish-speaking region. His father was a teacher and his mother and grandmother were singers in the traditional sean-nós style. Elizabeth Cronin, whose singing was recorded by Alan Lomax, was Ó Lionáird's great-aunt. Ó Lionáird was one of twelve children in his family.

Ó Lionáird first sang publicly at the age of five, and made his first radio broadcast at seven. At the age of twelve he recorded the traditional song "Aisling Gheal" for Gael Linn Records. He joined Seán Ó Riada's male voice choir Cór Chúil Aodha as a child and sang in the choir, directed after Sean Ó Riada's death by his son Peadar, until he was in his early twenties. Ó Lionáird earned a Bachelor of Education degree at Carysfort College in Dublin and was employed as a primary school teacher for seven years before making a career as a singer.

== Musical career ==
Ó Lionáird collaborated with Tony MacMahon and Noel Hill on Aislingí Ceoil – Music of Dreams, a live album of traditional Irish music recorded in Dublin in 1993 and released in 1994 by Gael Linn. Ó Lionáird performed three songs in sean-nós style with piano accompaniment.

Seeking a way to combine his role as a "culture-bearing" traditional singer with musical creativity in order to "make new music", Ó Lionáird was drawn to ambient music for its "capacity to accept ornate styles of music as part of its matrix". He has said that hearing Nusrat Fateh Ali Khan singing on Peter Gabriel's album Passion was a "light bulb moment" which made him think that sean-nós could also "inhabit this ambient soundscape". Ó Lionáird wrote to Peter Gabriel asking for a chance to record on Gabriel's Real World Records. Gabriel invited him to a "recording week" at his studio, which led to his membership in the Afro Celt Sound System. Ó Lionáird joined the session in July 1995 at which Volume 1: Sound Magic was recorded. He appeared on the group's five subsequent studio recordings. He also sings on the Peter Gabriel album OVO.

Ó Lionáird has released three solo albums on the Real World Records label. The Seven Steps to Mercy (1997) was produced by Michael Brook. The production incorporated sampled nature sounds Ó Lionáird had recorded himself. The album includes a recording of the fourteen-year old Ó Lionáird singing "Aisling Gheal" in 1978. It was followed in 2005 by Invisible Fields, which Ó Lionáird produced himself, and in 2011 by Foxlight, which was produced by Leo Abrahams. His 2000 album I Could Read the Sky, also on Real World Records, is the soundtrack to the 1999 film of the same name. He sings on Áilleacht, a 2005 album by Pádraigín Ní Uallacháin.

Several composers, including Gavin Bryars and Donnacha Dennehy, have written works for Ó Lionáird. Bryars first wrote a song arrangement for voice and viols that appeared on the 2005 album Invisible Fields. He went on to write a major work, Anáil Dé (The Breath of God) for Ó Lionáird and members of the Crash Ensemble. Ó Lionáird suggested the title and the texts for the piece, which is based on a collection of Irish prayers and poems. It was performed for the first time in Dublin in November 2008.

Ó Lionáird collaborated with Donnacha Dennehy during Dennehy's research for and composition of Grá agus Bás, a work that "incorporates traditional sean nos singing within a contemporary music idiom". Commissioned by Trinity College, Dublin, the work was first performed in Dublin in February 2007 by Ó Lionáird and the Crash Ensemble with Alan Pierson conducting. It had its United States premiere at the Merkin Concert Hall in New York City in March 2007, in what the New York Times called a "powerful account" of a "magnificently energetic, wildly cacophonous vocal work". Ó Lionáird sang the piece at Carnegie Hall in May 2013 in a concert of Dennehy's music with the Crash Ensemble and Dawn Upshaw. Nonesuch Records released a CD recording entitled Grá Agus Bás containing this and other works by Dennehy in May 2011.

Along with fiddlers Martin Hayes and Caoimhín Ó Raghallaigh, guitarist Dennis Cahill, and pianist Doveman, Ó Lionáird is a member of The Gloaming, an Irish-American supergroup whose self-titled first album was released in 2014, winning the Meteor Choice Music Prize for Irish album of the year.

From September 2016 Ó Lionáird appeared in The Hunger, an opera by Donnacha Dennehy about the Great Famine.

For the 2025 film Sinners, he arranged the version of "Rocky Road to Dublin" on which actor Jack O'Connell sings lead and contributed the sean-nós vocals to the opening sequence.

== Other work ==
In 2013, University College Cork appointed Ó Lionáird the School of Music and Theatre's first Traditional Artist in Residence. In that capacity he gave lectures and taught sean-nós singing, as well as performing.

Ó Lionáird appears in the 2015 film Brooklyn. He has said that he was reluctant to take the role "because I'm not an actor" but that he decided to accept when he learned that Colm Tóibín, the author of the novel on which the film was based, had asked the film's director to ask him. Ó Lionáird plays Frankie Doran, a poor workingman who sings the traditional song "Casadh an tSúgáin" (Twisting the Rope) during Christmas dinner at a soup kitchen.

In May 2015, Ó Lionáird hosted a five-part radio documentary series about singing entitled Vocal Chords, which drew on "personal experience, academic contributions and a global cast of vocalists" including Sinéad O'Connor and Christy Moore.

== Personal life ==
Ó Lionáird earned a Master of Arts degree in ethnomusicology from the University of Limerick in 2003. He lives in Inistioge in County Kilkenny with his wife Eimear and their three children.

== Discography ==
=== Solo albums ===
- The Seven Steps To Mercy, September 1997
- I Could Read the Sky (soundtrack), June 2000
- Invisible Fields, August 2005
- Foxlight, September 2011

=== Albums With The Afro Celt Sound System ===
- Volume 1: Sound Magic (1996)
- Volume 2: Release (1999)
- Volume 3: Further in Time (2001)
- Seed (2003)
- Pod (Remix album) (2004)
- Volume 5: Anatomic (2005)
- Capture: 1995–2010 (2010) (compilation)

=== Other albums ===
- Tony MacMahon, Iarla Ó Lionáird & Noel Hill – Aislingi Ceoil / Music Of Dreams (Gael Linn, 1994)
- Donnacha Dennehy – Grá Agus Bás (Nonesuch Records, 2011)
- Cork Gamelan Ensemble – The Three Forges (Diatribe Records, 2015)
- Pádraigín Ní Uallacháin – Áilleacht (2005)
