= The Imagined Village =

Folk music project in the United Kingdom

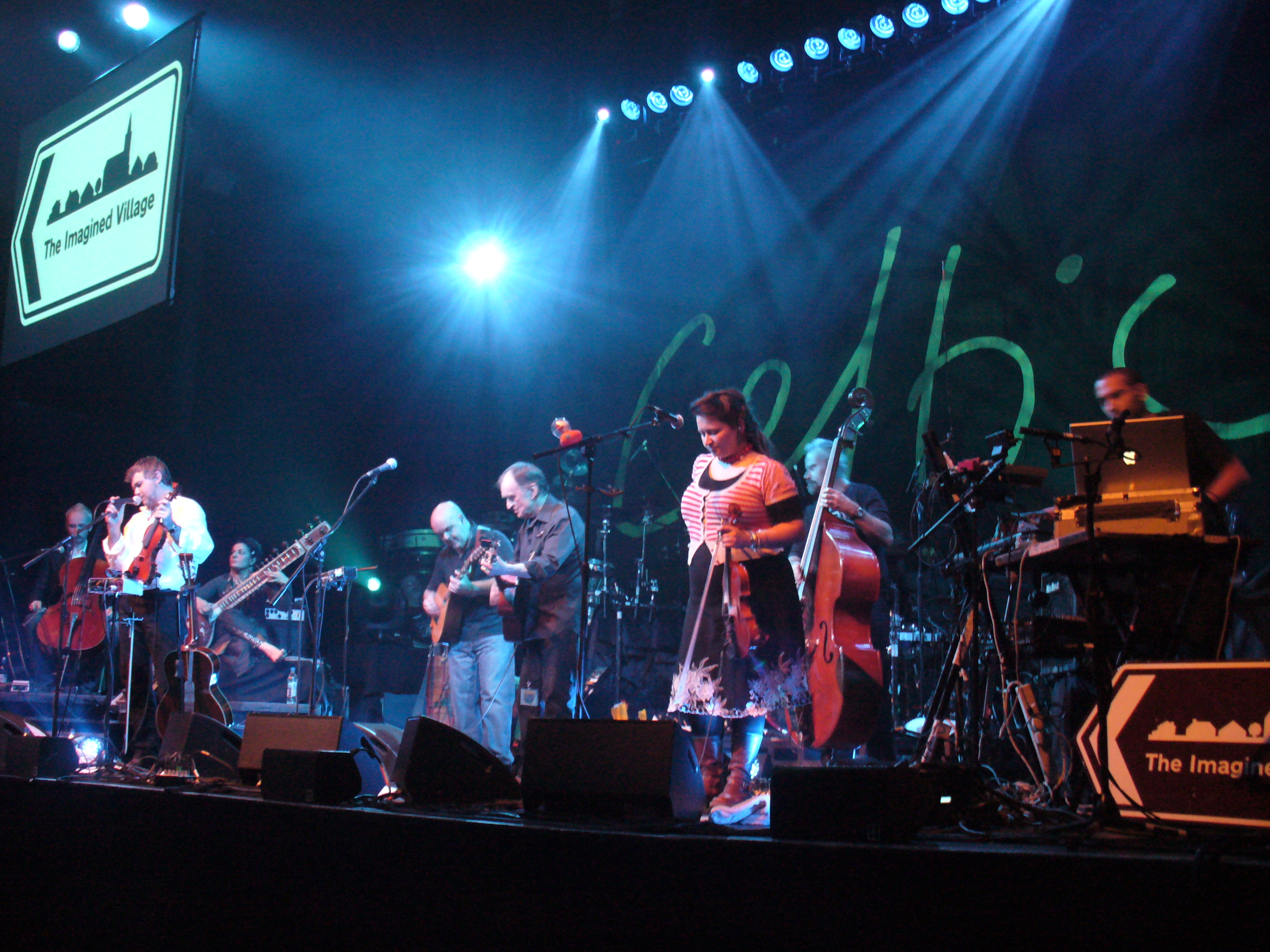
- The Imagined Village playing in 2010

Background information
- Origin: United Kingdom
- Genres: Contemporary folk; Worldbeat; Folktronica; Dub Poetry; World Fusion; Bhangra
- Years active: 2004–present
- Label: ECC
- Website: theimaginedvillage.com

The Imagined Village is a folk music project founded by Simon Emmerson of Afro Celt Sound System. A reflection of modern United Kingdom multiculturalism, the music collective syncretizes diverse musical traditions while featuring musicians from several cultural backgrounds. The name of the project comes from the 1993 book, The Imagined Village, by Georgina Boyes.

The project started in 2004, and led to the release of an eponymous album in 2007 by a collective of artists on Real World Records. Some of the tracks on it are modern re-interpretations of traditional folk songs. Benjamin Zephaniah was awarded Best Original Song in the Hancocks 2008, Talkawhile Awards for Folk Music (as voted by members of Talkawhile.co.uk) for "Tam Lyn Retold". He collected the award at The Cambridge Folk Festival on 2 August 2008.

The Imagined Village E.P. was released earlier in 2007, and is a remix of the album tracks. The 2008 BBC Radio 2 Folk Awards voted "Cold, Hailey, Rainy Night" as best traditional track.

In 2009, the project moved to a new record label, ECC Records, and a second album, Empire & Love was released in January 2010, followed by Bending the Dark in May 2012.

== Discography ==
=== The Imagined Village ===
The Imagined Village

Studio album by Various Artists
- Released: 2007
- Recorded: 2007
- Genres: Folk, dub poetry, world fusion
- Label: Real World Records
- Producer: Virgin Records

Professional ratings
Review scores
| Source | Rating |
|---|---|
| AllMusic | link |

| No. | Title | Main Artists | Length |
|---|---|---|---|
| 1. | "'Ouses 'Ouses 'Ouses" | John Copper and Sheila Chandra | 6:20 |
| 2. | "John Barleycorn" | Martin Carthy, Eliza Carthy and Paul Weller | 5:42 |
| 3. | "Tam Lyn Retold" | Benjamin Zephaniah and Eliza Carthy | 9:22 |
| 4. | "Death and the Maiden Retold" | Tunng | 3:48 |
| 5. | "Cold, Hailey, Rainy Night" | Eliza Carthy, Chris Wood, Transglobal Underground and The Young Copper Family | 6:10 |
| 6. | "Welcome Sailor" | Sheila Chandra and Chris Wood | 5:44 |
| 7. | "Acres of Ground" | Eliza Carthy | 4:47 |
| 8. | "Pilsdon Pen" | The Village Band | 5:17 |
| 9. | "Hard Times of Old England Retold" | Billy Bragg, Simon Emmerson, The Young Copper Family and Eliza Carthy | 5:38 |
| 10. | "Kit Whites 1 & 2" | The Gloworms | 4:44 |
| 11. | "Sloe on the Uptake" | Tiger Moth | 3:33 |

=== The Imagined Village E.P. ===
The Imagined Village E.P.

Studio album by Various Artists
- Released: 2007
- Recorded: 2007
- Genres: Folk, dub poetry, world fusion
- Label: Real World Records

| No. | Title | Main Artists | Length |
|---|---|---|---|
| 1. | "England Half English meets John Barleycorn" | Billy Bragg, Martin Carthy, Eliza Carthy |
| 2. | "Acres of Ground (beats mix)" | Eliza Carthy |
| 3. | "Welcome Sailor" | Sheila Chandra, Chris Wood |
| 4. | "Cold Hailey, Rainy Night (It's Turned Out Nice mix)" | Transglobal Underground |

=== Empire & Love ===
Empire & Love

Studio album by The Imagined Village
- Released: 2010
- Genres: Folk, world fusion
- Label: Proper

Professional ratings
Review scores
| Source | Rating |
|---|---|
| AllMusic | link |
| The Guardian | link |

| No. | Title | Length |
|---|---|---|
| 1. | "My Son John" | 6:09 |
| 2. | "Sweet Jane" | 7:47 |
| 3. | "Space Girl" | 3:55 |
| 4. | "Byker Hill" | 6:02 |
| 5. | "Scarborough Fair" | 6:50 |
| 6. | "Mermaid" | 6:05 |
| 7. | "The Handweaver and the Factory Maid" | 5:08 |
| 8. | "Lark in the Morning" | 4:09 |
| 9. | "Rosebuds in June" / "Mrs Preston's Hornpipe" | 6:45 |
| 10. | "Cum on Feel the Noize" | 4:12 |
| 11. | "Scarborough Fair (string reprise)" | 6:50 |

=== Bending the Dark ===
Bending the Dark

Studio album by The Imagined Village
- Released: 2012
- Label: ECC Records

| No. | Title | Length |
|---|---|---|
| 1. | "The Captain's Apprentice" | 1:25 |
| 2. | "New York Trader" | 6:22 |
| 3. | "Winter Singing" | 4:44 |
| 4. | "The Guvna" | 6:09 |
| 5. | "Sick Old Man" | 6:29 |
| 6. | "Next" | 4:43 |
| 7. | "Fisherman" | 4:05 |
| 8. | "Get Kalsi" | 5:41 |
| 9. | "Washing Song" | 3:29 |
| 10. | "Bending the Dark" | 12:21 |

== Line-ups ==
The Imagined Village live band have toured since November 2007. The original lineup consisted of Billy Bragg, Martin Carthy, Eliza Carthy, Sheila Chandra, Chris Wood and The Young Coppers, backed by a band featuring Simon Emmerson, Johnny Kalsi, Francis Hylton, Andy Gangadeen, Sheema Mukherjee and Barney Morse Brown. They also appeared on Later with Jools Holland.

A revised lineup was announced for their 2010 tour, coinciding with the release of Empire & Love: Martin Carthy, Eliza Carthy, and Chris Wood, backed by a band featuring Simon Emmerson, Johnny Kalsi, Ali Friend, Andy Gangadeen, Simon Richmond, Sheema Mukherjee and Barney Morse Brown.

In 2011 Jackie Oates replaced Chris Wood for their live performances including at the Shrewsbury Folk Festival. The musicians credited on Bending the Dark (2012) were Eliza Carthy, Martin Carthy, Simon Emmerson, Ali Friend, Andy Gangadeen, Johnny Kalsi, Sheema Mukherjee, Barney Morse Brown, Jackie Oates and Simon Richmond.
