= A Goat's Song =

1994 novel by Dermot Healy

A Goat's Song is a 1994 novel by Dermot Healy. It is considered by others as his finest and most famous work.

According to Michael Harding's critique of the book, Healy "excelled himself in revealing the Irish male as the dreamer, the broken thing that a man becomes when the women have gone away." The book centres on playwright Jack Ferris, his love affair with Catherine Adams and her father Jonathan, an RUC sergeant.
