= Creole Choir of Cuba =

Cuban musical group

The Creole Choir of Cuba (Spanish: Coro Criollo de Cuba) is a Cuban musical group. Its members are Rogelio Torriente, Fidel Miranda, Teresita Miranda, Marcelo Luis, Dalio Vital, Emilia Diaz Chavez, Yordanka Fajardo, Irian Montejo, Marina Fernandes and Yara Diaz. The group is signed to Peter Gabriel's record label Real World Records, an artist who also is the founder of WOMAD.

== History ==
The Creole Choir celebrate the history of their Haitian descendants enslaved to the Caribbean from West Africa. The Creole Choir's ten remarkable singers come from Camagüey, Cuba's third city, down towards the eastern end of the island. They grew up and studied music in this old colonial town, designated a UNESCO World heritage Site in 2008 for its colonial architecture. They have nurtured music passed down in their families since the early 19th century, gradually adding modern Haitian sounds following their own first visit to a Haitian festival in 1996.

The choir was founded in 1994 during the 'Special Period' when the Cuban economy fell into a black hole following the end of the USSR and of Soviet support for the revolution. Food was short while homes and work places often went dark due to lack of electricity. It was at this difficult time that members of the Professional Choir of Camagüey who were descendants of Haitians, decided to re-forge the resistance songs and laments of their forebears. Led by their Choir Director Emilia Díaz Chávez, Grupo Vocal Desandann, as they are called in Cuba, revived the songs of their ancestors for modern times. Desandann literally means 'descendants' and as the choir say: "For us music is like food, it feeds the spirit and is a major inspiration for everyday life".

Songs are sung in creole, Cuba's second language, first created by slaves by fusing words together words from their African languages, the Taíno language of Caribbean indigenous people, with French, Spanish and English. Creole was spoken by the choir's parents, grandparents and great grandparents, people doubly displaced, first from Africa then from Haiti. The first wave of Haitians were brought to Cuba as slaves to work in the sugar plantations of the French aristocracy who fled Haiti after the slave revolts of the 1790s. Subsequent waves of Haitians came to the island during 19th and early 20th century, and again in the 1950s during the brutal dictatorship of Papa Doc Duvalier. All lived in the countryside in conditions akin to slavery enduring harsh discrimination until the 1959 Revolution brought with it literacy, education and equality.

The Creole Choir describe each of their songs as being 'like a small film' filled with vitality, humour and compassion. They tell stories of survival despite abject poverty, of heroes who defied colonial masters, of ghosts at the crossroads, of enduring love, of homesickness for family, of abandonment but never loss of hope, mother's laments and prayers, of the desire for freedom. With irresistible melodies driven by richly textured harmonies, shifting Caribbean rhythms with a very original root bass sound, this is impassioned singing by a unique group.

The group recently made an appearance on BBC Two's Later... with Jools Holland performing their single, the uplifting and emotional Chen Nan Ren.

The Choir have two albums, Tande-La (2011) and Santiman (2013).

== See also ==
- Real World Records
