= Helmut Kollars =

Austrian children's author and illustrator

- Born: Helmut Kollars; 1968 (age 57–58); Graz, Austria
- Spouse: Pina Kollars
- Website: http://www.helmutkollars.de

Helmut Kollars (born 1968 in Graz) is an Austrian illustrator and writer of children's books.

== Biography ==
Kollars first set up a business as a freelance illustrator in Vienna. Stifled by laws in Austria that required artists to carry health insurance, Kollars moved his family to Cork, Ireland, in 1997. He established a company there and carried on a successful career as an illustrator for publishing and advertising in Ireland, Belgium and the US. He eventually moved his business back to Europe and settled in Kassel, Germany. Along with illustrations in books, his poster art is widely available.

== Works ==
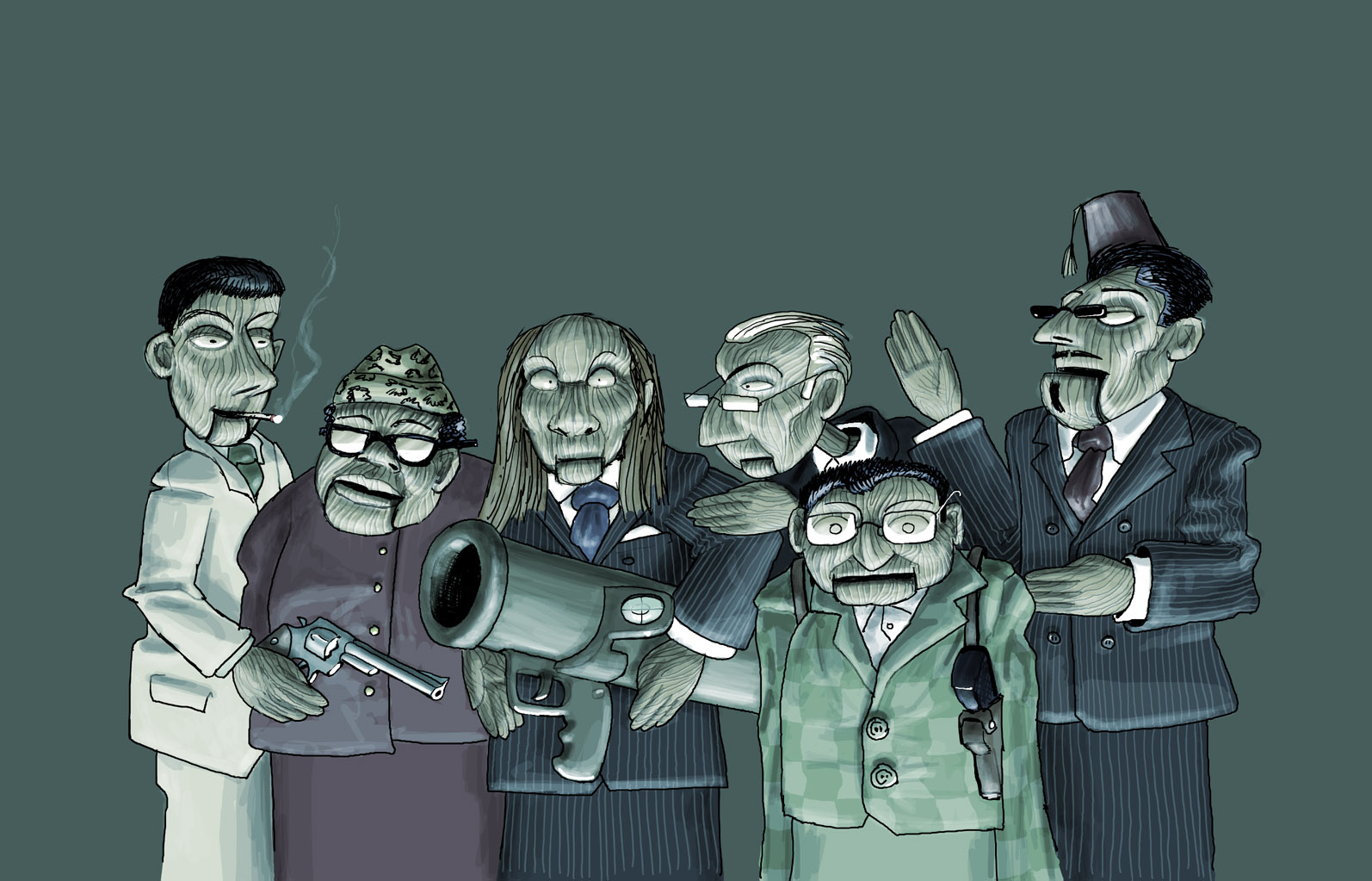
Helmut Kollars' illustration "The Puppets from 'Fudge 44'"

Besides his illustrations for other authors, Kollars has written and illustrated several children's books of his own. Selected titles include:

- Es war einmal ein Zauberer ganz allein, 1996
- Der Vergessene Zauberspruch, 1997
- Mein Bilderbuch von der Baustelle, 2005
- Bingo! Lernquartett - Die 4 Fälle / Kurze Märchen: 3. Klasse Grundschule, 2005
- Lernquartett: Die 4 Fälle, 2005
- Sterreich-Atlas fnr Kinder, 2007

== Awards ==
Two of Kollars' children's books published by Annette Betz have won awards.

- Es war einmal ein Zauberer ganz allein, 1996
- Braver Bertram - Wilde Winni, 1996

== Personal life ==
In Vienna Kollars met the young singer, songwriter and guitarist Pina Pertl. The couple eloped to Scotland, returned briefly to Vienna and then permanently relocated to Ireland where Kollars set up his business as an illustrator. The couple had a daughter, Luise Magdalena, but divorced before the recording of Pina Kollars' first album Quick Look.
