= Dermot Healy =

Irish writer (1947–2014)

- Born: 9 November 1947; Finnea, County Westmeath, Ireland
- Died: 29 June 2014 (aged 66); Ballyconnell, Sligo, Ireland
- Occupation: Writer
- Writing career
- Genres: Novels, plays, poetry, short stories
- Notable works: A Goat's Song (1994), Sudden Times (1999), Long Time, No See (2011)

Dermot Healy (9 November 1947 – 29 June 2014) was an Irish novelist, playwright, poet and short story writer. A member of Aosdána, Healy was also part of its governing body, the Toscaireacht. Born in Finea, County Westmeath, he lived in County Sligo, and was described variously as a "master", a "Celtic Hemingway" and as "Ireland's finest living novelist".

Often overlooked due to his relatively low public profile, Healy's work is admired by his Irish literary predecessors, peers and successors alike, many of whom idolise him—among the writers to have spoken highly of him are Seamus Heaney, Eugene McCabe, Roddy Doyle, Patrick McCabe and Anne Enright. He won several literary awards, and was nominated for both the Booker Prize and the International Dublin Literary Award.

== Life ==
Healy was born in Finea, County Westmeath, the son of a Guard. When Healy was a child, the family moved to Cavan, where he attended the local secondary school. In his late teens, he moved to London and worked in a succession of jobs, including barman, security man and a labourer. He later returned to Ireland, settling in Ballyconnell, County Sligo, a small settlement on the Atlantic coast.

He died at his home on 29 June 2014, aged 66, while awaiting an ambulance after suddenly being taken ill. He was laid to rest at Carrigans Cemetery following funeral mass by Fr. Michael Donnelly at St Patrick's Church in Maugherow.

== Style ==
Healy's work is influenced by an eclectic range of writers from around the world, including Anna Akhmatova, John Arden, Isaac Babel, Bashō, Samuel Beckett, Jorge Luis Borges, Angela Carter, J. M. Coetzee, Emily Dickinson, Maria Edgeworth, T. S. Eliot, Hermann Hesse, Nâzım Hikmet, Aidan Higgins, Miroslav Holub, Eugène Ionesco, Franz Kafka, Mary Lavin, Federico García Lorca, Guy de Maupassant, Edgar Allan Poe, Sylvia Plath, Ezra Pound, William Shakespeare and Robert Louis Stevenson. Healy wrote in a shed (though, on being a writer, he was quoted as saying: "I know writing is what I do but I still don't see myself as one") and was fascinated by etymology.

== Recognition ==
Healy won the Hennessy Award (1974 and 1976), the Tom Gallon Award (1983), and the Encore Award (1995). He was longlisted for the Booker Prize with his 1994 novel A Goats Song. In 2011, he was shortlisted for the Poetry Now Award for his 2010 poetry collection, A Fool's Errand. His 2011 novel Long Time, No See was nominated for the International Dublin Literary Award, the world's most valuable literary award for a single work in the English language, by libraries in Russia and Norway.

== List of works ==
=== Fiction ===
- Banished Misfortune (London: Allison & Busby, 1982), collected short stories
- Fighting with Shadows (London: Allison & Busby 1984)
- A Goat's Song (London: Collins Harvill, 1994)
- Sudden Times (London: The Harvill Press, 1999)
- Long Time, No See (Faber and Faber, 2011)
- The Collected Short Stories (Dalkey Archive Press, 2015)

=== Autobiography ===
- The Bend for Home (Harvill, 1996)

=== Plays ===
- Here and There and Going to America (1985)
- The Long Swim (1988)
- Curtains (1990)
- On Broken Wings (1992)
- Last Night's Fun (1994)
- Boxes (1998)
- Mister Staines (1999)
- Metagama (2005)
- A Night at the Disco (2006)
- The Collected Plays (Dalkey Archive Press, 2016)

=== Poetry ===
- Neighbours' Lights (1992)
- The Ballyconnell Colours (1995)
- What the Hammer (1998)
- The Reed Bed (2001)
- A Fool's Errand (The Gallery Press, 2010)

== Film ==
- The Butcher Boy (1997) [as an actor]
- I Could Read the Sky (1999) [as an actor]
- The Guard (2011) [as an actor]
