= Ronan Browne =

Irish musician and composer

- Born: 1965 (age 60–61); Dublin, Ireland
- Genres: Irish music
- Occupations: Musician, composer
- Instruments: Uilleann pipes, Flute, Whistle
- Years active: 1982–present
- Website: ronanbrowne.com

Ronan Browne is an Irish musician and composer who plays the Irish pipes.

== Early years ==
Browne was born in Dublin to psychiatrist Ivor Browne and Orla Kiernan. His family has some history in music, with his maternal grandmother being Irish folk singer Delia Murphy.

== Career ==
Browne has been a member of several musical groups, including CRAN and the Afro Celt Sound System. He also was the original uilleann piper with the stage show Riverdance. He has also released several albums with Peter O'Loughlin, a longtime friend of his.

== Selected discography ==
=== Solo ===
- Celtic Moods (1997)
- The Wynd You Know (2001) – Traditional pipes solo CD
- Salute to the Brave (2005) – with the Patriot Corps

=== With Cran ===
- The Crooked Stair (1995/2006)
- Black, Black, Black (1998) – with Shel Talmy
- Lover's Ghost (2000)
- Music from the Edge of the World (2003)
- Dally And Stray (2014)

=== With Peter O'Loughlin ===
- The South West Wind (1988)
- Touch me if you Dare (2002)
- The Thing Itself (2004) – with Maeve Donnelly
- Geantraí (2006) – TV performance (CD & DVD)
- The Legacy (2015)

=== With Afro Celt Sound System ===
- Volume 1: Sound Magic (1996)
- Volume 2: Release (1999)
- Capture 1995-2010 (2010)

=== With Transatlantic Sessions ===
- Transatlantic Sessions 2 (1998)
- Transatlantic Sessions 3 (2007)
- Transatlantic Sessions 4 (2009)

=== With others ===
- Taobh na Greine/Under the Sun (1994) – with Seosaimhín Ní Bheaglaoich and Dónal Lunny
- Branohm/The Voyage of Bran (1994) – with Maire Breathnach
- Riverdance: Music from the Show (1995)
- Secret of Roan Inish (1995) – soundtrack to the film
- River of Sound (1995) – Accompanying the TV series
- When I Was Young (1996) – with Pádraigín Ní Uallacháin & Len Graham
- Celtic Tenors (1998) – Volume 1
- The Crossing (1999) – with Tim O'Brien
- Celtic Tenors (2000) – Volume 2
- Journey – Best of Dónal Lunny (2001)
- The Irish Tenors (2001) – Ellis Island Guest
- Celtic Tenors (2002) – Volume 3 (So Strong: "Pipes on The Green Fields of France" and "Mull of Kintyre")
- Celtic Tiger (2005) – Soundtrack to Flatley's show
