= Remmy Ongala =

Tanzanian musician

- Born: Ramazani Mtoro Ongala; 10 February 1947; Kindu, Belgian Congo (modern-day Democratic Republic of the Congo)
- Origin: Dar es Salaam, Tanzania
- Died: 13 December 2010 (aged 63) Dar es Salaam, Tanzania
- Genres: Congolese rumba
- Occupations: Singer, guitarist, songwriter
- Instruments: Vocals, electric guitar

Ramazani "Remmy" Mtoro Ongala (10 February 1947 – 13 December 2010) was a Tanzanian guitarist and singer.

== Life ==
Ongala was born in Kindu, in what was the Belgian Congo at the time, and now is the Democratic Republic of the Congo.

A rising musician since the 1980s, Remmy Ongala performed in bands from the age of sixteen, learning his craft from his father, who was a well-respected, traditional musician. He was part of the Congolese rumba scene. In 1978 he travelled to Dar es Salaam where he joined Orchestra Makassy. Later with his own band, Orchestre Super Matimila (named after the businessman who owned the band's instruments), he helped to transmit the soukous style to the Tanzanian musical subculture often called Ubongo, the Swahili word for brain. This in turn contributed to the development of Tanzanian hip-hop, particularly in the city of Dar es Salaam during the 1990s.

The use of his music as a social instrument led him to address concerns in his hometown that entailed social issues including poverty, AIDS/HIV, urbanization and family life. Known as the Sauti ya Mnyonge (voice of the poor man), his fight was strong.

Ubongo is usually perceived by artists and listeners alike as "conscious" music, a style that actively contributes socio-political commentary to the Tanzanian soundscape. Believing in the abolition of racism and social injustice, Ongala infused his lyrics with these messages. His inspiring and sometimes didactic message led him to be nicknamed "Dr Remmy".

Following the end of British colonial rule in 1961, Julius Nyerere preached the value of Ujamaa, or familyhood, as a basic constituent of Tanzanian nationalism, placing an emphasis on equality and justice. This became a recurring theme in many Tanzanian artists' music, including Remmy Ongala's.

His song "Kipenda Roho" was used in Oliver Stone's film, Natural Born Killers.

Ongala died on 13 December 2010 at his home in Dar es Salaam. Posthumously, he received the Hall of Fame trophy at the 2012 Tanzania Music Awards.

== See also ==
- Songs for the Poor Man (Ongala album, 1989)
