= Science Photo Library =

British stock photography and footage company

- Company type: Private
- Industry: stock photography, stock footage
- Founded: 1979
- Headquarters: London, United Kingdom
- Key people: Michael Marten (founder)
- Website: https://www.sciencephoto.com

Science Photo Library (registered as Science Photo Library Limited) is a privately owned stock photography and stock footage agency that specializes in scientific and medical images and videos. Its headquarters are in London, United Kingdom.

In addition to its commercial aims, Science Photo Library uses its media to sponsor and contribute to events aimed at popularising science to children, through educational multimedia competitions, and to the wider public through exhibitions such as From Earth to the Universe as part of the International Year of Astronomy, and its 2011 collaboration with RIA Novosti to showcase archive material covering the first human spaceflight by Yuri Gagarin.
