= James McNally (musician) =

British musician

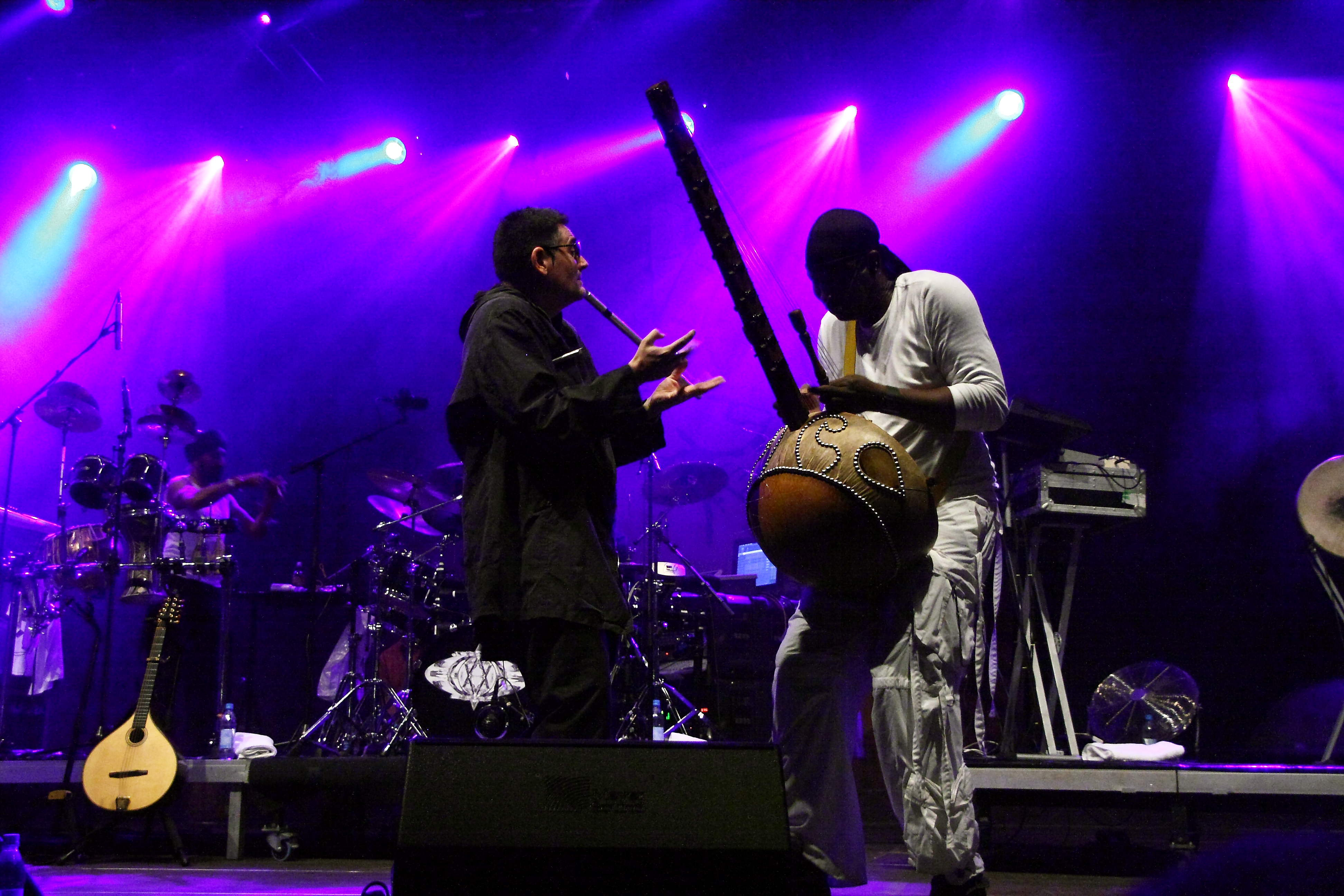
James McNally (l) and N'Faly Kouyate with Afro Celt Sound System at TFF Rudolstadt, 2010

James McNally is a British musician, composer and producer, formerly of the bands Afro Celt Sound System, the Pogues, Storm. and Dingle Spike.

He released a solo album, Everybreath, in 2008, which included covers of U2's "I Still Haven't Found What I'm Looking For" and The Police's "Every Breath You Take".

== Awards ==
McNally was nominated twice for Grammy Awards for Best World Music Album, in 2002 for Volume 2: Release and again in 2004 for Volume 3: Further in Time.
