= Afro Celt Sound System =

British band

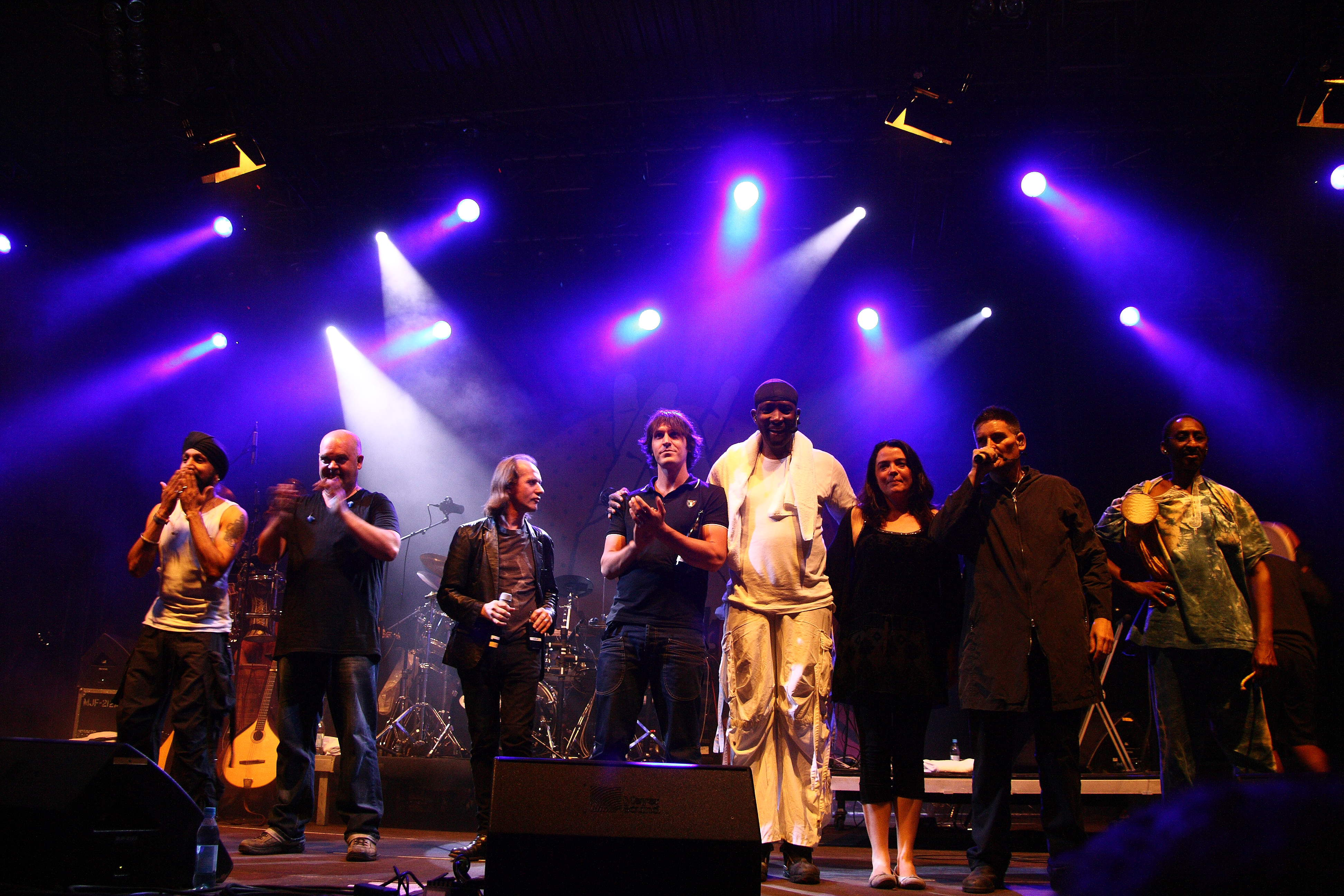
- Afro Celt Soundsystem in 2010. L–R: Johnny Kalsi, Simon Emmerson, Iarla Ó Lionáird, Ian Markin, N'Faly Kouyate, Emer Mayock, James McNally, Moussa Sissokho.

Background information
- Also known as: ACSS, Afrocelts
- Origin: London, England
- Genres: Electronic rock, folk rock, Celtic rock, Afrobeat
- Years active: 1995–present
- Labels: Real World, EEC, Six Degrees
- Members: N'Faly Kouyate; Enda Galler; Tara Howle; Binta Suso; Kalifa Koné; Mùlù (Miadhachlughain O'Donnell)
- Past members: Johnny Kalsi; Simon Emmerson († 2023); James McNally; Martin Russell; Iarla Ó Lionáird; Ronan Browne; James Maho; Moussa Sissokho; Griogair Labhruidh; Rioghnach Connelly; Emer Mayock; Demba Barry; Myrdhin; Simon Massey; Jo Bruce († 1997)
- Website: afroceltsoundsystem.com

Afro Celt Sound System are a folk rock group who fuse electronic music with traditional Gaelic and West African music. The band was formed in 1995 by producer-guitarist Simon Emmerson and features a wide range of guest artists. In 2003, they temporarily changed their name to Afrocelts before reverting to their original name.

Their albums have been released through Peter Gabriel's Real World Records, and they have frequently performed at WOMAD festivals worldwide. Their recording contract with Real World was for five albums, of which Volume 5: Anatomic was the last. After a number of festival dates in 2007, the band went on hiatus. In 2010, they regrouped to play a number of shows (including a return to WOMAD), and released a remastered retrospective titled Capture. In May 2014, Afro Celt Sound System announced the release of the album Born. In January 2016, a posting on their website revealed that due to a dispute with Emmerson, who announced his departure from the band in 2015, there were two active versions of the band, one led by Emmerson and another with a separate line-up headed by James McNally and Martin Russell. Emmerson's version of the band released the album The Source in 2016. The dispute ended in December 2016 with an announcement on social media. The band released their seventh studio album, Flight, in November 2018.

== History ==
=== Formation ===
The inspiration behind the project dates back to 1991, when British producer/guitarist Simon Emmerson collaborated with Afro-pop star Baaba Maal. While making an album with Maal in Senegal, Emmerson was struck by the similarity between one African melody and a traditional Irish air. Back in London, Irish musician Davy Spillane told Emmerson about a belief that nomadic Celts lived in Africa or India before they migrated to Western Europe. Whether or not the theory was true, Emmerson was intrigued by the two regions' musical affinities.

In an experiment that would prove successful, Emmerson brought two members of Baaba Maal's band together with traditional Irish musicians to see what kind of music the two groups would create. Adding a dash of modern sound, Emmerson also brought in English dance mixers for an electronic beat. "People thought I was mad when I touted the idea," Emmerson told Jim Carroll of The Irish Times. "At the time, I was out of favour with the London club scene. I was broke and on income support but the success was extraordinary".

=== Career ===
Jamming in the studios at Real World, musician Peter Gabriel's recording facilities in Wiltshire, England, the group of musicians recorded the basis of their first album in one week. This album, Volume 1: Sound Magic, was released by Real World Records in 1996, and marked the debut of the Afro Celt Sound System.

"Prior to that first album being made, none of us knew if it would work," musician James McNally told Larry Katz of the Boston Herald. "We were strangers who didn't even speak the same language. But we were bowled over by this communication that took place beyond language." McNally, who grew up second-generation Irish in London, played whistles, keyboards, piano, bodhran, and bamboo flute.

Sound Magic has now sold over 300,000 copies. The band performed at festivals, raves, and dance clubs and regularly included two African musicians, Moussa Sissokho on talking drum and djembe and N'Faly Kouyate on vocals, kora and balafon.

Just as the second album was getting off the ground, one of the group's core musicians, 27-year-old keyboardist Jo Bruce, (son of Cream bass player Jack Bruce), died suddenly of an asthma attack. The band was devastated, and the album was put on hold. Sinéad O'Connor then collaborated with the band and helped them cope with their loss. "[O'Connor] blew into the studio on a windy November night and blew away again leaving us something incredibly emotional and powerful," McNally told Katz. "We had this track we didn't know what to do with. Sinéad scribbled a few lyrics and bang! She left us completely choked up." The band used the name of O'Connor's song, "Release", for the title of their album. Volume 2: Release was released in 1999, and by the spring of 2000 it had sold more than half a million copies worldwide. Release is also used as one of the GCSE music set works in the UK that students are required to study for their exam.

In 2000, the group was nominated for a Grammy Award in the Best World Music category. The band, composed at the time of eight members from six countries (the UK, Senegal, Guinea, Ireland, France and Kenya), took pride in its ability to bring people together through music. "We can communicate anywhere at any corner of the planet and feel that we're at home," McNally told Patrick MacDonald of The Seattle Times. "We're breaking down categories of world music and rock music and black music. We leave a door open to communicate with each other's traditions. And it's changed our lives".

In 2001, the group released Volume 3: Further in Time, which climbed to number one on Billboard's Top World Music Albums chart. Featuring guest spots by Peter Gabriel and Robert Plant, the album also incorporated a heightened African sound. "On the first two records, the pendulum swung more toward the Celtic, London club side of the equation," Emmerson told The Irish Times' Carroll. "For this one, we wanted to have more African vocals and input than we'd done before." Again the Afro Celt Sound System met with success. Chuck Taylor of Billboard praised the album as "a cultural phenomenon that bursts past the traditional boundaries of contemporary music." The single "When You're Falling", with vocals by Gabriel, became a radio hit in the United States.

In 2003, for the Seed album, they changed their name to Afrocelts. They reverted to the longer band name for their subsequent albums, Pod, a compilation of new mixes of songs from the first four albums, Volume 5: Anatomic (their fifth studio album), and Capture (1995–2010).

They played a number of shows to promote Volume 5: Anatomic in 2006 and summer 2007, ending with a gig in Korea, before taking an extended break to work on side projects, amongst them The Imagined Village featuring Simon Emmerson and Johnny Kalsi. Starting in the summer of 2010, the band performed a series of live shows to promote Capture (1995–2010), released on 6 September 2010 on Real World Records. Further performances continue to the present day, and a new album-in-progress titled Born was announced on their website in 2014. Following the split (see below), Emmerson's version of the band released the album The Source in 2016.

Simon Emmerson died in March 2023. In late 2024, it was announced that Johnny Kalsi had left the band. In December 2024, the band stated on their Facebook page that henceforth they would be known as Afro-Bard Electronic.

=== Split ===
During 2015, the band had split into two formations, one of them including Simon Emmerson, N'Faly Kouyate and Johnny Kalsi, the other featuring James McNally and Martin Russell. The split was announced on the band's website in January 2016. The dispute officially ended with an announcement on social media on 21 December 2016.

Simon Emmerson, James McNally and Martin Russell are pleased to announce that they have been able to set aside their differences and come to an amicable agreement to bring their dispute to an end. Going forward, McNally, Russell and Emmerson have agreed that Emmerson will continue to perform as Afro Celt Sound System and McNally and Russell will work under a new name to be announced in due course. While McNally, Russell and Emmerson will no longer be performing or working together they recognise, and are grateful for each other's contribution to Afro Celt Sound System over the past two decades and will be working with the extensive community of musicians that make up the long standing Afro Celt Sound System family.

== Members ==
When Afro Celt Sound System formed in the mid-1990s during the Real World Recording Week, the difference between a guest artist and a band member was virtually non-existent. However, over time, a combination of people became most often associated with the name Afro Celt Sound System (while Volume 5: Anatomic only lists Emmerson, McNally, Ó Lionáird and Russell as regulars). The divided grouping of the band into two versions, both operating under the name Afro Celt Sound System, began in January 2016 and was resolved in December 2016 after McNally and Russell agreed to work under a different name from Emmerson.

- Simon Emmerson who died on 13 March 2023.
- N'Faly Kouyate
- Johnny Kalsi
- Moussa Sissokho
- Griogair Labhruidh
- Ronan Browne
- Emer Mayock
- Davy Spillane

Russell/McNally version

- Martin Russell
- James McNally
- Ian Markin
- Tim Bradshaw
- Babara Bangoura
- Dorothee Munyaneza
- Kadially Kouyaté
- Dav Daheley

Other musicians who have performed or recorded with Afro Celt Sound System include: Jimmy Mahon, Demba Barry, Babara Bangoura, Iarla Ó Lionáird, Peter Gabriel, Robert Plant, Pete Lockett, Sinéad O'Connor, Pina Kollar, Dorothee Munyaneza, Sevara Nazarkhan, Simon Massey, Jesse Cook, Martin Hayes, Eileen Ivers, Mundy, Mairéad Ní Mhaonaigh and Ciarán Tourish of Altan, Ronan Browne, Michael McGoldrick, Steáfán Hannigan, Myrdhin, Shooglenifty, Mairead Nesbitt, Nigel Eaton, Davy Spillane, Jonas Bruce, Heather Nova, Julie Murphy, Ayub Ogada, Caroline Lavelle, Ross Ainslie, Ged Lynch and Robbie Harris

== Discography ==
=== Studio albums ===
List of studio albums, with selected chart positions
Title	Year	Peak chart positions						
Title	Year	UK	AUS	FRA	IRE	NZ	US	US World
Volume 1: Sound Magic	1996	59	53	—	—	32	—	15
Volume 2: Release	1999	38	93	63	—	42	—	6
Volume 3: Further in Time	2001	77	—	—	33	—	176	1
Seed	2003	—	—	—	—	—	—	5
Volume 5: Anatomic	2005	—	—	—	—	—	—	—
The Source	2016	86	—	—	—	—	—	—
Flight	2018	—	—	—	—	—	—	—
OVA	2024	—	—	—	—	—	—	—

=== Other albums ===
- Pod (remix album) (2004)
- Capture (1995–2010) (2010) (compilation) No. 14 NZ

They also recorded the soundtrack for the PC game Magic and Mayhem, released in 1998.

=== Singles ===
List of commercial singles, with selected chart positions
Title	Year	Peak chart positions			Album
Title	Year	UK	NLD	US Dance	Album
"Sure-As-Not"	1996	—	—	—	Volume 1: Sound Magic
"Whirl-Y-Reel"	1997	91	—	—	Volume 1: Sound Magic
"Release" (featuring Sinéad O'Connor)	2000	71	—	3	Volume 2: Release
"When You're Falling" (featuring Peter Gabriel)	2001	139	86	—	Volume 3: Further in Time
