= N'Faly Kouyate =

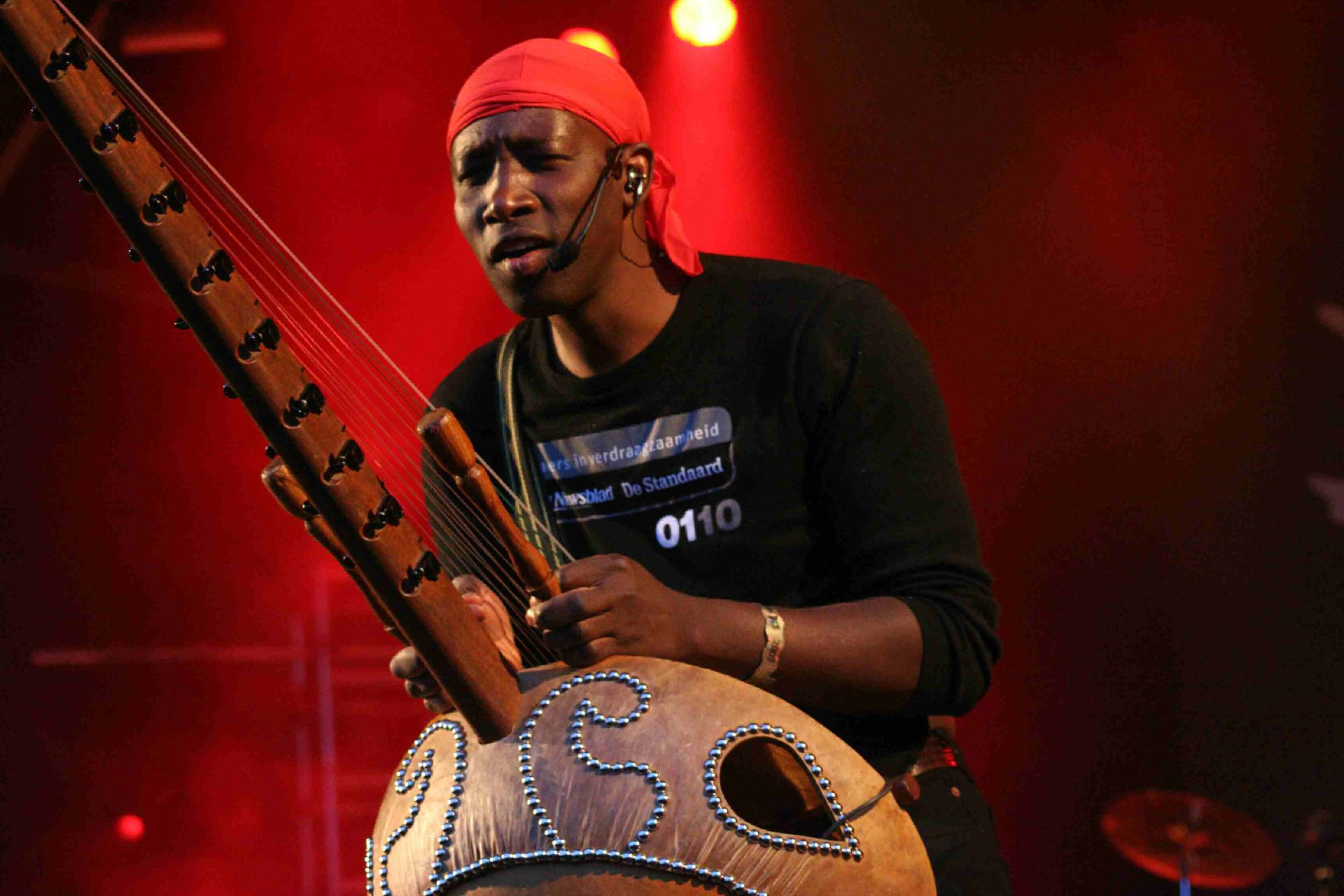
- Kouyate playing the kora with the Afro Celt Sound System, August 2007

Background information
- Origin: Siguiri, Guinea
- Occupation(s): Musician, songwriter
- Instrument(s): Vocals, kora, balafon
- Years active: 1994–present
- Website: https://nfaly.com

N'Faly Kouyate is a Guinean musician. He is a member of the Mandinka ethnic group of West Africa. His father was the griot Konkoba Kabinet Kouyate, who lived in Siguiri, Guinea.

In 1994 Kouyate moved to Belgium and formed the ensemble Dunyakan (The Voice of the World). In 1997, he was invited to join the Afro Celt Sound System providing vocals, playing the kora, and balafon, collaborating with the others in the band to compose songs that blended music from Ireland with that of West African countries including his native Guinea.

== See also ==
- Kora (instrument)
