= Real World Records =

British record label specializing in world music, founded in 1989 by Peter Gabriel

- Founded: 1989
- Founder: Peter Gabriel
- Distributors: Virgin Music Group; Yerba Buena; Narada Productions; Republic Records; EMI Records; Alternative Distribution Alliance
- Genre: World music, Progressive rock
- Country of origin: United Kingdom
- Location: Box Mill, Mill Lane, Box, Wiltshire SN13 8PL
- Official website: realworldrecords.com

Real World Records is a British record label specializing in world music. It was founded in 1989 by English musician Peter Gabriel and original members of WOMAD. A majority of the works released on Real World Records feature music recorded at Real World Studios, in Box, Wiltshire, England.

== History ==
Real World Records was created as a joint venture between Gabriel and WOMAD in 1989. The goal of its founding was to give musicians from around the world access to state-of-the-art recording facilities and audiences beyond their geographic region. The musical relationships formed at WOMAD festivals were also intended to lead to new music recordings. The first five albums published by Real World Records were La Explosion Dl Momento, Shahen-Shah, Babeti Soukous, Passion, and Passion – Sources.

In 1999, the label had sold over 3 million records worldwide and released 90 albums. In 2015, it had reached the mark of over 200 albums.

Many of the released recordings continue to be made at Real World Studios, also founded in 1989, whose facilities support the goals of Real World Records.

In 2011, EMI Music Publishing renewed the distribution deal for the Real World catalogue outside of the United Kingdom, thereby also covering the United States for the first time.

== Artists ==
- Afro Celt Sound System
- Ashkhabad
- Ayub Ogada
- Bernard Kabanda
- Blind Boys of Alabama
- Charlie Winston
- Creole Choir of Cuba
- Dengue Fever
- Fabiano do Nascimento
- Farafina
- Fatala
- Geoffrey Oryema
- Guo Brothers
- Hassan Hakmoun
- Hoba Hoba Spirit
- Jasdeep Singh Degun
- Johnny Kalsi
- Joi
- Joseph Arthur
- Les Amazones d'Afrique
- Little Axe
- Mamer
- Maryam Mursal
- Nusrat Fateh Ali Khan
- Ozomatli
- Paban Das Baul
- Pan-African Orchestra
- Papa Wemba
- Peter Gabriel
- Portico Quartet
- Rossy
- Rupert Hine
- Samuel Yirga
- Sheila Chandra
- Sevara Nazarkhan
- Spiro
- The Imagined Village
- U. Srinivas
- Värttinä
- Yungchen Lhamo
- The Zawose Queens

== Partial discography ==
- ABoneCroneDrone, Sheila Chandra, 1996
- Among Brothers, Abderrahmane Abdelli, 2003
- And I'll Scratch Yours, various artists, 2013
- Atom Bomb, The Blind Boys of Alabama, 2005
- Beat the Border, Geoffrey Oryema, 1993
- Big Blue Ball, various artists, 2008 (recorded 1991, 1992, 1995)
- Big City Secrets, Joseph Arthur, 1997
- Black Rock, Djivan Gasparyan & Michael Brook, 1998
- Coming Home, Yungchen Lhamo, 1998
- Djabote, Doudou Ndiaye Rose, 1992
- Emotion, Papa Wemba, 1995
- En Mana Kuoyo, Ayub Ogada, 1993
- Espace, Tama, 2002
- Go Tell It on the Mountain, Blind Boys of Alabama, 2003
- Higher Ground, The Blind Boys of Alabama, with Robert Randolph and the Family Band, and special guest Ben Harper, 2002
- In Your Hands, Charlie Winston, 2009
- Le Voyageur, Papa Wemba
- My Songs and a Poem, Estrella Morente, 2001
- Mustt Mustt, Nusrat Fateh Ali Khan & Michael Brook, 1990
- New Blood, Peter Gabriel, 2011
- Night Song, Nusrat Fateh Ali Khan & Michael Brook, 1995
- Night to Night, Geoffrey Oryema, 1996
- Passion: Music for The Last Temptation of Christ, Peter Gabriel, 1989
- Pod, Afro Celt Sound System, 2004
- Plus from US, various artists, 1993
- Quick Look, Pina, 2002
- Rama Sreerama, U. Srinivas, 1994
- Real Sugar, Paban Das Baul & Sam Mills, 1997
- Sampradaya, Pandit Shiv Kumar Sharma, with Rahul Sharma, Shafaat Ahmed Khan & Manorama Sharma, 1999
- Scratch My Back, Peter Gabriel, 2010
- Serious Tam, Telek, 2000
- Sezoni, Mara! with Martenitsa Choir, 1999 (original release on Rufus Records, 1997)
- Songs for the Poor Man, Remmy Ongala, 1989
- The Journey, Maryam Mursal, 1998
- The Last Prophet, Nusrat Fateh Ali Khan & Party, 1994
- The Truth (Ny Marina), The Justin Vali Trio, 1995
- The Zen Kiss, Sheila Chandra, 1994
- Tibet, Tibet, Yungchen Lhamo, 1996
- Trance, Hassan Hakmoun and Zahar, 1993
- Untold Things, Jocelyn Pook, 2001
- Up, Peter Gabriel, 2002
- Us, Peter Gabriel, 1992
- Volume 2: Release, Afro Celt Sound System, 1999
- Volume 3: Further in Time, Afro Celt Sound System, 2001
- Weaving My Ancestor's Voices Sheila Chandra, 1992
- Yo‘l Bo‘lsin, Sevara Nazarkhan, 2003
