= Ethnic electronica =

Broad category of electronic music

- Stylistic origins: World music; electronic music; electronica; new age music
- Cultural origins: 1980s, worldwide

Other topics
- Afro tech; Afrobeats; Asian underground; Azonto; Bachatón; Coupé-décalé; Funk carioca; Gqom; Kidandali; Kuduro; Kwaito; Mahraganat; Manila sound; Nortec; Psybient; Rabòday; Rara tech; Sambass; Shamstep; Shangaan electro; Trival; Worldbeat

Ethnic electronica (also known as ethnotronica, ethno electronica or ethno techno) is a broad category of electronic music, where artists combine elements of various styles of electronic music, world music and new age music. The music is primarily rooted in local music traditions and regional cultures, and can often engage in elements of popular music.

== History ==
In the Western Balkans, a Southern European subgenre of contemporary pop music known as "turbo-folk" (sometimes referred to as "popular folk") initially developed during the 1980s and 1990s, with similar music styles in Greece (Skyladiko), Bulgaria (Chalga), Romania (Manele) and Albania (Tallava). It's a fusion genre of popular music blending Serbian folk music with other genres such as pop, rock, electronic, and/or hip-hop.

Other notable examples of 1980s ethnic electronica include Angolan kuduro, Mexican tecnocumbia and the Indian album Synthesizing: Ten Ragas to a Disco Beat.

In the late 2010s, the Ukrainian ethnotronica scene had a rise, when such artists as Go_A, Onuka, Yuko, Mavka became popular outside their country.

== Notable artists ==
Notable acts of ethnic electronica include Bryn Jones with his project Muslimgauze, the artists of the Asian underground movement—such as Talvin Singh, Nitin Sawhney, Cheb i Sabbah, Asian Dub Foundation, State of Bengal, Transglobal Underground Joi and Natacha Atlas, Mozani Ramzan, Shpongle, Ott, Zavoloka, Linda George, Ikarus, Banco de Gaia, AeTopus, Zingaia, Afro-Celt Sound System, Métisse, The Halluci Nation, early work by Yat-Kha (with Ivan Sokolovsky).
