= Simon Emmerson =

English musician (1956–2023)

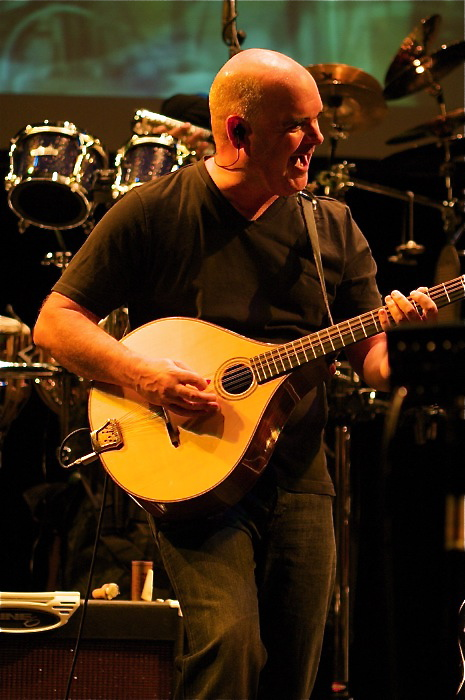
- Emmerson performing in 2008

Background information
- Also known as: Simon Booth
- Born: 12 March 1956; London, England
- Died: 13 March 2023 (aged 67)
- Genres: world music; Soul jazz
- Occupations: Musician; DJ; producer
- Instruments: guitar; Irish bouzouki; cittern; turntable
- Years active: 1978–2023
- Formerly of: Weekend; Working Week; Afro Celt Sound System

Simon Emmerson (12 March 1956 – 13 March 2023) was an English musician and record producer. He played in the bands Working Week, Weekend, and founded Afro Celt Sound System.

== Early life and education ==
Simon was born in London, the son of Alan Emmerson, an architect who had also worked as manager for the rock band Screw, and his wife, Mercia (née Samson), a sociology lecturer. He attended Ibstock Place School and then Wandsworth School. He attended Forest School Camps, in which his father was heavily involved, and there he developed his love of folk song, nature and bird watching.

== Career ==
=== Weekend ===
Emmerson played in Weekend in 1981 with Alison Statton, under the pseudonym Simon Booth. Around this time he also played guitar on Everything but the Girl's debut album Eden.

=== Working Week ===
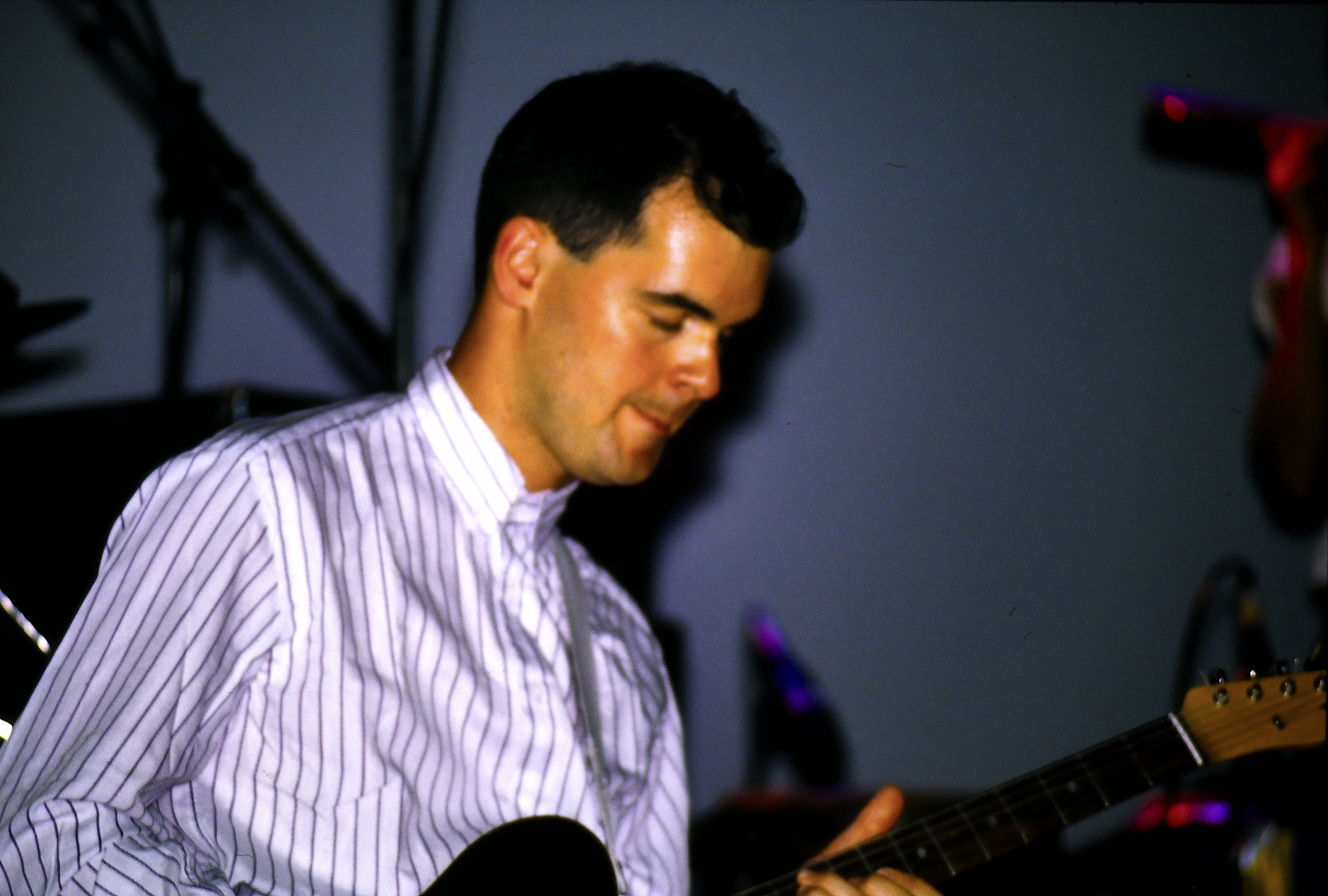
Simon Booth in Working Week, 1985

Emmerson played in Working Week with saxophone player Larry Stabbins in 1983. The band would release five albums before disbanding in 1991.

Emmerson began to work as a producer around this time, earning credits on an album by Manu Dibango.

=== Afro Celt Sound System ===
Emmerson formed the Afro Celt Sound System following a session at Real World Studios in 1995. In the same year Emmerson was nominated for a Grammy for his production work on Baaba Maal's album Firin' in Fouta.

Among other things, he collaborated on the OVO soundtrack by Peter Gabriel for the Millennium Dome Show of 2000.

=== The Imagined Village ===
Emmerson was also the main organiser of The Imagined Village, a collaborative work from many roots artists. Emmerson also played on this album.

=== Musical Director at Lush ===
Emmerson joined Lush Cosmetics as musical director in 2008, composing soundtracks to some of their spa experiences.

He formed a record company Emmerson Corncrake and Constantine with its founder, Mark Constantine.

== Personal life and death ==
Emmerson was a keen bird watcher and a druid. He lived in Broadwindsor.

Emmerson died on 13 March 2023, at the age of 67.

== Discography ==
=== Afro Celt Sound System ===
- See Afro Celt Sound System

=== Production credits ===
- Firin' in Fouta - Baaba Maal (1994)
- Witness - Show of Hands (2006)
- The Imagined Village - Various (Real World Records 2007)

=== Obituary by Peter Gabriel ===
- Peter Gabriel, Real World Records (17 March 2023). "Simon Emmerson (1956–2023)". realworldrecords.com.
