= CAS (album) =

Studio album by Lúnasa
- Released: June 8, 2018
- Studios: Deer Park Studios, Rathcoole; Dreamland Recording Studios; Marguerite Studios, Dublin; The Butcher Shoppe Studio
- Genre: Celtic
- Label: Lúnasa Records
- Producer: Lúnasa

Lúnasa chronology
Lúnasa with the RTÉ Concert Orchestra (2013)	CAS (2018)	Live in Kyoto (2024)

Professional ratings
Review scores
Source	Rating
Boston Irish	(favourable)
Living Tradition	(favourable)
Songlines	(favourable)

CAS is an album by Lúnasa. It was released in 2018, and is the band's eighth studio album. The album's name means "turn" in Irish.

In a departure from previous albums, CAS includes five guest vocalists: Natalie Merchant, Daoirí Farrell, Tim O'Brien, Eric Bibb, and Mary Chapin Carpenter.

== Track listing ==
1. The Tinker's Frolics (Bob's Hole in One, Cat On The Mushrooms, Headford Junction, Tinker's Frolics)
2. Sinéad Máire's (Sinéad Máire's, Nina's Jig, Eimear's Shuffle)
3. The Water is Wise (feat. Tim O'Brien)
4. The Bonny Light Horseman (feat. Natalie Merchant)
5. Pontivy (Péh Trouz Zou Ar En Doar, Sant Hern, An Dro For Kevin)
6. Paddy's Green Shamrock Shore (feat. Daoirí Farrell)
7. The Dregs of Birch
8. The Cadgers (Night in Nanchang, The Cadgers Reel, The Border Reel)
9. The Irish Girl (feat. Mary Chapin Carpenter)
10. Tribute to Larry (Scottish March, A Tribute to Larry Reynolds, The Tattie Bell)
11. My Lord What a Morning (feat. Eric Bibb)
12. Within a Mile (The Chestnut Tree, Willie's Fling No. 2, Within a Mile of Dublin, Cnocán an Teampaill)

== Personnel ==
Lúnasa

- Trevor Hutchinson – double bass, bouzouki, lap steel guitar
- Seán Smyth – fiddle
- Colin Farrell – fiddle, whistles
- Kevin Crawford – flute, whistles
- Ed Boyd – guitar
- Cillian Vallely - uilleann pipes, low whistle

Additional Personnel

- Patrick Doocey – guitar on tracks 2, 8 and 12
- John Fabricius – backing vocals on track 3
- Tim O'Brien – vocals on track 3
- Graham Henderson – keyboards on tracks 4, 6 and 9
- Natalie Merchant – vocals on track 4
- Daoirí Farrell – vocals and bouzouki on track 6
- Mary Chapin Carpenter – vocals on track 9
- Leon Hunt – banjo on track 10
- Ulrika Bibb – backing vocals on track 11
- Eric Bibb - vocals on track 11
