= Lúnasa with the RTÉ Concert Orchestra =

Live album by Lúnasa with the RTÉ Concert Orchestra
- Released: 16 April 2013
- Recorded: 2012
- Genre: Celtic fusion; classical crossover
- Length: 51:36
- Label: Lúnasa Records

Lúnasa chronology
Lá Nua (2010)	Lúnasa with the RTÉ Concert Orchestra (2013)	CAS (2018)

Lúnasa with the RTÉ Concert Orchestra is a collaboration album between Irish traditional Celtic music band Lúnasa and the Irish RTÉ Concert Orchestra, recorded in 2012 and released in April 2013 by Lúnasa Records. The collaboration came about after RTÉ contacted contemporary Irish composer Niall Vallely, requesting he composed music for a traditional group, and Vallely in turn requested Lúnasa for a collaboration, bringing the two ensembles together for a fusion between traditional and classical music. After the two groups performed at the National Concert Hall, Dublin, in April 2012, they recorded the album later in the year.

The music on the album is Vallely's rearrangement of various suites and tunes, both traditional and modern, that Lúnasa had performed in the past. Music critics have noted the dynamic of the album, where neither the orchestral and traditional elements of the recording outweigh each other. Lúnasa member Trevor Hutchinson is said to pivot the two genres together with his double bass playing. The album was well received by music critics, with journalists complimenting the spirit and fusion of the music. The collaboration allowed Lúnasa to reuse music that they had tired years before the recording of the album. In promotion of the album, Lúnasa toured in the United States and United Kingdom, as well as undergoing a major venue tour.

== Background and recording ==
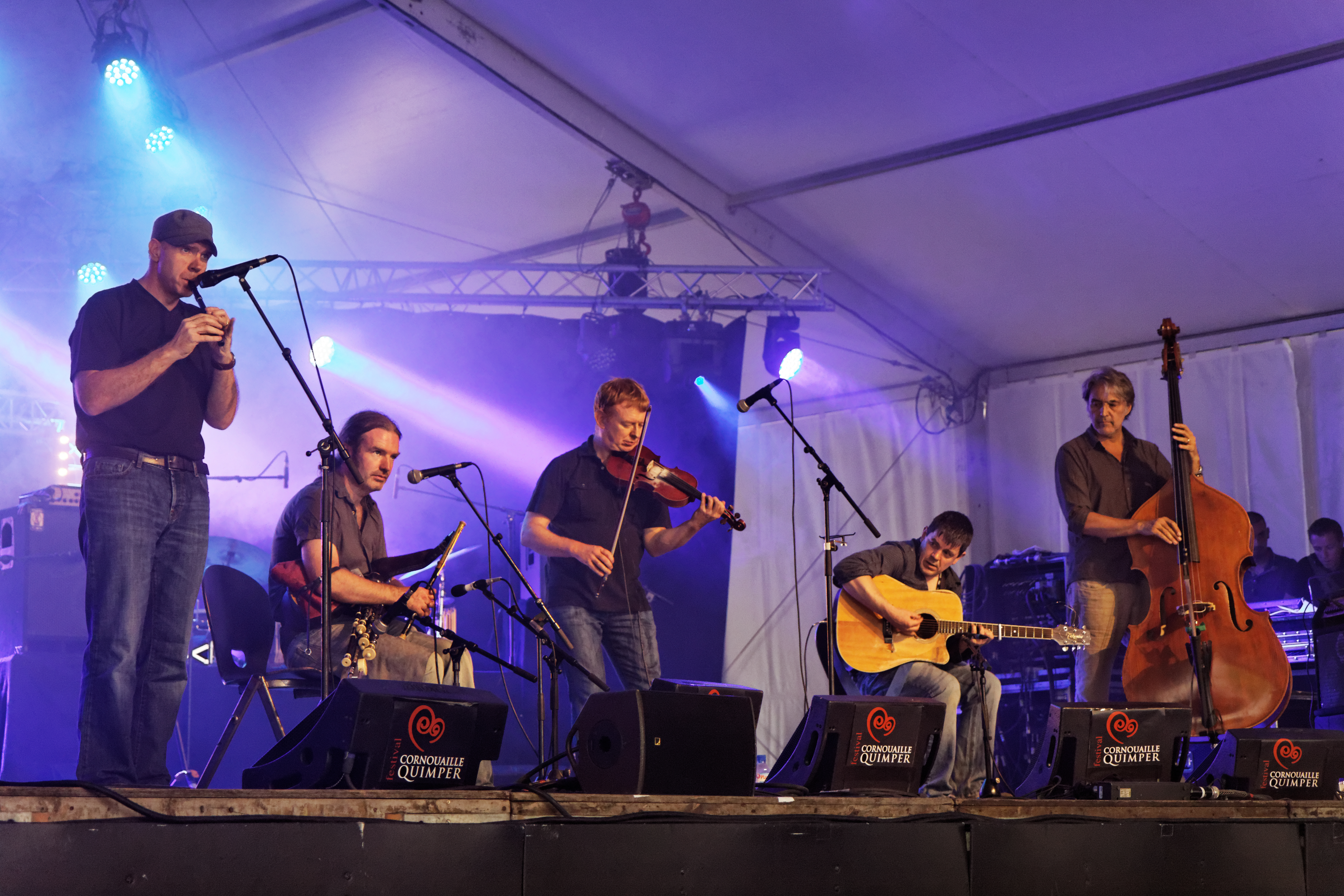
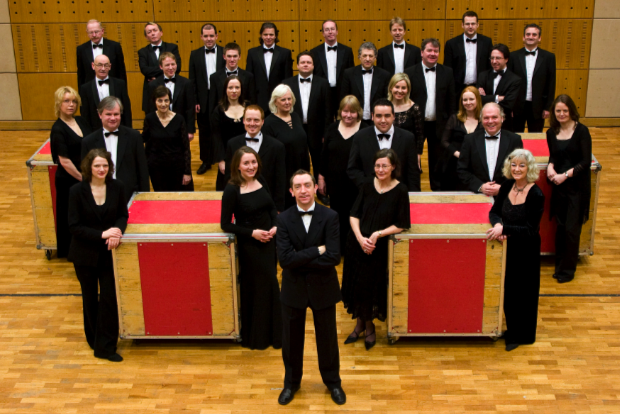
Lúnasa (top, pictured 2013) and the RTÉ Concert Orchestra (bottom, pictured 2009)

The genesis for the collaboration between Lúnasa and the RTÉ Concert Orchestra came when contemporary Irish composer Niall Vallely was asked by Irish service broadcaster RTÉ to curate arrangements for usage in a traditional band. According to one biography, Vallely was "the perfect fit for this adventurous undertaking" due to having composed both traditional and classical compositions. Vallely suggested Celtic folk group Lúnasa, which features his brother Cillian Vallely on pipes, for the project, and the project subsequently evolved into Lúnasa playing with the RTÉ Concert Orchestra, conducted by David Brophy, creating an unusual fusion between traditional and classical music. One biography noted that the collaboration allowed Niall to expand Lúnasa's "innovative use of harmony and rhythm," taking advantage of the harmonic and rhythmic potential of "the full orchestral sound. The result is truly a new sound in Irish music."

The initial performance between the two ensembles was on 19 June 2012 at the National Concert Hall, Dublin, which was recorded and broadcast on RTÉ's leading national station RTÉ Radio 1. The concert, titled "Music, Movement and the Brain," was part of the sixteenth Movement Disorder Society congress and featured Niall's new arrangements of Lúnasa's music for the two ensembles to play together. Journal of Music described the concept of the performance as an "interesting departure in and of itself." Later in the year, the band followed the concert with the recording of the Lúnasa with the RTÉ Concert Orchestra album. According to the November 2013 issue of Folk World, the album was recorded at Dublin's RTÉ Studios.

Recording the album allowed Lúnasa to continue exploring "new directions in the world of Irish traditional music;" band member Kevin Crawford commented: "Thankfully, the huge melting pot of music that exists within the Irish tradition allows us to seek out exciting and unexplored melodies that work for a band like ourselves. This combined with the newer self composed pieces and strong belief in what we do help to keep both the band and the tradition very much alive and kicking."

== Composition ==
"There are times where you can pretty much just hear a single instrument, but dynamically it doesn't feel like a solo, more like a contribution to the greater whole, a contrast to a broader, and often smoother, sound when the arrangement calls for everyone to be playing."

— Neil King of Fatea Records

Lúnasa with the RTÉ Concert Orchestra features nine sets, "with traditional as well as modern tunes;" the pieces are Niall's rearrangements of sets originally played by Lúnasa alone. As is often the case with traditional Celtic folk albums, including previous Lúnasa albums, each track on the album "is compiled of several airs, jigs and reels." While Niall's arrangements are "grand and symphonic," they nonetheless "frame and support individual and group contributions from Lúnasa with a sure, often sublime touch." The plucked and bowed double bass of Lúnasa member Trevor Hutchinson serves as the "sonic and symbolic pivot between the two genres [classical and Irish folk]," while also expanding the depth and range "of the ensemble's sound." RJ Lannan of Zone Music Reporter said multiple genres are used on the album's reels, "namely Celtic, Irish, folk, and classical," and described the album's sound as "a balance of yesterday and today."

Several reviewers have said that the recording establishes an even balance between the traditional and orchestral instruments, rather than one element dominating the other; Tara Dougherty of Irish America said "the orchestra adds a gusto to the traditional songs that never overpowers Lúnasa's unique voice; rather, the arrangements seem dedicated only to enhancing it," while Caith Threefires of Bass Player said "it's as if the orchestra were led by the band on a stroll through the Emerald Isle countryside, rather than the band becoming a Celtic ornament in the concert hall." Reviewer Neil King felt that the music occasionally gets "competitive", meaning that "neither outfit ends up getting subsumed into the narrow world of the other, you can feel the way both units approach folk music, where they differ and where they compliment." Deanne Sole of PopMatters felt "both parties in this partnership respect one another’s roles—Lúnasa the folk band representing the value of small piercing personalities, the RTÉ Concert Orchestra representing the value of smooth mass group sound."

=== Sets ===
The traditional Asturian air "Casu", which originates from the Iberian part of Celtic lands, begins the album and "features flute and guitar with a resounding backup from the orchestra"; the piece was previously recorded by Lúnasa on their third album The Merry Sisters of Fate (2001). Three other sets on the album also appeared on The Merry Sisters of Fate, namely "The Minor Bee", "The Merry Sisters of Fate" and "Morning Nightcap." According to one critic, the influence that Cillian Valley had on Lord of the Dance is apparent on his dramatic "Leckan Mór". Described as "a perfect showcase for Cillian's fine piping," the poignant and melancholy "An Buachaillín Bán (With Scully's)" is an eleven-minute suite, which is brought "to a rhythmic and orchestral finale" by "Scully Casey's" and "The Dusty Miller."

"Morning Nightcap" is opened by Donald Shaw's "MacLeod's Farewell." PopMatters said: "The individual fiddle and pipe go skipping near the end of 'Morning Nightcap' and the cushion of strings rolls massively after them like a willing St Bernard." The "Breton Set", so named because it features Breton folk dance music, features "virtuoso flute playing" and "fine orchestral arrangements." "The Minor Bee" suite, which consists of the three pieces "Minor Slip", "Loudeac Ronde" and "The Red Bee," has been described as an "animated" trilogy. "The Merry Sisters of Fate" begins with a double bass and fiddle introduction by Hutchinson and Seán Smyth and proceeds into "a final musical firework with 3 traditional dance tunes."

== Release ==
On 30 January 2013, Lúnasa released a press release announcing the album. "Expect [the album] to reconfigure more than a few musical maps via the intersection between Irish music orchestral and Irish music traditional," the press release announced. The band's first album in three years, Lúnasa with the RTÉ Concert Orchestra was released digitally on 17 March 2013 to coincide with St. Patrick's Day, followed by a physical release in the United Kingdom and United States by Lúnasa Records on 16 April 2013. In the US, the album was distributed via City Hall Distributors. The CD features a bonus Enhanced CD element, featuring the music video of the performance of "Morning Nightcap" from the National Concert Hall performance.

A live film clip from the National Hall Performance, directed by award-winning director Myles O'Reilly, was produced by Lúnasa and released on 17 March 2013 to promote the album. Also to promote the album, Lúnasa began a month long tour of the US on 22 February, followed "by UK festival appearances and [a] major venue tour." Interviewed at the time of the album's release and subsequent touring, Seán Smyth said that "as for the future, there are many, many musical journeys left open to us. For now, we're going to savor the orchestral theme and look forward to recreating these wonderful arrangements in theatres and with audiences around the world."

== Critical reception ==
Professional ratings
Review scores
Source	Rating
AllMusic	3.5/5 stars
Bass Player	(favourable)
Bright Young Folk	(favourable)
Fatea	(favourable)
FolkWorld	(favourable)
Irish America	(favourable)
PopMatters	6/10
Songlines	(favourable)
Zone Music Reporter	5/5 stars

Lúnasa with the RTÉ Concert Orchestra was released to positive reviews from music critics. Tara Dougherty of Irish America said, "combining the lively thrill of Lúnasa with the awe-inspiring power of one of Ireland’s most celebrated orchestras results in a powerhouse record that will delight Lúnasa fans and entice classical fans into the world of Irish music." James Christopher Monger of AllMusic rated the album three and a half stars out of five and complimented the "stirring performances." Caith Threefires of Bass Player called it "a flawless and moving performance" and noted the album's "defining nuances" help it avoid becoming "subverted and washed out" because the "beautifully arranged" music is performed "as if the orchestra were led by the band on a stroll through the Emerald Isle countryside, rather than the band becoming a Celtic ornament in the concert hall." Michael Quinn of Songlines said "Vallely’s arrangements are grand and symphonic but they manage to frame and support individual and group contributions from Lunasa with a sure, often sublime touch."

R J Lannan, writing for Zone Music Reporter's "The Sounding Board" column, rated the album an "excellent" 5/5 rating and said: "The music is more than just a swaree. The pairing of a full-bodied orchestra and a band of talented traditionalists makes for some extraordinary entertainment." Neil King of Fatea Records said "this is one of the best folk and orchestra combinations I've heard and leave it at that, the arrangements are simply sublime." In issue 52 of Folkworld, the album was seen as the exemplifying the band's "musical horizon" being widened. More reserved in her praise, Deanne Sole of PopMatters rated the album 6/10, saying that although the album is not "brilliant", it is "talented."

== Legacy ==
Lúnasa's collaboration with the RTÉ Concert Orchestra allowed Lúnasa to reuse music that they had retired many years before. "A number of the pieces had been banished to the wilderness," explained Crawford, "destined never to see the light of a Lúnasa day ever again. Getting the opportunity to dust them down and hear them in a totally new environment gave the tunes a whole new lease of life and reawakened our love and respect for them. It's an experience I certainly never thought I'd encounter as a traditional Irish musician." According to Rob Adams of the Herald Scotland, the collaboration allowed Niall Vallely to discover Lúnasa's performance dynamic: "As [Niall Vallely] found when writing the score for their recent collaboration with the RTE Concert Orchestra, Lunasa makes a very complete sound in its own right without over-playing or driving the music too hard."

Lúnasa with the RTÉ Concert Orchestra has been described as "groundbreaking." While Deanne Sole of PopMatters compared it with the Indian and Western classical fusion album Samaagam (2011), a collaboration between Amjad Ali Khan and the Scottish Chamber Orchestra, the album was also described in 2014 by Ceili editor Chuck Bloom as the first of two recent Celtic CDs that "have brought symphony orchestras into the fold within the past year," the second being Live in Washington, D.C., a collaboration between American Rogues and the United States Air Force Symphony.

== Track listing ==
1. "Casu" – 5:13
2. "Leckan Mór" – 4:24
3. "Spoil The Dance" – 4:30
4. "An Buachaillín Bán (with Scully's)" – 11:18
5. "Morning Nightcap" – 4:19
6. "Breton Set (with Tro Breizh)" – 5:47
7. "The Minor Bee" – 5:57
8. " The Last Pint" – 4:20
9. "The Merry Sisters of Fate (with Dr. Gilbert's)" – 5:44

Bonus video

1. "Morning Nightcap" (live at the National Concert Hall, Dublin 19 June 2012) – 4:46

== Personnel ==
- Lúnasa – performers
- RTÉ Concert Orchestra – performers
- Niall Vallely – arrangements

== See also ==
- Lúnasa
- RTÉ Concert Orchestra
