= Otherworld (album) =

Studio album by Lúnasa
- Released: October 12, 1999
- Recorded: 1999
- Studios: Marguerite Studios, Dublin; Cuan A.V. Spiddal, Connemara
- Genres: Celtic; Celtic fusion
- Length: 42:24
- Label: Green Linnet
- Producer: Lúnasa

Lúnasa chronology
Lúnasa (1998)	Otherworld (1999)	The Merry Sisters of Fate (2001)

Otherworld is an album by Lúnasa that was released 1999 on Green Linnet Records. It is the band's second major release. Although the album displays the band’s traditional Celtic sound, it features techniques and styles unusual to the genre, such as occasional double-tracking recording and occasional instances of instruments that differ from Celtic music, such as cello, electric bass and flügelhorn, leading Allmusic to say the album "yields a sound that is unique to the group and yet clearly in touch with tradition". The album has been described as innovative, with The Georgia Straight citing several tracks' usage of multiple woodwinds as an example.

Their first album with Kevin Crawford, and for Green Linnet Records, the album was a major critical success, with critics complimenting the album's unusual sound. Their first album released outside of Ireland, it was also commercially successful for a small band, and became the fastest-selling album in the history of Green Linnet Records. American newspapers Irish Echo and Irish Voice both named the album "Traditional Album of the Year" in 1999.

== Background and recording ==
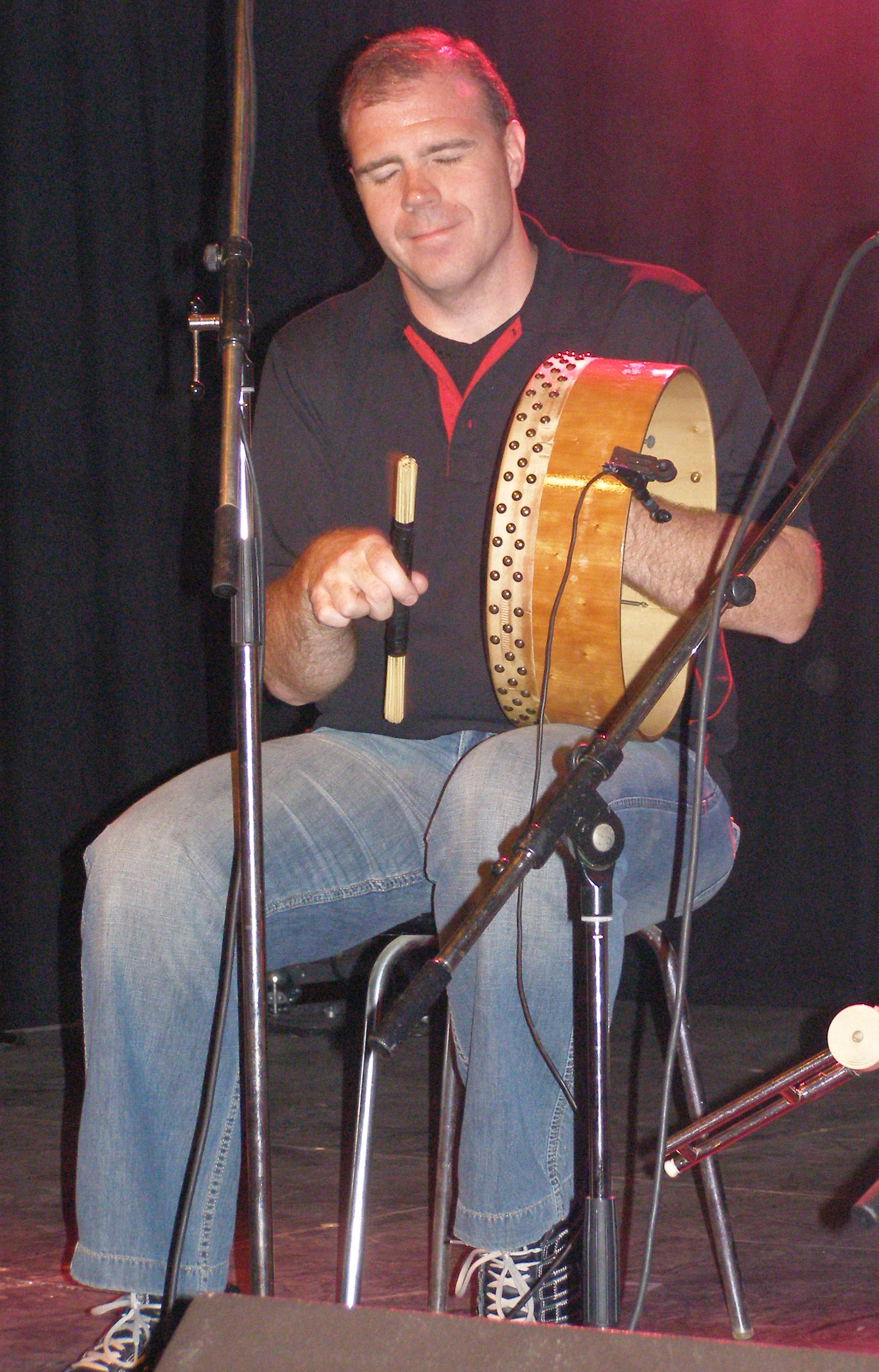
Otherworld is Kevin Crawford's first album with Lúnasa.

Lúnasa, who had formed in 1996 as a traditional Celtic music band, had built up a following 1997, selling out venues to "rapturous crowds." The eager, growing reputation of the band lead to them recording their debut album, Lúnasa, later in the year before its release on 16 January 1998. A self-released recording only initially released in Ireland, it was nonetheless popular with critics and the public, becoming a best-seller in Ireland and being named among Irish Echo's "Albums of the Year." The band toured worldwide throughout 1998 and underwent personnel changes; multi-instrumentalist Michael McGoldrick left the band on amicable terms, leading to their fiddle and whistle player Seán Smyth asking Kevin Crawford to join the band during the tour, replacing McGoldrick. Uilleann pipes player John McSherry also left the band who did not desire to tour.

It was during the tour that the band "really started to experiment"; the band's double bass player Trevor Hutchinson recalled that "it became obvious that we should give the band a serious go. I felt that there was enough momentum behind the band and goodwill from the audiences to give up the other work we were doing and concentrate entirely on Lúnasa." The success of their debut album and their touring led to the band signed a three-album contract to American independent Celtic music label Green Linnet Records in 1999, a label described by Lúnasa biographer Bran San Martin as "then one of the premier outlets for modern Celtic music." One commentary recalled that "the deal was the largest signing the label had ever offered a new band." The band's second album would be the first for the contract. Nonetheless, although McGoldrick and McSherry had left the band, they returned as guest musicians for the new album, sharing pipe duties.

The band self-produced the album and recorded it at Cuan A.V. Spiddal in Connemara and in Hutchinson's own Dublin studio complex, Marguerite Studios. Additional recording also took place with engineer work by Doug Briggs at The Cutting Rooms, Manchester, where Mike McGoldrick's flutes and pipes on two of the tracks were recorded. The album was engineered by Ed Kenehan, who also mixed the album with the band. Naming the album Otherworld, the band sought to experiment more than they had on their first album; Martin said the album "proved to be the band's biggest artistic challenge to date." The band underwent "a great deal of experimentation" as they searched for a way in which to "utilize the studio to focus their energies and bring out varying facets off their sound." The sessions had a bigger budget than the band's previous album, thus the band were "able to achieve greater production values, which went a long way to capturing the power of their live performances." The sessions incorporated techniques highly atypical to usual studio-recorded traditional music, such as multitrack recording, used often in instances of harmonization.

== Composition ==
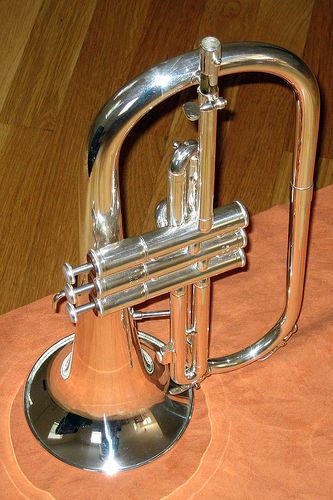
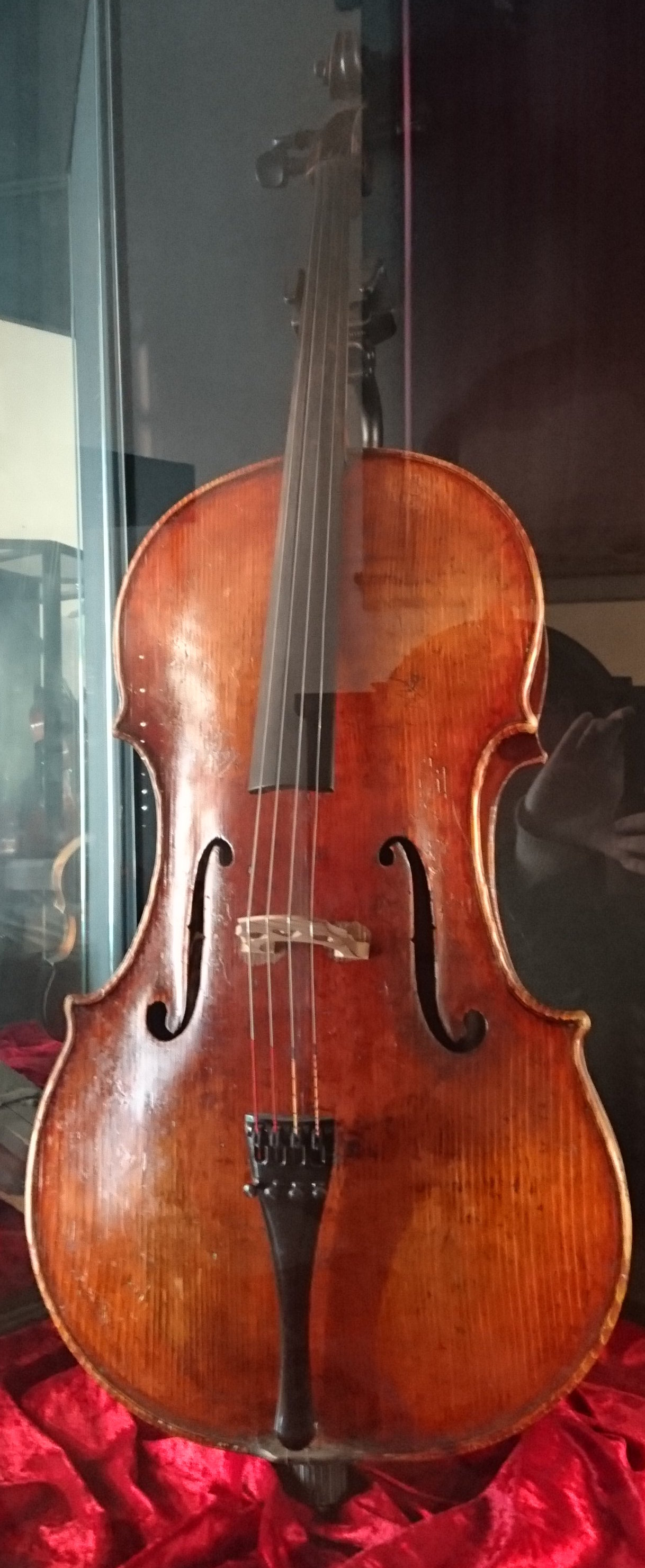
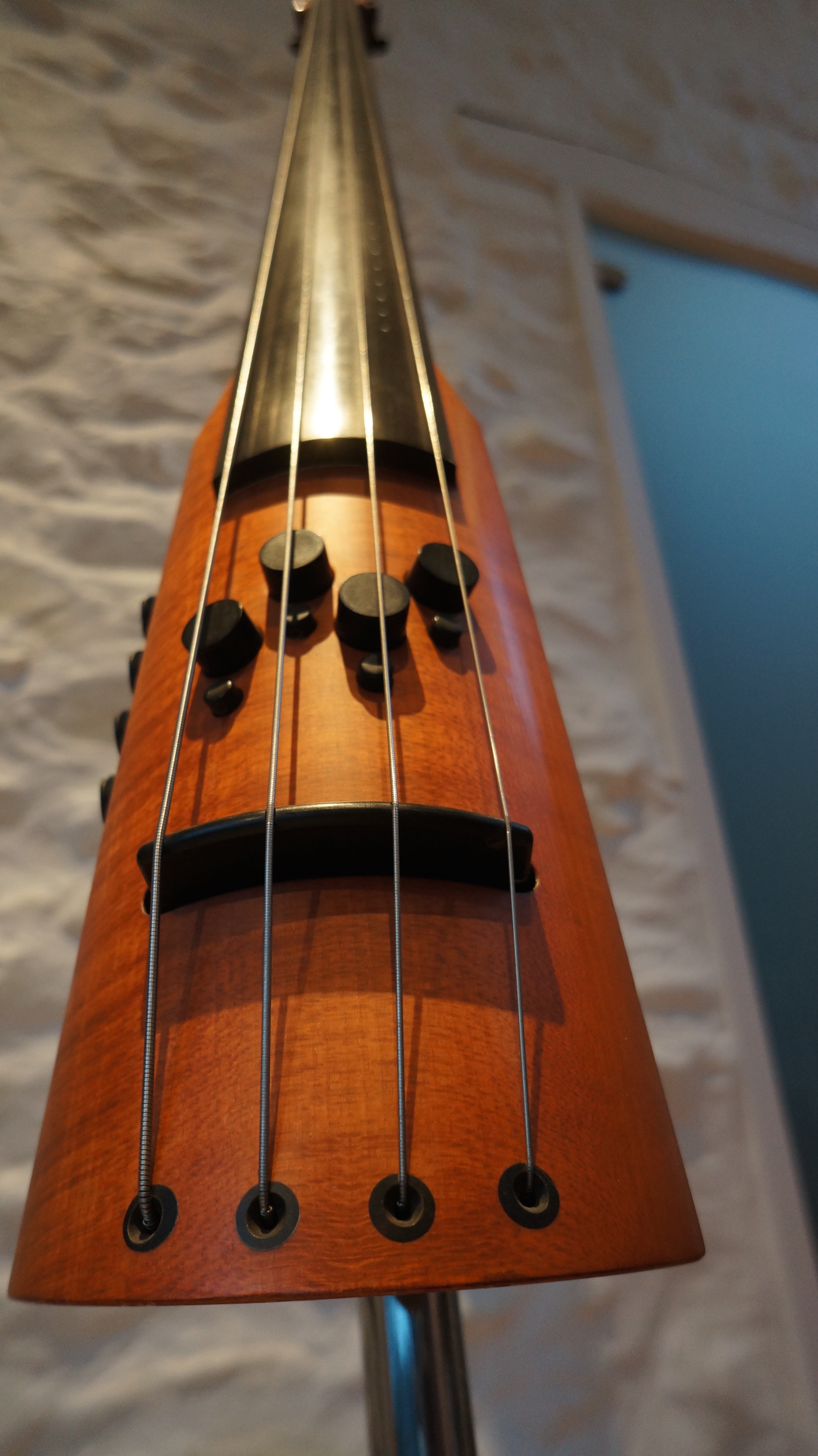
Otherworld features several instruments atypical to Celtic music such as the flugelhorn, cello and electric bass.

Otherworld features eleven tracks that mix traditional Irish folk pieces, original compositions and cover versions; the band's versions of the Irish folk tunes were described by one critic as "dazzling reworkings." Many of the pieces on the albums are reels but there are also multiple jigs and pieces, in addition to air and march compositions. Of the more traditional Celtic instruments used on Otherworld, several of the specific models used were promoted by the band in the liner notes. Fiddle player Seán Smyth played fiddle and viola created by Mick de Hoog and a low F whistle created by Mike Grunter, whose low whistles and flutes were also used by Kevin Crawford on the album, in addition to Alfonso bodhrans.

Stylistically, however, Otherworld is characterised by experimenting whilst at the same time staying true to traditional music, featuring a "front line of flute, pipes and fiddle" that is "propelled from the bottom" by Trevor Hutchinson's "driving" double bass work, an instrument rarely seen in Celtic music. As such, some critics noted a jazz influence; The Boston Herald described Otherworld as delivering "a jazz-like sense of swing and improvisation," whilst another critic described it as marrying "jazz rock bass lines and an expanded harmonic sensibility to an older rural music." Nonetheless, the band rejected the jazz comparisons, with the band's fiddle player Seán Smyth saying "we're always trying to blend the new and the old. [...] We don't do any jazz/blues revampings or anything like that, though we do blend in some new melodies and harmonies, and of course added the rhythm section."

Besides the double bass and jazzy sound, there are multiple other approaches on Otherworld unusual to Celtic music; the album's sound has been described as "rich and dense but still danceable" and features "occasional incursions" of other musical instruments unusual to Celtic music, such as the cello, flügelhorn and electric double bass. The band's approach to recording the album included multiple instances of double-tracking certain instruments, which lead one critic said "yields a sound that is unique to the group and yet clearly in touch with tradition." Several of the tracks on the album features multiple woodwinds, an approach described the most innovative of the album's multiple examples in its arrangements by Tony Montague of The Georgia Straight. One critic described the foregrounding on several tracks "of wind duos or trios - flute plus whistle and/or low whistle […] The subtle differences in tone between these superficially similar instruments are exploited in some beautiful arrangements. And the recording quality is superb throughout, allowing every performer to come through clearly." Mary Lamey of the Montreal Gazette described the playing on the album as "complex, multi-layered and unburdened by easy sentimentality."

=== Structure ===
The album opens with "Goodbye Miss Goodavich"/"Rosie's Reel", a set of reels which feature low whistles, followed by "The Floating Crowbar"/"McGlinchey's"/"The Almost Reel", a "hard-charging dance tune" that consists of reels and "deft, jazz-inspired flourishes." Mike Sutton of Musical Traditions, explaining the track's contrasts, said "the fiddle-pipes duet on 'The Floating Crowbar' [gives] way to a dazzling whistle lead (well supported by guitar, bass and bodhran) on 'McGlinchey's', before the pipes and fiddle return to enrich the mixture on 'The Almost Reel'." On the third track, "The Butlers of Glen Avenue"/"Sliabh Russell"/"Cathal McConnell's", Crawford, playing flute and whistle, and guest musician McGoldrick, playing low whistle and union pipes, are playing in harmony with each other whilst both being double-tracked. The first two jigs in the track, "The Butlers of Glen Avenue" (also known as "Roaring Bar Maid") and "Silabh Russell", are double jigs, featuring six notes per bar, whilst the final jig, "Cathal McConnell's", also known as "Cock and the Hen," is a slip jig.

"January Shows"/"Laura Lynn Cunningham" is a two-part set; the first part, "January Shows," is an air with guest pipe playing from John McSherry and whistle effects, whilst the second part, "Laura Lynn Cunningham", was written by Phil Cunningham. The track also features double-track recording. “The Miller of Drohan" is a slow reel which displays "a more ruminative, delicate side of their music-making, especially through Hutchinson’s playing of cello and bowed bass." Elsewhere on the album, the traditional "Lafferty's" featuring "bass, fiddle, flute, guitar, and pipes [building] a rumbling momentum as if," according to one critic, "determined to drag Irish folkmusic kicking and screaming into the 21st century," whilst "Stolen Apples" features a horn arrangement by Patrick Fitzpatrick. "Taylor Bar, 4am"/"Ceol na Mara" is one of the album's all-jig sets, again combining a double jig with a slip jig.

== Release ==
Otherworld was released on 12 October 1999 by Green Linnet Records as the band's first internationally-released album and first album on the label. Upon release, it became the fastest-selling album ever released on the label, which had been running for 25 years. The album cover of Otherworld, designed by Naoimh Ingram, was described by one critic as "an arty photo of light glancing off rippling water—the band's name in blurry cursive script—a mystical title." Without band consent, Green Linnet applied a sticker on American copies of the album quoting The Village Voice saying the band were "the hottest Irish acoustic group on the planet." The band were photographed by Adolpho Crespo for the liner notes. Unlike other albums by the band, the track names on Otherworld mention all the tunes featured in them, whereas other albums usually feature the names of only one.

The album was released during Lúnasa's 1999 tour of the United States; one commentary later stated that "whereas most groups will land 20 dates a year in North America, Lunasa regularly pull down 80–90. It's an old-fashioned style, but it works." The band ultimately toured worldwide in promotion of the album, "and even played to a sold-out crowd at the Hollywood Bowl in the summer of 2000." As much as two years after the album's release, the band's live sets were still equal on material from Otherworld with other albums.

== Reception ==
Professional ratings
Review scores
Source	Rating
Allmusic	link
Boston Herald	(favourable)
The Georgia Straight	(favourable)
Montreal Gazette	4/5 stars
The Washington Post	(favourable)

The album received unanimous praise from critics, who praised the liveliness, innovation and experimentation of the record. Rick Anderson of Allmusic, rating the album four and a half stars out of five, "highly recommended" the album and commented that the record's unusual harmonisation and recording approach contributed to "a very attractive sound." Geoffrey Himes of The Washington Post was favourable, calling it "impressive" and highlighting Hutchinson's contributions as key, saying "his vigorous bowing and plucking make the underlying rhythms in these jigs and reels more muscular and obvious than ever before." Comparing the band to Hutchinson's previous band, the Sharon Shannon Band, he described Otherworld as incorporating "that band's experiments in beefing up the bottom of Irish folk music" and taking them "a step further." fRoots said the album was an "awesome, scintillating concoction" that "sparkled with all the energy of Lúnasa’s live performances."

Tony Montague of The Georgia Straight said "Otherworld is as close to perfection as any recording of instrumental Celtic music I can recall, and there aren’t enough fresh superlatives to praise it adequately," calling the band's musicianship "flawless" and the tunes "excellent," adding "the arrangements are impressively innovative." Earlie Hitchner of The Irish Echo said the album was "even better" than their debut album, saying "every track is a keeper on this album, bursting with that altogether rareblend of intelligence, innovation, virtuosity, and passion," whilst Kevin B Convey of the Boston Herald said Otherworld justified the band's hype and compared the album to the Bothy Band, saying the band members' experience in previous bands "pays off in furious playing, fleet improvisations and fine arrangements." Also favourable in their opinion were Roots World who commented that "the band's attraction lies in the tight, inventive improvisation, the wide repertoire and the excellent playing of the four regulars."

Mary Lamey of the Montreal Gazette rated the album four stars out of five and called it "seriously beautiful music." Mike Sutton of Musical Traditions called the album "the genuine article": "The sound balance and arrangements may be studio-smooth, rather than bar-room rough, but these are musicians who know their stuff. They understand the tradition thoroughly, though they aren't afraid to experiment with ideas from outside it." Alex Monaghan of The Living Tradition was similarly favourable, saying that the album is "so full of power and passion that it is almost out of this world" and concluding that "highlights are impossible to pick, it's all consistently wonderful. In 42 minutes, Otherworld gives your brain and central nervous system a total work-out. The music cuts right through you, and leaves you refreshed and invigorated. If you could have supergroups with no singers, Lúnasa would be one. As it is, they're probably best described as a natural holistic tonic for tired ears and shallow lives. Objectivity goes out the window with these guys."

=== Accolades and legacy ===
"Their toil was a critical and commercial success, an album that firmly established Lúnasa as a force to be reckoned with."

— Bran San Martin (2008).

In 1999, American newspapers Irish Echo and Irish Voice both named the album "Traditional Album of the Year". The album was a major turning point in the band's career, bringing a higher level of critical and commercial triumph to the band and establishing them as, in the words of the band's biographer Bran San Martin, "a force to be reckoned with." Reflecting back on the album, Roots World said that the album was "a remarkable achievement [sic]. Traditional without being narrow-minded and innovative without being avant-garde, you don't so much listen to the songs as you absorb them." One biography recalled how the album "was hailed as one of the most refreshing recordings of Irish music in years." Another said the album "strengthened the group's reputation as one of the Celtic music scene's hottest young bands." Mojo magazine described it as a "benchmark album." Chris Nickson of Allmusic described the album's innovations and importance on the band's career:

"It was in 1999 that the band really achieved their breakthrough in Celtic circles with Otherworld, recorded for Green Linnet. With a bigger budget, they were able to achieve greater production values, which went a long way to capturing the power of their live performances, with "The Butlers of Glen Avenue/Sliabh Russell/Cathal McConnell's" being a true standout. McGoldrick made a guest appearance, and there was even that traditional Irish instrument, the flügelhorn, in there somewhere. Pushing the envelope on the music, they weren't content to simply play the tunes, but added real live grooves to the music and took it into other areas. This helped bring in plenty more friends when they toured through much of 2000, hitting even more parts of the globe and acquiring an even more glittering reputation."

Referring to the album's critical acclaim, Smyth said "it's always a thrill to have created something that's been so well-received." Crawford later said it was his favourite album that the band had recorded, alongside Sé (2006). On the band's "best of" album The Story So Far (2008), three tracks from Otherworld are included: "The Miller of Drohan", "The Floating Crowbar" and "O'Carolan's Welcome/Rolling in the Barrel." "Autumn Child/Heaton Chapel" also featured on Green Linnet's anniversary compilation Green Linnet Records: 25 Years of Celtic Music (2001). The sheet music to all the tracks from Otherworld were published in Donogh Hennessy's music book Lúnasa: The Music 1996–2001 (2002).

== Track listing ==
The list below is of track titles as printed in the CD package. For identifications of the tunes on this album in the context of the traditional Irish repertoire, see the track listing at irishtune.info.

1. Goodbye Miss Goodavich / Rosie's Reel
2. The Floating Crowbar / McGlinchey's / The Almost Reel
3. The Butlers of Glen Avenue / Sliabh Russell / Cathal McConnell's
4. January Snows / Laura Lynn Cunningham
5. The Miller of Drohan
6. Dr. Gilbert / Devils of Dublin / Black Pat's
7. Autumn Child / Heaton Chapel
8. Stolen Apples
9. Taylor Bar, 4am / Ceol Na Mara
10. Lafferty's / Crock of Gold / Lady Birr / Abbey Reel
11. O'Carolan's Welcome / Rolling in the Barrel
