= Cillian Vallely =

Irish musician

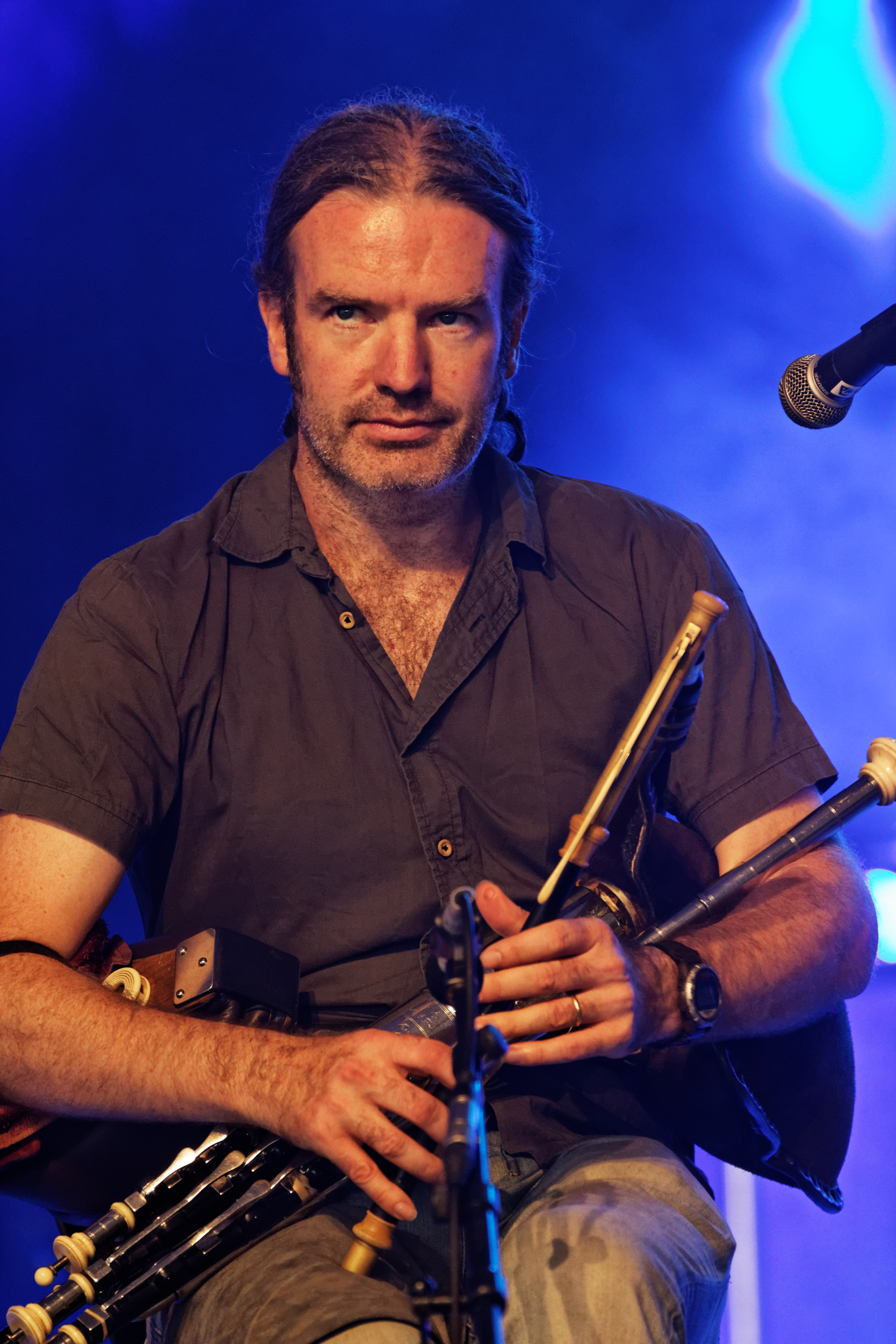
- Cillian playing the Uilleann Pipes during a Lúnasa concert

Background information
- Genres: Irish traditional
- Instruments: Uilleann pipes, flutes, tin whistles
- Website: http://www.cillianvallely.com

Cillian Vallely is an Irish musician, born in Armagh, Northern Ireland. He plays traditional Irish music on the uilleann pipes and low whistle, and studied at the Armagh Pipers Club with his mother and father, Brian and Eithne, and then with the late Armagh piper Mark Donnelly. His brothers, Niall and Caoimhín, also play traditional music.

Since 1999, he has been a member of the band Lúnasa with whom he has recorded seven albums. He has also performed and toured with Riverdance, Natalie Merchant, Tim O'Brien & Mary Chapin-Carpenter in The Crossing, New York-based Whirligig, and the Celtic Jazz Collective with Lewis Nash and Peter Washington. In the past couple of years, he has worked on various collaborations between traditional and classical music, along with his brother Niall and the composer Micheal O’Suilleabhain.

He has recorded on over 40 albums including Callan Bridge with his brother Niall, On Common Ground with Kevin Crawford and various guest spots with Natalie Merchant, Alan Simon’s Excalibur project with Fairport Convention and Moody Blues, GAIA with the Prague Philharmonic Orchestra, and singer Karan Casey. He has recently recorded on two movie soundtracks, Irish Jam and The Golden Boys and played uilleann pipes on the BBC’s Flight of the Earls soundtrack. In January 2014, he played uilleann pipes, low whistle and tin whistle on the Bruce Springsteen album High Hopes, which topped the charts in 14 countries.

== Discography ==
Solo

- Raven's Rock (BallyO Records, 2016)

With Lúnasa

- The Merry Sisters of Fate (Green Linnet, 2001)
- Redwood (Green Linnet, 2003)
- The Kinnitty Sessions (Compass Records, 2004)
- Sé (Compass Records, 2006)
- The Story So Far... (Compass Records, 2008)
- Lá Nua (Lúnasa Records, 2010)
- Lúnasa with the RTÉ Concert Orchestra (Lúnasa Records, 2013)

With others

- Aine Minogue: To Warm the Winter's Night (Evergreen, 1996)
- John Whelan: Come to Dance (Narada, 1999)
- Susan McKeown, Cathie Ryan, & Robin Spielberg: Mother (North Star, 1999)
- Druidstone: The Vow (North Star, 1999)
- Whirligig: Spin (One-Eight Hundred, 2000)
- Susan McKeown: Lowlands (Green Linnet, 2000)
- Niall & Cillian Vallely: Callan Bridge (Crow Valley Music, 2002)
- Live From The Katharine Cornell Theater: Traditional Irish Music (KCT Concerts, 2002)
- Karan Casey: Distant Shore (Shanachie Records, 2003)
- Alan Simon: GAIA (BMI, 2003)
- Live Recordings from the William Kennedy Piping Festival (Armagh Pipers Club, 2003)
- Patrick Ourceau and Friends: Live at Mona's (Celtic Grooves, 2004)
- Dale Ann Bradley: Catch Tomorrow (Compass, 2006)
- Lunasa & Tim O'Brien: Hands Across the Water (Compass, 2006)
- Alan Simon: Excalibur II (BMI, 2007)
- Armagh Pipers Club: 40th Anniversary Album (Armagh Pipers Club, 2008)
- Karan Casey: Ships in the Forest (Compass Records, 2008)
- Cillian Vallely & Kevin Crawford: On Common Ground (BallyO Records, 2009)
- Buille: Buille 2 (Crow Valley Music, 2009)
- Natalie Merchant: Leave Your Sleep (Nonesuch Records, 2010)
- Niall Vallely: Beyond Words (Crow Valley Music, 2012)
- Bruce Springsteen: High Hopes (Columbia Records, 2014)
- Caoimhin Vallely: Strayaway (Caoimhin Vallely, 2016)

With various artists, including Lúnasa

- Untamed - Next Generation Celtic (Narada, 2001)
- The Leitrim Equation 1 - Featuring Lúnasa (Leitrim County Council, 2009)

Film soundtracks

- Irish Jam (2006, various artists)
- The Golden Boys (2008, various artists)
