= The Merry Sisters of Fate =

Studio album by Lúnasa
- Released: 21 May 2001
- Recorded: 2001
- Studios: Marguerite Studios, Dublin
- Genre: Celtic
- Length: 43:22
- Label: Green Linnet
- Producer: Lúnasa

Lúnasa chronology
Otherworld (1999)	The Merry Sisters of Fate (2001)	Redwood (2003)

The Merry Sisters of Fate is an album by Irish Celtic band Lúnasa that was released in 2001 on Green Linnet Records. It is the band's third major release, and first with pipe player Cillian Vallely. The record is characterised as particularly rhythm-heavy and showcasing the band experimenting more with rhythm and sound than on previous records, and features numerous instruments atypical to Celtic music, such as lap steel guitar, piano, harmonium and clarinet, played by a number of guest musicians. Rhythm, melody and strings vary as the foreground of the music, which largely consists of Irish tunes.

The album was released to a very positive reception from music critics, who praised the inventful arrangements and textures. The band toured internationally in promotion of the album. In 2002, Lúnasa were awarded British/Celtic Album of the Year for this album by the U.S. Association for Independent Music, whilst Mojo hailed the band "the new gods of Irish music" following the release. The Irish Echo and Hot Press also named it among the year's best albums.

== Background and recording ==
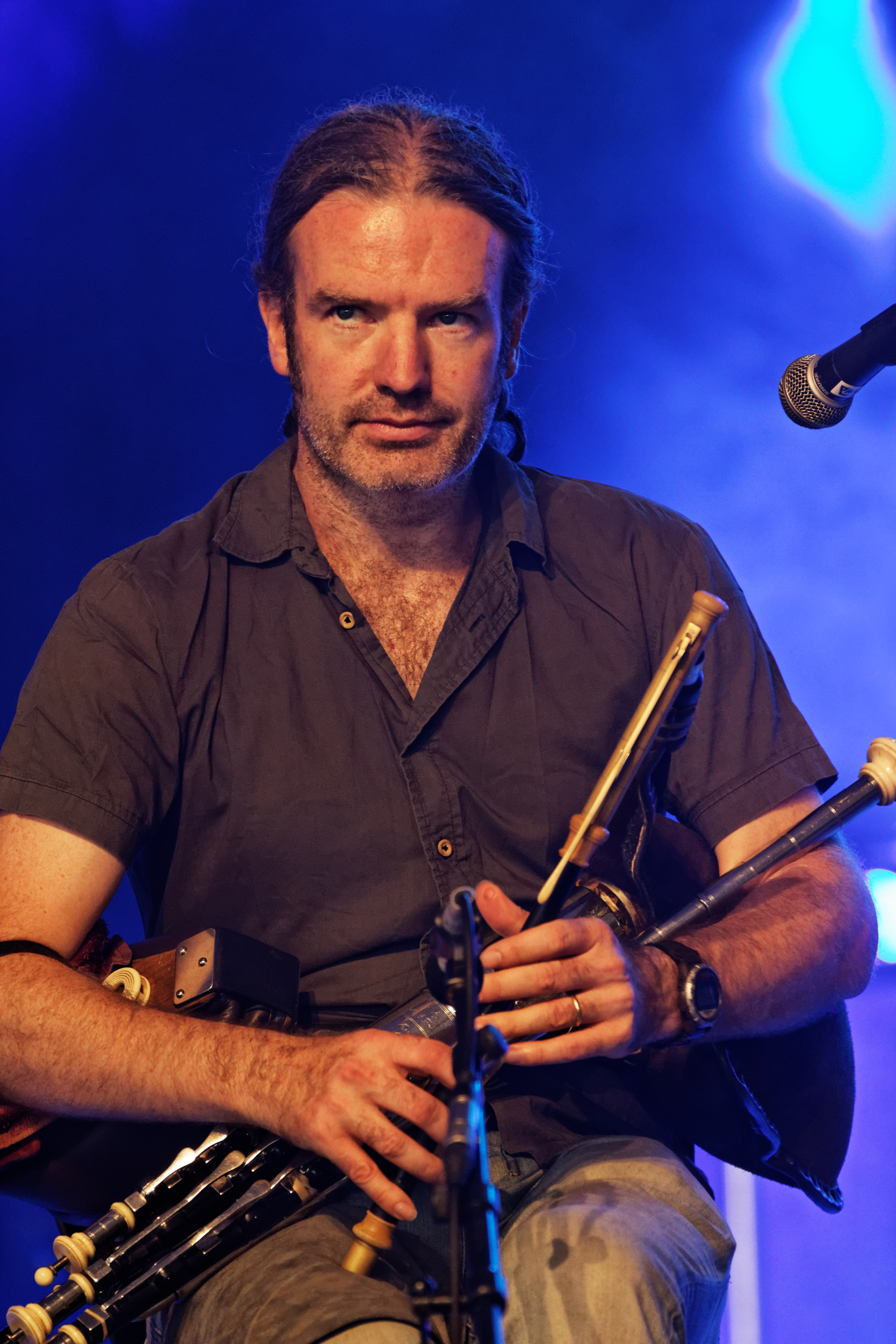
The Merry Sisters of Fate is Cillian Vallely's first album with Lúnasa.

After having built up success from 1996 to 1998, Irish Celtic music band Lúnasa signed a three-album deal with Green Linnet Records, on which they released their second album Otherworld (1999). Their first album with flutist and piper Kevin Crawford, it showed experimentation with Celtic music, delivering unusual techniques such as double-tracking and using musical instruments unusual to Celtic music. Otherworld was a unanimous critical success, with critics complimenting its innovative sound, and was an unprecedented commercial success, especially considering it was the band's first album released outside of Ireland; it became the fastest-selling album ever released on Green Linnet, which had been running for 25 years. American newspapers Irish Echo and Irish Voice both named the album "Traditional Album of the Year" in 1999.

Prior to releasing Otherworld, but after recording it, Cillian Vallely joined the band on uilleann pipes and whistle, marking a permanent replacement for Michael McGoldrick and John McSherry who both left the band in 1998 after the band's first album, but returned to reprise their roles as guests on Otherworld. Crawford said "We did a few gigs with Mike and John dividing the piping, and as the year progressed, Mike did more piping gigs than John. But we needed someone who could commit all of their time. We needed a full-time piper and there's where Cillian came on board." Vallely said "it was great to get the call to play with the lads, as I knew my natural piping style would fit in with what they were doing. It was music I liked and I understood where it was coming from in terms of the influences." The band soon began "to work on new music and arrangements for the new line up, and the band's third album marked Vallely's recording debut with the band.

Naming the album The Merry Sisters of Fate, the band recorded it in Marguerite Studios, Dublin, a studio complex which belongs to the band's double bassist Trevor Hutchinson. The album was also mixed at the studios, and was mastered at Mid-Atlantic Studios, also in Ireland. The band produced the album by themselves, with Dave Odlum, of Irish rock group The Frames providing co-production on several tunes. The recording sessions saw the band working in an increasingly experimental fashion; band biographer Bran San Martin noted "the expansiveness of the band's vision" to include collaborators on the album playing unusual instruments, but said that "the band's ambitions insured that the additional instrumentation enriched and never overwhelmed the proceedings." Hutchinson was once caught experimenting in the studio with a bow and bouzouki by the band's fiddle and whistle player Seán Smyth, who recalled thinking "This man has lost it." As with Otherworld, Lúnasa used multitrack recording for various instruments on the album, a technique atypical to Celtic music.

== Musical style ==
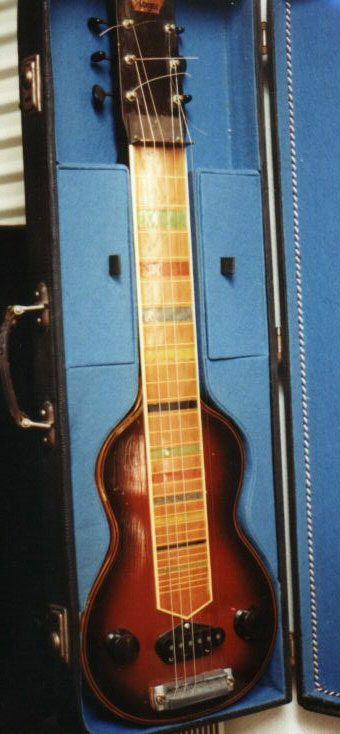
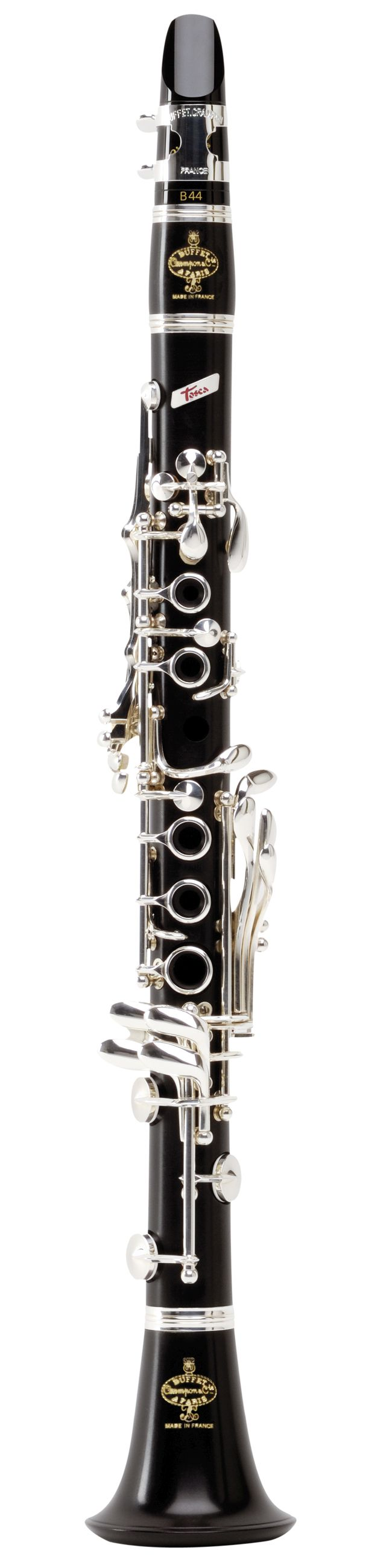
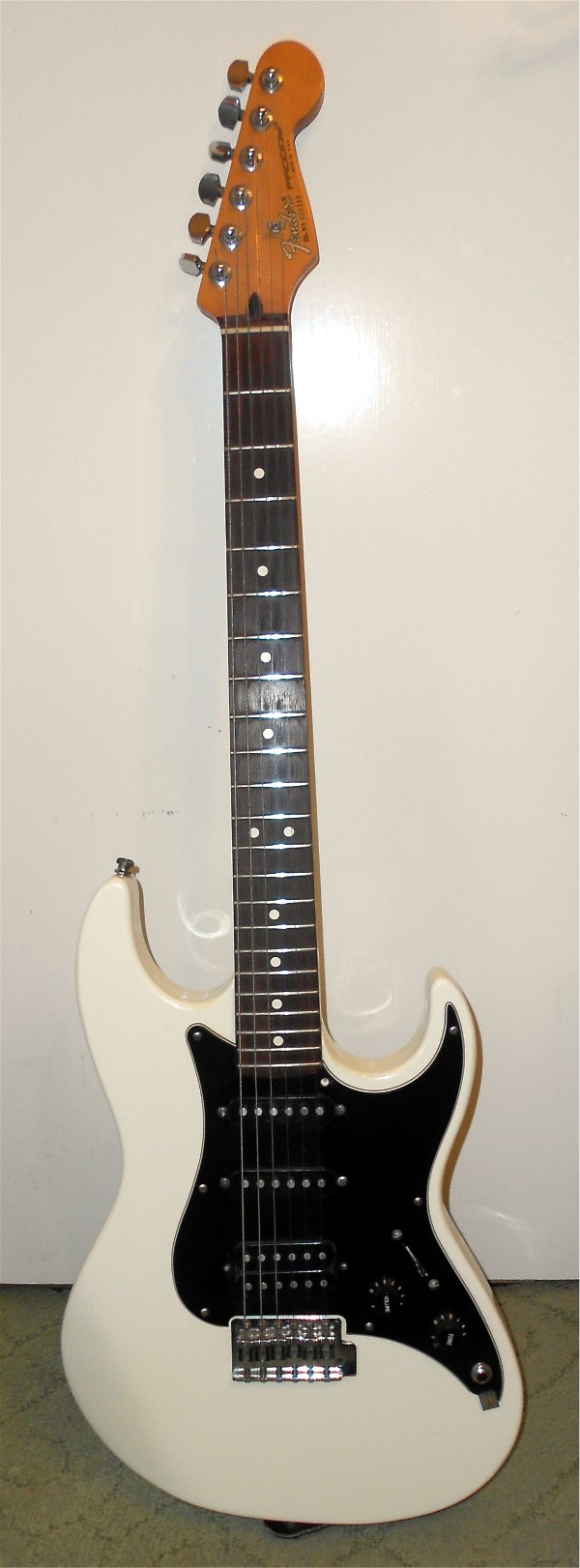
Atypical instruments featured on The Merry Sisters of Fate for "subtle shadings of texture" include lap steel guitar, clarinet and electric guitar.

The Merry Sisters of Fate has been described as a "merry and mesmerizing exploration of Irish, Breton, Galician and original music." Compared to previous albums, the album sees the band increase their experimentation with sound and rhythm. Seán Smyth recalled "I remember coming into the studio and seeing Trevor with the bow and the bouzouki and thinking 'This man has lost it'," but such experimentation became "an intrinsic component of their music". The band incorporate instruments unusual to Celtic music on The Merry Sisters of Fate, such as several electric guitars and "other exotica" including a lap steel guitar and clarinet, but "they mostly provide little more than subtle shadings of texture". Other unusual instruments featured on the album include harmonium and piano.

The tunes on the album range from reels, slip jigs and single instances of a double jig, piece, hornpipe, slide, march and song, as well as one instance of a waltz, a rare approach for the band. Irish tunes dominate the album, which the band "often perform with equal measures of finesse and ferocity" on the album, although there are tunes on the record taken from other countries, namely a Breton tune and three Asturian tunes. The Irish Times noted how "strings, rhythm and melody [swap] top billing when the time is right." Rhythm is at the centre of the album, with Trevor Hutchinson's double bass serving to "underpin" the album, whilst Valle;y's pipe playing adds "colour" and Hennessy's rhythmic, percussive acoustic guitar gives the album "much of the drive"; Roots World agreed that Hutchisnon "works as an impeccable anchor, constantly providing a strong frame for the band to build up its labyrinth of sounds. He is particularly effective with his long, drawn bowing technique, creating a feeling not only of depth but also of warmth; no sign of muddiness at all."

Besides the aforementioned inclusion of unusual instruments, the record is characterised by presenting "a softer touch" by the "fully confident" band, as opposed to Otherworld which "sparkled with all the energy of Lúnasa's live performances." The Irish Times said the album bears "fruit of every texture and hue". Mojo said the "thrilling rhythmic underlay" switches "pace and mood with a Donogh Hennessy guitar dynamic," whilst "irrepressible flautist Kevin Crawford is right up there with Matt Molloy and his flowing interplay with fiddle and pipes maintains a breathtaking pace and energy throughout." The Irish Times said "original tunes abound, finesse shares equal status with percussion, and so Sean Smyth's fiddle weaves cosily between Kevin Crawford's flute and Cillian Vallely's ever-subtle piping."

Hennessy's acoustic guitar "has taken half a step into the realms of rock" on the album; "there are glimpses of another world with his at times repetitive, at times contrapuntal acoustic work. Much of the drive is generated by his astounding sense of rhythm." Meanwhile, Dave Hingerty provides "unobtrusive" percussion on one track, "adding seasoning;" Roots World described Hutchinson, Hennessy, and Odlum, Deane and Hingerty's guest appearances as providing "the bed on which the melodies lie", which are provided by flutist Kevin Crawford, who "has a warmth and fluidity that brings out the soul of the tunes", and piper Cillian, "a perfect partner for Crawford. He plays the tunes, seeming to find new expression in every phrase, every note." Meanwhile, fiddle player Seán Smyth provides "contrast, power and depth". The album's "rare" sound was described by Roots World:

"The basic lineup of Lunasa features pipes, flute, whistle, fiddle, guitar and bass. A handful of guest players add a little piano here, a bit of clarinet there, a touch of percussion, some steel guitar and even a taste of harmonium. Nothing outrageous. But when these instruments are played by musicians of the caliber found in Lunasa, something magical begins to happen. Tunes may be familiar, rhythms may be typical, but this band go one step further."

== Structure ==
"While the album expanded the band's aural pallet in small degrees by adding subtle shades of other instruments like lap steel guitar and clarinet, it kept to the band's core driving acoustic sound, emphasizing the pipes, guitar and string bass and the masterful way the band wrapped the instruments around traditional jigs and reels."

— Scott Feemstar on The Merry Sisters of Fate.

The opening track, "Aoibhneas", is made up of three tunes, the first of which, the "Aoibhneas Eilis Ni Cheallaigh" jig, is characterised by "Donogh Hennessy's driving rhythmic guitar" with "Kevin Crawford's flute and Sean Smyth's fiddle taking up the lead lines." The "rather nifty segue" between the track's second tune, "Jimmy Ward's", into its third and final tune, "Not Safe with a Razor", was described as "a typical demonstration of the band's main strength, that of the art of arrangement. Many of today's aspiring Celtic musicians could take note for a well-structured arrangement is pivotal in keeping the audience's attention." "Not Safe with a Razor" was composed in circa 1975 by L.E. McCullough. The second track, "Donogh & Mike's", is an offbeat reel featuring lap steel guitar played by Ed Dean. Deane's lap steel guitar and David Odlum's own guitar work "complement" Hennessy's rhythmic acoustic guitar playing on the track "with their own contrasting styles". The track consists of two reels, "1 August" and "Windbrook", the latter "a legacy" from the band's former member Mike McGoldrick.

"The Kilarney Boys of Pleasure" features "the addition of Hennessy's electric guitar" which "adds warmth" to the track. The band's "multitracked parts combine to produce a dark and complex atmosphere" on the track. "The Merry Sisters of Fate" is a "barnburning rave-up" that is "as in-your-face a traditional track as you'll hear anywhere" according to one review, "bridged by Hennessy's percussive picking and dotted with tantalizing embellishments from the flute, fiddle and pipes carrying each melody." The track's introduction, featuring a flute-fiddle combination from Crawford and Smyth, was described by The Irish Echo as "propulsive". The track uses two reels, "Merry Sisters" and "Longacre". "Iníon Ní Scannláin," a single waltz, is "a brooding beauty of a tune" composed by Hennessy" which features piano work by Pat Fitzpatrick. The band said waltzes are "not our thing really", but they joked that Hennessy "demanded they play it"; he wrote it for Pauline, "a very beautiful girl" from Dingle.

"Páistín Fionn" features clarinet being played by guest musician Kieran Wilde, which was described by reviewers as "courtly" and an "odd addition". "Casu", a medley of "Asturian Air", "Aires De Pontevedra", and "Muineira De Casu", progresses "from a haunting slow melody to the quick-step sizzle of two dance numbers, all done Irish-style." The tunes used in the track come from northwestern Spain, specifically Galicia and Asturias. "The Minor Bee", a medley of "Minor Slip"/"Rondede Loudeac"/"The Red Bee", shows the band "nimbly dart between borders" with Hutchinson and Hennessy's "driving rhythm"; the first tune in the medley "begins with an Irish traditional dance tune played briskly by Vallely and Smyth," then shifting to the second tune, "a Breton rond performed with nipping precision by Crawford," before finishing with the final tune, "Smyth's feverish fiddle lead on a reel written by the revered 85-year-old Leitrim musician Joe Liddy." "Scully Casey's" sees Crawford deliver "a relaxed, inventive grace to his flute playing". "Return From Fingal", a traditional track and "Ennis favourite", is given "a stylish treatment".

== Release ==
The Merry Sisters of Fate was released by Green Linnet Records on 21 May 2001 in the United Kingdom and Ireland and 5 June 2001 in the United States. It was their second of three albums for the label. It was also released in the Netherlands by Fréa Records and in Spain by Resistencia. Romanian, London-based Giorgia Bertazzi, the band's usual graphic artist, created the album cover and photographed the images used throughout the album artwork.

The band promoted the album in different ways; in summer 2001, Seán Smyth was interviewed by Geoff Wallis for fRoots magazine, whilst throughout summer 2001, the band toured the United States. The tour concluded on 28 August with a free concert performed before approximately 4,000 people outside the World Trade Center in Manhattan, exactly two weeks before the center's towers were destroyed in the September 11 attacks; upon hearing about the attack, Crawford "immediately conveyed his sympathy and support from his home in West Clare, and his words circulated on the Internet." In promotion of the album, the band ultimately toured worldwide as they had done for Otherworld; besides the concerts in the United States, they played in the United Kingdom, Australia, Scandinavia, Israel, France and Austria. In the United States they played with Mary Chapin Carpenter whilst in Ireland they played with Ladysmith Black Mambazo.

=== Critical reception ===
Professional ratings
Review scores
Source	Rating
Allmusic	4.5/5 stars
The Irish Times	5/5 stars

The Merry Sisters of Fate received acclaim from critics. Rick Anderson of Allmusic gave it four and a half stars out of five, saying he "highly recommended" the album and highlighting it as an "Album Pick". Jamie O'Brien of Roots World was very positive, calling the band's playing quality "exceptional", noting "every tune is one that sticks in your mind. The arrangements draw out the best in the characteristics of the instruments, while allowing individuals to step forward and combinations to ebb and flow. Everything is uncluttered yet busy and purposeful. The production is close to perfection - listen to the whole sound, or focus on one particular instrument, the choice is yours. Even the final fade promises much; you know they're heading into the future, not obscurity." He concluded that "everything about The Merry Sisters of Fate, from its content to its title, shows that not only have they produced a worthy successor [to Otherworld], they have also moved a step or two forward." Similarly praiseful was Pete Fyfe of Folking, who said "all of the tunes on this 11 set album go with a swing and the self-assured way in which they are put across leaves you in no doubt that Irish music is in safe hands and continuing to break the boundaries of musical prejudice."

Newspaper The Irish Times rated the album five stars out of five, meaning the album is "absolutely unmissable". The review said "third album in and they're already breaking speed limits" and concluded that "it doesn't get much better that this." Mojo said the "wondrously fiery" album was "blistering, yet also imaginative", concluding that the "earthy, soulful, and instinctive" album surpassed the band's "last benchmark album, Otherworld." Oliver Sweeney of Hot Press was very favourable, saying "the best tribute I can pay to Lunasa and this magnificent record, is that every time I play it – and I do play it every day – it reveals something fresh and new," commenting that "at years end, it will be as it is now, right up there with the best of them". Less savoury was Mick Furey of The Living Tradition, who was "slightly unsatisfied" that it shows the band "concentrating too much on arrangement", but said regardless that "it's all good stuff" and commended the "tight playing" and "good arrangements of old and new tunes".

== Accolades and legacy ==
At the end of the year, The Irish Echo placed The Merry Sisters of Fate at number 3 in their list of the top 10 traditional albums of 2001, beaten to number one by Crawford's solo album In Good Company; Crawford was also named "The Irish Echo's Traditional Artist of the Year 2001." In 2002, Lúnasa were awarded "British/Celtic Album of the Year" by the U.S. Association for Independent Music for the album, whilst Mojo hailed the band "the new gods of Irish music" following the release.

On the band's "best of" album The Story So Far (2008), three tracks from The Merry Sisters of Fate are included: "Killarney Boys of Pleasure", "Casu" and a new exclusive re-recording of "Morning Nightcap", recorded with the help of Erik Jaskowiak at Compass Sound Studio, Nashville, Tennessee in October 2006. Many of the album's tracks became live staples for the band, as evidenced by their live album Lúnasa with the RTÉ Concert Orchestra (2013), a collaboration with the RTÉ Concert Orchestra which reworks many of the band's to incorporate orchestral parts, which features renditions of four tracks from Merry Sisters; "Casu", "The Minor Bee", "The Merry Sisters of Fate", which is combined with "Dr Gilbert's", and "Morning Nightcap". The footage of the performance of "Morning Nightcap" is also included on the release as an Enhanced CD element. The sheet music to all the tracks from The Merry Sisters of Fate were published in Donogh Hennessy's music book Lúnasa: The Music 1996–2001 (2002).

== Track listing ==
1. Aoibhneas 4:22
  (Aoibhneas Eilis Ni Cheallaigh, Jimmy Ward's, Not Safe With A Razor)
2. Donogh and Mike's 3:52
  (1 August, Windbroke)
3. Killarney Boys of Pleasure 4:06
4. The Merry Sisters of Fate 2:55
  (The Merry Sisters Of Fate, The Longacre)
5. Iníon Ni Scannláin (by Donogh Hennessy) 2:47
6. Casu 4:17
  (Asturian Air, Aires De Pontevedra, Muineira De Casu)
7. Páistin Fionn 3:51
8. The Minor Bee 4:46
  (Minor Slip, Ronde De Loudeac, The Red Bee)
9. Scully's 4:12
  (Scully Casey's, The Dusty Miller)
10. Return from Fingal 3:16
11. Morning Nightcap 4:56
  (The Wedding, Morning Nightcap, The Malbay Shuffle)

For a detailed analysis of this album's contents see the Irishtune.info album page.

== Personnel ==
- Lúnasa – arrangements
- Donogh Hennessy – guitar (tracks 4–10), acoustic guitar (tracks 3, 11), electric guitar (tracks 3, 11), nylon strings guitar (tracks 1, 2), steel string guitar (tracks 1, 2), low whistle (track 9), whistle (track 5)
- Cillian Vallely – uilleann pipes (tracks 1–4, 6, 8, 9, 11), B♭ pipes (track 10), low whistle (tracks 3, 5, 9, 11), F low whistle (track 7)
- Trevor Hutchinson – bass (double bass)
- Seán Smyth – fiddle (tracks 1–4, 6–11), low whistle (tracks 8, 9), B♭ low whistle (track 5),
- Kevin Crawford – flute (tracks 1–4, 6, 8, 9, 11), B♭ flute (tracks 5, 10), low whistle (tracks 3, 8), F low whistle (track 7), whistle (track 11)
- Kieran Wilde – clarinet (tracks 5, 7)
- David Odlum – guitar (track 6), electric guitar (tracks 2a, 3)
- Patz Fitzpatrick – piano (track 5), clarinet arrangement (track 5), harmonium (track 7)
- Ed Dean – lap steel guitar (track 2)
- Dave Hingerty – percussion (track 3)
- Miriam Ingram – clarinet arrangement (track 7)
- Naoimh Ingram – cover, design
- Giorgia Bertazzi – photography
- David Odlum – recording and mixing (tracks 2–4, 6, 9)
- Ed Kenehan – recording and mixing (tracks 1, 5, 7, 8, 10, 11)
