= Lúnasa (disambiguation) =

Lúnasa or Lughnasadh is a Gaelic festival marking the beginning of the harvest season.

Lúnasa may also refer to:

- Lúnasa (band), a traditional Irish band
  - Lúnasa (album), a 1998 album by Lúnasa
