= Redwood (album) =

Studio album by Lúnasa
- Released: 3 June 2003
- Recorded: February 2002
- Studios: Prairie Sun Recording Studios, Cotati, California
- Genre: Celtic
- Length: 43:17
- Label: Green Linnet
- Producer: Lúnasa

Lúnasa chronology
The Merry Sisters of Fate (2001)	Redwood (2003)	The Kinnitty Sessions (2004)

Redwood is an album by Lúnasa that was released in 2003 on Green Linnet Records. It was their fourth major release, and their last album on Green Linnet Records. The band conceived the album in October 2001 whilst staying in a Californian lodge; the band aimed to record an album that would capture the band's live feel whilst at the same time retaining the sonic quality that the band feature on their albums. The band took a ten-day break from their February 2002 American tour to record the album at Prairie Sun Recording Studios in California. It is characterised by a more relaxed sound than previous albums, and less guest musicians.

Releasing the album became an issue when the band entered a heated dispute with Green Linnet, a feud which almost prevented the album from being released. Ultimately the band left the label and three versions of Redwood were released, with alternating artwork and music masters. The official version was self-released by the band on their website and from concerts. Redwood was released to positive reviews from music critics, praising the band's vibrancy. The Irish Echo named it the 6th best album of 2003. Nonetheless, the band were unsatisfied with the mastering and mixing on the record, and remixed and remastered several of its songs in later years.

== Recording and concept ==
Between 1998 and 2001, Lúnasa released their first three albums, all of them highly acclaimed, eclectic mixes of traditional and modern Celtic music, the most latterly of which, The Merry Sisters of Fate (2001), was awarded "British/Celtic Album of the Year" by the U.S. Association for Independent Music. Mojo magazine hailed the band "the new gods of Irish music" following that album's release. These albums were marked by numerous guest appearances and unusual approaches to both recording and instrumentation. For their next album, the band wanted to deliberately forgo their studio approach.

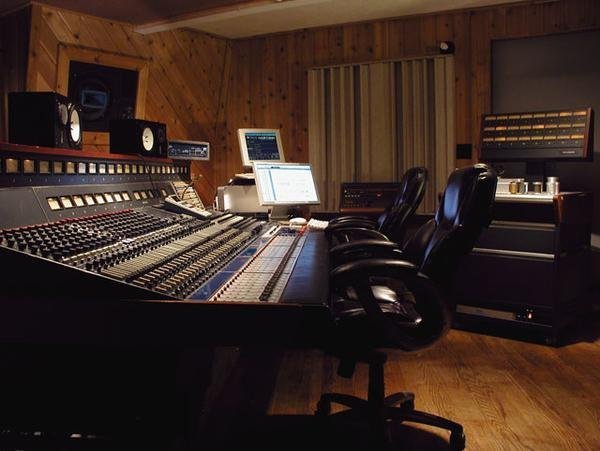
Redwood was recorded at Prairie Sun Recording Studios, California.

In October 2001, the band conceived their fourth album, Redwood, when they were taking a break near Occidental, California, in a ranch belonging to Matt Greenhill. The band said that with this album, they intended to "capture the live impact of Lúnasa, without losing the sonic quality that we always endeavour to achieve on our albums." The band visited several studios in the local area to see if where they wanted to record Redwood, and ultimately chose the famous Prairie Sun Recording Studios in Cotati, California. The musicians became "thoroughly familiar with the material" on the album by playing them live beforehand, and also familiarised themselves with "what everyone else is going to play." As a result of the tracks "being broken in by being played in concert," Chris Nickson of Allmusic said that the album's "sets sparkle."

Halfway through touring the United States in February 2002, the band took a ten-day break to record the album in the studios, only using one of the studio's rooms. It marked the first time they had recorded an album outside of Ireland. The band said that the recording sessions were "a wonderful and unique experience." The tracks were completed at band member Trevor Hutchinson's own studio, Marguerite Studios, Dublin, Ireland, where the album was also mixed. The record was mastered at Nashville's Final Stage Mastering. Randy Leory engineered the entire album, whilst Ed Kenehan recorded and mixed the album, with recording assistance from Eugene Cornelius on three tracks.

== Music ==
More stripped down and laidback than its predecessors, Redwood features "highly innovative arrangements of traditional tunes" and new compositions composed by several of the band members. One biography said that, "with Redwood, the group tried hard to re-create for record what one of their live gigs was like, complete with their trademark break-neck speed interplay between the instruments and their peerless musicianship." Although Jim Higgins of The Stunning appears as a guest musician, playing bodhran on "Temple Hill," there are almost no guests on the album, an unusual approach to a Lúnasa album which, along with the relaxed recording studio, gives the album's tracks "room to breathe;" "there's a bit less yang, and a bit more ying," said Alex Monaghan of FolkWorld. Chris Nickson of Allmusic said there is "a rare fire and flow to the music–a piece like 'Two-Fifty to Vigo' just slides along smoothly." Nickson said "there's plenty of risk-taking in the arrangements, such as using three whistles on 'Spoil the Dance,' or the duet between flute and fiddle on the gorgeous 'Harp and Shamrock'."

"Speed is not everything, understanding the tune is. With this understanding, the musicians are able to develop the essence of the tunes as they explore the intricacies of the rhythm. Similarly, they appreciate the dynamics of the instruments, the effects particular pairings can have, and then place them into new contexts."

— Jamie O'Brien of Roots World describing the band's approach on Redwood.

Of the eleven tracks on the album, there are twenty-four tunes, half of which are reels, and the other half consisting of three double jigs, four slip jigs, one hornpipe, two polkas, one song and one fling. Ten of the tracks are medleys. The mix of traditional and modern tunes on the album lead to Allmusic commenting that "Lúnasa is masterful at finding good tunes" and noting they make "parts as complex as theirs sound easy." Describing the band's new approaches, Roots World said that the band's guitarist Donogh Hennessy "seeks out new chord progressions, pushing tunes into a higher gear, adding an accompaniment worth listening to in its own right; yet he is also able to provide an appropriate sensitive finger-picked guitar when required," whilst the band's bassist Trevor Hutchinson, "long regarded as a major accompanist in Irish circles, is close to perfection with his double bass playing. With Lunasa's distinctive approach, old tunes take on a new lease of life while new tunes appear as old as the hills."

"Cregg's Pipes" is a reworking of a Bothy Band track which "adds a pair of quirky little-known reels." A rhythmic set, "the interplay between the three lead instruments as they weave in and out of the melody, brings out tuneful qualities which are not immediately apparent." "Welcome Home" was described as combining "a Donegal jig with a sumptuous Junior Crehan tune and a jaunty new reel from Donogh Hennessy." After "Harp and Shamrock" slows the album down, the pace is picked up again "in fine Breton style" by "Fest Noz". "Spoil the Dance" is "a set of three great reels given the famous Lúnasa low whistle treatment, finishing off with Cillian Vallely's pipes rampant." "Two-Fifty to Vigo" is a cover of the Shooglenifty track from their debut album Venus in Tweeds (1995), whilst "Temple Hill" features the band "negotiating the tricky turns of the melody at a dangerous speed."

== Release and dispute with Green Linnet ==
Redwood had been long-anticipated throughout 2002, and the band had announced it by November of that year, and had started playing tracks from it in concert. However, when intending to release Redwood, Lúnasa encountered numerous contractual problems with their record label Green Linnet Records, as did many of their labelmates. The dispute became heated and public, and almost prevented the album from being released, though the band only commented that "things didn't quite work out as planned." Geoff Wallis of Irish Music Review said Redwood was the only known example of an "Irish traditional album release which has been the subject of as much acrimony" besides "the notorious Planxty bootleg." One commentary later said that "the legal machinations surrounding [the album] almost saw that album sinking without trace and taking this influential Irish band with it." The Irish Echo said the band's "heated conctractual dispute" with the label "became public and tended to overshadow the musical merits" of Redwood.

Because of the numerous problems, three different versions of Redwood were ultimately released; although in as early as November 2002, The Irish Times commented the album was "chomping at the bit to be released from the traps", Lúnasa themselves self-released the official version only on their website and from their concerts in early 2003. This version of the album contains the correct master of the album and artwork, as does the Japanese version, which albeit contains Japanese text. Green Linnet themselves released their version of the album on 3 June 2003 with the incorrect artwork and, initially, an incorrect master of the album, before "eventually" releasing the correct version. Irish Music Review's Geoff Wallis said that the Green Linnet version "sounds distinctly muddy," and commented on its slightly different artwork from other editions, which was not designed by Naoimh Ingram, the group's regular graphic designer, unlike the official version.

Although Redwood completed the band's three-album contract with Green Linnet, the band chose not to resign with the label due to the affair, and instead signed to Compass Records for their subsequent album, The Kinnitty Sessions (2004), which one critic descibred as "a deliberate attempt to recreate Lúnasa’s independence and regain control over their music and recorded output."

== Reception and legacy ==
Professional ratings
Review scores
Source	Rating
Allmusic	link

Redwood received a positive reception from critics. Chris Nickson of Allmusic rated the album four stars out of five, calling the album "a welcome treat" and saying the band "succeed beautifully" in re-creating their live feel. He also commented that "the musicianship is beyond question" and concluded that "their previous albums have shown their intent to push Irish music a little and not be satisfied with the status quo; this shows that they really do have the power to remake Irish music in their own image." The Green Man were positive, saying "In their own way, their grasp of Irish music matches that of the legendary Moving Hearts, especially in their ability to use traditional music without getting too stuffy."

Alex Monaghan of The Living Tradition was favourable, saying "every track in these forty-three minutes is a precious nugget" and described it as "another near-perfect CD from Ireland's best instrumental band. So far, the lads have avoided adding a female singer (today's ultimate fashion accessory). When you're this good you don't need to be trendy." Jamie O'Brien of Roots World said "the flitting of the flute, the dance of the fiddle, the flow of the pipes, the strong guitar and bass: Lunasa's lineup is not unique, but their playing is. The quintet possesses a magic rarely found in others. Perhaps the best compliment is that they do not need a vocalist - an evening and an album of instrumental music by Lunasa is time well spent." Craig's Music Reviews said that Redwood continues the band's successful "ability to blend traditional Irish songs with their own compositions so that the average listener cannot tell the difference between the two."

The Irish Echo ranked Redwood at number 6 on their "top 10 albums of 2003" list. As with some of the band's previous albums, the album was considered innovative by some critics. Band opinions on the album are mixed; band member Kevin Crawford, talking about Redwood in 2008, said "the reason I like Redwood is a combination of the tunes and also the playing," although he said "I was never that happy with the way the album was mixed and mastered and I think it suffered a bit because of this." For the band's "best-of" album The Story So Far (2008), all of the tracks were exclusively remixed and remastered, and the tracks from Redwood included on the compilation, "Fest Noz" and "Cregg's Pipes", were especially "given a new lease of life," in effort to "repair" those tracks.

== Live performances ==
In the Redwood era, the band increasingly "channeled their energies" into their live concerts, which, "in 2002 and 2003, were ever more edgy and riveting," according to band biographer Bran San Martin, "scaling back on some of the more lush elements of the band's sound and delighting in exhilarating, propulsive energy." In the era, they toured the United States three times among many other places and in 2003 played a "much-covered appearance" at the Celtic Connections festival in Glasgow. That same summer they played at Quebec City Summer Festival, playing alongside such musicians as Billy Bragg, Bob Geldof, Daniel Lanois, Bruce Cockburn, Rosanne Cash, among others; the performance won the band the Coup de Coeur Miroir prize.

== Track listing ==
No.	Title	Length
1.	"Cregg's Pipes" (Cregg's Pipes / Uist Reel / John Doherty's)	3:34
2.	"Welcome Home" (Welcome Home Grainne / I Have A House Of My Own With A Chimney Built On The Top Of It / Rockfield Reel)	3:59
3.	"Harp and Shamrock" (Harp and Shamrock / Mick O'Connor's Reel)	3:59
4.	"Fest Noz" (Ridees 6 Temps)	3:53
5.	"Spoil the Dance" (Michael McDermott's / Tuttles Reel / Spoil the Dance)	4:36
6.	"A Stor Mo Croi" (A Stor Mo Croi / Stack of Rye / Ladies, Step Up To Tea)	6:21
7.	"Dublin to Dingle" (James Kelly's / The Foxhunt / John Brosnan's / West Kerry Polka)	4:07
8.	"Lady Ellen" (Tana / Lady Ellen)	3:10
9.	"Cotati Nights" (Enez Sant Loran's / Princess of the Manor / Hunters Road)	4:02
10.	"Two-fifty to Vigo"	2:37
11.	"Temple Hill" (Patrick Conneely's / Johnny Mciljohn's / Temple Hill)	2:40

For a detailed analysis of this album's contents see the Irishtune.info album page.
