= The Story So Far... (Lúnasa album) =

Greatest hits album by Lúnasa
- Released: March 4, 2008
- Genre: Celtic
- Length: 67:39
- Label: Compass Records

Lúnasa chronology
Sé (2006)	The Story So Far... (2008)	Lá Nua (2010)

Professional ratings
Review scores
Source	Rating
Allmusic	4.5/5 stars

The Story So Far... is the seventh album by Lúnasa. It was released in 2008 on Compass Records, and was mainly arranged by Trevor Hutchinson. Two tracks, "Morning Nightcap" and "Aibreann" were re-recorded in Nashville. Other tracks were revisited and remixed. It is considered a best-of album.

== Track listing ==
1. Morning Nightcap [New Version]
  (McLeod's Farewell, Morning Nightcap, The Malbay Shuffle)
  The Merry Sisters of Fate
2. Eanáir
  (Lord Mayo, Gavotte, Maid of Mt. Cisco)
  Lúnasa
3. The Miller of Drohan
  Otherworld
4. Leckan Mór
  (Kalyana, Above in the Garret, Leckan Mór)
  Sé
5. Killarney Boys of Pleasure
  The Merry Sisters of Fate
6. The Floating Crowbar
  (The Floating Crowbar, Splendid Isolation, The Almost Reel)
  Otherworld
7. Black River
  (Across the Black River, Iain MacDonald's)
  Sé
8. Fest Noz
  (Ridees 6 temps)
  Redwood
9. Feabhra
  (An erc'h war an enezeg [Snow on the Island], Brenda Stubbrt's, Thunderhead)
  Lúnasa
10. Punch
  (Scottish Concerto Strathspey, Trip to Windsor, Punch in the Dark)
  The Kinnitty Sessions
11. Casu
  (Asturian Air, Aires de Pontevedra, Muneira de Casu)
  The Merry Sisters of Fate
12. The Last Pint [New Version of Aibreann]
  Lúnasa
13. Cregg's Pipes
  (Cregg's Pipes, Uist Reel, John Doherty's)
  Redwood
14. The Dimmers
  (Jerry O'Sullivan's, The Dimmers)
  The Kinnitty Sessions
15. The Dingle Berries
  (The Hop Slide, Padraig O'Keefe's, Nessa the Mover, Trip to Dingle)
  Sé
16. O'Carolan's Welcome/Rolling in the Barrel
  Otherworld
