= Brendan Power =

- Born: 7 September 1956 (age 70); Mombasa, Kenya
- Genres: Blues, folk, traditional Irish, traditional Chinese, Bulgarian, original and experimental
- Instruments: Chromatic harmonica, diatonic harmonica, custom harmonica, vocals
- Years active: 1976–present
- Website: brendan-power.com

Brendan Power (born 7 September 1956) is a New Zealand harmonica player, composer and inventor, living in Britain.

Born in Mombasa, Kenya, Power's family moved to New Zealand in 1965 where he later attended Canterbury University at Christchurch, gaining a Bachelor of Arts in English & Religious Studies, and a Master of Arts in Religious Studies. Power wrote his thesis on the Taoist philosopher Chuang Tzu.

Power discovered the harmonica at university after hearing Sonny Terry play at a concert by the blues duo Sonny Terry and Brownie McGhee. Power subsequently taught himself to play harmonica by ear and music soon took over from academia as his main passion.

Power moved to London in 1992 where he worked for three years as a soloist in the Riverdance Show. He was later employed by Suzuki Musical Instrument Corporation of Japan as their International Harmonica Specialist in 2008, a position he held for five years.

In April 2013, along with his business partner Zombor Kovacs, Power started X-reed Harmonicas, a project devoted to making custom harmonicas. As of 2024, Power has released new products under the X-Reed moniker with renowned harmonica technician, André Coelho.

== Music ==
Power is well known for his extraordinary technical playing ability on the harmonica. Jools Holland introduced him as "a wonder on the harmonica" when Power played live with Tim Edey and Lucy Randall, on Later with Jools Holland in 2004, while Allmusic describes him as "a master of the chromatic harmonica and blues harp".

Power has recorded more than 20 albums beginning with Country Harmonica (1984) and the latest being New Chinese Harmonica (2012), and has recorded with many well-known Irish artists, including: Altan, Arcady, Mary Black, Paul Brady, Dónal Lunny, and Arty McGlynn.

Power recorded harmonica on Sting's Ten Summoner's Tales (1993), on Andy Irvine's Way Out Yonder (2000), on Kate Bush's Director's Cut (2011), and has recorded music for several movie soundtracks, including the Oscar-winning soundtrack for Atonement (2007) and Shanghai Noon (2000)

== Inventions and innovations ==
Power has created several new harmonica tunings including Paddy Richter and PowerBender, and has introduced several new harmonica types, including the Slide Diatonic and ChromaBender.

Power invented the concept of 'Half-Valving' in 1980, and was a co-inventor with Will Scarlett of the 'extra-reed' concept for achieving greater pitch bending ability in harmonicas. In 2014 he took out a provisional patent on what he calls the 'Twin-Harmonica System', a design enabling two harmonicas of any type to be linked together behind a master air-shifting slider for enhanced musical possibilities.

In 2021 Power released the Modular-Reed Harmonica system, enabling players to change individual reeds in their harmonicas, facilitating both easy replacement of damaged reeds and the changing of the harmonica's tuning. The author Pat Missin wrote on his website: "I think this is potentially the biggest thing to hit diatonic harmonicas since Lee Oskar introduced replaceable reedplates back in the 1980s."

== Awards and accolades ==
In 1993, Power won the All-Ireland competition in the mouth organ and miscellaneous instrument categories.

Power was voted International Harmonica Player of the Year 2011/12. by The Society for the Preservation and Advancement of the Harmonica (SPAH) organisation of America.

In February 2012, Power and Tim Edey won the Best Duo award at the 2012 BBC Radio 2 Folk Awards.

== Discography ==
- State Of The Harp (Jayrem Records, 1990)
- Live At Scoop De Loop (with Gary Verberne) (Not On Label, 1990)
- Harmonica Nights (Jayrem Records, 1991)
- Licks "N' Spits with Gary Verberne (Not On Label, 1991)
- Digging In (Rimu Records, 1992)
- New Irish Harmonica (Punch Music, 1994) (Green Linnet, 1995)
- Blow In (Hummingbird Records, 1995)
- Plays The Music From Riverdance (Greentrax, 1997)
- Dawn To Dusk (Jayrem Records, 1998)
- Harmonica (Wings Music, 1998)
- Two Trains Running (with Dave Peabody) (Indigo Delux, 2000)
- Tradish (Tethnik Records, 2004)
- Back To Back (with P.T. Gazell) (Tethnik Records, MissMax Records, 2008)
- Lament For The 21st Century (Candyrat Records, 2008)
- Power & White (with Andrew White) (Candyrat Records, 2009)
- Wriggle And Writhe (with Tim Edey) (Gnatbite Records, 2012)
- New Chinese Harmonica (Tethnik Records, 2012)
- Harp to Harp (with Anne-Marie O'Farrell, Tethnik Records, 2015)
- PUFFNSAW (with Jane Rothfield, Tethnik Records, 2016)
- Sketches in Blue (with Joe Jones, Tethnik Records, 2017)
- Harmonica and Button-Box (with Tim Edey, Tethnik Records, 2017)
- Unadorned - New Irish Harmonica 2 (Tethnik Records, 2018)

Power and Kilkelly

- Jig Jazz (Not On Label, 1996)

Prosser, Power, & Randall

- Nomads - Cellar Sessions May 2006 (Rafting Dog Records, 2006)

== Singles & EPs ==
- Heat-Seeker (Festival Records, 1993)
