= D Flute Album =

'D' Flute Album

Studio album by Kevin Crawford
- Released: October 31, 1995
- Genre: Celtic
- Length: 47:21
- Label: Green Linnet Records

Kevin Crawford chronology
'D' Flute Album (1995)	In Good Company (2001)

Professional ratings
Review scores
Source	Rating
Allmusic	4.5/5 stars

'D' Flute Album is the first solo album released by Kevin Crawford. It was released in 1995 on Green Linnet Records. The tracks on this album are Kevin primarily playing the 'D' flute and accompanied by guitar, piano, keyboard and/or bodhrán.

== Musicians ==
Kevin Crawford (D concert flute, bamboo flute, whistles and bodhrán)
Dónal Clancy (guitars)
Carl Hession (piano and keyboards)

== Track listing ==
1. George White's Favourite / The Silgo Maid (reels) 3:27
2. Jim Donoghue's, Gorman's / Kiss Me Kate (reels) 3:24
3. Christy Barry's Set (jigs) 4:08
4. Paddy Fahy's / The Echo (hornpipes) 2:48
5. Fisherman's Farewell / Junior Crehan's (reels) 3:50
6. The Mill Pond / The Battering Ram (jigs) 3:00
7. Dillon's Fancy / Maids In The Meadow / Toss The Feathers (reels) 3:10
8. Season Of Mists (slow airs) 2:46
9. Maurice Lennon's / Connie O'Connell's (reels 2:56
10. Jug Of Brown Ale / Spot The Wollop (jigs) 3:49
11. Sporting Paddy / The Abbey Reel (reels) 2:30
12. Green Fields Of Rossbeigh / The New Policeman (reels) 3:14
13. Blackberry Blossom / Brady's / The Steam Packet (reels) 3:23
14. The Flowers Of Brooklyn / The Palm Tree / The Bucks Of Oranmore (reels) 3:23
