= Kevin Crawford =

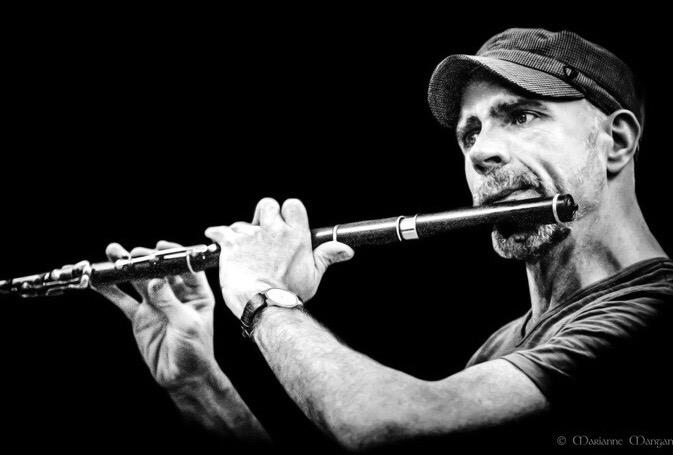
- Kevin Crawford

Background information
- Born: 6 December 1967 (age 58); Birmingham, England
- Genres: Irish traditional music, Celtic music
- Occupation: Musician
- Instruments: Flute, tin whistle, low whistle, bodhran
- Labels: Green Linnet, BallyO

Kevin Crawford (born 6 December 1967 in Birmingham, England) is an Irish flute, tin whistle, low whistle and bodhrán player. He was born in England to Irish parents from Milltown Malbay, County Clare. He later moved to West Clare to improve his music and become more exposed to traditional Irish music.

== Bands ==
He started in the late 1980s with English band Long Acre working with artists such as Mick Conneely, Brendan Boyle, Bernadette Davis, Joe Molloy and Ivan Miletitch. After recording and co-producing what he described as his most "traditional" CD with "Grianán," a group including Siobhán and Tommy Peoples, Niamh de Búrca, P.J. King, Martin Murray, Paul McSherry, John Maloney, and Pat Marsh (released in 1993), Crawford joined Moving Cloud in 1993, with whom he recorded two albums.

He joined one of Ireland's top traditional bands, Lúnasa, in 1997, replacing Michael McGoldrick. Crawford became the frontman for Lúnasa during their live performances. With the band he has recorded a number of albums, while he has also recorded solo albums and albums with other musicians.

He also tours with Martin Hayes and John Doyle as The Teetotallers.

According to the liner notes in Carrying the Tune, he plays "Mike Grinter flutes and whistles and Susato, Generation and Jonathan Sindt whistles."

== Discography ==
=== Solo ===
| Year | Album |
|---|---|
| 1995 | 'D' Flute Album |
| 2001 | In Good Company |
| 2007 | A Breath of Fresh Air |
| 2012 | Carrying the Tune |

=== As a member of ===
| Year | Album | Band/Artist(s) |
|---|---|---|
| 1993 | The Maid of Eirin | Grianán |
| 1995 | Raise The Rafters | Raise The Rafters |
| 1995 | Moving Cloud | Moving Cloud |
| 1998 | Foxglove | Moving Cloud |
| 1999 | Otherworld | Lunasa |
| 2001 | The Merry Sisters of Fate | Lunasa |
| 2003 | Redwood | Lunasa |
| 2004 | The Kinnitty Sessions | Lunasa |
| 2006 | Sé | Lunasa |
| 2008 | The Story So Far ... | Lunasa |
| 2009 | The Leitrim Equation | Lúnasa and other Irish musicians |
| 2010 | Lá Nua | Lunasa |
| 2018 | CAS | Lunasa |
| 2009 | On Common Ground | Cillian Vallely |
| 2017 | The Drunken Gaugers | The Drunken Gaugers |
| 2019 | Music and Mischief | Colin Farrell & Patrick Doocey |
