= Lá Nua (album) =

Studio album by Lúnasa
- Released: April 6, 2010
- Genre: Celtic
- Label: Lúnasa Records

Lúnasa chronology
The Story So Far... (2008)	Lá Nua (2010)	Lúnasa with the RTÉ Concert Orchestra (2013)

Professional ratings
Review scores
Source	Rating
Bright Young Folk	(favourable)
The Irish Echo	(favorable)
Irish Music Magazine	(favorable)

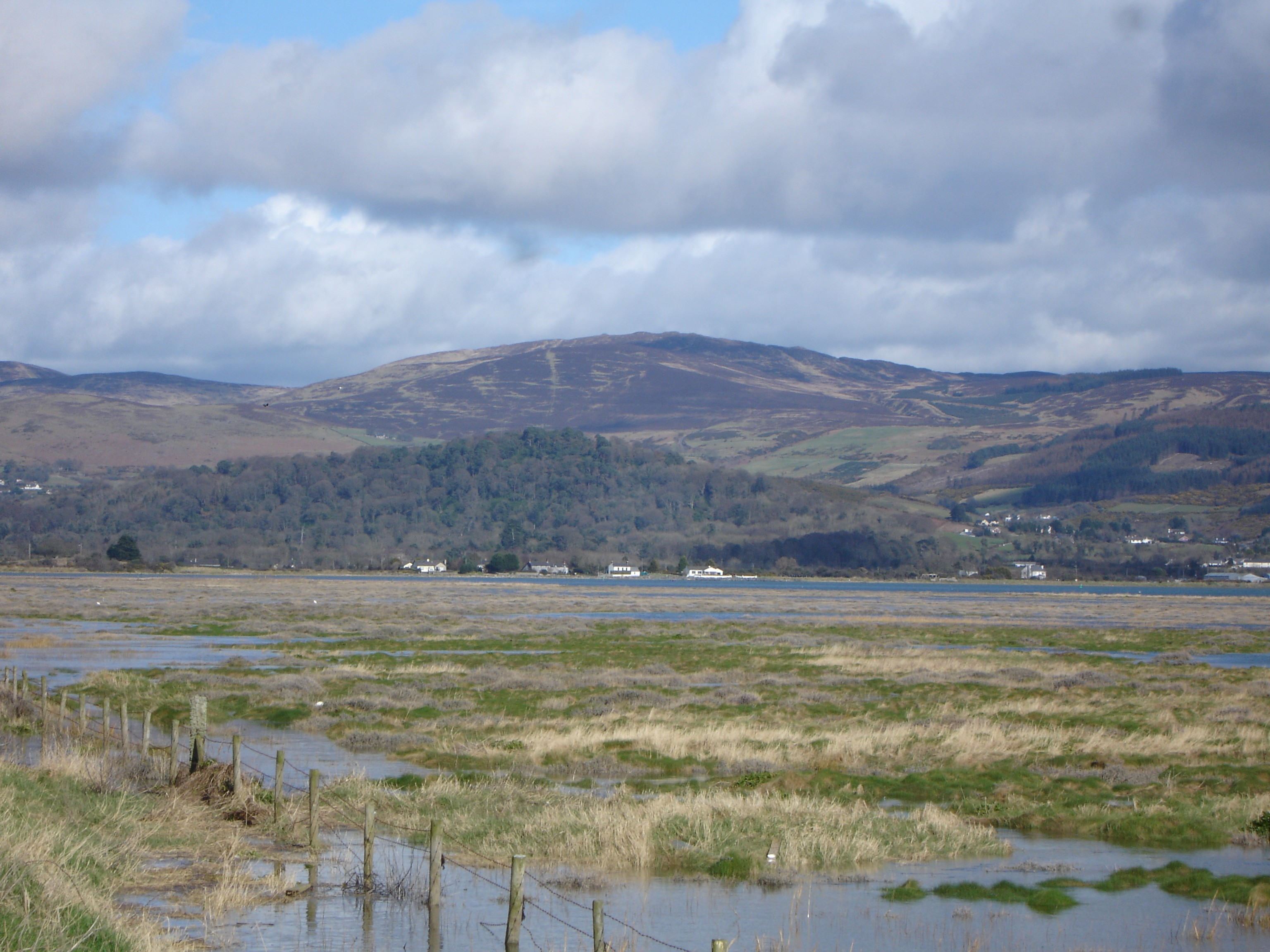
Lá Nua was recorded in the Cooley Mountains.

Lá Nua is an album by Lúnasa. It was released in 2010, and is the band's eighth major release. The album's name means "new day" in Irish.

It is the band's first album to be released on their own record label since their debut album, Lunasa. It was recorded in the Cooley Mountains.

Earlie Hutchner of American newspaper Irish Echo ranked the album at number 2 on his list of the "Top Ten Traditional Albums of 2010".

== Track listing ==
1. Ryestraw
  (The New Day March, Ryestraw, An Old Woman Would)
2. The Raven's Rock
  (The Raven's Rock, Ruby's Reel, The Beehive)
3. Tro Breizh
  (Tadin-Tinaketa, March des Charbonniers, Ridées Six Temps)
4. Fruitmarket Reels
  (Joe Tom's, Supernose, Buntata's Sgadán)
5. Doc Holliday's
  (East Village Days, Timmy's Place, Doc Holliday's)
6. Unapproved Road
  (Brady's, Connacht Heifers)
7. Island Lake
  (Tune for Dad, The Island Lake)
8. Snowball
  (Ciara's Dance, Burning Snowball, Road to Reel)
9. Pontevedra to Carcarosa
  (Marcha Processional du corpus de Pontevedra, Pasacorredoires 'de Mustad a Millares', Muñeira Carcarosa)
10. The Shore House
  (Inverness Country Reel, The Beauty Spot, The Shore House Reel)

For a detailed analysis of this album's contents see the Irishtune.info album page.
