= Tim Edey =

English musician and composer

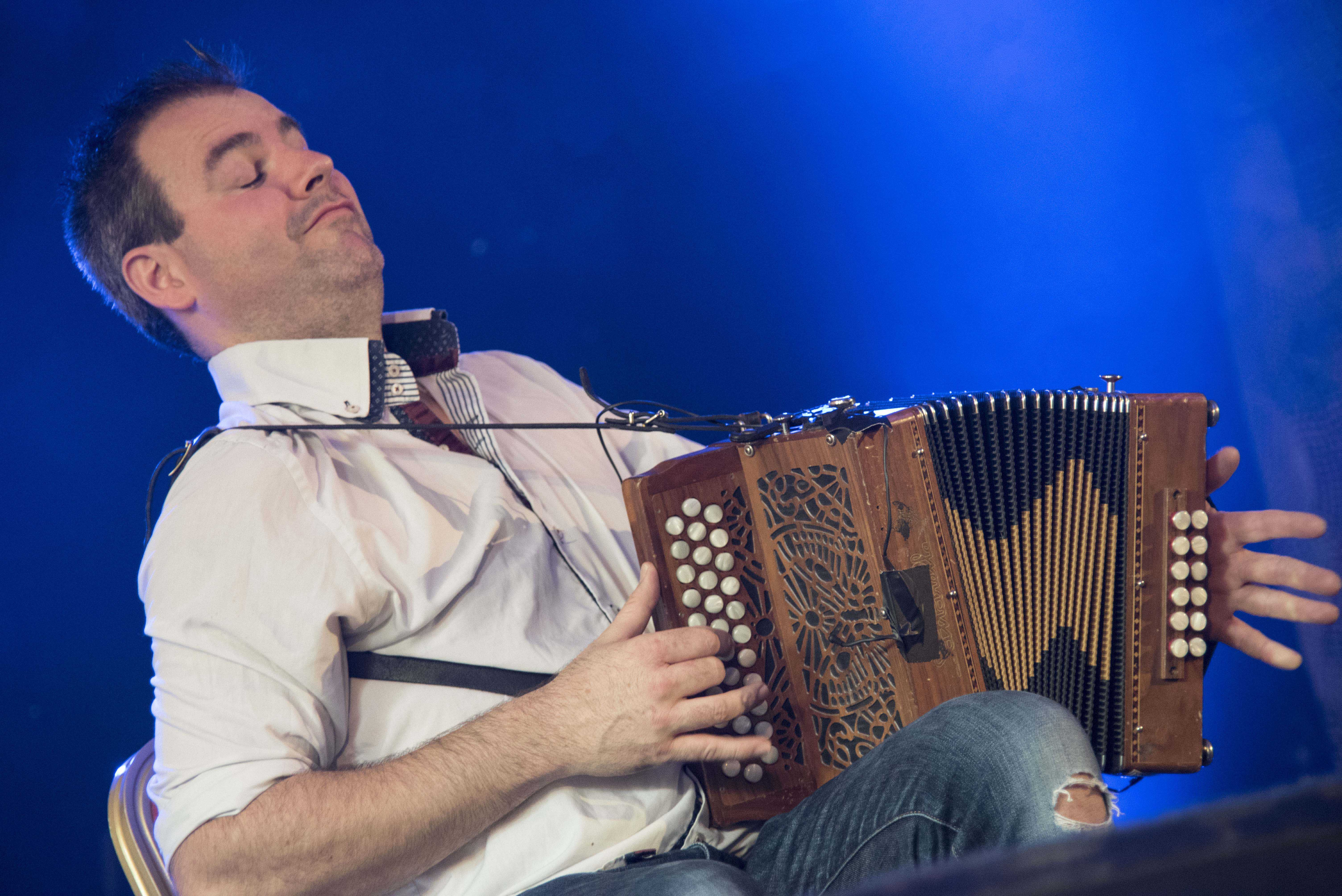
Edey performing at the Costa del Folk Festival

Tim Edey is an English multi-instrumentalist and composer who grew up in Broadstairs, Kent and is now based in Perthshire, Scotland. In 2012 he was Musician of the Year at the BBC Radio 2 Folk Awards and, with Brendan Power, Best Duo. He was awarded "Musician of the Year" in the 2020 MG Alba Scots Trad Music Awards.

Edey has been described as an "instrumental genius". As well as singing, he plays guitars, melodeon, piano and tin whistle. Wriggle and Writhe, his collaboration with New Zealand harmonica player Brendan Power, was, according to Colin Irwin, who reviewed it for the BBC, "one of the more colourful folk albums of 2011, from a pair of true virtuosos".

Edey toured with The Chieftains on their 2014 tour of the United States, their 2017 tour of Japan and was also a member of Lúnasa.

== Discography ==
=== Albums ===
- 2006 Irish Music From The Dingle Peninsula And Beyond
- 2010 Disgrace Notes (with Séamus Begley)
- 2010 The Collective
- 2011 Wriggle and Writhe (with Brendan Power)
- 2012 Sailing Over The 7th String
- 2016 How Do You Know?
- 2017 The Sleeping Tunes
- 2018 The Sleeping Tunes, Vol. 2
- 2018 Once (with J.P. Cormier)
- 2019 Being Myself
- 2020 The Sleeping Tunes, Vol. 3 : Lockdown Edition
- 2023 A Celtic Christmas

=== Singles ===
- 1999 "A Suite for Celts in Kent"
