= Trevor Hutchinson =

Northern Irish bass player

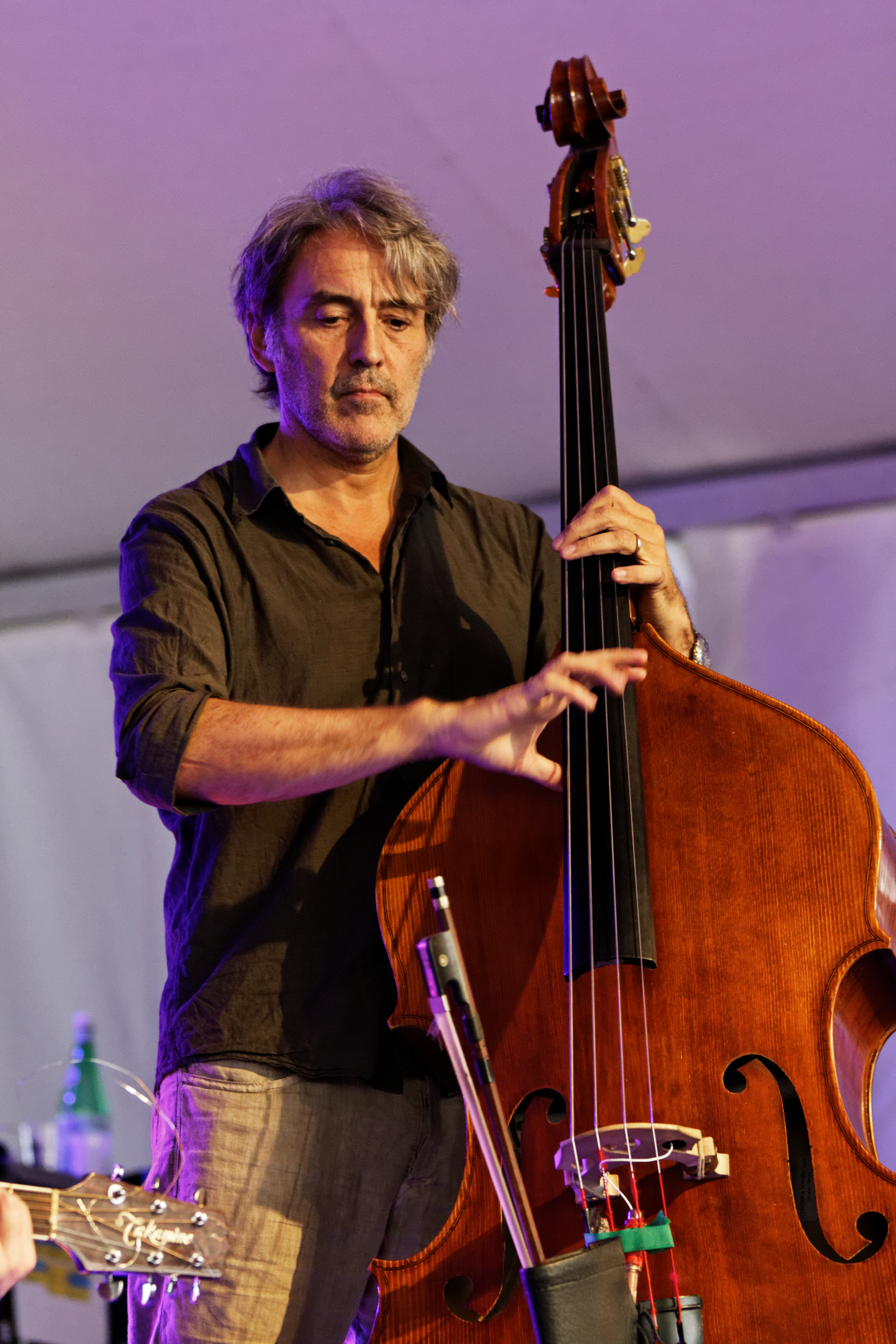
- Hutchinson with Lúnasa in 2013

Background information
- Born: Cookstown, County Tyrone, Northern Ireland
- Genres: Folk, celtic, jazz, folk rock
- Occupation: Bassist
- Years active: 1980s–present
- Member of: Lúnasa, Orchestra Macaroon
- Formerly of: The Waterboys

Trevor Hutchinson is a Northern Irish bass player and a founding member of Lúnasa.

Born in Cookstown, County Tyrone, in Northern Ireland, Hutchinson is known for his work as a double bass player within traditional Irish music. Prior to his work with Lúnasa, he played with numerous bands including the late 1980s lineup of The Waterboys and the early 1990s lineup of the Sharon Shannon Band. In addition to double bass, Hutchinson plays fretted and fretless bass guitar, bouzouki, mandola and cello. He also works as an engineer and record producer at his own Marguerite Studios in Dublin.

Other artists with whom Hutchinson has worked include Bumblebees, Carlos Núñez, Cathal McConnell, Dale Ann Bradley, De Danann, Dermot Byrne, Eoin Dillon, The Frames, Frank Harte, Frankie Lane, Gerry O'Beirne, Gerry O'Connor, Moving Cloud, Natalie Merchant, Eric Bibb, Máire Breatnach, Eileen Ivers, Grada, Joe McKenna, John Renbourn, Julie Fowlis, Luka Bloom, Mary Staunton, Matt Keating, Miriam Ingram, Niamh Parsons, Padraic MacMathuna, Sarah McQuaid, Susan McKeown, Ten Speed Racer and Sean Taylor.

== Discography ==
With Lúnasa

- Lúnasa (1999)
- Otherworld (1999)
- The Merry Sisters of Fate (2001)
- Redwood (2003)
- The Kinnitty Sessions (2004)
- Sé (2006)
- Lá Nua (2010)

With Colleen Raney

- Here This Is Home (2013)

With Sharon Shannon

- Sharon Shannon (1991)
- Out the Gap (1994)
- Each Little Thing (1997)

With The Waterboys

- Fisherman's Blues (1988)
- Room to Roam (1990)
- The Live Adventures of the Waterboys (1998)
- Fisherman's Box (2013 - retrospective box set)
- The Magnificent Seven - The Waterboys Fisherman's Blues/Room to Roam Band, 1989-90 (2021 - retrospective box set)
