= Seán Smyth =

Irish musician

Seán Smyth is an Irish musician from Strade, County Mayo, Ireland, where he is a national champion, having won senior titles on both Irish fiddle and tin whistle. He is perhaps best-known, however, for his years spent recording and performing with the band Lúnasa, along with flautist/whistler Kevin Crawford, uilleann piper/whistler Cillian Vallely, guitarist Donogh Hennessy and bassist Trevor Hutchinson.

== Early life ==
Seán Smyth was born in Strade, Co. Mayo, not far from Foxford, the hometown of Irish republican Michael Davitt. His sisters, Cora and Breda Smyth, are also famed fiddle players, with the latter also playing the tin whistle, as well. His sister Cora is perhaps best-known for performing alongside Máiread Nesbitt in Michael Flatley's original Lord of the Dance and Feet of Flames stage shows during the late 1990s-early 2000s.

Prior to Lúnasa fame, Smyth was awarded as an All-Ireland senior champion on both whistle and fiddle, at a young age. His first solo album, The Blue Fiddle, was released in 1993, and was subsequently named one of the "ten best albums of the year" by the Irish Echo.

== Career ==
After the release of his solo debut, Smyth toured in Scandinavia and Europe in support of the album, accompanied by Donogh Hennessey, Trevor Hutchinson, flute player Michael McGoldrick, and uilleann piper John McSherry. The group also toured in Australia in early 1997.

The five musicians eventually formed the Irish traditional music group Lúnasa in 1997, prior to Kevin Crawford replacing McGoldrick on woodwinds and McSherry being replaced by Cillian Vallely on pipes. Lúnasa spent two decades touring internationally and recording a number of albums.

Other recordings on which Smyth appears include the compilation album Ceol Tigh Neachtain (1989), Music at Matt Molloy's (1992), Brendan O'Regan's A Wind of Change (1992), Alan Kelly's Out of the Blue (1997) and Mosaic (1999), and Dónal Lunny's Coolfin (1998).
