= Lúnasa (band) =

Irish band

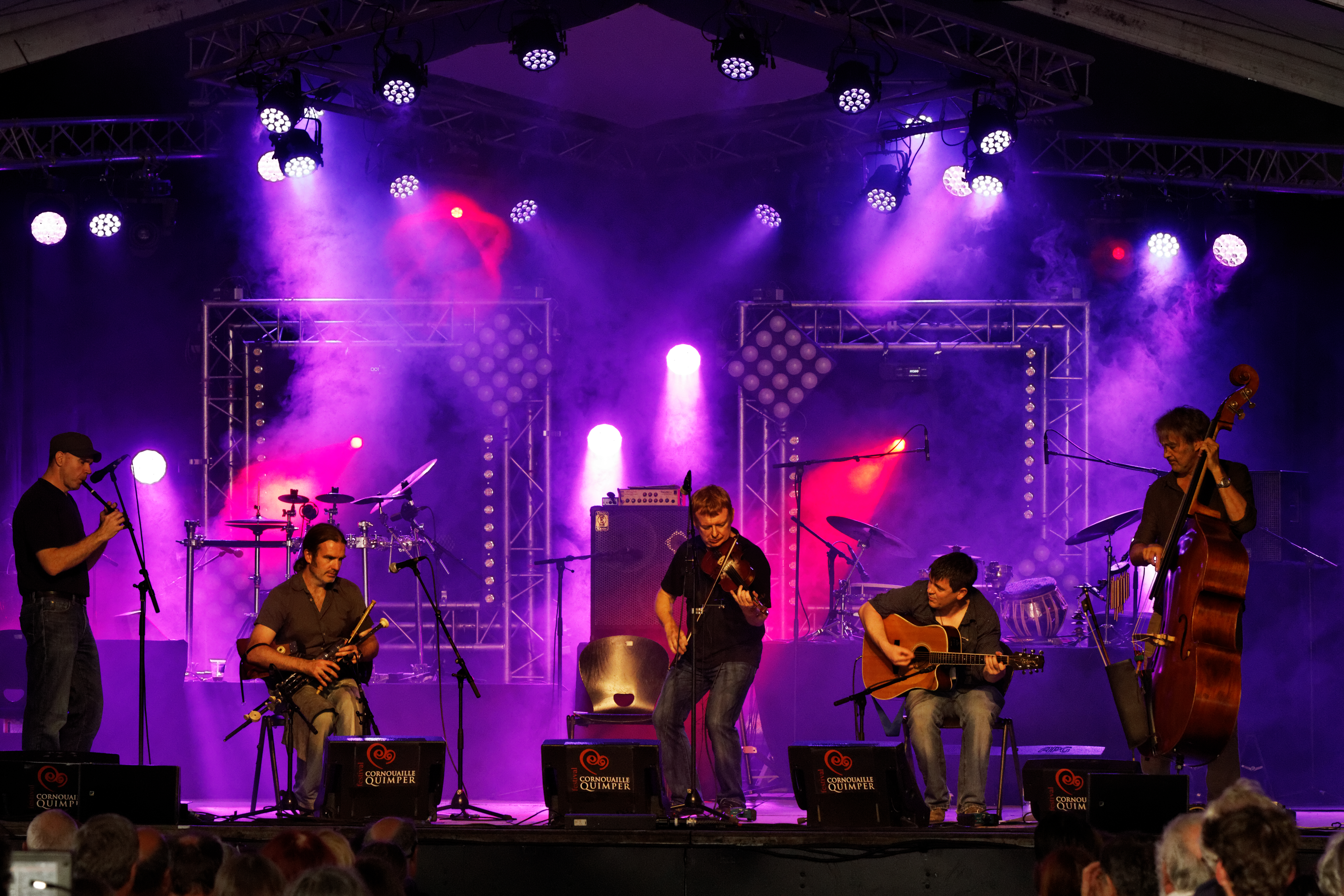
- Lúnasa performing at the Cornouaille Festival in Quimper, Brittany, France

Background information
- Origin: Ireland
- Genres: Irish folk, Celtic
- Years active: 1997–present
- Labels: Lúnasa, Compass, Green Linnet
- Members: Sean Smyth; Kevin Crawford; Trevor Hutchinson; Cillian Vallely; Ed Boyd; Colin Farrell; Patrick Doocey
- Past members: Tim Edey; Donogh Hennessy; Michael McGoldrick; John McSherry; Paul Meehan
- Website: www.lunasamusic.com

Lúnasa is a traditional Irish music group, named after Lughnasadh, an ancient harvest festival. They tour and perform internationally, and have recorded a number of albums of both traditional and contemporary Irish instrumental music.

== History ==
Lúnasa was founded in 1997 when Sean Smyth, John McSherry and Steve Cooney teamed up to tour Smyth's solo album, The Blue Fiddle. They called in Mike McGoldrick, a friend of McSherry's, and toured as a four-piece. As the band was taking off, Cooney bowed out.

In the meantime, Smyth was touring in Scandinavia with the rhythmical duo Donogh Hennessy and Trevor Hutchinson, and recruited them to join the band. Calling themselves Lúnasa, they began performing and touring; the first album, Lúnasa, was recorded while the group was on tour in 1998 and released to critical acclaim.

McGoldrick and McSherry were becoming increasingly busy with other projects and left the band. Kevin Crawford then joined the band and various other pipers stepped in for McSherry. McSherry and McGoldrick were again called upon to record the second album, Otherworld. It was after this album that piper Cillian Vallely joined the band.

In 1999, the group signed a three-year contract with Green Linnet Records, and that October released their second album, Otherworld. In December 2000, they appeared on A Thistle and Shamrock Christmas Ceilidh. In 2002, their highly acclaimed album The Merry Sisters of Fate was released; this was followed by 2003's Redwood, which was released late due to a feud with the label. Ultimately the band terminated their contract.

In 2004, Lúnasa signed up with Compass Records and recorded The Kinnitty Sessions before a live audience in Kinnitty Castle, County Offaly. That same year, Donogh Hennessy left the group, being replaced by Tim Edey and Paul Meehan who each played half the tracks on the album Sé. Tim Edey left shortly after, and Paul Meehan became the band's guitarist.

In 2008, the band released a compilation album, Lúnasa: The Story So Far, with representative recordings from the band's first eleven years.

Released in April 2010, the band's following album, Lá Nua, was the first release on the band's own record label, Lúnasa Records. That same month, the band also performed on the Natalie Merchant album Leave Your Sleep. Meehan left the group in late 2011 and was replaced by Ed Boyd.

In 2018, the band released the album CAS which features guest vocalists Natalie Merchant, Daoirí Farrell, Tim O'Brien, Eric Bibb, and Mary Chapin Carpenter.

The group has toured and performed in the Americas, Europe, Asia and Australia.

== Line-up ==
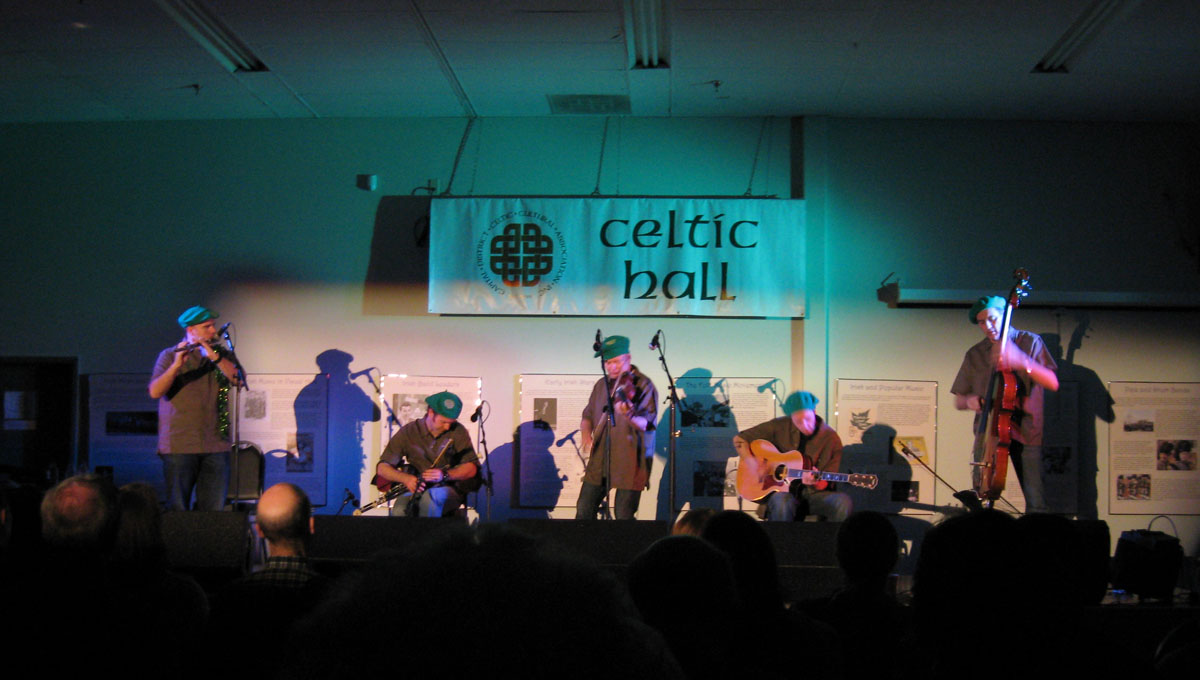
Lúnasa performing at the Celtic Hall in East Greenbush, New York

=== Current members ===
- Seán Smyth – Fiddle, whistles
- Kevin Crawford – Flutes, whistles
- Trevor Hutchinson – Double bass
- Cillian Vallely – Uilleann pipes, whistles
- Ed Boyd – Guitar
- Colin Farrell – Fiddle, whistles
- Patrick Doocey – Guitar

=== Former members ===
- Tim Edey – guitar
- Donogh Hennessy – guitar
- Michael McGoldrick – Uilleann pipes, flute, whistle
- John McSherry – Uilleann pipes
- Paul Meehan – Guitar, bouzouki, mandolin

== Discography ==
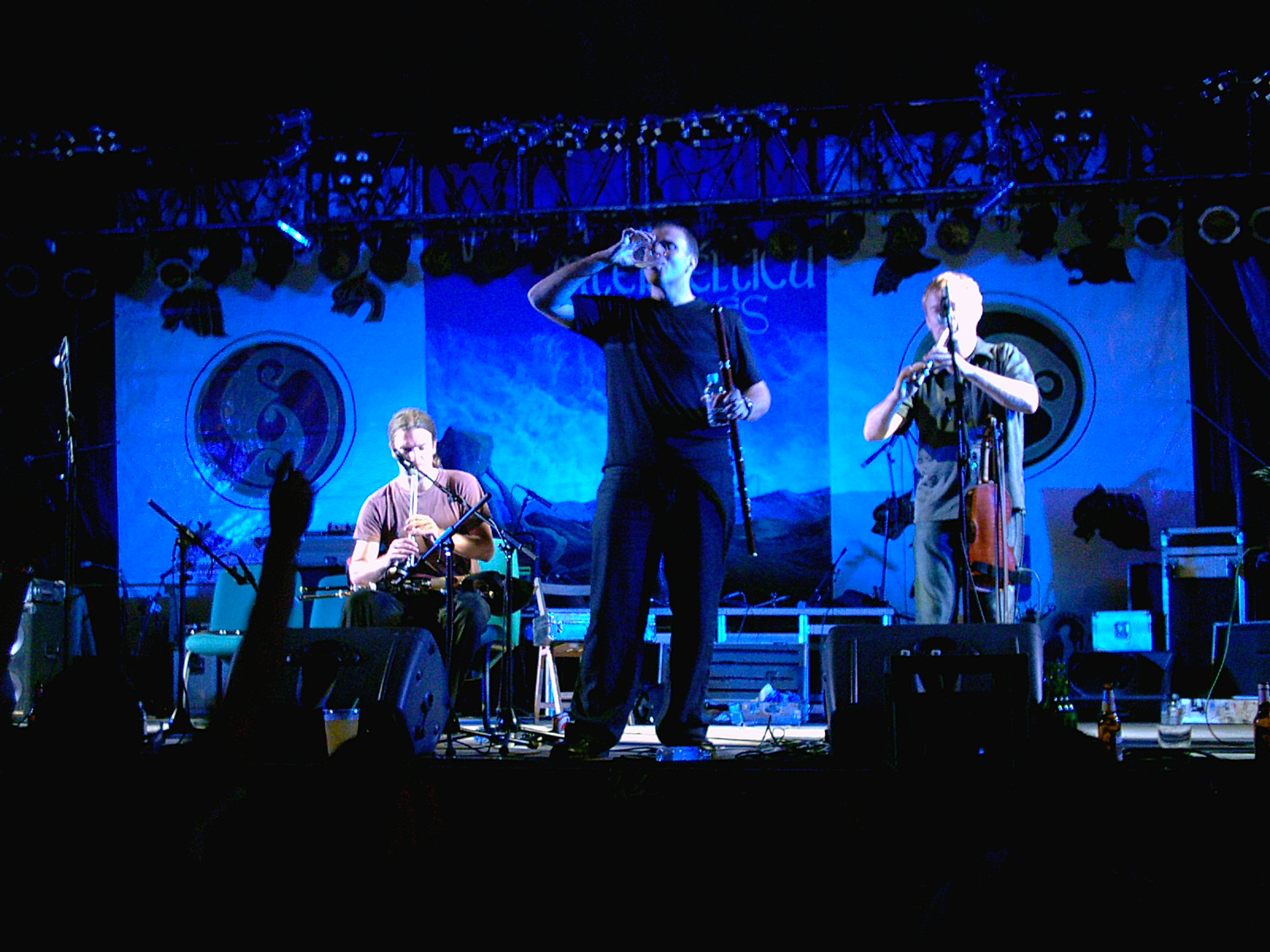
Lúnasa performs at Interceltic Festival of Avilés (Asturias) in July 2004.

=== Studio albums ===
- Lúnasa (1998)
- Otherworld (1999)
- The Merry Sisters of Fate (2001)
- Redwood (2003)
- The Kinnitty Sessions (2004)
- Sé (2006)
- Lá Nua (2010)
- CAS (2018)

=== Live albums ===
- Lúnasa with the RTÉ Concert Orchestra (2013)
- Live in Kyoto (2024)

=== Compilation albums ===
- The Rough Guide to Irish Music (1996)
- The Story So Far... (2008)
- The Leitrim Equation featuring Lúnasa (2009) (features Lúnasa and other Irish musicians)
