= Lúnasa (album) =

Live album by Lúnasa
- Released: 16 January 1998, 2001 (re-release)
- Recorded: October 1997
- Genre: Celtic
- Length: 46:34 / 51:29
- Label: Compass Records

Lúnasa chronology
Lúnasa (1998)	'Otherworld' (1999)

Professional ratings
Review scores
Source	Rating
Allmusic	link

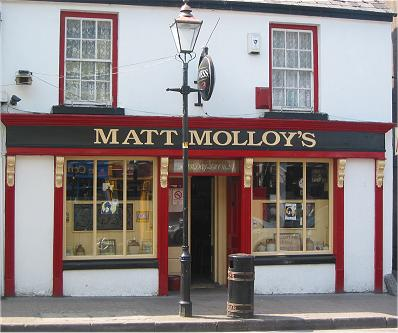
Matt Molloy's, Westport, County Mayo, where part of Lúnasa was recorded.

Lúnasa is an album by Lúnasa that was released twice, first in 1998 on their own label, and again in 2001 on Compass Records. It was the band's first major release. The piping on the album was done by John McSherry, as Cillian Vallely was not part of the group at the time.

The first release of the album contained eleven tracks, named for the months in the Irish calendar. 'Lúnasa', the word for August, was omitted. A twelfth (live) track was added for the 2001 re-release.

Wayne Sheehy of Hothouse Flowers is a fan of the album, once commenting that he "loves" it.

== Track listing ==
1. Eanáir
  (Lord Mayo, Gavotte, The Maids Of Mt. Cisco)
2. Feabhra
  (An Erc'h War An Enezeg (Snow On The Island), Brenda Stubbert's, Thunderhead)
3. Márta
  (The Noonday Feast, The Waterbed, Sully's No. 6)
4. Aibreann
  (The Last Pint)
5. Bealtaine
  (Hogties, Promenade, Gan Ainm)
6. Meitheamh
  (Fleur De Mandragore, The Ashplant, Siobhan O'Donnell's)
7. Iúil
  (Frailock)
8. Meán Fómhair
  (Colonel Frazer)
9. Deireadh Fómhair
  (Terry 'Cuz' Teehan's, Alice's)
10. Mí Na Samhna
  (Jizaique, Baby Rory's, Dub)
11. Mí Na Nollag
  (The Kerfuntan, Eddie Kelly's, Give Us A Drink Of Water)
12. Jacky Molard's / The Hunter's Purse (live recording) (bonus track on 2001 version)

For a detailed analysis of this album's contents see the Irishtune.info album page.

== Personnel ==
- Michael McGoldrick – flute, low whistle
- John McSherry – low whistle, uilleann pipes
- Donogh Hennessy – guitar
- Seán Smyth – fiddle, swanee (slide whistle)
- Trevor Hutchinson – double bass, mixing
- Joe Chester – Recorded by and mixing
- Aiden Foley – mastering
- Earle Hitchner – liner Notes
- Naoimh Ingram – cover design
- Griffin Norman – packaging
