= Sé (album) =

Studio album by Lúnasa
- Released: February 21, 2006
- Genre: Celtic
- Length: 47:48
- Label: Compass

Lúnasa chronology
The Kinnitty Sessions (2004)	Sé (2006)	The Story So Far... (2008)

Professional ratings
Review scores
Source	Rating
Allmusic	link

Sé (Irish pronunciation: [ʃeː]) is an album by Lúnasa. It was released in 2006 on Compass Records, and is the band's sixth major release. The album's name means 'six' in Irish.

The Living Tradition observed "Scottish, Breton and Spanish piping influences joining tunes in 9/8 and 7/8, and plenty of slow jigs and reels: in short, all the fabulous variety and richness which is Lúnasa's hallmark. Tracks like 'Black River' and 'Boy in the Boat', including Iain Kirkpatrick's great reel 'The Boys of Ballivanich', are familiar from recent concert tours, and all the more welcome for that."

== Track listing ==
1. The Cullybacky Hop
  (Mike Hobin's, Emmett's Hedgehog, Dunrobin Castle)
2. Leckan Mór
  (Kalyana, Emer Maycock, Above in the Garret, Leckan Mór)
3. Absent Friends
  (Absent Friends, Ivory Lady)
4. Loophead
  (Bolton St., The Millstream, Loophead Lighthouse)
5. Midnight in Avilés
  (N'Alcordanza, Soig's Plinn, Skolvan Doubl Plinn)
6. The Dingle Berries
  (The Hop, Padraig O'Keefe's, Nessa The Mover, Trip To Dingle)
7. Black River
  (Across the Black River, Iain MacDonald's)
8. Road to Barga
  (Timmy Collins', Road to Barga)
9. Two of a Kind
  (Showacho, Portobello)
10. Glentrasna
11. Boy in the Boat
  (The Ballivanich, The Boy In The Boat, The Stone Of Destiny)

For a detailed analysis of this album's contents see the Irishtune.info album page.
