= The Kinnitty Sessions =

Live album by Lúnasa
- Released: March 2, 2004
- Recorded: December 2003
- Venue: Kinnitty Castle
- Genre: Celtic
- Length: 40:24
- Label: Compass Records

Lúnasa chronology
Redwood (2003)	The Kinnitty Sessions (2004)	Sé (2006)

Professional ratings
Review scores
Source	Rating
Allmusic	4/5 stars
The Scotsman	4/5 stars

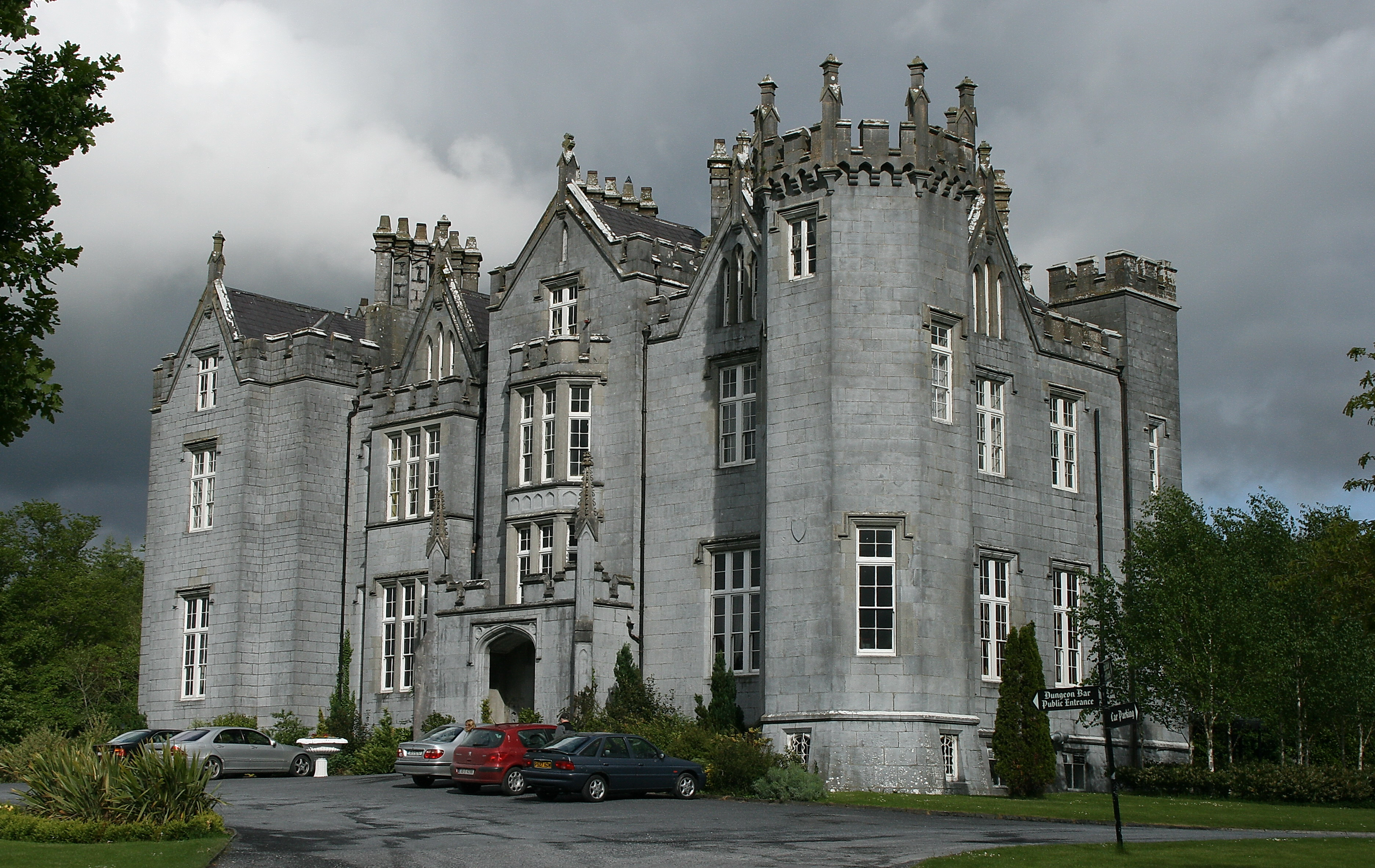
Kinnitty Castle, where the album as recorded.

The Kinnitty Sessions is an album by Lúnasa that was released in 2004 on Compass Records. It is their fifth major release, and their first on Compass Records. The album was recorded in Kinnitty Castle before a small audience. This was Donogh Hennessy's last album with Lúnasa.

The album was named Best Traditional Album by Irish Music Magazine in 2005, and was nominated for "Folk Album of the Year" at the 2004 BBC Radio 2 Folk Awards.

== Track listing ==
1. Stolen Purse
  (Stolen Purse, An Sioda, Brendan McMahon's Reel)
2. Ballyogan
  (Dans Fisel, Ballyogan)
3. Punch
  (Scottish Concerto Strathspey, Trip to Windsor, Punch in the Dark)
4. The Dimmers
  (Jerry O'Sullivan's, The Dimmers)
5. Island Paddy
  (Rathlin Island, Sporting Paddy)
6. Sean in the Fog
  (Easter Sunday, Come Back With My Bloody Car, Sean Sa Cheo)
7. Bulgarian Rock
  (Split Rock, Djinovsko Horo)
8. The Wounded Hussar
9. The Walrus
  (The Four Courts, Michael Kennedy's Reel)
10. Maids in the Kitchen
  (Mrs. O'Sullivan's Jig, Chloe's Passion)
11. Tie the Bonnet
  (The Pullet, Hull's Reel, Tie the Bonnet)

For a detailed analysis of this album's contents see the Irishtune.info album page.
