= The Irish Echo =

Irish-American newspaper based in Manhattan in the United States

- Type: Weekly newspaper
- Owner: Belfast Media Group
- Founded: 1928; 97 years ago
- Language: English
- City: New York City
- Country: United States
- Website: irishecho.com

The Irish Echo is a weekly Irish-American newspaper based in Manhattan.

== History ==
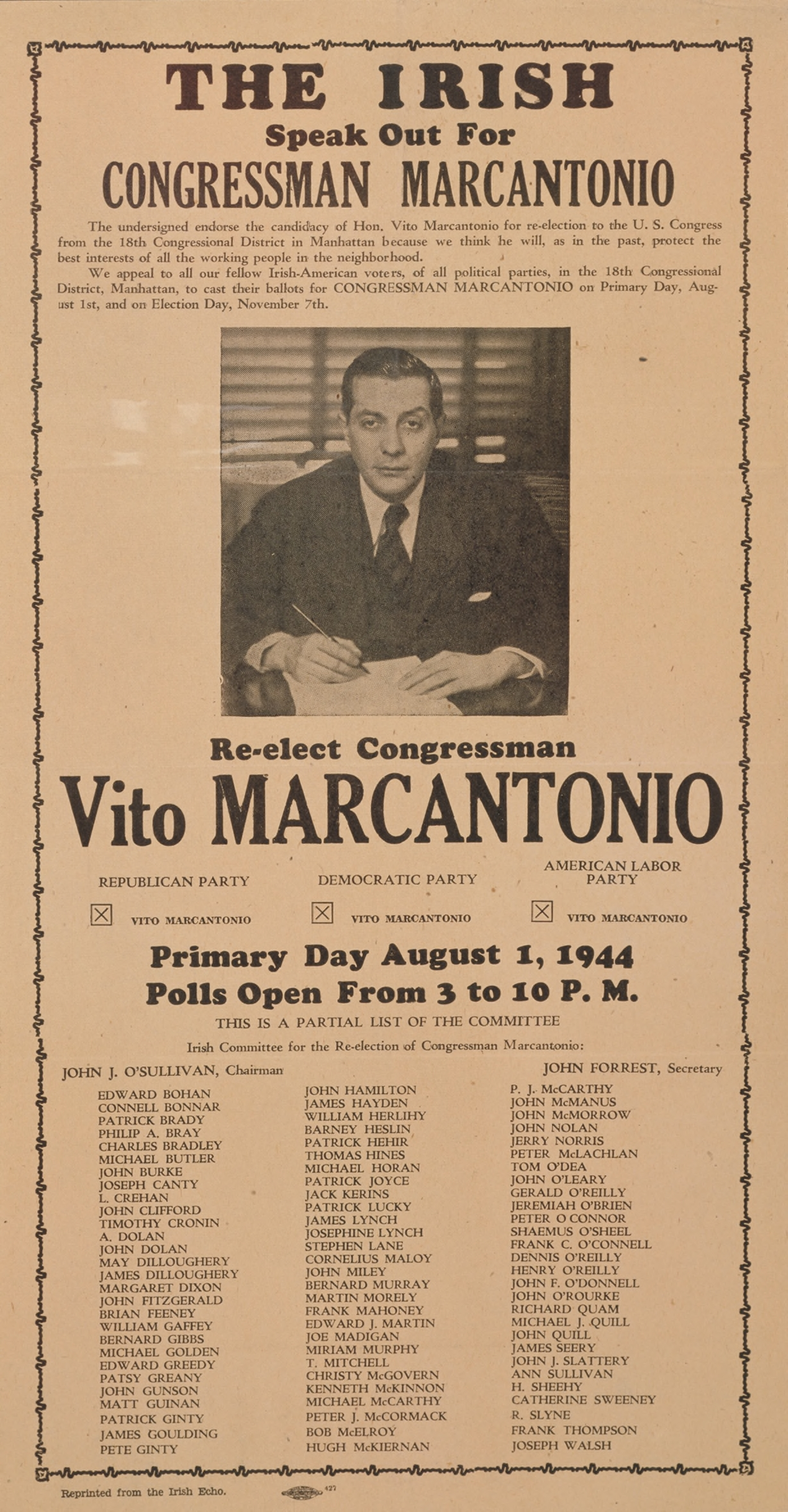
Campaign poster for Congressman Vito Marcantonio reprinted from the Echo, 1944

Founded in 1928, it bills itself as "the USA's most widely read Irish-American newspaper", with a circulation of about 60,000 and a readership of about 100,000. The newspaper is printed in both the United States and Ireland and has "newsstand presence in all major American and Irish cities". Irish writers John B. Keane, Brian Friel, and Tom Caulfield all contributed to the paper in the past. In 2007, Máirtín Ó Muilleoir, Irish businessman and publisher of the Andersonstown News, purchased the paper.

== Events ==
Events associated with The Irish Echo include:

- "Top 40 under 40 Irish and Irish Americans" - This event is a celebration of Irish and Irish Americans who have distinguished themselves in their respective fields of work before reaching the age of forty. The Top 40 Under 40 will spotlight the up-and-coming leaders of Irish America from around the nation who work in a variety of fields and occupations.
- "Law and Order Awards" - An annual event which celebrates men and women in law enforcement.
- "Community Champion Awards" - Awards which "are open to people from all walks of life".
- "The First Responder Awards" - Awards for those in Fire and EMS departments around the US, and are nominated by the public.
