= List of musical supergroups =

Musical acts composed of notable performers

This is a list of supergroups, music groups whose members are already successful as solo artists or as part of other groups. Usually used in the context of rock bands such as Audioslave and Chickenfoot, the term has also been applied to groups based in other musical genres such as the Three Tenors in Opera, as well as in R&B/Pop with such popular acts like Bell Biv DeVoe (BBD), LSG & TGT. The term is applied in hip-hop to collaborations such as The Firm, Westside Connection, Method Man & Redman, Kids See Ghosts, and Mount Westmore.

Supergroups are sometimes formed as side projects and thus not intended to be permanent, while other times they can become the primary project of the members' careers. Charity supergroups, where prominent musicians perform or record together in support of a particular cause, have been common since the 1980s.

== List of groups ==
=== Groups with numerous albums and/or live appearances ===
This is a list of notable supergroups that have performed or recorded more than a single song or album or live shows together.

Founded	Band or project name	Members	Albums or singles	Notes	Ref.
1960	The Four Seasons	Frankie Valli (The Four Lovers); Bob Gaudio (The Royal Teens); Tommy DeVito (The Four Lovers); Charles Calello; Nick Massi replaced Calello from late 1960 to September 1965; Demetri Callas (The Bad Boys and Flavor); Don Ciccone (The Critters); John Paiva (The Happenings); Jerry Corbetta (Sugarloaf); Robby Robinson	Several studio albums; over 100 singles	Valli the only constant performer	
1965	Steampacket	Long John Baldry (Blues Incorporated, The Hoochie Coochie Men); Rod Stewart (The Ray Davies Quartet, Jimmy Powell and the Five Dimensions); Julie Driscoll (Trinity); Brian Auger (Trinity); Vic Briggs (The Echoes, Trinity); Richard Brown (Trinity); Micky Waller (Cyril Davies R&B All-Stars, The Flee-Rekkers)	Steampacket; The First Supergroup		
1966	Cream	Eric Clapton (The Yardbirds, John Mayall & the Bluesbreakers); Jack Bruce (Graham Bond Organisation, Manfred Mann); Ginger Baker (The Graham Bond Organisation)	Fresh Cream (1966); Disraeli Gears (1967); Wheels of Fire (1968); Goodbye (1969)		
1966	The Soul Clan	Solomon Burke (solo); Otis Redding (solo); Wilson Pickett (The Falcons, solo); Don Covay (solo); Joe Tex (solo); Arthur Conley replaced Redding in 1967; Ben E. King (The Drifters, solo) replaced Pickett in 1967	The Soul Clan		
1968	Crosby, Stills, Nash & Young	David Crosby (The Byrds); Stephen Stills (Buffalo Springfield); Graham Nash (The Hollies); Neil Young (Buffalo Springfield, Crazy Horse); John Barbata (The Turtles) joined in late 1968, but was never a named partner	Crosby, Stills & Nash (1969); Déjà Vu (1970); CSN (1977); Daylight Again (1982); American Dream (1988); Live It Up (1990); After the Storm (1994); Looking Forward (1999); three live albums		
1968	Honey Cone	Edna Wright (The Blossoms); Carolyn Willis (The Girlfriends); Shelly Clark (The Ikettes)	Take Me with You (1970); Sweet Replies (1971); Soulful Tapestry (1971); Love, Peace & Soul (1972)		
1969	Blind Faith	Eric Clapton (The Yardbirds, John Mayall & the Bluesbreakers, Cream); Ginger Baker (Graham Bond Organisation, Cream); Steve Winwood (Traffic, The Spencer Davis Group); Ric Grech (Family)	Blind Faith (1969)		
1969	Cactus	Jim McCarty (The Detroit Wheels, Buddy Miles); Rusty Day (The Amboy Dukes); Tim Bogert (Vanilla Fudge); Carmine Appice (Vanilla Fudge)			
1969	Ginger Baker's Air Force	Ginger Baker (Cream, Graham Bond Organisation, Blind Faith); Steve Winwood (Traffic, Blind Faith); Ric Grech (Family, Blind Faith); Graham Bond (Graham Bond Organisation); Denny Laine (The Moody Blues)	Ginger Baker's Air Force (1970); Ginger Baker's Air Force 2 (1970)		
1969	Grand Funk Railroad	Mark Farner (Terry Knight and the Pack); Don Brewer (Terry Knight and the Pack); Mel Schacher (? and the Mysterians)	On Time (1969); Grand Funk (1969); Closer to Home (1970); Survival (1971); E Pluribus Funk (1971); Phoenix (1972); We're an American Band (1973); Shinin' On (1974); All the Girls in the World Beware!!! (1974); Born to Die (1976); Good Singin', Good Playin' (1976); Grand Funk Lives (1981); What's Funk? (1983)		
1969	Humble Pie	Steve Marriott (Small Faces); Peter Frampton (The Herd); Greg Ridley (Spooky Tooth); Clem Clempson (Colosseum); Jerry Shirley (Apostolic Intervention)	Humble Pie (1970); Smokin' (1973)		
1970	Emerson, Lake & Palmer	Keith Emerson (The Nice); Greg Lake (The Gods, King Crimson); Carl Palmer (Atomic Rooster, The Crazy World of Arthur Brown)	Emerson, Lake & Palmer; Tarkus; Trilogy; Brain Salad Surgery		
1970	The Plastic Ono Band	John Lennon (The Beatles); Yoko Ono; Eric Clapton (The Yardbirds, John Mayall & the Bluesbreakers, Cream, The Dirty Mac, Blind Faith); George Harrison (The Beatles); Klaus Voormann (Manfred Mann); Alan White (later of Yes); Ringo Starr (The Beatles); Keith Moon (The Who)	Live Peace in Toronto 1969; John Lennon/Plastic Ono Band; Yoko Ono/Plastic Ono Band; Sometime In New York City		
1970	Derek and the Dominos	Eric Clapton (The Yardbirds, John Mayall & the Bluesbreakers, Cream); Bobby Whitlock (Delaney and Bonnie); Carl Radle (Delaney and Bonnie); Jim Gordon (Delaney and Bonnie); Duane Allman (The Allman Brothers Band)	Layla and Other Assorted Love Songs (1970)		
1970	Planet Earth Rock and Roll Orchestra	Paul Kantner (Jefferson Airplane); Grace Slick (Jefferson Airplane); Jerry Garcia (Grateful Dead); David Crosby (The Byrds, Crosby, Stills, Nash & Young); Peter Kaukonen; Jack Casady (Jefferson Airplane); Harvey Brooks; Joey Covington (Jefferson Airplane); Bill Kreutzmann (Grateful Dead); Graham Nash (The Hollies, Crosby, Stills, Nash & Young); Mickey Hart (Grateful Dead); David Freiberg (Jefferson Airplane); Phill Sawyer	Blows Against the Empire (1970); Planet Earth Rock and Roll Orchestra (1983)	aka Jefferson Starship, referring only to the ad hoc lineup assembled to record Blows Against the Empire, not the Jefferson Starship lineup	
1971	Captain Beyond	Rod Evans (Deep Purple); Larry "Rhino" Reinhardt (Iron Butterfly); Lee Dorman (Iron Butterfly); Bobby Caldwell (Johnny Winter)	Captain Beyond; Sufficiently Breathless; Far Beyond a Distant Sun - Live Arlington, Texas		
1971	Locomotiv GT	Tamás Barta (Syconor, Syrius, Hungária); Károly Frenreisz (Metro); József Laux (Omega); Gábor Presser (Omega)		Formed after a ballot to choose the "Hungarian dream band".	
1972	ABBA	Agnetha Fältskog (solo); Björn Ulvaeus (Hootenanny Singers); Benny Andersson (The Hep Stars); Anni-Frid "Frida" Lyngstad (solo)	Ring Ring; Waterloo; ABBA; Arrival	Started recording in 1972 as Björn & Benny, Agnetha & Anni-Frid (Frida), band name was changed to ABBA, two years later.	
1972	Beck, Bogert & Appice	Jeff Beck (The Yardbirds, The Jeff Beck Group); Tim Bogert (Vanilla Fudge, Cactus); Carmine Appice (Vanilla Fudge, Cactus)			
1972	West, Bruce and Laing	Leslie West (Mountain, solo); Jack Bruce (Cream, The Tony Williams Lifetime, solo); Corky Laing (David Rea, Mountain)			
1972	10cc	Neil Sedaka (The Tokens, solo); Graham Gouldman (Hotlegs, The Mindbenders); Eric Stewart (The Mindbenders, Hotlegs, Doctor Father); Kevin Godley (Hotlegs, Doctor Father); Lol Creme (Hotlegs, Doctor Father); Paul Burgess – replaced Sedaka in 1973	11 studio albums; 35 singles		
1972	Eagles	Don Henley (Linda Ronstadt); Glenn Frey (Linda Ronstadt, Longbranch Pennywhistle); Bernie Leadon (Dillard & Clark, The Flying Burrito Brothers); Randy Meisner (Poco); Joe Walsh (James Gang, Barnstorm) – replaced Bernie Leadon in 1975	Eagles; Desperado; Hotel California; and more		
1973	Journey	Gregg Rolie (Santana); Neal Schon (Santana); George Tickner (Frumious Bandersnatch); Ross Valory (Steve Miller Band); Prairie Prince (The Tubes); Aynsley Dunbar (The Jeff Beck Group, Frank Zappa, David Bowie) – replaced Prince in 1974	Journey; Look into the Future; Next; and more		
1973	Bad Company	Paul Rodgers (Free); Mick Ralphs (Mott the Hoople); Boz Burrell (King Crimson, solo); Simon Kirke (Free)	Bad Company; Straight Shooter; Run With the Pack; and more		
1974	Armageddon	Bobby Caldwell (Johnny Winter, Captain Beyond); Louis Cennamo (Renaissance, Colosseum, Steamhammer); Martin Pugh (Steamhammer); Keith Relf (The Yardbirds, Renaissance)			
1975	KGB	Michael Bloomfield (Paul Butterfield Blues Band, Electric Flag); Ric Grech (Family, Blind Faith, Ginger Baker's Air Force); Carmine Appice (Vanilla Fudge, Cactus, Beck, Bogert & Appice); Barry Goldberg (Electric Flag); Ray Louis Kennedy (solo)	KGB (1976); Motion (1976)		
1975	Sonic's Rendezvous Band	Fred "Sonic" Smith (MC5); Scott Morgan (The Rationals); Scott Asheton (The Stooges); Gary Rassmussen (The Up)	Sweet Nothing (1999); City Slang (2000); Sonic's Rendezvous Band (Box Set) (2006); Masonic Temple, Detroit 1978 (2007)		
1975	Little River Band	Glenn Shorrock (The Twilights, Axiom); Graeham Goble (Mississippi); Beeb Birtles (Zoot, Mississippi); Derek Pellicci (Mississippi); Ric Formosa; Roger McLachlan	Little River Band; After Hours; Diamantina Cocktail; Sleeper Catcher, First Under the Wire; Time Exposure; and more		
1975	Little River Band	John Farnham (solo) replaced Shorrock as lead singer in 1982	Little River Band; After Hours; Diamantina Cocktail; Sleeper Catcher, First Under the Wire; Time Exposure; and more		
1976	Paice Ashton Lord	Ian Paice (Deep Purple, Green Bullfrog); Tony Ashton (Ashton, Gardner and Dyke, Family, Green Bullfrog); Jon Lord (Deep Purple)	Malice in Wonderland (1977)		
1977	U.K.	John Wetton (Family, King Crimson, Uriah Heep); Allan Holdsworth (Igginbottom, Tempest, Soft Machine); Eddie Jobson (Curved Air, Roxy Music, Frank Zappa, 801); Bill Bruford (Yes, King Crimson); Terry Bozzio (Frank Zappa) – replaced Bruford in 1978	U.K. (1978); Danger Money (1979)		
1978	Serú Girán	Charly García (Sui Generis, La Máquina de Hacer Pájaros); David Lebón (Pescado Rabioso, Pappo's Blues); Pedro Aznar (Alas); Oscar Moro (Los Gatos)	Serú Giran; La grasa de las capitales, Bicicleta; and more		
1978	Yellow Magic Orchestra	Haruomi Hosono (Happy End); Ryuichi Sakamoto (solo); Yukihiro Takahashi (Sadistic Mika Band)	Yellow Magic Orchestra; Solid State Survivor; X∞Multiplies; BGM; Technodelic; Naughty Boys; Service; Technodon		
1979	Sky	John Williams (solo); Francis Monkman (Curved Air); Herbie Flowers (Blue Mink, CCS, T. Rex); Kevin Peek (James Taylor Move, Quartet, solo); Tristan Fry (L.P.O., Fires of London, London Sinfonietta)	8 studio albums; 2 live albums; 4 compilation albums; 2 singles		
1980	The (Notorious) Cherry Bombs	Rodney Crowell (Emmylou Harris and the Hot Band); Vince Gill (Pure Prairie League, solo); Emory Gordy Jr. (Emmylou Harris and the Hot Band, TCB Band); Richard Bennett (Neil Diamond); Tony Brown; Larrie Londin (The Funk Brothers, TCB Band)	The Notorious Cherry Bombs (2004)		
1981	Asia	John Wetton (Family, King Crimson, Uriah Heep); Steve Howe (Yes); Carl Palmer (Atomic Rooster, The Crazy World of Arthur Brown, Emerson, Lake & Palmer); Geoff Downes (The Buggles, Yes)	Asia, (1982); Alpha (1983); Phoenix (2008); Omega (2010); XXX (2012)		
1981	B. L. T.	Jack Bruce (Cream, The Tony Williams Lifetime, West, Bruce and Laing, solo); Bill Lordan (Gypsy, Sly and the Family Stone, Robin Trower); Robin Trower (Procol Harum, solo)			
1981	The Golden Palominos	Anton Fier; Bill Laswell; Nicky Skopelitis; Amanda Kramer; Lori Carson; Knox Chandler; Arto Lindsay; Jody Harris; Syd Straw; Peter Blegvad; Lydia Kavanagh; Nicole Blackman; Andy Hess; Tony Scherr; David Moss; Bernie Worrell; Michael Hampton; Fred Frith	The Golden Palominos (1983); Visions of Excess (1985); Blast of Silence (Axed My Baby for a Nickel) (1986); A Dead Horse (1989); Drunk with Passion (1991); This Is How It Feels (1993); Pure (1994); Dead Inside (1996); A Good Country Mile (2012)		
1981	New Race	Rob Younger (Radio Birdman); Deniz Tek (Radio Birdman); Warwick Gilbert (Radio Birdman); Ron Asheton (The Stooges); Dennis Thompson (MC5)	The First and the Last (1982)		
1982	The Lords of the New Church	Stiv Bators (The Dead Boys); Brian James (The Damned); Dave Tregunna (Sham 69); Nick Turner (The Barracudas)	The Lords of the New Church; Is Nothing Sacred?; The Method to Our Madness		
1983	KUKL	Björk Guðmundsdóttir (flute solo, Exodus, Tappi Tíkarrass); Einar Örn Benediktsson (Purrkur Pillnikk); Einar Arnaldur Melax (Medúsa); Birgir Mogensen (Spilafífl); Sigtryggur Baldursson (Þeyr); Guðlaugur Kristinn Óttarsson (Þeyr)	The Eye (1984); Holidays in Europe (1986)		
1983	This Mortal Coil	Ivo Watts-Russell; Elizabeth Fraser (Cocteau Twins); Robin Guthrie (Cocteau Twins); Simon Raymonde (Cocteau Twins); Lisa Gerrard (Dead Can Dance); Brendan Perry (Dead Can Dance); Gordon Sharp (Cindytalk); Martyn Young (Colourbox); Mark Cox (The Wolfgang Press); Steven Young (Colourbox); Manuela Rickers (Xmal Deutschland); Martin McCarrick (Marc and the Mambas); Howard Devoto (Magazine); Robbie Grey (Modern English); Dominic Appleton (Breathless); Alison Limerick (The Style Council); Richard Thomas (Dif Juz)	It'll End in Tears (1984); Filigree & Shadow (1986); Blood (1991)		
1983	Alcatrazz	Graham Bonnet (Rainbow, Michael Schenker Group); Yngwie Malmsteen (Steeler); Gary Shea (New England); Jan Uvena (Alice Cooper); Jimmy Waldo (New England); Steve Vai (Frank Zappa, The Classified, solo) replaced Malmsteen in 1984; Danny Johnson (Rick Derringer, Rod Stewart, Alice Cooper) replaced Vai in 1986	No Parole from Rock 'n' Roll (1983); Disturbing the Peace (1985) Dangerous Games (1986)		
1983	Hagar Schon Aaronson Shrieve ("HSAS")	Sammy Hagar (Montrose, Van Halen, Chickenfoot); Neal Schon (Santana, Journey, Bad English); Kenny Aaronson (Rick Derringer, Billy Idol, Billy Squier, Hall and Oates, Joan Jett and the Blackhearts); Michael Shrieve (Santana)	Through the Fire (1984)		
1984	The Firm	Paul Rodgers (Free, Bad Company); Jimmy Page (The Yardbirds, Led Zeppelin); Tony Franklin (Roy Harper, Whitesnake); Chris Slade (Uriah Heep, Manfred Mann's Earth Band, AC/DC)	The Firm (1985); Mean Business (1986)		
1984	Nick Cave and the Bad Seeds	Nick Cave (The Birthday Party); Mick Harvey (Crime and the City Solution, The Birthday Party); Blixa Bargeld (Einstürzende Neubauten); Barry Adamson (Magazine); Hugo Race (the Wreckery, solo); Thomas Wydler (Die Haut)			
1984	The Power Station	Robert Palmer; Tony Thompson (Chic); John Taylor (Duran Duran); Andy Taylor (Duran Duran)	The Power Station (1985); Living in Fear (1996)		
1985	GTR	Max Bacon; Steve Hackett (Genesis); Steve Howe (Yes); Jonathan Mover (Marillion); Phil Spalding	GTR (1986); The King Biscuit Flower Hour: GTR		
1985	Deep End	Pete Townshend (The Who); David Gilmour (Pink Floyd); Simon Phillips (RMS); Chucho Merchan (Thomas Dolby); Peter Evans (Medicine Head); Billy Nicholls; Cleveland Watkiss; John Bundrick (Mallard); Kick Horns	Deep End Live! (1986); Live: Brixton Academy '85 (2004)		
1985	The Highwaymen	Johnny Cash; Waylon Jennings (Buddy Holly, The Waylors, solo); Willie Nelson (Family); Kris Kristofferson	Highwayman (1985); Highwayman 2 (1990); The Road Goes on Forever (1995)		
1985	Gogmagog	Paul Di'Anno (Iron Maiden); Janick Gers (White Spirit, Gillan); Pete Willis (Def Leppard); Neil Murray (Colosseum II, Whitesnake, Gary Moore); Clive Burr (Samson, Iron Maiden, Alcatrazz)	I Will Be There (1985)		
1985	Mike + The Mechanics	Mike Rutherford (Genesis); 1985–2004: Paul Young (Sad Café); Paul Carrack (Ace, Squeeze, and Roxy Music); Adrian Lee; Peter Van Hooke; 2010–: Andrew Roachford; Tim Howar; Anthony Drennan	Nine studio albums; four compilation albums; more than thirty singles		
1985	Dick Fox's Golden Boys	Bobby Rydell (solo); Fabian (solo); Frankie Avalon (solo)			
1985	Dick Fox's Golden Boys	Lou Christie (solo) succeeded Rydell; Tommy Cono succeeded Christie in 2025			
1987	Bad English	John Waite (The Babys, solo); Neal Schon (Santana, Journey); Jonathan Cain (The Babys, Journey); Ricky Phillips (The Babys); Deen Castronovo (Wild Dogs, Tony MacAlpine, Cacophony)	Bad English (1989); Backlash (1991)		
1987	Blue Murder	John Sykes (Tygers of Pan Tang, Thin Lizzy, Whitesnake); Ray Gillen (Black Sabbath, Phenomena); Tony Franklin (The Firm, Jimmy Page); Cozy Powell (The Jeff Beck Group, Rainbow, The Michael Schenker Group, Whitesnake, Emerson, Lake & Powell); Carmine Appice (Vanilla Fudge, Cactus, Ozzy Osbourne, King Kobra) replaced Powell in 1988.	Blue Murder (1989); Nothin' But Trouble (1993)		
1987	Trio	Dolly Parton (solo); Linda Ronstadt (Stone Poneys, solo); Emmylou Harris (solo)	Trio (1987); Trio II (1999); The Complete Trio Collection (2016)		
1988	Tin Machine	David Bowie (solo); Reeves Gabrels (solo, David Bowie, later The Cure); Tony Sales (Todd Rundgren, Iggy Pop); Hunt Sales (Todd Rundgren, Paris, Iggy Pop, Tender Fury); Eric Schermerhorn (Iggy Pop)	Tin Machine (1989); Tin Machine II (1991); Tin Machine Live: Oy Vey, Baby (1992)		
1988	Alias	Freddy Curci (Sheriff); Steve DeMarchi (Sheriff); Roger Fisher (Heart); Steve Fossen (Heart); Mike Derosier (Heart)	Alias (1990)		
1988	Traveling Wilburys	George Harrison (The Beatles, solo); Bob Dylan (solo); Tom Petty (Tom Petty and the Heartbreakers); Jeff Lynne (The Idle Race, The Move, The Electric Light Orchestra); Roy Orbison (solo)	Traveling Wilburys Vol. 1 (1988); Traveling Wilburys Vol. 3 (1990)		
1988	Mr. Big	Eric Martin (solo); Paul Gilbert (Racer X); Billy Sheehan (Talas, UFO, David Lee Roth); Pat Torpey (Impellitteri, John Parr, Belinda Carlisle, American Bandstand); Richie Kotzen (Poison, solo) replaced Paul Gilbert in 1999	Mr. Big (1989); Lean Into It (1991); Bump Ahead (1993); Hey Man (1996); Get Over It (2000); Actual Size (2001); What If... (2011); ...The Stories We Could Tell (2014); Defying Gravity (2017)		
1988	Electronic	Bernard Sumner (Joy Division, New Order); Johnny Marr (The Smiths); Occasionally joined by: Karl Bartos (Kraftwerk); Neil Tennant (Pet Shop Boys)	Electronic (1991); Raise the Pressure (1996); Twisted Tenderness (1999)		
1988	Badlands	Jake E. Lee (Dio, Ozzy Osbourne); Ray Gillen (Black Sabbath, Phenomena, Blue Murder); Greg Chaisson (Steeler); Eric Singer (Lita Ford, Black Sabbath, Gary Moore); Jeff Martin (Racer X) replaced Singer in 1989.	Badlands (1989); Voodoo Highway (1991)		
1989	Golden Smog	Dave Pirner (Soul Asylum); Dan Murphy (Soul Asylum); Chris Mars (The Replacements); Gary Louris (The Jayhawks); Marc Perlman (The Jayhawks); Steve Gorman (Black Crowes); Kraig Johnson (Run Westy Run); Jeff Tweedy (Wilco)	On Golden Smog (1992); Down by the Old Mainstream (1995)		
1989	Damn Yankees	Ted Nugent (The Amboy Dukes, solo); Tommy Shaw (Styx); Jack Blades (Night Ranger); Michael Cartellone (later of Lynyrd Skynyrd)	Damn Yankees (1990); Don't Tread (1992)		
1990	Bell Biv DeVoe	Ricky Bell; Michael Bivins; Ronnie DeVoe	Poison (1990); Hootie Mack (1993); BBD (2001); Three Stripes (2017)		
1990	The Breeders	Kim Deal (Pixies); Tanya Donelly (Throwing Muses); Josephine Wiggs (The Perfect Disaster); Jim Macpherson; Kelley Deal	Pod (1990); Safari (1991); Last Splash (1993); Title TK (2002); Mountain Battles (2008); Fate to Fatal (2009)		
1990	Don Dokken's backing band	Don Dokken (Dokken); John Norum (Europe); Billy White (Watchtower); Peter Baltes (Accept); Mikkey Dee (King Diamond, Motörhead)	Up From The Ashes (1990)		
1990	Temple of the Dog	Chris Cornell (Soundgarden, Audioslave); Stone Gossard (Green River, Mother Love Bone, Pearl Jam); Jeff Ament (Green River, Mother Love Bone, Pearl Jam); Matt Cameron (Soundgarden); Eddie Vedder (Pearl Jam); Mike McCready (Pearl Jam)	Temple of the Dog (1990)		
1990	The Three Tenors	Plácido Domingo; José Carreras; Luciano Pavarotti	Carreras Domingo Pavarotti in Concert (1990); The Three Tenors in Concert 1994 (1994); The Three Tenors: Paris 1998 (1998); The 3 Tenors Christmas (2000)		
1990	Pigface	Martin Atkins (Public Image Ltd, Ministry, Killing Joke, Chris Connelly, Murder, Inc.); William Rieflin (Ministry, Revolting Cocks, KMFDM, R.E.M.); Trent Reznor (Nine Inch Nails); Nivek Ogre (Skinny Puppy, ohGr); cEvin Key (Skinny Puppy, The Tear Garden, Doubting Thomas); Danny Carey (Tool); En Esch (KMFDM, Slick Idiot); Genesis P-Orridge (Psychic TV, Throbbing Gristle); Steve Albini (Big Black, Rapeman, Shellac); Flea (Red Hot Chili Peppers, Fear); Chris Connelly (Ministry, Murder, Inc., Damage Manual, Revolting Cocks); Chris Vrenna (Tweaker, Nine Inch Nails, Marilyn Manson); and various other contributors	Gub (1991); Fook (1992); Notes From Thee Underground (1994); A New High in Low (1997); Easy Listening... (2003); Dubhead (2004), Free For All Tour Demo (2005); 6 (2009)		
1990	Texas Tornados	Freddy Fender (solo); Doug Sahm (Sir Douglas Quintet); Augie Meyers (Sir Douglas Quintet); Flaco Jimenez (session accordionist)	Six studio albums; two live albums; one greatest hits compilation		
1990	213	Snoop Dogg; Warren G; Nate Dogg	The Hard Way (2004)		
1991	Down	Phil Anselmo (Pantera, Superjoint Ritual); Pepper Keenan (Corrosion of Conformity); Jimmy Bower (Crowbar, Eyehategod, Superjoint Ritual); Pat Bruders (Goatwhore); Bobby Landgraf (Honky)	NOLA (1995); Down II: A Bustle in Your Hedgerow (2002); Down III: Over the Under (2007)		
1991	Contraband	Richard Black (Shark Island); Michael Schenker (Scorpions, UFO, Michael Schenker Group); Tracii Guns (Guns N' Roses, L.A. Guns); Share Pedersen (Vixen); Bobby Blotzer (Ratt)	Contraband (1991)		
1991	Lost Dogs	Terry Scott Taylor (Daniel Amos, The Swirling Eddies, solo); Michael Roe (The 77s); Derri Daugherty (The Choir); Steve Hindalong (The Choir); Gene Eugene (Adam Again, The Swirling Eddies)	14 studio and live albums		
1991	Hieroglyphics	Del The Funky Homosapien (solo); Casual (solo); Pep Love (solo, The Prose); A-Plus (Souls of Mischief); Opio (Souls of Mischief); Phesto (Souls of Mischief); Tajai (Souls of Mischief); Domino (producer); DJ Toure (producer)	3rd Eye Vision (1998); Full Circle (2003); The Kitchen (2013); All Said and Done (2026); various compilations		
1992	Magdallan	Lanny Cordola (Giuffria, House of Lords); Chuck Wright (Quiet Riot, Giuffria, House of Lords, Impellitteri) – joined in 1993; Ken Mary (Chastain, Alice Cooper, House of Lords); Phillip Bardowell – joined in 1993; Ken Tamplin (Joshua, Shout, solo) – left in 1992; Brian Bromberg – left in 1992	Big Bang (1992); Revolution Mind (1993); The Dirt (1995)		
1992	Tex, Don and Charlie	Tex Perkins (Beasts of Bourbon, The Cruel Sea, solo); Don Walker (Cold Chisel); Charlie Owen (Beasts of Bourbon, Divinyls)	Sad But True (1993); Monday Morning Coming Down (1995); All Is Forgiven (2005)		
1993	Slash's Snakepit	Slash (Guns N' Roses); 1993–1995: Matt Sorum (Guns N' Roses, The Cult); Gilby Clarke (Guns N' Roses); Mike Inez (Alice in Chains, Ozzy Osbourne); Eric Dover (Jellyfish); James LoMenzo (Pride & Glory, White Lion); Brian Tichy (Pride & Glory); 1998–2002: Johnny Griparic (Slash's Blues Ball); Rod Jackson; Ryan Roxie (Alice Cooper); Matt Laug (Alice Cooper, Venice); Keri Kelli (Big Bang Babies, Warrant, Ratt)	It's Five O'Clock Somewhere (1995); Ain't Life Grand (2000)		
1993	Voodoocult	Phillip Boa; Chuck Schuldiner (Death, later Control Denied); Gabby Abularach; Waldemar Sorychta (Grip Inc., Rotting Christ, Despair, Enemy of the Sun); Mille Petrozza (Kreator); Dave Ball; Jim Martin (Faith No More); Gabby Abularach (Cro-Mags); Dave Lombardo (Slayer)	Jesus Killing Machine (1994); Voodoocult (1995)		
1993	Blackthorne	Graham Bonnet (Rainbow, Michael Schenker Group, Alcatrazz, Impellitteri); Bob Kulick (Kiss, Meat Loaf, W.A.S.P.); Chuck Wright (Quiet Riot, Giuffria, House of Lords); Franke Banali (Quiet Riot, W.A.S.P.); Jimmy Waldo (New England, Alcatrazz)	Afterlife (1993)		
1993	Boot Camp Clik	Buckshot (Black Moon); Tek (Smif-N-Wessun); Steele (Smif-N-Wessun); Rock (Heltah Skeltah); Sean Price (Heltah Skeltah); Starang Wondah (O.G.C.); Top Dog (O.G.C.); Louieville Sluggah (O.G.C.))	For the People (1997); The Chosen Few (2002); The Last Stand (2006); Casualties of War (2007)		
1993	BBM (Bruce Baker Moore)	Jack Bruce (Cream, solo); Ginger Baker (Cream, Blind Faith); Gary Moore (Skid Row, Thin Lizzy)	Around The Next Dream (1993)		
1994	Mad Season	Layne Staley (Alice in Chains); Mike McCready (Pearl Jam); Barrett Martin (Skin Yard, Screaming Trees); John Baker Saunders (The Walkabouts)	Above (1995)		
1994	The Backbeat Band	Dave Grohl (Scream, Nirvana); Dave Pirner (Soul Asylum); Thurston Moore (Sonic Youth); Mike Mills (R.E.M.); Greg Dulli (The Afghan Whigs); Don Fleming (Gumball)	Backbeat soundtrack (1994)		
1994	Foo Fighters	Dave Grohl (Scream, Nirvana); Pat Smear (The Germs, Nirvana); Nate Mendel (Sunny Day Real Estate, The Fire Theft); William Goldsmith (Sunny Day Real Estate, The Fire Theft); Taylor Hawkins (Sass Jordan, Alanis Morissette); Franz Stahl (Scream, Wool); Chris Shiflett (No Use for a Name, Me First and the Gimme Gimmes); Rami Jaffee (The Wallflowers, Pete Yorn); Ilan Rubin (Angels & Airwaves, Nine Inch Nails, The Jaded Hearts Club, Lostprophets); Touring musicians: Drew Hester (Joe Walsh, Jewel); Jessy Greene (Soul Asylum, The Jayhawks); Petra Haden (that dog., The Decemberists)	Foo Fighters (1995); The Colour and the Shape (1997); There Is Nothing Left to Lose (1999); One By One (2002); In Your Honor (2005); Echoes, Silence, Patience & Grace (2007); Wasting Light (2011); Sonic Highways (2014); Concrete and Gold (2017); Medicine at Midnight (2021); But Here We Are (2023); Your Favorite Toy (2026)		
1994	Glenmark Eriksson Strömstedt	Anders Glenmark; Orup (Hans Thomas Eriksson); Niklas Strömstedt	Glenmark, Eriksson, Strömstedt (1995); Den andra skivan (2003)		
1994	Sly	Minoru Niihara (Loudness); Shinichiro Ishihara (Earthshaker); Koichi Terasawa; Munetaka Higuchi (Loudness)	Sly (1994); Dreams of Dust (1995); Key (1996); Vulcan Wind (1998)		
1995	Afro Celt Sound System	Emmerson version Core lineup: Simon Emmerson (Weekend, Working Week, The Imagined Village, Baaba Maal); N'Faly Kouyate (solo); Johnny Kalsi (solo, Transglobal Underground, The Dhol Foundation, The Imagined Village, Alaap,); Griogair Labhruidh (solo); Russell/McNally version: Martin Russell (The Enid, Craft, solo); James McNally (solo, The Pogues); Ian Markin (The Dhol Foundation); Tim Bradshaw (The Fat Lady Sings, David Gray, John Mayer); Barbara Bangoura (solo); Dorothee Munyaneza (solo); Kadially Kouyaté (solo); Dav Daheley (Stomp, The Dhol Foundation, Malkit Singh, Alaap, Juggy D); Former members: Iarla Ó Lionáird (solo, The Gloaming, Pádraigín Ní Uallacháin); Jo Bruce; Kauwding Cissokho (Baaba Maal, Tarika, Michael Brook); Massamba Diop (Baaba Maal, Tony Vacca/The Senegal-America Project, Daande Lenol Orchestra, Massamba); Myrdhin (solo)	Volume 1: Sound Magic (1996); Volume 2: Release (1999); Volume 3: Further in Time (2001); Seed (2003); Pod (Remix album, 2004); Volume 5: Anatomic (2005)	In January 2016, Afro Celt Sound System announced that there is currently a dispute over the ownership of the name "Afro Celt Sound System", and that currently two bands exist, a lineup led by founder Simon Emmerson, and a different line-up headed by Martin Russell and James McNally.	
1995	Me First and the Gimme Gimmes	Spike Slawson (Swingin' Utters); "Fat" Mike Burkett (NOFX); Joey Cape (Lagwagon); Dave Raun (Lagwagon); Former members: Chris Shiflett (Foo Fighters, No Use for a Name)	Have a Ball (1997); Are a Drag (1999); Blow in the Wind (2001); Take a Break (2003); Ruin Jonny's Bar Mitzvah (2004); Love Their Country (2006); Have Another Ball (2008,)		
1995	Cork	Eric Schenkman (Spin Doctors); Corky Laing (Mountain)	Speed of Thought (1999); Out There (2000)		
1995	Cork	Noel Redding (The Jimi Hendrix Experience) toured with and worked on both albums released by the band	Speed of Thought (1999); Out There (2000)		
1995	Neurotic Outsiders	Steve Jones (Sex Pistols); Duff McKagan (Guns N' Roses, The Fartz); John Taylor (Duran Duran); Matt Sorum (Guns N' Roses, The Cult)	Neurotic Outsiders (1996)		
1995	Left Out	Bryan Gray (The Blamed, Six Feet Deep, Blenderhead); Darren "Klank" Diolosa (Klank, Circle of Dust, Argyle Park/AP2); Jesse Smith (Zao, Society's Finest); Chris Colbert (Breakfast with Amy, Fluffy); Jim Chaffin (The Crucified, Deliverance, Fasedown, The Blamed, Once Dead, Lifesavers Underground, Mortal); Brent Kaping (Craig's Brother); Matt Switaj (The Blamed); Christopher Wiitala (The Blamed, The Wiitala Brothers); Trevor Wiitala (The Blamed, The Wiitala Brothers); Greg Jacues (Crashdog); Myk Porter (Six Feet Deep, Brandtson); Jake Landrau; Brian Porter; Jason Seiler; Timothy Haslam; Darren Meloche; Philip Kilppert; Richard Turner	Pride Kills (1996); Self Serve (1997); For the Working Class (1999); Left Out (2002)	Founded by Bryan Gray, Left Out rotated through members with each release.	
1995	Stavesacre	Current members: Mark Salomon (The Crucified, Argyle Park, Neon Horse); Jeff Bellew (The Crucified, CHATTERbOx, Argyle Park); Dirk Lemmenes (Focused, Argyle Park); Sam West (Scaterd Few, The Violet Burning, Saviour Machine); Ryan Dennee; Former members: Jeremy Moffett (The Blamed); Neil Samoy	Friction (1996); Absolutes (1997); Speakeasy (1999); (stāvz'ā'kər) (2002); How to Live with a Curse (2006); Stavesacre VI (2016)		
1996	Lúnasa	Seán Smyth (solo); Trevor Hutchinson (solo, The Waterboys, Sharon Shannon); Kevin Crawford (solo, Cillian Vallely) – joined in 1997; Cillian Vallely (solo, Niall Vallely) – joined in 1999; Ed Boyd (Flook, solo, Cara Dillon, Michael McGoldrick Band) – joined in 2012; Former members: Donogh Hennessy (solo, Sharon Shannon, Pauline Scanlon, Susan McKeown) – left in 2004; Michael McGoldrick (Flook, solo, Capercaillie, Eden's Bridge, Kate Rusby, Northern Lights) – left in 1999; John McSherry (solo, Tamalin, At First Light, Dónal O'Connor & Seán Óg Graham, Michael McGoldrick) – left in 1999; Tim Edey (solo, The Chieftains, Brendan Power, Liam Ó Maonlaí, Kevin Burke and Tim Edey) – joined in 2004, left in 2006; Paul Meehan – (solo) – joined in 2004, left in 2011	Lúnasa, Otherworld (1999); The Merry Sisters of Fate (2001); Redwood (2003); The Kinnitty Sessions (2004); Sé (2006); Lá Nua (2010)		
1996	Queens of the Stone Age	Josh Homme (Kyuss); Troy Van Leeuwen (Failure, A Perfect Circle); Michael Shuman (Wires on Fire, Jubilee); Dean Fertita (The Waxwings; Jon Theodore (The Mars Volta)			
1996	Westside Connection	Ice Cube (N.W.A); WC (WC and the Maad Circle); Mack 10	Bow Down (1996); Terrorist Threats (2003)		
1996	Def Squad	Erick Sermon (EPMD); Redman; Keith Murray	El Niño (1998)		
1996	Zilch	hide (Solo, X Japan); Ray McVeigh (The Professionals); Paul Raven (Killing Joke); Joey Castillo (Danzig, Queens of the Stone Age); I.N.A. (hide with Spread Beaver)	3.2.1. (1998); Bastard Eyes (1999); Skyjin (2001); "Mimizuzero" (2001); "Charlie's Children" (2001)		
1996	The Firm	Nas; AZ; Nature; Foxy Brown	The Firm: The Album (1997)		
1997	Deepspace5	Playdough/Harry Krum (Solo, Ill Harmonics, Phonetic Composition); Manchild (Solo, Mars Ill, deadpoetsociety, Move Merchants, The Pride); DJ Dust (Solo, Mars Ill, deadpoetsoecity); Freddie Bruno (Solo, Phonetic Composition); Listener (Listener, Labklik); Beat Rabbi (Solo, Circumcised Mind); Manwell? (Solo); Sivion (Solo, Phat KATS); Sev Statik (Solo, Tunnel Rats, Pitch Control Music, Goldtooth, Master Plan, All Bully, Body Language, Illumination); Sintax the Terrific (Solo, The Pride); Ill Tripp (Solo, Labklik); Recon (Solo, The Pride)	Seven albums and an EP		
1997	Liquid Tension Experiment	Tony Levin (King Crimson, Peter Gabriel, Bruford Levin Upper Extremities, HoBoLeMa, Stick Men); John Petrucci (Dream Theater); Mike Portnoy (Dream Theater, Transatlantic, Flying Colors, Adrenaline Mob); Jordan Rudess (Dream Theater)	Liquid Tension Experiment (1998); Liquid Tension Experiment 2 (1999); Liquid Tension Experiment 3 (2021)		
1997	LSG	Gerald Levert (LeVert); Keith Sweat; Johnny Gill (New Edition); Replacement: Eddie Levert (in place of son Gerald after death (2013–present) performing only shows.	Levert.Sweat.Gill (1997); LSG2 (2003)		
1997	Timbaland & Magoo	Timbaland (Swing Mob / Da Bassment); Magoo (Swing Mob)	Welcome To Our World (1997); Indecent Proposal (2001); Under Construction Part II (2003)	The collective fell apart in 1995, which led the remaining members Timbaland, Magoo, Playa, Ginuwine & Missy Elliott to create a spinoff collective group called Superfriends	
1997	The Twilight Singers	Greg Dulli ( The Afghan Whigs, The Gutter Twins)); Shawn Smith (Brad, Satchel, Pigeonhed); Happ Chichester (Royal Crescent Mob, Howlin' Maggie); Apollonia (Apollonia 6); Mark Lanegan (Screaming Trees, Queens of the Stone Age, The Gutter Twins)			
1998	Austria3	Wolfgang Ambros; Georg Danzer; Rainhard Fendrich	Live Vol. 1 (1998); Freunde (CD Single, 1998); Live Vol. 2 (8 June 1998); Die Dritte (10 October 2000); Weusd' mei Freund bist — Das Beste von Austria3 — Live (16 June 2003); Weusd' mei Freund bist ... Aus dem filmischen Tagebuch von Austria 3 (16 June 2003); Austropop Kult (18 October 2004); Nur das Beste (28 July 2006); Zwanzig (8 December 2017)		
1998	Bad Meets Evil	Royce da 5'9" (Bad); Eminem (Evil, solo)	Hell: The Sequel (2011); "Nuttin' to Do" (1998); "Scary Movies" (1998); "Fast Lane" (2011); "Lighters" (2011)		
1998	Cry Cry Cry	Richard Shindell (solo); Lucy Kaplansky (solo); Dar Williams (solo)	Cry Cry Cry (1998)		
1998	Fantômas	Mike Patton (Faith No More); Buzz Osborne (Melvins); Trevor Dunn (Mr. Bungle); Dave Lombardo (Slayer); Terry Bozzio (Frank Zappa) – touring	Fantômas (1999); The Director's Cut (2001); Delìrium Còrdia (2004); Suspended Animation (2004)		
1998	Bloodbath	Dan Swanö (Edge of Sanity, Nightingale); Peter Tägtgren (Hypocrisy, PAIN); Mikael Åkerfeldt (Opeth); Anders Nyström (Katatonia); Jonas Renkse (Katatonia); Martin Axenrot (Opeth, Witchery); Per Eriksson (Katatonia); Nick Holmes	Resurrection Through Carnage (2002); Nightmares Made Flesh (2004); The Fathomless Mastery (2008); Grand Morbid Funeral 2014		
1998	Mass Mental	Benji Webbe (Dub War, Skindred); Robert Trujillo (Suicidal Tendencies, Metallica); Brooks Wackerman (Bad Religion, Avenged Sevenfold); Armand Sabal-Lecco	How to Write Love Songs (1998); Live in Tokyo (1999)		
1998	Eagles of Death Metal	Jesse Hughes (Boots Electric); Josh Homme (Queens of the Stone Age, Them Crooked Vultures, Kyuss)	Peace, Love, Death Metal (2004); Death by Sexy (2006); Heart On (2008); Zipper Down (2015); EODM Presents Boots Electric Performing the Best Songs We Never Wrote (2019)		
1998	Ima Robot	Alex Ebert (Edward Sharpe and the Magnetic Zeros); Justin Meldal-Johnsen (Beck, Nine Inch Nails); Joey Waronker (Beck, R.E.M.); Filip "Turbotito" Nikolic; Orpheo McCord (Edward Sharpe and the Magnetic Zeros, The Fall, Cass McCombs); Oliver "Oligee" Goldstein (Oliver); Scott Devours (The Who); Timmy "The Terror" Anderson; Jonas Petri Megyessi; Andy Marlow; Lars Vognstrup; Jason "Computer Jay" Taylor	Very Not Ok, Underdogs Drowse EP (1999); Song #1 EP (2003); Alive EP (2003); Ima Robot (2003); Monument to the Masses (2006); Search and Destroy EP (2006); Another Man's Treasure (2010)		
1999	Avantasia	Tobias Sammet (Edguy); Michael Kiske (Helloween); David DeFeis (Virgin Steele); Ralf Zdiarstek; Sharon den Adel (Within Temptation); Rob Rock (Impellitteri); Oliver Hartmann (At Vance); André Matos (Shaaman, Angra, Viper); Kai Hansen (Helloween, Gamma Ray); Timo Tolkki (Stratovarius); Bob Catley (Magnum); Jørn Lande (Masterplan, Ark); Amanda Somerville (Aina); Roy Khan (Kamelot); Alice Cooper; Klaus Meine (Scorpions); Eric Singer (Kiss, Black Sabbath, Alice Cooper); Henjo Richter (Gamma Ray); Markus Grosskopf (Helloween); Alex Holzwarth (Rhapsody of Fire, Angra); Jens Ludwig (Edguy); Norman Meiritz; Frank Tischer; Sascha Paeth (Aina, Heavens Gate, Kamelot); Michael "Miro" Rodenberg (Aina, Kamelot); Rudolph Schenker (Scorpions)	The Metal Opera (2001); Avantasia (2001); The Metal Opera Part II (2002); Lost in Space Part I (2007); Lost in Space Part II (2007); The Scarecrow (2008); The Wicked Symphony (2010); Angel of Babylon (2010); The Mystery of Time (2013); Ghostlights (2016); Moonglow (2019); A Paranormal Evening with the Moonflower Society (2022)		
1999	Bruderschaft	Rexx Arkana; Ronan Harris (VNV Nation); Joakim Montelius (Covenant); Sebastian Komor (solo); Stephan Groth (Apoptygma Berzerk); Johann Sebastian; Tom Shear (Assemblage 23); Andylab (Syrian); Dräcos; Daniel Graves (Aesthetic Perfection); Jared Lambert (Ien Oblique); Maze; Stefan Netschio (Beborn Beton); P-O Svensson (Colony 5); Daniel Myer (Haujobb)	Forever (2003); Return (2013)		
1999	Dark Lotus	Blaze Ya Dead Homie; Jamie Madrox (Twiztid); Monoxide (Twiztid); Shaggy 2 Dope (Insane Clown Posse); Violent J (Insane Clown Posse)	Tales from the Lotus Pod (2001); Black Rain (2004); The Opaque Brotherhood (2008)		
1999	Dark Lotus	Former members include: Anybody Killa; Marz; Vampiro	Tales from the Lotus Pod (2001); Black Rain (2004); The Opaque Brotherhood (2008)		
1999	Broken Social Scene	Kevin Drew (KC Accidental); Brendan Canning (By Divine Right, hHead, Valley of the Giants); Justin Peroff (Junior Blue); Charles Spearin (Do Make Say Think, KC Accidental); Leslie Feist; Jason Collett; Andrew Whiteman (Apostle of Hustle); Emily Haines (Metric, Emily Haines & The Soft Skeleton); James Shaw (Metric); Evan Cranley (Stars); Amy Millan (Stars); Ohad Benchetrit (Do Make Say Think, The Hidden Cameras); Marty Kinack (Hayden); Bill Priddle (Treble Charger, Don Vail, The Priddle Concern); Torquil Campbell (Stars); Lisa Lobsinger (Reverie Sound Revue); Julie Penner (The FemBots, Do Make Say Think, The Hylozoists, The Lowest of the Low, The Weakerthans); Jason Tait (Fembots, The Weakerthans); Mitch Bowden (Chore, Sons of Butcher, Don Vail, The Priddle Concern); Elizabeth Powell (Land of Talk)	Feel Good Lost (2001); You Forgot it in People (2002); Bee Hives (2004); Broken Social Scene (2005); Spirit If... (2007); Something for All of Us... (2008); Forgiveness Rock Record (2010)		
1999	Dream Evil	Gus G. (Firewind); Snowy Shaw (King Diamond, Mercyful Fate, Notre Dame); Niklas Isfeldt (HammerFall, Pure-X); Peter Stålfors (Pure-X)	Dragonslayer (2002); Evilized (2003); The Book of Heavy Metal (2004); United (2006)		
1999	Lucy Pearl	Raphael Saadiq (Tony! Toni! Toné!); Dawn Robinson (En Vogue); Ali Shaheed Muhammad (A Tribe Called Quest)	Lucy Pearl (2000)		
1999	A Perfect Circle	Billy Howerdel; Maynard James Keenan (Tool); Josh Freese (The Vandals, Devo, Nine Inch Nails, Guns N' Roses, Weezer); James Iha (The Smashing Pumpkins); Jeordie White (Marilyn Manson, later Goon Moon and Nine Inch Nails)			
1999	A Perfect Circle	Former members include: Paz Lenchantin (Zwan); Troy Van Leeuwen (Queens of the Stone Age); Tim Alexander (Primus).			
1999	Transatlantic	Neal Morse (Spock's Beard); Mike Portnoy (Dream Theater); Roine Stolt (The Flower Kings); Pete Trewavas (Marillion)	SMPT:e (2000); Live in America (2001); Bridge Across Forever (2003); The Whirlwind (2009); Kaleidoscope (2014)		
1999	The Transplants	Tim Armstrong (Rancid); Skinhead Rob Aston (Expensive Taste); Travis Barker (Blink-182, Aquabats); Kevin Bivona (The Interrupters)	Transplants (2002); Haunted Cities (2004)		
1999	Rebel Meets Rebel	David Allan Coe; Dimebag Darrell (Pantera, Damageplan); Rex Brown (Pantera, Down); Vinnie Paul (Pantera, Damageplan, Hellyeah)	Rebel Meets Rebel (2006)		
1999	The Wondergirls	Ian Astbury (The Cult, Holy Barbarians, The Doors of the 21st Century); Ken Andrews (Failure, ON, Year of the Rabbit); Shannon Leto (Thirty Seconds to Mars); Scott Weiland (Stone Temple Pilots, Velvet Revolver); Mark McGrath (Sugar Ray); Jay Gordon (Orgy); Ryan Shuck (Orgy, Julien-K, Sexart); Doug Ardito (Puddle of Mudd); Troy Van Leeuwen (Queens of the Stone Age, Enemy, Failure, A Perfect Circle, Sweethead); Martyn LeNoble (Porno for Pyros, The Cult, Class of '99); Ashley Hamilton	"Drop That Baby" (1999); "Let's Go All the Way" (1999)		
1999	Loaded	Duff McKagan (Guns N' Roses, Neurotic Outsiders, The Fartz); Dez Cadena (Black Flag); Michael Barragan (Plexi); Taz Bentley (The Reverend Horton Heat); Dave Dederer (The Presidents of the United States of America); Geoff Reading (Green Apple Quick Step, New American Shame); Mike Squires (Nevada Bachelors, Harvey Danger, The Long Winters); Jeff Rouse (Alien Crime Syndicate, Vendetta Red, Sirens Sister); Dave Kushner (Wasted Youth, Electric Love Hogs); George Stuart Dahlquist (Burning Witch); Isaac Carpenter (Loudermilk, Gosling, The Exies)	Episode 1999: Live (1999); Dark Days (2001); Wasted Heart EP (2008); Sick (2009)		
1999	Method Man & Redman (Red & Meth / John Blaze & Funk Doc)	Method Man (Wu-Tang Clan); Redman (Def Squad)	Blackout! (1999); Blackout! 2 (2009); How High: The Soundtrack(2001); Lights Out (2009)		
2000	JAM Project	Ichirou Mizuki (solo); Hironobu Kageyama (solo); Masaaki Endoh; Hiroshi Kitadani; Masami Okui; Yoshiki Fukuyama; Ricardo Cruz; Former members: Eizo Sakamoto; Rica Matsumoto			
2000	The Hrsmn	Killah Priest; Ras Kass; Canibus; Kurupt	The Horsemen Project (2003)		
2000	The New Pornographers	Carl Newman (A.C. Newman); Neko Case; Dan Bejar (Destroyer); John Collins (Canadian musician); Todd Fancey (Fancey); Kathryn Calder; Kurt Dahle; Simi Sernaker	Mass Romantic (2000); Electric Version (2003); Twin Cinema (2005); Challengers (album) (2007); Together (The New Pornographers album) (2010); Brill Bruisers (2014); Whiteout Conditions (2017); In the Morse Code of Brake Lights (2019); Continue as a Guest (2023)		
2000	The Silk Road Ensemble	Founders: Yo-Yo Ma; Joseph Gramley; Contributors: Mike Block; Gevorg Dabaghyan; Sandeep Das; Joel Fan; Kayhan Kalhor; Khongorzul Ganbaatar; Cristina Pato; Alim Qasimovs; Wu Man; Rabih Abou-Khalil; Franghiz Ali-Zadeh; Gabriela Lena Frank; Osvaldo Golijov; Angel Lam; Ljova; Sangidorjiin Sansargereltekh; Vache Sharafyan; Byambasuren Sharav; Giovanni Sollima; Zhao Jiping; Evan Ziporyn	Silk Road Journey: When Strangers Meet (2001); Silk Road Journeys: Beyond the Horizon (2005; New Impossibilities (2007); Traditions and Transformations: Sounds of Silk Road Chicago (2008); Off the Map (2009); A Playlist Without Borders (2013)		
2001	Son of Sam	Davey Havok (AFI, Blaqk Audio); London May (Samhain, Tiger Army); Todd Youth (Samhain, Danzig); Steve Zing (Samhain, Danzig)	Songs from the Earth (2001)		
2001	Oysterhead	Trey Anastasio (Phish); Stewart Copeland (The Police); Les Claypool (Primus)	The Grand Pecking Order(2001)		
2001	The Philadelphia Experiment	Uri Caine; Questlove (The Roots); Christian McBride	The Philadelphia Experiment (2001)		
2001	Audioslave	Chris Cornell (Soundgarden, Temple of the Dog); Tom Morello (Rage Against the Machine, Lock Up); Tim Commerford (Rage Against the Machine); Brad Wilk (Rage Against the Machine)	Audioslave (2002); Out of Exile (2005); Revelations (2006)		
2001	Spys4Darwin	Chris DeGarmo (Queensrÿche); Sean Kinney (Alice in Chains); Vinnie Dombroski (Sponge, Crud); Mike Inez (Alice in Chains, Black Label Society)	microfish (2001)		
2001	Khanate	Alan Dubin (OLD); James Plotkin (OLD); Stephen O'Malley (Burning Witch, Sunn O); Tim Wyskida (Blind Idiot God)	Khanate (2001); Things Viral (2003); Capture & Release (2005); Clean Hands Go Foul (2009)		
2001	The Kills	Alison Mosshart (Discount, The Dead Weather); Jamie Hince ( Fiji, Scarfo, Blyth Power)	Keep on Your Mean Side (2003); No Wow (2005); Midnight Boom (2008); Blood Pressures (2011); Ash & Ice (2016); God Games (2023)		
2001	The Postal Service	Ben Gibbard (Death Cab for Cutie); Jimmy Tamborello (Dntel, Figurine); Jenny Lewis (Rilo Kiley, Jenny Lewis and the Watson Twins); Laura Burhenn (The Mynabirds)	Give Up (2003)		
2001	Zwan	Billy Corgan (The Smashing Pumpkins, Starchildren, The Marked, solo); Paz Lenchantin (A Perfect Circle, Into the Presence); Matt Sweeney (Chavez); Dave Pajo (Slint, King Kong); Jimmy Chamberlin (The Smashing Pumpkins, The Last Hard Men, Jimmy Chamberlin Complex)	Mary Star of the Sea (2003)		
2002	Colonel Claypool's Bucket of Bernie Brains	Les Claypool (Primus, Oysterhead); Buckethead (solo, Deli Creeps, Guns N' Roses); Bernie Worrell (Parliament-Funkadelic); Bryan "Brain" Mantia (Primus, Buckethead, Guns N' Roses)	The Big Eyeball in the Sky (2004)		
2002	Eyes Adrift	Curt Kirkwood (Meat Puppets); Krist Novoselic (Nirvana); Bud Gaugh (Sublime)	Eyes Adrift (2002)		
2002	Box Car Racer	Tom DeLonge (Blink-182); David Kennedy (Over My Dead Body); Travis Barker (Blink-182)	Box Car Racer (2002)		
2002	Velvet Revolver	Scott Weiland (Stone Temple Pilots); Slash (Guns N' Roses, Slash's Snakepit); Duff McKagan (Guns N' Roses, Loaded, The Fartz); Matt Sorum (Guns N' Roses, The Cult); Dave Kushner (Wasted Youth, Electric Love Hogs, Loaded)	Contraband (2004); Libertad (2007)		
2002	Star One	Arjen Anthony Lucassen (Ayreon); Russell Allen (Symphony X); Damian Wilson (Threshold, Headspace); Dan Swanö (Edge of Sanity, Nightingale); Floor Jansen (After Forever, ReVamp, Nightwish)	Space Metal (2002); Victims of the Modern Age (2010)		
2002	Moderat	Sascha Ring (Apparat); Gernot Bronsert (Modeselektor); Sebastian Szary (Modeselektor)	Moderat (2009); II (2013); III (2016)		
2002	OSI	Jim Matheos (Fates Warning); Kevin Moore (Chroma Key)			
2002	Brides of Destruction	London LeGrand (Rockstars on Mars); Tracii Guns (L.A. Guns, Contraband); Nikki Sixx (Mötley Crüe, 58, Sixx:A.M.); Scot Coogan (Ednaswap, Annetenna); Scott Sorry (Amen); Ginger (The Wildhearts)	Here Come the Brides (2004); Runaway Brides (2005)		
2002	Brides of Destruction	Before the release of their debut album, the group's lineup included: John Corabi (Mötley Crüe); Adam Hamilton (L.A. Guns); Kris Kohls ( Adema)	Here Come the Brides (2004); Runaway Brides (2005)		
2003	Living Loud	Bob Daisley (Widowmaker, Rainbow, Ozzy Osbourne, Uriah Heep, Gary Moore, Black Sabbath); Lee Kerslake (The Gods, Toe Fat, Uriah Heep, Ozzy Osbourne); Jimmy Barnes (Cold Chisel, solo); Steve Morse (Dixie Dregs, Kansas, Deep Purple, solo); Don Airey (Colosseum II, Rainbow, Ozzy Osbourne, Gary Moore, Deep Purple)	Living Loud (2004)		
2003	Nu:Logic	Nu:Tone; Logistics	What I've Always Waited For (2013)		
2003	Starpool	Alan Meade (No Doubt); Bill Uechi (Save Ferris); Brian Mashburn (Save Ferris); Eric Zamora (Save Ferris); Oliver Zamora (Save Ferris); Tbone Willy (Save Ferris); Phil Hanson; Evan Kilbourne (Save Ferris)	Living in Transition (2010)		
2003	The Gutter Twins	Greg Dulli (The Afghan Whigs, The Twilight Singers); Mark Lanegan (Screaming Trees, Queens of the Stone Age, The Twilight Singers)	Saturnalia (2008)		
2004	Frost*	Jem Godfrey; John Mitchell (Arena, It Bites, Kino); John Jowitt (IQ, Arena); Andy Edwards (Priory of Brion, Ian Parker Band, IQ); Dec Burke	Milliontown (2006; Experiments in Mass Appeal (2008); Falling Satellites (2016)		
2004	Ataxia	John Frusciante (Red Hot Chili Peppers); Josh Klinghoffer (Red Hot Chili Peppers, Dot Hacker, The Bicycle Thief); Joe Lally (Fugazi)	Automatic Writing (2004); AWII (2007)		
2004	Wintersun	Jari Mäenpää (Ensiferum); Teemu Mäntysaari (Imperanon); Jukka Koskinen (Norther); Kai Hahto (Rotten Sound)	Wintersun (2004); Time (2009)	Until after the release of their first album, Jari handled all instruments except drums, which were left to Kai. Teemu and Jukka were hired to complete a touring-ready lineup.	
2004	Madvillain	MF Doom; Madlib	Madvillainy (2004); Four Tet Remixes (2005); Madvillainy 2 (2008)		
2004	The Sound of Animals Fighting	Rich Balling (RX Bandits); Matt Embree (RX Bandits); Chris Tsagakis (RX Bandits); Randy Strohmeyer (Finch); Derek Doherty (Finch); Anthony Green (Circa Survive, Saosin, Zolof the Rock & Roll Destroyer); Craig Owens (Chiodos, Cinematic Sunrise, Isles & Glaciers, Destroy Rebuild Until God Shows); Keith Goodwin (Days Away); Matthew Kelly (The Autumns); Steve Choi (RX Bandits); Joe Troy (RX Bandits); Rich Zahniser (The Hippos)	Tiger and the Duke (2005); Lover, the Lord Has Left Us... (2006); The Ocean and the Sun (2008)		
2004	Nomadic Massive	Butta Beats; Nantali Indongo; Rawgged MC; Lou Piensa; Meryem Saci; Vox Sambou; Ali Sepu; Waahli	Nomad's Land (2006); Nomadic Massive (2009); The Big Band Theory (2016)		
2004	Alter Bridge	Myles Kennedy (The Mayfield Four); Mark Tremonti (Creed); Scott Phillips (Creed); Brian Marshall (Creed)	One Day Remains (2004); Blackbird (2007); AB III (2010); Fortress (2013); The Last Hero (2016); Walk the Sky (2019); Pawns and Kings (2022); Alter Bridge (2026)		
2004	Monsters of Folk	Conor Oberst (Bright Eyes, Conor Oberst and the Mystic Valley Band, Desaparecidos, Commander Venus, Park Ave.); Jim James (My Morning Jacket); Mike Mogis (Bright Eyes, Lullaby for the Working Class); M. Ward (She & Him)	Monsters of Folk (2009)		
2004	Falcon	Brendan Kelly (The Lawrence Arms); Neil Hennessy (The Lawrence Arms); Dan Andriano (Alkaline Trio); Chris McCaughan (The Lawrence Arms, Sundowner); Todd Mohney (Rise Against)	Unicornography (2006)		
2004	Queen + Paul Rodgers	Brian May (Queen); Roger Taylor (Queen); Paul Rodgers (Bad Company, Free)	Return of the Champions (2005); Super Live in Japan (2005); The Cosmos Rocks (2008); Live in Ukraine (2009)		
2005	+44	Mark Hoppus (Blink-182); Travis Barker (Blink-182); Shane Gallagher (The Nervous Return); Craig Fairbaugh (Mercy Killers)	When Your Heart Stops Beating (2006)		
2005	Angels & Airwaves	Tom DeLonge (Blink-182); David Kennedy (Over My Dead Body); Ilan Rubin (Lostprophets, Nine Inch Nails); Matt Rubano (Taking Back Sunday); Former members: Ryan Sinn (The Distillers) was replaced by Matt Wachter; Atom Willard (The Offspring) was replaced by Ilan Rubin; Matt Wachter (Thirty Seconds to Mars) was replaced by Eddie Breckenridge, then later by Matt Rubano; Eddie Breckenridge (Thrice) was replaced by Matt Rubano	We Don't Need to Whisper (2006); I-Empire (2007); Love (2010); Love II (2011); The Dream Walker (2014); Lifeforms (2021)		
2005	Army of Anyone	Richard Patrick (Filter, Nine Inch Nails); Dean DeLeo (Stone Temple Pilots); Robert DeLeo (Stone Temple Pilots); Ray Luzier (David Lee Roth, Korn)	Army of Anyone (2006)		
2005	Dark New Day	Brett Hestla (Virgos Merlot); Clint Lowery (Sevendust); Troy McLawhorn (doubleDrive); Corey Lowery (Stereomud, Stuck Mojo); Will Hunt (Skrape)	Twelve Year Silence (2005); Black Porch (Acoustic Sessions) EP (2006); New Tradition (2012); Hail Mary (2013)		
2005	Five Finger Death Punch	Ivan Moody (Motograter); Zoltan Bathory (U.P.O.); Jason Hook (Alice Cooper); Jeremy Spencer (W.A.S.P.)	The Way of the Fist (2007); War Is the Answer (2009); American Capitalist (2011)		
	The Good, the Bad & the Queen	Damon Albarn (Blur and Gorillaz; Paul Simonon (tThe Clash; Simon Tong (The Verve; Tony Allen (Africa '70)			
	The Raconteurs	Jack White (The White Stripes); Brendan Benson; Jack Lawrence (The Greenhornes); Patrick Keeler (The Greenhornes)			
2006	Heavens	Matt Skiba (Alkaline Trio, Blink-182); Josiah Steinbrick (F-Minus)	Patent Pending (2006)		
2006	All Angels	Melanie Nakhla; Charlotte Ritchie; Daisy Chute; Rachel Fabri (joined in 2010); Former members: Laura Wright (left in 2010)	All Angels (2006); Into Paradise (2007); Fly Away (2009)		
2006	Heaven and Hell	Vinny Appice (Black Sabbath, Rick Derringer, Dio, Hear 'n Aid); Geezer Butler (Black Sabbath, GZR); Ronnie James Dio (Black Sabbath, Elf, Rainbow, Dio, Hear 'n Aid); Tony Iommi (Black Sabbath, Jethro Tull, Rock Aid Armenia)	Live from Radio City Music Hall (2007); The Devil You Know (2009)	A reformation of the 1980–1982 Black Sabbath lineup	
2006	Big Dirty Band	Geddy Lee (Rush); Alex Lifeson (Rush); Ian Thornley (Big Wreck, Thornley); Adam Gontier (Three Days Grace); Care Failure (Die Mannequin); Jeff Burrows (The Tea Party)			
2006	Another Animal	Whitfield Crane (Ugly Kid Joe); Tony Rambola (Godsmack); Lee Richards (Dropbox); Robbie Merrill (Godsmack); Shannon Larkin (Godsmack, Ugly Kid Joe)	Another Animal (2007)		
2006	Black President	Christian Martucci (Dee Dee Ramone, The Chelsea Smiles); Charlie Paulson (Goldfinger); Jason Christopher (New Dead Radio); Roy Mayorga (Soulfly, Nausea, Stone Sour)	Black President (2008)		
2006	Black President	Formerly featured: Greg Hetson (Bad Religion, Circle Jerks); Wade Youman (Unwritten Law); Ty Smith (Guttermouth); Pat "PK" Kim (Unwritten Law)	Black President (2008)		
2006	Thought Chamber	Ted Leonard (Enchant); Michael Harris (Arch Rival, Vitalij Kuprij); Derek Blakley (Haji's Kitchen, Michael Harris); Rob Stankiewicz (Haji's Kitchen, Michael Harris); Bobby Williamson (Outworld)	Angular Perceptions (2007)		
2006	La Coka Nostra	Ill Bill (Non Phixion MC, Heavy Metal Kings); Slaine (Special Teamz MC); DJ Lethal (Current House of Pain); Danny Boy (House of Pain hype man); Everlast (House of Pain)	A Brand You Can Trust (2009); Masters of the Dark Arts (2012); To Thine Own Self Be True (2016)		
2007	Hellyeah	Chad Gray (Mudvayne); Tom Maxwell (Nothingface); Kyle Sanders (Bloodsimple); Roy Mayorga (Stone Sour); Former members: Jerry Montano (Nothingface); Bob Zilla (Damageplan); Greg Tribbett (Mudvayne); Vinnie Paul (Pantera), (Damageplan)	Hellyeah (2007); Stampede (2010); Band of Brothers (2012); Blood for Blood (2014); Undeniable (2016); Welcome Home (2019)		
2007	Against All Will	Jimmy Allen (Puddle of Mudd); Mark Bistany (Otep, Puddle of Mudd); Mizzy Pacheco	A Rhyme and Reason (2009)		
2007	Cavalera Conspiracy	Max Cavalera (Sepultura, Soulfly, Nailbomb); Igor Cavalera (Sepultura); Marc Rizzo (Soulfly, Ill Niño, solo); Joe Duplantier (Gojira)	Inflikted (2008); Blunt Force Trauma (2011)		
2007	Magnetic Man	Skream; Benga; Artwork	Magnetic Man (2010)		
2007	Child Rebel Soldier	Kanye West; Lupe Fiasco (solo, Japanese Cartoon, All City Chess Club); Pharrell Williams (solo, N*E*R*D, The Neptunes, All City Chess Club)			
2007	Northern Kings	Jarkko Ahola (Teräsbetoni); Marko Hietala (Tarot, Nightwish); Tony Kakko (Sonata Arctica); Juha-Pekka Leppäluoto (Charon)	Reborn (2007); Rethroned (2008)		
2007	The Last Shadow Puppets	Alex Turner (Arctic Monkeys); Miles Kane (The Rascals); James Ford (Simian Mobile Disco, Simian)	The Age of the Understatement (2008); Everything You've Come To Expect (2016)		
2007	Works Progress Administration	Glen Phillips (Toad the Wet Sprocket); Sean Watkins (Nickel Creek); Luke Bulla (Lyle Lovett, solo); Benmont Tench (Tom Petty and the Heartbreakers); Sara Watkins (Nickel Creek); Greg Leisz (solo); Pete Thomas (Elvis Costello & the Attractions); Davey Faragher (Cracker, John Hiatt, Elvis Costello)	WPA (2009); 4X4 (2011)		
2007	Neon Horse	Mark Salomon (Argyle Park/AP2, CHATTERBoX, The Crucified, Stavesacre); Jason Martin (Starflyer 59, The Brothers Martin, Dance House Children); Steve Dail (Project 86, Starflyer 59, Crash Rickshaw)	Neon Horse (2007); Haunted Horse: Songs of Love, Defiance, & Delusion (2009)	Neon Horse was secretive about its membership. Additional members are suspected, but not confirmed.	
2008	Amaranthe	Elize Ryd (Dragonland), (Kamelot); Jake E (Dream Evil), (Dreamland); Andreas Solveström (Ciper System), (Within Y); Olof Mörck (Dragonland), (Nightrage); Morten Løwe Sørensen (Dragonland), (Mercenary), (The Cleansing), (Koldborn); Johan Andreassen (Engel)	Amaranthe (2011); The Nexus (2013)		
2008	Apparatjik	Guy Berryman (Coldplay); Jonas Bjerre (Mew); Magne Furuholmen (a-ha); Martin Terefe	We Are Here (2010); Square Peg in a Round Hole (2012)		
2008	Big Red Machine	Aaron Dessner (The National); Justin Vernon (Bon Iver)	Big Red Machine (2018); How Long Do You Think It's Gonna Last? (2021)		
2008	Chickenfoot	Sammy Hagar (Montrose, HSAS, Van Halen, solo); Joe Satriani (Mick Jagger, Deep Purple, solo); Michael Anthony (Van Halen); Chad Smith (Red Hot Chili Peppers, Glenn Hughes)	Chickenfoot (2009); Chickenfoot III (2011)		
2008	The Civil Wars	Joy Williams; John Paul White	The Civil Wars discography		
2008	Empire of the Sun	Luke Steele (The Sleepy Jackson); Nick Littlemore (Pnau)	Walking on a Dream (2008); Ice on the Dune (2013); Two Vines (2016)		
2008	fun.	Nate Ruess (The Format, solo); Jack Antonoff (Steel Train, Bleachers); Andrew Dost (Anathallo)	Aim and Ignite (2009); Some Nights (2012)		
2008	Fear and the Nervous System	James "Munky" Shaffer (Korn); Billy Gould (Faith No More); Brooks Wackerman (Bad Religion); Steve Krolikowski (Repeater); Leopold Ross (Io Echo); Zac Baird	Fear and the Nervous System (2011)		
2008	Major Lazer	Diplo (solo); Switch – replaced by Jillionaire and Walshy Fire in 2011; Jillionaire – replaced Switch in 2011, replaced by Ape Drums in 2019; Walshy Fire – replaced Switch in 2011; Ape Drums (solo) – replaced Jillionaire in 2019)	Guns Don't Kill People... Lazers Do (2009); Free The Universe (2013); Peace Is the Mission (2015); Music Is the Weapon (2020)		
2008	Mongrel	Andy Nicholson (Arctic Monkeys, Reverend and the Makers); Jon McClure (Reverend and the Makers, Reverend Soundsystem); Drew McConnell (Babyshambles, solo); Matt Helders (Arctic Monkeys, solo)	Better Than Heavy (2009)		
2008	Damnocracy	Sebastian Bach (Skid Row, solo); Ted Nugent (Damn Yankees, solo); Jason Bonham (Bonham, UFO, Foreigner); Evan Seinfeld (Biohazard); Scott Ian (Anthrax)			
2008	Solution .45	Christian Älvestam (Miseration, The Few Against Many, Scar Symmetry); Jani Stefanovic (Am I Blood, Crimson Moonlight, Miseration, Divinefire, The Few Against Many, Renascent); Patrik Gardberg (Divinefire, The Few Against Many); Rolf Pilve (Miseration, Stratovarius); Mikko Härkin (Symfonia, Kotipelto, Sonata Arctica, Mehida); Anders Edlund (The Few Against Many); Tom "Tomma" Gardiner (Hateform, Mors Principium Est)	For Aeons Past (2010)		
2008	Slaughterhouse	Crooked I; Joe Budden; Joell Ortiz; Royce da 5'9"	Slaughterhouse (2009); Slaughterhouse EP (2011); Welcome to: Our House (2012)		
2008	SMV	Stanley Clarke (Return to Forever, Chick Corea, Jeff Beck); Marcus Miller (solo, David Sanborn, Miles Davis); Victor Wooten (solo, Béla Fleck and the Flecktones, Steve Bailey)	Thunder (2008)		
2008	Superband	Lo Ta-yu (solo); Jonathan Lee (producer); Wakin Chau (solo); Chang Chen-yue (solo)	North Bound (2009); Go South (2010)		
2008	Orbs	Dan Briggs (Between the Buried and Me); Adam Fisher (Fear Before); Ashley Jurgemeyer (Abigail Williams)			
2008	United Nations	Geoff Rickly (Thursday); Daryl Palumbo (Glassjaw, Head Automatica); Ben Koller (Converge)	United Nations, 2008		
2008	WTF?	deadmau5; Tommy Lee; Steve Duda; DJ Aero	Chicken (2008)		
2009	Two Tongues	Chris Conley (Saves the Day); Max Bemis (Say Anything); Dave Soloway (Saves the Day); Coby Linder (Say Anything)	Two Tongues (2009)		
2009	Isles & Glaciers	Craig Owens (Chiodos); Jonny Craig (Emarosa); Vic Fuentes (Pierce the Veil); Nick Martin (Underminded); Matt Goddard (Chiodos); Brian Southall (The Receiving End of Sirens); Mike Fuentes (Pierce the Veil)	The Hearts of Lonely People (2009)		
2009	Ov Hell	Shagrath (Dimmu Borgir); King ov Hell (Gorgoroth, God Seed, Sahg, I)	The Underworld Regime (2010)		
2009	Basement Birds	Kav Temperley (Eskimo Joe); Josh Pyke (solo); Kevin Mitchell (Jebediah, solo [as Bob Evans]); Steve Parkin (solo)	Basement Birds (2010)		
2009	Duck Sauce	Armand Van Helden; A-Trak	Greatest Hits (2010)		
2009	Shrinebuilder	Scott "Wino" Weinrich (The Hidden Hand, Spirit Caravan, Saint Vitus, The Obsessed); Al Cisneros (Om, Sleep, Asbestosdeath); Scott Kelly (Neurosis, Tribes of Neurot); Dale Crover (Melvins, Altamont, The Men of Porn)	Shrinebuilder (2009)		
2009	Tinted Windows	Taylor Hanson (Hanson); James Iha (The Smashing Pumpkins); Adam Schlesinger (Fountains of Wayne); Bun E. Carlos (Cheap Trick)	Tinted Windows (2009)		
2009	The Dead Weather	Alison Mosshart (The Kills, Discount); Dean Fertita (Queens of the Stone Age); Jack Lawrence (The Raconteurs, The Greenhornes); Jack White (The White Stripes, The Raconteurs)	Horehound (2009); Sea of Cowards (2010); Dodge and Burn (2015)		
2009	Them Crooked Vultures	Dave Grohl (Scream, Nirvana, Foo Fighters); John Paul Jones (Led Zeppelin); Josh Homme (Kyuss, Queens of the Stone Age, Eagles of Death Metal); Alain Johannes (Queens of the Stone Age, PJ Harvey, Eleven) – touring	Them Crooked Vultures (2009)		
2009	Dead by Sunrise	Chester Bennington (Linkin Park); Ryan Shuck (Orgy, Julien-K); Amir Derakh (Rough Cutt, Orgy, Julien-K); Brandon Belsky (Julien-K); Elias Andra (Julien-K); Anthony Valcic	Out of Ashes (2009)		
2009	Atoms for Peace	Thom Yorke (Radiohead); Flea (The Red Hot Chili Peppers); Nigel Godrich (Radiohead); Joey Waronker (R.E.M, Beck, Smashing Pumpkins); Mauro Refosco (David Byrne, Forro in the Dark)	Amok (2013)		
2009	Doctor Midnight & The Mercy Cult	Hank von Helvete (Turbonegro); Tim Sköld (Marilyn Manson, KMFDM, MDFMK, Shotgun Messiah, Skold); Anders Odden (Cadaver, Satyricon, Celtic Frost, Apoptygma Berzerk, Magenta); Audun Stengel (Apoptygma Berzerk, The Kovenant); David Husvik (Extol)	I Declare: Treason (2011)		
2009	Black Hippy	Kendrick Lamar; Ab-Soul; Jay Rock; Schoolboy Q			
2009	Off!	Keith Morris (Circle Jerks, Black Flag); Dimitri Coats (Burning Brides); Steven Shane McDonald (Redd Kross); Mario Rubalcaba (Hot Snakes, Rocket from the Crypt)	First Four EPs (2010); Off! (2012); Wasted Years (2014)		
2009	We Are the Fallen	Carly Smithson (solo); Ben Moody (Evanescence); John LeCompt (Evanescence); Rocky Gray (Evanescence); Marty O'Brien (Kilgore, Methods of Mayhem, Tommy Lee)	Tear the World Down (2010)		
2010	Broken Bells	James Mercer (The Shins); Brian Burton (solo, Gnarls Barkley, Danger Doom)	Broken Bells (2010); After The Disco, 2014		
2010	Black Country Communion	Glenn Hughes (Trapeze, Deep Purple, Phenomena, Black Sabbath, solo); Joe Bonamassa (Bloodline, solo); Jason Bonham (Virginia Wolf, Bonham, UFO, Foreigner); Derek Sherinian (Dream Theater, Planet X, solo)	Black Country (2010); 2 (2011), Afterglow (2012)		
2010	The Damned Things	Current Members: Andy Hurley (Fall Out Boy); Joe Trohman (Fall Out Boy); Scott Ian (Anthrax); Keith Buckley (Every Time I Die); Dan Andriano (Alkaline Trio); Former Members: Rob Caggiano (Anthrax); Josh Newton (Every Time I Die)	Ironiclast (2010); High Crimes (2019)		
2010	Destroy Rebuild Until God Shows	Craig Owens (Chiodos); Jona Weinhofen (Bring Me the Horizon, I Killed the Prom Queen); Aaron Patrick (All That Remains); Former members: Nick Martin (Underminded, Sleeping With Sirens); Matt Good (From First to Last); Aaron Stern (Matchbook Romance); Adam Russell (Story of the Year)	D.R.U.G.S. (2011)		
2010	Swedish House Mafia	Steve Angello; Axwell; Sebastian Ingrosso	Until One (2010); Until Now (2012); Paradise Again (2022)		
2010	Alex, Jorge y Lena	Álex Ubago; Jorge Villamizar (Bacilos); Lena Burke	Alex, Jorge y Lena (2010)		
2010	How to Destroy Angels	Trent Reznor (Option 30, The Innocent, Exotic Birds, Lucky Pierre, Nine Inch Nails); Mariqueen Maandig (West Indian Girl); Atticus Ross (solo, Nine Inch Nails)	How to Destroy Angels (2010)		
2010	Symfonia	Andre Matos (Angra); Timo Tolkki (Stratovarius); Uli Kusch (Helloween); Jari Kainulainen (Evergrey, Stratovarius); Mikko Härkin (Sonata Arctica)	In Paradisum (2011)		
2010	Steve Taylor & the Perfect Foil/Steve Taylor & the Danielson Foil	Steve Taylor (solo, Chagall Guevara); Peter Furler (solo, Newsboys, Peter Furler Band); John Mark Painter (solo, Fleming and John); Jimmy Abegg (solo, A Ragamuffin Band, Vector, Charlie Peacock); Daniel Smith (Danielson) – joined 2015	Goliath (2014); Wow to the Deadness' (2016); Wow to the Liveness (2016); Ecstatic Delight (2020)		
2010	Diamond Rugs	Consists of members of: Deer Tick; Los Lobos; Black Lips; Dead Confederate; Six Finger Satellite			
2010	The Hit Men	Gerry Polci (The Four Seasons); Don Ciccone (The Critters, The Four Seasons, Tommy James and the Shondells); Lee Shapiro (The Four Seasons); Jimmy Ryan (The Critters, Carly Simon's band)		In function, a partial reunion of Ciccone's previous bands, The Critters and the 1970s lineup of The Four Seasons.	
2011	Mister Heavenly	Honus Honus (Man Man); Nicholas Thorburn (The Unicorns); Joe Plummer (Modest Mouse); Michael Cera (Touring bass player)	Out of Love (2011)		
2011	Serpentine Dominion	George "Corpsegrinder" Fisher (Monstrosity, Cannibal Corpse); Adam Dutkiewicz (Killswitch Engage, Times of Grace); Shannon Lucas (All That Remains, The Black Dahlia Murder)	Serpentine Dominion (2016)		
2011	Wild Flag	Carrie Brownstein (Sleater-Kinney); Janet Weiss (Sleater-Kinney); Mary Timony (Helium); Rebecca Cole (The Minders)	Wild Flag (2011)		
2011	Flying Colors	Mike Portnoy (Dream Theater, Transatlantic); Dave LaRue (Dixie Dregs); Casey McPherson (Alpha Rev); Neal Morse (Transatlantic); Steve Morse (Deep Purple)			
2011	Adrenaline Mob	Mike Portnoy (Dream Theater, Transatlantic); Russell Allen (Symphony X); Mike Orlando (Solo, worked with Zakk Wylde and Bumblefoot); Paul DiLeo; Rich Ward (Stuck Mojo, Fozzy); John Moyer (Disturbed, Union Underground)	Adrenaline Mob (2011)		
2011	Killer Be Killed	Greg Puciato (The Dillinger Escape Plan); Max Cavalera (Soulfly, Cavalera Conspiracy, ex-Sepultura, Nailbomb); Troy Sanders (Mastodon); Dave Elitch (ex-The Mars Volta)	Killer Be Killed (2014)		
2011	Pistol Annies	Miranda Lambert; Ashley Monroe; Angaleena Presley	Hell on Heels (2011); Annie Up (2013); Interstate Gospel (2018)		
2011	Animetal USA	Mike Vescera (Obsession, Loudness, Yngwie Malmsteen, Dr. Sin); Chris Impellitteri (Impellitteri); Rudy Sarzo (Ozzy Osbourne, Quiet Riot, M.A.R.S., Whitesnake, Manic Eden, Dio); Scott Travis (Racer X, Saints or Sinners, Judas Priest, Fight); Jon Dette (Evildead, Testament, Slayer) – replaced Travis in 2012.	Animetal USA (2011); Animetal USA W (2011)		
2011	E-Girls (EXILE Girls)	SAYAKA (f5ve; Happiness); Kaede (f5ve; Happiness); Fujii Karen (Happiness; ShuuKaRen); YURINO (Happiness, Sudannayuzuyully); Suda Anna (Happiness, Sudannayuzuyully); Washio Reina (Flower; Solo); Bando Nozomi (Flower); Sato Harumi (Flower); Ishii Anna; Yamaguchi Nonoka; Takebe Yuzuna (Solo; Sudannayuzuyully; SWEET REVENGE); Former Members: Shizuka (Solo; Dream; Dance Earth Party); Aya (Dream; Dance Earth Party); Ami (Solo; Dream; Dance Earth Party); Sayaka (Solo; Dream); Erie (Dream; Dance Earth Party); MIYUU (f5ve; Happiness); MIMU (Happiness); Sugieda Mayu (Happiness); Kawamoto Ruri (f5ve; Happiness); Mizuno Elina (Flower); Fujii Shuuka (Flower; ShuuKaRen); Shigetome Manami (Flower); Nakajima Mio (Flower); Muto Chiharu (Flower; solo); Ichiki Kyoka (Flower; solo); Takeda Kyoka; Hagio Misato; Hanayama Mizuki; Oishi Miyuu; Inagaki Rio; Vats Mira; Kizu Reina; Ikuta Risa; Nakajima Momoka; Watanabe Marina	Lesson 1 (2013); COLORFUL POP (2014); E.G. TIME (2015); E.G. CRAZY (2017); E.G. 11 (2018)		
2011	Art of Anarchy	John Moyer; Ron "Bumblefoot" Thal; Jon Votta; Vince Votta; Scott Stapp			
2011	Beautiful Eulogy	Braille (solo,); Odd Thomas (solo); Courtland Urbano (solo)	Satellite Kite (2012); Instruments of Mercy (2013)		
2011	SuperHeavy	A. R. Rahman; Damian Marley; Dave Stewart (Eurythmics); Joss Stone; Mick Jagger (The Rolling Stones)	SuperHeavy (2011)		
2011	V.A. Playaz	Timbaland; Magoo; Missy Elliott; Clipse; Skillz; Fam-Lay; Pharrell			
2011	The Winery Dogs	John Sykes (Tygers of Pan Tang, Thin Lizzy, Whitesnake, Blue Murder, solo); Mike Portnoy (Dream Theater, Liquid Tension Experiment, OSI, Transatlantic, Adrenaline Mob); Billy Sheehan (UFO, David Lee Roth, Mr. Big, Niacin, solo); Richie Kotzen (Poison, Vertú, Mr. Big, solo) – replaced Sykes in 2012.	The Winery Dogs (2011); Hot Streak (2015); Dog Years (2017)		
2011	Queen + Adam Lambert	Brian May (Queen); Roger Taylor (Queen); Adam Lambert (solo)			
2011	The Gloaming	Martin Hayes (solo); Iarla Ó Lionáird (solo, Afro Celt Sound System, Pádraigín Ní Uallacháin); Caoimhín Ó Raghallaigh (solo, Amiina, Sam Amidon, The Waterboys, Mick O'Brien); Dennis Cahill (solo); Thomas Bartlett (Doveman, Sam Amidon, The National, Antony and the Johnsons, Martha Wainwright, Glen Hansard, Elysian Fields, Nico Muhly, Chocolate Genius, Inc.)	The Gloaming (2014)		
2012	Dog Blood	Boys Noize; Skrillex (solo, From First to Last)	Middle Finger (2012); Middle Finger, Pt. 2 (2013); Middle Finger, Pt. 2 – The Remixes (2014)		
2012	Galantis	Christian Karlsson (Miike Snow); Linus Eklöw (solo as Style of Eye)	Pharmacy (2015)		
2012	The Halo Method	Ben Moody (Evanescence, We Are the Fallen); Dave Buckner (Papa Roach); Lukas Rossi (Rock Star Supernova, Daylight Division); Josh Newell (In This Moment); Miles McPherson (Look What I Did, Hot Action Cop, Kelly Clarkson, Tonic, Paramore)	Reset (2013)		
2012	Projected	John Connolly (Sevendust); Eric Friedman (Submersed, Creed, Tremonti); Vinnie Hornsby (Sevendust); Scott Phillips (Creed, Alter Bridge)	Human (2012); Ignite My Insanity (2017)		
2012	Solamors	Jason Wisdom (Becoming the Archetype, Death Therapy); Alex Kenis (Aletheian, Becoming the Archetype); Trav Turner (Aletheian, UnTeachers)	Depravity's Demise (2013)		
2013	Czarface	7L (7L & Esoteric); Esoteric (7L & Esoteric, The Demigodz, Army of the Pharaohs); Inspectah Deck (Wu-Tang Clan, The Housegang)	Czarface (2013); Every Hero Needs a Villain (2015)		
2013	Run the Jewels	El-P (Company Flow, The Weathermen); Killer Mike	Run the Jewels (2013); Run the Jewels 2 (2014); Run the Jewels 3 (2016); RTJ4 (2020)		
2013	Wovenwar	Current members: Shane Blay of Oh, Sleeper; Nick Hipa of As I Lay Dying; Josh Gilbert of As I Lay Dying; Jordan Mancino of As I Lay Dying; Former members: Phil Sgrosso of As I Lay Dying	Wovenwar (2014); Honor Is Dead (2016)		
2013	The Full English	Fay Hield (Fay Hield Trio, The Witches of Elswick); Seth Lakeman (solo, Sean Lakeman, Kathryn Roberts, Cara Dillon, Sam Lakeman, The Lakeman Brothers, Equation, Steve Knightley); Martin Simpson (solo, June Tabor, David Hidalgo, Wu Man, The Albion Band); Nancy Kerr (solo, Eliza Carthy, Sandra Kerr, James Fagan, Tim Van Eyken); Sam Sweeney (solo, Hannah James and Sam Sweeney, Kerfuffle, Bellowhead); Rob Harbron; Ben Nicholls (solo, Menlo Park, Seth Lakeman)	The Full English (2013)		
2013	Lindemann (band)	Till Lindemann (Rammstein); Peter Tägtgren (Pain, Hypocrisy)	Skills in Pills (2015)		
2013	Dance Earth Party	Exile Usa (J Soul Brothers, Exile); Exile Tetsuya, Exile the Second, Sandaime J Soul Brothers, Exile); Dream Shizuka (Dream, E-Girls); Former Members: Crystal Kay (Soloist); Exile Nesmith (Nidaime J Soul Brothers, Exile, Exile the Second); Kobayashi Naoki (Nidaime J Soul Brothers, Exile, Sandaime J Soul Brothers); Sekiguchi Mandy (Generations from Exile Tribe, Exile, Honest Boyz); Dream Aya (Dream, E-Girls); Dream Ami (Dream, E-Girls); Dream Erie (Dream, E-Girls)	"Inochi no Rhythm" (2013); "Peace Sunshine"(2014); "Beautiful Name" (2015); "Dreamers' Paradise" (2015); "Neo Zipang ~Utage~" (2016); "To The World" (2016); "Heart of a Lion" (2016); "Popcorn" (2017); "Wave" (2017); "Anuenue" (2018); "Happila" (2018); "I" (2018)		
2013	Hard Working Americans	Todd Snider; Dave Schools (Widespread Panic); Neal Casal (Chris Robinson Brotherhood); Chad Staehly (Great American Taxi); Duane Trucks (Widespread Panic)	Hard Working Americans (2014)		
2013	McBusted	Danny Jones (McFly); Dougie Poynter (McFly); Harry Judd (McFly); Tom Fletcher (McFly); James Bourne (Busted); Matt Willis (Busted)	McBusted (2014)		
2013	I Am Legion	Nik Roos (Noisia); Martijn van Sonderen (Noisia); Thijs de Vlieger (Noisia); Orifice Vulgatron (Foreign Beggars); Metropolis (Foreign Beggars)	I Am Legion (2013)		
2013	The Dead Daisies	• David Lowy • Richard Fortus (Guns N' Roses): Jon Stevens (INXS, Noiseworks); Darryl Jones (The Rolling Stones); Dizzy Reed (Guns N' Roses); Marco Mendoza (Ted Nugent, Blue Murder); Charley Drayton (The Cult, Divinyls, Cold Chisel); John Tempesta (The Cult, Testament, White Zombie); Brian Tichy (Whitesnake, Sass Jordan); Frank Ferrer (Guns N' Roses); Alex Carapetis (Nine Inch Nails); John Corabi (The Scream, Mötley Crüe); Doug Aldrich (Whitesnake); Deen Castronovo (Journey, Hardline)	The Dead Daisies (2013); Revolucion (2015), Make Some Noise (2016); Live & Louder (2017); Burn it Down (2018)		
2013	California Breed	Glenn Hughes (Trapeze, Deep Purple, Black Sabbath); Jason Bonham (Led Zeppelin, Bonham, UFO, Foreigner); Andrew Watt (solo); Tour members: Joey Castillo (Queens of the Stone Age, Eagles of Death Metal)	California Breed (2014)		
2013	TGT	Tyrese; Ginuwine; Tank	"Please Don't Go (The TGT Remix)" (2007); Three Kings (2013)		
2014	The Both	Aimee Mann (Til Tuesday); Ted Leo	The Both (2014)		
2014	Metafive	Yukihiro Takahashi (solo, Yellow Magic Orchestra); Towa Tei (solo, Deee-Lite); Keigo Oyamada (solo, Flipper's Guitar); Yoshinori Sunahara (solo, Denki Groove); Tomohiko Gondo; Leo Imai	Meta (2014); Metaatem (2021)		
2014	The New Basement Tapes	Jim James (My Morning Jacket); Elvis Costello (The Attractions); Marcus Mumford (Mumford & Sons); Taylor Goldsmith (Dawes); Rhiannon Giddens (The Carolina Chocolate Drops)	Lost on the River: The New Basement Tapes (2014)		
2014	No Devotion	Geoff Rickly (Thursday, United Nations); Lee Gaze (Lostprophets); Stuart Richardson (Lostprophets); Former members: Luke Johnson (Beat Union, Lostprophets); Jamie Oliver (Lostprophets); Mike Lewis (Lostprophets, Public Disturbance)	Permanence (2015)		
2014	PRhyme	DJ Premier; Royce da 5'9"	PRhyme (2014)		
2014	Jack Ü	Skrillex (solo, From First to Last); Diplo (solo, Major Lazer)	Skrillex and Diplo Present Jack Ü (2015)		
2014	The Alexanders	Alex Metric; Yuksek	"Don't Miss" (2014); "Pwoin Pwoin Pwoin" (2014)		
2014	Teenage Time Killers	Mick Murphy (My Ruin); Reed Mullin (Corrosion of Conformity); Randy Blythe (Lamb of God); Corey Taylor (Stone Sour, Slipknot); Dave Grohl (Foo Fighters, Nirvana, Probot); Neil Fallon (Clutch, The Company Band, The Bakerton Group); Jello Biafra (Dead Kennedys, The Guantanamo School of Medicine); Matt Skiba (Akaline Trio, Blink-182); Brian Baker (Minor Threat, Bad Religion); Lee Ving (Fear); Jim Rota; Tommy Victor (Prong, Ministry, Danzig, Tapeworm, Argyle Park); Nick Oliveri (Kyuss, Queens of the Stone Age, Dwarves, Vista Chino, Mondo Generator); Aaron Beam; Mike "IX" Williams (Eyehategod); Pete Stahl (Scream, earthlings?, Goatsnake); Greg Anderson (Goatsnake); Vic Bondi (Articles of Faith); Phil Rind; Jason Browning; Karl Agell (Corrosion of Conformity, Leadfoot); Woody Weatherman (Corrosion of Conformity); Mike Dean (Corrosion of Conformity); Clifford Dinsmore; Tairrie B. Murphy (My Ruin); Pat Hoed; London May; Mike Schaefer; Tony Foresta; Trenton Rogers; B Kowalski; Jonny Webber	Teenage Time Killers: Greatest Hits Vol. 1		
2014	Filthy Friends	Corin Tucker (Sleater-Kinney); Peter Buck (R.E.M.); Krist Novoselic (Nirvana); Scott McCaughey (Minus 5, Young Fresh Fellows); Kurt Bloch (Fastbacks,Young Fresh Fellows); Bill Rieflin (Ministry)	"Despierta" (Self-released, October 21, 2016, for 30 Days, 30 Songs); "Any Kind of Crowd"/"Editions of You" (Kill Rock Stars, April 22, 2017, for Record Store Day); Invitation (Kill Rock Stars, August 25, 2017); Emerald Valley (Kill Rock Stars, May 3, 2019)		
2014	FFS	Alex Kapranos (Franz Ferdinand); Nick McCarthy (Franz Ferdinand); Bob Hardy (Franz Ferdinand); Paul Thomson (Franz Ferdinand); Ron Mael (Sparks); Russell Mael (Sparks)	FFS (2015)		
2014	Muzz	Paul Banks (Interpol); Matt Barrick (The Walkmen); Josh Kaufman (Bonny Light Horseman)	Muzz (2020)		
2014	Fleshkiller	Ole Børud (solo, Extol, Schaliach, Selfmindead); Elisha Mullins (The Burial, A Hill to Die Upon, War of Ages); Ole Vistnes (Shining, Tristania, In Vain, Extol); Andreas Skorpe Sjøen (Umpfel); Peter Dalbakk (Schaliach, Vardøger) – 2015–2017, replaced by Mullins	Awaken (2017)		
2014	Saint Asonia	Adam Gontier (Three Days Grace); Mike Mushok (Staind); Cale Gontier (Art of Dying); Cody Watkins (Art of Dying); Former members: Corey Lowery (Switched, Dark New Day, Stereomud, Seether); Rich Beddoe (Finger Eleven); Sal Giancarelli (Staind)	Saint Asonia (2015); Flawed Design (2019)		
2014	Hollywood Vampires	Core members: Alice Cooper (Alice Cooper); Johnny Depp (Rock City Angels, P); Joe Perry (Aerosmith, The Joe Perry Project); Tommy Henriksen (Alice Cooper); Guest artists include: Perry Farrell (Jane's Addiction, Porno for Pyros); Dave Grohl (Nirvana, Foo Fighters); Brian Johnson (AC/DC); Robby Krieger (The Doors); Paul McCartney (The Beatles, Paul McCartney and Wings); Slash (Guns N' Roses, Velvet Revolver); Zak Starkey (The Who, Oasis); Joe Walsh (Eagles)	Hollywood Vampires (September 2015); Rise (2019)		
2014	DNCE	Joe Jonas (Jonas Brothers, solo); Jack Lawless (Jonas Brothers, Ocean Grove); JinJoo Lee (Jonas Brothers, Scarlet Fever); Cole Whittle (Semi Precious Weapons)	DNCE (2016)		
2014	Vltimas	Rune Eriksen (Mayhem, Aura Noir, Mezzerschmitt, Ava Inferi); Flo Mounier (Cryptopsy); David Vincent (Morbid Angel, Terrorizer, Genitorturers)	Something Wicked Marches In (2019)		
2014	Sammy Hagar and the Circle	Sammy Hagar (solo, Van Halen, Chickenfoot, Sammy Hagar and the Waboritas); Vic Johnson (The BusBoys, Sammy Hagar and the Waboritas); Michael Anthony (Van Halen, Chickenfoot); Jason Bonham (Bonham, Led Zeppelin, UFO, Foreigner)			
2014	Dead Cross	Michael Crain (Retox); Justin Pearson (Swing Kids, The Locust, Some Girls, Retox); Dave Lombardo (Slayer, Grip Inc., Philm, Fantômas, Suicidal Tendencies, Misfits, Mr. Bungle, Testament); Mike Patton (solo, Faith No More, Mr. Bungle, Fantômas, Tomahawk, Peeping Tom, Lovage, Kaada/Patton, Hemophiliac, Nevermen); Former Members: Gabe Serbian (The Locust, Cattle Decapitation, Holy Molar, Head Wound City, Zu)	Dead Cross (2017); II (2022)		
2015	BNQT	Eric Pulid; Ben Bridwell; Alex Kapranos; Fran Healy; Jason Lytle			
2016	Nothing Left	Ryan Leitru (For Today); Brandon Leitru (For Today); Danon Saylor (A Bullet for Pretty Boy); Alex Camarena (Silent Planet)	"Hands of Death" (2016)		
2016	DREAMCAR	Davey Havok (AFI); Tony Kanal (No Doubt); Tom Dumont (No Doubt); Adrian Young (No Doubt)	Dreamcar (2017)		
2016	Powerflo	Sen Dog (Cypress Hill); Billy Graziadei (Biohazard); Rogelio Lozano (downset.); Christian Olde Wolbers (Fear Factory); Fernando Schaefer (Worst)	Powerflo (2017)		
2016	Gizmodrome	Stewart Copeland (The Police); Adrian Belew (Frank Zappa, David Bowie, Talking Heads, King Crimson); Mark King (Level 42); Vittorio Cosma (PFM, Elio e le Storie Tese)	Gizmodrome (2017)		
2016	Prophets of Rage	B-Real (Cypress Hill); Chuck D (Public Enemy); Tom Morello (Rage Against the Machine); Tim Commerford (Rage Against the Machine); DJ Lord (Public Enemy); Brad Wilk (Rage Against the Machine)	Prophets of Rage (2017)		
2016	Sinsaenum	Frédéric Leclercq (DragonForce, Heavenly); Stéphane Buriez (Loudblast); Attila Csihar (Tormentor, Mayhem, Aborym, Sunn O))); Heimoth (Seth); Joey Jordison (Slipknot, Murderdolls); Sean Zatorsky (Dååth, Chimaira)	Echoes of the Tortured (2016); Repulsion for Humanity (2018)		
2016	Spiritbox	Courtney LaPlante (Iwrestledabearonce); Mike Stringer (Iwrestledabearonce); Zev Rosenberg (session drummer); Josh Gilbert (As I Lay Dying); Former members: Ryan Loerke (Shreddy Krueger); Bill Crook (Living with Lions)	Eternal Blue (2021)		
2016	Trans-Canada Highwaymen	Chris Murphy (Sloan, Anyway Gang); Craig Northey (Odds, Stripper's Union); Steven Page (Barenaked Ladies, The Vanity Project); Moe Berg (The Pursuit of Happiness)	Explosive Hits Vol. 1 (2023)		
2016	Twenty88	Big Sean (solo); Jhené Aiko (solo)	Twenty88 (2016)		
2016	I Dont Know How but They Found Me	Dallon Weekes (Panic! at the Disco); Ryan Seaman (Falling in Reverse)	Razzmatazz (2020)		
2016	Generation Axe	Steve Vai; Zakk Wylde (Black Label Society, Ozzy Osbourne Band); Yngwie Malmsteen (Yngwie Malmsteen's Rising Force); Nuno Bettencourt (Extreme, Mourning Widows); Tosin Abasi (Animals as Leaders)	Generation Axe — The Guitars That Destroyed the World: Live In China (2019)		
2017	CrazyEightyEight	Jarrod Alonge (Canadian Softball); Lauren Babic (Red Handed Denial); Patty Walters (As It Is)	Released three EPs		
2017	Triple H	Hyuna (Wonder Girls, 4Minute, solo, Trouble Maker); Hui (Pentagon); Dawn (Pentagon, solo)	199X (2017); Retro Futurism (2018)		
2017	End	Brendan Murphy (Counterparts); Will Putney (Fit For An Autopsy); Gregory Thomas (Shai Hulud); Jay Pepito (Reign Supreme); Billy Rymer (The Dillinger Escape Plan)	Splinters from an Ever-Changing Face (2020)		
2017	Inaba / Salas	Koshi Inaba (B'z, solo); Stevie Salas (solo, Hardware,)	Chubby Groove (2017), Maximum Huavo (2020)		
2018	Anyway Gang	Sam Roberts (solo, Sam Roberts Band); Chris Murphy (Sloan); Menno Versteeg (Hollerado); Dave Monks (Tokyo Police Club)	Anyway Gang (2019); Still Anyways (2022)		
2018	The Carters	Beyoncé (solo, Destiny's Child); Jay-Z	Everything Is Love (2018)		
2018	I'm With Her	Sarah Jarosz (solo); Aoife O'Donovan (solo, Crooked Still, Sometymes Why, The Goat Rodeo Sessions); Sara Watkins (solo, Nickel Creek, Mutual Admiration Society, Works Progress Administration, Watkins Family Hour)	See You Around (2018)		
2018	LOONA	HeeJin (Artms, solo); HyunJin (Loossemble, TDYA, Latency); HaSeul (Artms, solo); YeoJin (Loossemble); ViVi (Loossemble); Kim Lip (Artms, Odd Eye Circle, solo); JinSoul (Artms, Odd Eye Circle, solo); Choerry (Artms, Odd Eye Circle, solo); Yves (solo); Chuu (solo); Go Won (Loossemble); HyeJu (Loossemble)	[+ +] (2018); [#] (2020); [12:00] (2020); [&] (2021); Flip That (2022)	Originally debuting as three smaller 'sub units' between March 2017 and May 2018 before debuting as twelve in August 2018, the group splintered into Artms, Loossemble, and two soloists after leaving their old label Blockberry Creative in 2023.	
2018	K/DA	Ahri (Miyeon of (G)I-DLE, Nayeon, Sana, Jihyo, Chaeyoung of TWICE, Bekuh BOOM and Annika Wells); Akali (Soyeon of (G)I-DLE); Evelynn (Madison Beer, Bea Miller and Kim Petras); Kai'Sa (Jaira Burns, Wolftyla, Bekuh BOOM and Aluna)	All Out (2020)		
2018	LSD	Labrinth; Sia; Diplo	Labrinth Sia & Diplo Present... LSD (2019)		
2018	Kids See Ghosts	Kanye West (Child Rebel Soldier, The Throne, solo); Kid Cudi (WZRD, solo)	Kids See Ghosts (2018)		
2018	Machinegum	Fabrizio Moretti (The Strokes); Ian Devaney (Nation of Language); Steve Marion (Delicate Steve); Erin Axtel; Martin Bonventure	Conduit (2019)		
2018	boygenius	Phoebe Bridgers; Julien Baker; Lucy Dacus	the record (2023); boygenius (2018); the rest (2023)		
2018	The Fearless Flyers	Cory Wong (Vulfpeck, solo); Joe Dart (Vulfpeck, The Olllam); Mark Lettieri (Snarky Puppy); Nate Smith	Tailwinds (2020); The Fearless Flyers V (2025); The Fearless Flyers (2018); The Fearless Flyers II (2019); The Fearless Flyers III (2022); The Fearless Flyers IV (2024)		
2019	Kingdem	Rodney P; Ty; Blak Twang	The Kingdem EP (2019)		
2019	SuperM	Taemin (Shinee); Baekhyun (Exo); Kai (Exo); Taeyong (NCT; NCT 127); Mark (NCT; NCT 127, NCT Dream); Ten (NCT; WayV); Lucas (NCT; WayV)	SuperM (2019); Super One (2020)		
2019	Ghetto Sage	Noname (solo); Saba (Pivot Gang, solo); Smino (Zoink Gang, solo)	"Häagen Dazs" (2019)		
2020	The Lucid	Vinnie Dombroski (Sponge); Drew Fortier; David Ellefson (Megadeth); Mike Heller (Raven, Fear Factory)	The Lucid (2021); Saddle Up and Ride (2023)		
2020	Cola	Tim Darcy (Ought); Ben Stidworthy (Ought); Evan Cartwright (U.S. Girls)	Deep in View (2022)		
2021	The Smile	Thom Yorke (Radiohead, Atoms For Peace); Jonny Greenwood (Radiohead); Tom Skinner (Sons Of Kemet, Melt Yourself Down)	* A Light for Attracting Attention (2022)		
2022	L.S. Dunes	Anthony Green (Saosin, Circa Survive); Frank Iero (My Chemical Romance); Travis Stever (Coheed and Cambria); Tim Payne (Thursday); Tucker Rule (Thursday)	Past Lives (2022)		
2023	Elegant Weapons	Richie Faulkner (Judas Priest); Scott Travis (Judas Priest); Rex Brown (Pantera, Down); Ronnie Romero (Rainbow, MSG)	Horns For A Halo (2023)		
2023	El7z Up	Kei (Lovelyz); Yeeun (CLC); Yeoreum (WJSN); Yeonhee (Rocket Punch); Nana (Woo!ah!); Hwiseo (H1-Key); Yuki (Purple Kiss)		The Group is Formed through a Reality Survival Program Queendom Puzzle.	
2026	BOM	Lali; Ale Sergi (Miranda!); Juliana Gattas (Miranda!)	Bailar o Morir (2026)		

=== Groups with fewer single/album releases, live/audio appearances ===
These were often one-show or one-album projects or EPs, though some played more than one show or recorded more than one single or EPs, because all or most members were involved in other bands or groups. Some groups listed were also either a collaborative effort for television specials or may have released one project or a few singles, as well as united one or a few times on an audio recording or live performance appearance.

Founded	Bandor project name	Members	Albums or recordings	Notes	Ref.
1956	Million Dollar Quartet	Elvis Presley; Jerry Lee Lewis; Carl Perkins; Johnny Cash	Impromptu recording session later released as a 47-track compilation.	Without Presley, the group reunited in 1982 (The Survivors Live) and 1986 (Class of '55).	
1966	Eric Clapton's Powerhouse	Eric Clapton (The Yardbirds, John Mayall & the Bluesbreakers, Cream); Paul Jones (Manfred Mann); Jack Bruce (John Mayall & the Bluesbreakers, Manfred Mann, Graham Bond Organisation, Cream); Steve Winwood (The Spencer Davis Group, Traffic); Pete York (The Spencer Davis Group); Ben Palmer (associated with Clapton)	three singles featured on the compilation What's Shakin'		
1967	The Super Super Blues Band	Bo Diddley; Muddy Waters; Little Walter; Howlin' Wolf	Super Blues; The Super Super Blues Band		
1968	The Dirty Mac	John Lennon (The Beatles); Eric Clapton (The Yardbirds, John Mayall & the Bluesbreakers, Cream); Keith Richards (The Rolling Stones); Mitch Mitchell (The Jimi Hendrix Experience)		They performed for the The Rolling Stones Rock and Roll Circus television event	
1968	The Christmas Spirit	Chip Douglas (Modern Folk Quartet, The Turtles, The Monkees); Howard Kaylan (The Turtles, The Mothers of Invention, Flo & Eddie); Mark Volman (The Turtles, The Mothers of Invention, Flo & Eddie); Gram Parsons (International Submarine Band, The Byrds, The Flying Burrito Brothers); Gene Parsons (The Byrds, The Flying Burrito Brothers, Parsons Green); Linda Ronstadt (Stone Poneys); Bobby Kimmel (Stone Poneys); Henry Diltz (Modern Folk Quartet, The Monkees); Cyrus Faryar (Modern Folk Quartet, The Group with No Name); Bessie Griffin (The Gospel Consolators, The Caravans, The Gospel Pearls)	"Christmas Is My Time of Year" b/w "Will You Still Believe in Me"		
1970	Lord Sutch and Heavy Friends	Screaming Lord Sutch (The Savages); Jimmy Page (The Yardbirds, Led Zeppelin, The Honeydrippers, Plant and Page); John Bonham (Led Zeppelin); Jeff Beck (The Yardbirds, The Jeff Beck Group, Beck, Bogert & Appice); Noel Redding (The Jimi Hendrix Experience); Nicky Hopkins (Sweet Thursday, The Rolling Stones); Carlo Little	Smoke and Fire		
1973	Tyrone Shoelaces	Cheech Marin (Cheech & Chong); Tommy Chong (Bobby Taylor & The Vancouvers, Cheech & Chong); George Harrison (The Beatles, solo); Klaus Voormann (Manfred Mann); Jim Keltner (session drummer, later Traveling Wilburys); Carole King (solo); Billy Preston (solo); Nicky Hopkins; Michelle Phillips (The Mamas & The Papas); Darlene Love (solo, The Blossoms); Ronnie Spector (The Ronettes, The Blossoms); Dick "Slyde" Hyde (numerous big bands)	"Basketball Jones"		
1975	National Health	Dave Stewart (Hatfield and the North); Alan Gowen (Gilgamesh); Phil Miller ( Matching Mole, Hatfield and the North); Phil Lee (Gilgamesh); Mont Campbell (Hatfield and the North)			
1976	Dolenz, Jones, Boyce & Hart	Micky Dolenz (The Monkees); Davy Jones (The Monkees); Tommy Boyce (Boyce and Hart, Christopher Cloud); Bobby Hart (Boyce and Hart); Peter Tork (The Monkees) appeared at least once with the group live.	Dolenz, Jones, Boyce & Hart		
1979	The Greedies	Paul Cook (Sex Pistols, The Professionals); Scott Gorham (Thin Lizzy); Steve Jones (Sex Pistols, The Professionals, solo); Phil Lynott (Thin Lizzy, solo)	"A Merry Jingle".	Originally known as The Greedy Bastards	
1980	Million Dollar Band	Roy Clark; Chet Atkins; Jethro Burns; Johnny Gimble (Bob Wills and the Texas Playboys); Boots Randolph; Floyd Cramer; Charlie McCoy; Danny Davis (The Nashville Brass)		Recurring house band on the TV series Hee Haw. Most were session members of The Nashville A-Team and had solo careers as instrumentalists.	
1982	Chequered Past	Michael Des Barres (Detective, Silverhead); Steve Jones (Sex Pistols); Frank Infante (Blondie); Clem Burke (Blondie); Nigel Harrison (Blondie); Tony Fox Sales (Iggy Pop)	Chequered Past (1984)		
1983	The Glove	Robert Smith (The Cure); Steven Severin (Siouxsie and the Banshees)	Blue Sunshine (1983)		
1984	Hindu Love Gods	Warren Zevon; Peter Buck (R.E.M.); Mike Mills (R.E.M.); Bill Berry (R.E.M.)	Hindu Love Gods (1990); Also recorded Sentimental Hygiene under Zevon's name.		
1990	The Gak	Sebastian Bach (Skid Row); James Hetfield (Metallica); Duff McKagan (Guns N' Roses); Axl Rose (Guns N' Roses); Slash (Guns N' Roses); Lars Ulrich (Metallica)		Played two charity concerts in 1990.	
1991	Little Village	Ry Cooder; John Hiatt; Nick Lowe; Jim Keltner	Little Village (1992)		
1992	Mac-Talla	Eilidh Mackenzie; Christine Primrose; Arthur Cormack; Alison Kinnaird; Blair Douglas	Mairidh Gaol is Ceòl		
1992	Praxis	Bill Laswell (Buckethead, The Golden Palominos, Massacre, Painkiller); Buckethead (solo, Deli Creeps, Guns N' Roses); Bernie Worrell (Parliament-Funkadelic); Bryan "Brain" Mantia (Primus, Buckethead, Guns N' Roses); Bootsy Collins (Bootsy's Rubber Band, Funkadelic, Deee-Lite, Parliament, and The JB's); DJ Disk (Bill Laswell, Buckethead); Invisibl Skratch Piklz (solo); John Zorn (Naked City, Masada, Painkiller, Hemophiliac, Weird Little Boy); Mick Harris (Napalm Death); Grand Mixer DXT (Herbie Hancock); Serj Tankian (solo, System of a Down); Mike Patton (solo, Faith No More, Mr. Bungle); Iggy Pop (solo, The Stooges); Cindy Blackman (Pharoah Sanders, Cassandra Wilson, Angela Bofill); Yamantaka Eye (Boredoms); Toshinori Kondo (Tom Cora); Pat Thrall (Beyoncé Knowles, Elton John, Tina Turner, and Dave Stewart); Hakim Bey; Lili Haydn	Transmutation (Mutatis Mutandis); Sacrifist; Metatron; Live in Poland; Transmutation Live; 1984; Mold; Warszawa; Collection; Tennessee 2004; Profanation (Preparation for a Coming Darkness)		
1993	Automatic Baby	Adam Clayton (U2); Larry Mullen, Jr. (U2); Mike Mills (R.E.M.); Michael Stipe (R.E.M.)		One-time performance of U2's "One" during an MTV concert for President Bill Clinton.	
1993	Swing Mob	DeVante Swing (Jodeci); Timbaland; Magoo; Ginuwine; Playa; Stevie J; Jimmy Douglass; Darryl Pearson; Mike "Funky Mike" Jackson; Majik; Maija Max; Bazaar Royale; Chad "Dr. Seuss"; Sista (female R&B quartet); Sugah (female R&B trio)	"Gin & Juice (Remix)" (1995); "Up Jumps Da Boogie" (1997); "Take Away" (2001)		
1994	Bruce-Baker-Moore	Jack Bruce (John Mayall & the Bluesbreakers, Manfred Mann, Graham Bond Organisation, Cream); Ginger Baker (Graham Bond Organisation, Cream, Blind Faith); Gary Moore (Skid Row, Thin Lizzy, solo)	Around the Next Dream		
1994	Argyle Park	Core members: Klayton (Celldweller, CHATTERBoX, Criss Angel, Circle of Dust, Angeldust, Scandroid, Immortal); Chris "Buka" Martello (Soil)	"Drive; He Said (D-Wee Dub)" (1994); "Lonely (Two-Timing Dub)"; "Fanny Pack"; Misguided (1995)		
1994	Black Men United	Aaron Hall; After 7; Al B. Sure!; Boyz II Men; Brian McKnight; Christopher Williams; D.R.S.; D'Angelo (songwriter); Damion Hall; El DeBarge; Gerald LeVert; H-Town; Intro; Joe; Keith Sweat; Lenny Kravitz (guitar); Lil' Joe (from The Rude Boys); Portrait; R. Kelly; Silk; Sovory; Stokley (lead singer of Mint Condition); Tevin Campbell; Tony! Toni! Toné! (Raphael saadiq and Dwayne Wiggins); Usher	"U Will Know" (1994)	Performed lived at the 1995 American Music Awards	
1998	Brandy and Monica	Brandy; Monica	"The Boy Is Mine"; "It All Belongs to Me"		
1998	Stardust	Thomas Bangalter (Daft Punk); Alan Braxe; Benjamin Diamond	"Music Sounds Better with You"		
1998	AP2	Core members: Klayton (Celldweller, CHATTERBoX, Criss Angel, Circle of Dust, Angeldust, Scandroid, Immortal); Dan Leveler (LVL, Immortal); Chris "Buka" Martello (Soil)	Suspension of Disbelief (2000)	Successor to the Argyle Park project.	
1999	The No WTO Combo	Jello Biafra (Dead Kennedys, solo, Lard); Kim Thayil (Soundgarden); Krist Novoselic (Nirvana, Sweet 75); Gina Mainwal (Sweet 75)	Live from the Battle in Seattle (1999)		
2000	The Word	John Medeski (Medeski, Martin & Wood); Robert Randolph (Robert Randolph and the Family Band); Luther Dickinson (North Mississippi Allstars, The Black Crows); Chris Chew (North Mississippi Allstars); Cody Dickinson (North Mississippi Allstars)	"The Word" (2001)		
2000	Kelly Price & Friends	Kelly Price; Dru Hill; Montell Jordan; Case; Playa; Aaron Hall; LovHer; Kandice Love	"Love Sets You Free" (2000)		
2001	Oysterhead	Trey Anastasio (Phish); Les Claypool (Primus); Stewart Copeland (Curved Air, The Police)	The Grand Pecking Order (2001)		
2002	Frou Frou	Imogen Heap (solo); Guy Sigsworth (multiple collaborations)	Details (2002)		
2002	Planet Us	Sammy Hagar (Van Halen, Montrose); Michael Anthony (Van Halen); Neal Schon (Journey); Deen Castronovo (Journey); Joe Satriani (solo, Deep Purple)	"Vertigo"; "Peeping Through a Hole"		
2004	Probot	Dave Grohl (Scream, Nirvana, Foo Fighters); Kim Thayil (Soundgarden); Cronos (Venom); Max Cavalera (Sepultura, Soulfly); Lemmy (Motörhead); Mike Dean (C.O.C.); Kurt Brecht (D.R.I.); Lee Dorrian (Cathedral, Napalm Death); Scott "Wino" Weinrich (Saint Vitus); Tom G. Warrior (Celtic Frost); Denis "Snake" Bélanger (Voivod); Eric Wagner (Trouble); King Diamond (King Diamond, Mercyful Fate); Jack Black (Tenacious D); Bubba Dupree (Void); Erol Unala (Celtic Frost)	Probot (2004)	Features Dave Grohl playing most of the instruments, along with one of his favorite heavy metal/punk rock vocalists on each track.	
2004	Tak Matsumoto Group	Tak Matsumoto (B'z, solo); Eric Martin (415/Eric Martin Band, Mr. Big, solo); Jack Blades (Night Ranger, Damn Yankees)	TMG I (2004)		
2005	The Toppers	René Froger (solo); Gerard Joling (solo); Jeroen van der Boom (solo); Jan Smit (Klubbb3, solo); Gordon Heuckeroth (Los Angeles The Voices, solo)	"Shine" (2009)	The song was the Dutch entry for the Eurovision Song Contest 2009.	
2005	Men with Banjos (who Know How to Use Them)	Steve Martin (Toot Uncommons, Steep Canyon Rangers); Earl Scruggs (Foggy Mountain Boys, solo); Pete "Dr. Banjo" Wernick; Tony Ellis; Charles Wood; Paul Shaffer (The Blues Brothers, World's Most Dangerous Band)		Performed at the 2005 New Yorker Festival and on Late Show with David Letterman. An earlier incarnation of the Martin-Scruggs collaboration, 2001's "Earl Scruggs and Friends," featured a number of other prominent musicians.	
2006	Tipton, Entwistle & Powell	Glenn Tipton (Judas Priest); John Entwistle (The Who); Cozy Powell (Rainbow, Black Sabbath, Michael Schenker Group)	Edge of the World (2006)		
2006	The Good, the Bad & the Queen	Damon Albarn (Blur, Gorillaz); Tony Allen (Fela Kuti, solo); Paul Simonon (The Clash, Havana 3am); Simon Tong (The Verve, The Shining, Gorillaz); Danger Mouse (Gnarls Barkley, Gorillaz, Beck)	The Good, the Bad & the Queen (2007); Merrie Land (2018)		
2006	LT united	Andrius Mamontovas; Marijonas Mikutavičius; Victor Diawara; Saulius Urbonavičius; Arnoldas Lukošius; Eimantas Belickas	"We Are the Winners"	Formerd to represent Lithuania in the Eurovision Song Contest 2006	
2007	Robert Plant and Alison Krauss	Robert Plant (Led Zeppelin); Alison Krauss (solo, with Union Station); Sonic’s Rendezvous Band; Fred Smith; Scott Morgan; Gary Rasmussen; Scott Asheton	Raising Sand (2007); Raise the Roof (2021)		
2007	S.K.I.N.	Yoshiki (X Japan, Globe); Gackt (Malice Mizer, solo); Sugizo (Luna Sea, X Japan, Juno Reactor, solo); Miyavi (Dué le Quartz, solo)		The band gave its debut performance on June 29, 2007, at the Anime Expo in Long Beach, California.	
2007	Bow Wow & Omarion	Bow Wow (solo artist); Omarion (B2K)	Face Off (2007)	Initially collaborated with the single "Let Me Hold You" off Bow Wow's album in 2005.	
2008	Fear and the Nervous System	James Shaffer (Korn); Billy Gould (Faith No More); Krolikowski (Bad Religion); Wackerman (Io Echo)	Fear and the Nervous System (2012)		
2008	Heads of State (H.O.S.)	Bobby Brown; Ralph Tresvsant; Johnny Gill		Spinoff and reincarnation of the group New Edition	
2009	Operation Aloha	Dajon Everett (Gomez); Ian Ball (Gomez); Olly Peacock (Gomez); James Valentine (Maroon 5); Jesse Carmichael (Maroon 5); Sam Farrar (Phantom Planet); Fil Krohnengold; Nadav Kahn; Charles Danek; Mathew Chaney; Maureen Wray-McCann; Saam Gabbay; Will Nash; Christopher Wray-McCann	Operation Aloha (2009)		
2009	The White Album Concert	Tim Rogers (You Am I); Josh Pyke; Chris Cheney (The Living End); Phil Jamieson (Grinspoon)		Toured Australia with the show The White Album Concert in 2009, to commemorate the 40th anniversary of the release of The Beatles' classic album	
2010	NKOTBSB	New Kids on the Block; Backstreet Boys	NKOTBSB (2011)		
2013	Device	David Draiman of Disturbed; Geno Lenardo of Filter	Device (2013)		
2013	Fight or Flight	Dan Donegan of Disturbed; Mike Wengren of Disturbed; Dan Chandler of Evans Blue; Sean Corcoran; Jeremy Jayson	A Life by Design? (2013)		
2014	The Impossible Orchestra	Brian Wilson (solo, The Beach Boys, California Music, The Wilsons); BBC Concert Orchestra; Ethan Johns; Martin James Bartlett; Pharrell Williams (solo, The Neptunes, N.E.R.D., Child Rebel Soldier); Emeli Sandé; Elton John; Lorde; Chris Martin (solo, Coldplay); Florence Welch (solo, Florence and the Machine); Kylie Minogue; Stevie Wonder; Eliza Carthy (solo, The Watersons, The Waterdaughters, Nancy Kerr, Waterson–Carthy, Blue Murder, The Imagined Village); Nicola Benedetti; Jools Holland (solo, Squeeze, Jools Holland's Rhythm and Blues Orchestra); Brian May (solo, Smile, Queen, Phenomena, G3, Queen + Paul Rodgers, Anita Dobson, Kerry Ellis, Queen + Adam Lambert); Jake Bugg; Katie Derham; Tees Valley Youth Choir; Alison Balsom; One Direction; Jaz Dhami; Paloma Faith; Chrissie Hynde (solo, The Pretenders, JP, Chrissie & the Fairground Boys; Johnny Moped, The Moors Murderers); Jamie Cullum; Baaba Maal; Danielle de Niese; Dave Grohl (solo, Nirvana, Foo Fighters, Scream, Dain Bramage, Probot, Tony Iommi, Queens of the Stone Age, Them Crooked Vultures, Tenacious D, Late!, Ghost); Sam Smith		One-time collaboration to launch BBC Music, performed "God Only Knows"	
2014	Scott O)))	Scott Walker; Gregg Anderson (Sunn O)))); Tos Nieuwenhuizen (Sunn O)))); Stephen O'Malley (Sunn O))))	Soused (2014)		
2015	Genealogy	Essaï Altounian; Tamar Kaprelian; Vahe Tilbian; Stephanie Topalian; Mary-Jean O'Doherty Basmadjian; Inga Arshakyan	Singles: "Face the Shadow"	Formed to represent Armenia in the Eurovision Song Contest 2015.	
2015	Unnamed Supergroup	Liam Gallagher (Oasis); Roger Daltrey (The Who); Paul Arthurs (Oasis); Jay Mehler (Kasabian, Beady Eye); Ian Broudie (The Lightning Seeds)		One-off performance for the 2015 comeback episode of TFI Friday. The group performed My Generation by The Who. Formed in July 2017 in Milan, Italy	
2016	Y TEEN	Shownu (Monsta X); Wonho (Monsta X); Minhyuk (Monsta X); Kihyun (Monsta X); Hyungwon (Monsta X); Joohyun (Monsta X); I.M (Monsta X); SeolA (WJSN); EXY (WJSN); Soobin (WJSN); Eunseo (WJSN); Cheng Xiao (WJSN); Yeoreum (WJSN); Dayoung (WJSN)	"Do Better" (2016)		
2017	RSO	Richie Sambora (Bon Jovi); Orianthi (solo, Michael Jackson, Alice Cooper)	Rise (2017); Making History (2018); Radio Free America (2018)		
2018	August Greene	Common; Robert Glasper; Karriem Riggins	August Greene (2018)		
2018	LSD	Labrinth; Sia; Diplo	Labrinth, Sia & Diplo Present... LSD (2019)		
2018	The First Ladies of Bluegrass	Alison Brown; Becky Buller; Sierra Hull; Missy Raines; Molly Tuttle		Group featuring the first women to win each of the Instrumentalist of the Year categories at the IBMA Awards.	
2018	RBRM	Ricky Bell; Bobby Brown; Ronnie DeVoe; Michael Bivins		3rd spinoff and reincarnation New Edition	
2018	Deadland Ritual	Franky Perez (solo, Scars on Broadway); Steve Stevens (solo, Billy Idol, Bozzio Levin Stevens, Kings of Chaos, Neurotic Outsiders); Geezer Butler (Black Sabbath, Heaven & Hell, GZR); Matt Sorum (Guns N' Roses, Velvet Revolver, The Cult, Hollywood Vampires)	"Down in Flames" (2018); Broken and Bruised (2019)		
2019	The Highwomen	Brandi Carlile; Amanda Shires; Maren Morris; Natalie Hemby	The Highwomen (2019)		
2020	SSAK3	Yoo Jae-suk; Lee Hyori; Rain	"In Summer"; "In The Beach"; "Play That Summer"	The First South Korean supergroup formed on the MBC variety show Hangout with Yoo.	
2020	Refund Sisters	Uhm Jung Hwa; Lee Hyori; Jessi; Hwasa (Mamamoo)	"Don't Touch Me"	Formed by the variety show Hangout with Yoo and is a spin-off of SSAK3.	
2020	Echobats	Tony Harnell (TNT, Starbreaker, Skid Row); Joel Hoekstra (Night Ranger, Whitesnake); James LoMenzo (White Lion, Pride & Glory, Slash's Snakepit, Black Label Society, Megadeth); Matt Starr (Ace Frehley, Burning Rain, Mr. Big); Eric Levy (Night Ranger)	"Save Me From Loving You" (2020)		
2021	Silk Sonic	Bruno Mars; Anderson .Paak	An Evening with Silk Sonic (2021)		
2021	BluPrint	Shamari DeVoe (Blaque); Kiely Williams (3LW, Cheetah Girls); Felisha King (Cherish); Fallon King (Cherish); Pamela Long (Total) -; Televised members before disbanding include: Nivea; Aubrey O'Day (Danity Kane); Irish & LeMisha Grinstead (702)	Blueprint (2021)	Formed as a collaboration for BET Presents: The Encore	
2021	New Edition & NKOTB	New Edition; New Kids on the Block		Collaborated as a special tribute medley performance dedicated to their hometown of Boston	
2022	Got the Beat	BoA; Taeyeon (Girls' Generation); Hyoyeon (Girls' Generation); Seulgi (Red Velvet); Wendy (Red Velvet); Karina (Aespa); Winter (Aespa)	"Step Back" (2022); Stamp on It (2023)		
2022	f5ve (Formerly known as SG5)	Ariiso Miyuu (Happiness; E-Girls); Kawamoto Ruri (Happiness; E-Girls); Nagatomo Sayaka (Happiness; E-Girls); Dobashi Kaede (Happiness; E-Girls); Yokoi Rui (soloist; iScream)	"Firetruck" (2023); "Lettuce" (2024); "Underground" (2024)		
2022	3rd Secret	Krist Novoselic (Nirvana, Giants in the Trees); Matt Cameron (Soundgarden, Pearl Jam); Kim Thayil (Soundgarden); Jon "Bubba" Dupree (Void); Jillian Raye (Giants in the Trees); Jennifer Johnson (Giants in the Trees)	3rd Secret (2022)		
2022	The Frontmen	Richie McDonald (Lonestar); Larry Stewart (Restless Heart); Tim Rushlow (Little Texas)		Appeared on the Grand Ole Opry in 2022 as part of its yearlong 1990s celebration	
2022	R.S.V.P.	Ray J; Sammie; Bobby V / Valen (solo artist, formerly MISTA); Pleasure P (solo artist, formerly Pretty Ricky)	"Money Everywhere" (December, 2022)	Challengers on the musical streaming platform series Verzuz	
2022	The Last Rockstars	Yoshiki (X Japan, Globe); Hyde (L'arc-en-Ciel, Vamps, solo); Sugizo (Luna Sea, X Japan, Juno Reactor, solo); Miyavi (Dué le Quartz, solo)			
2023	Kx5	Deadmau5; Kaskade	Kx5 (2023)		
2023	¥$	Kanye West; Ty Dolla Sign	I		
2025	The Mock-Ups	Gerard Way (My Chemical Romance); Aimee Interrupter (The Interrupters); Kevin Bivona (The Interrupters, The Transplants); Jesse Bivona (The Interrupters); Michael Schulz (Fender)	"I Wanna Know Your Name" (2025)		
2026	Nine Inch Noize	Trent Reznor (Option 30, The Innocent, Exotic Birds, Lucky Pierre, Nine Inch Nails, How to Destroy Angels); Atticus Ross (solo, Nine Inch Nails, How to Destroy Angels); Boys Noize; Mariqueen Maandig (West Indian Girl)	Nine Inch Noize		

== Charity supergroups ==
Charity groups are usually one-shot projects, organized to create a charity record to raise money or awareness for a cause or charity. Notable examples are the various charity supergroups which formed in response to the 1983–85 famine in Ethiopia, initiated by Band Aid which recorded "Do They Know It's Christmas?" in 1984, such as USA for Africa ("We Are the World") and Northern Lights ("Tears Are Not Enough"), as well as the 1986 heavy metal project Hear 'n Aid.

== Progressive rock supergroups ==
Progressive rock is a genre of rock music that expands on rock music with influences from jazz, folk, classical, and other styles of music.
