= Wiitala =

Wiitala is a surname. Notable people with the surname include:

- Steve Wiitala (born 1942), American politician from Nebraska
- Unto Wiitala (1925–2019), Finnish professional ice hockey player

== See also ==
- The Wiitala Brothers (Christopher and Trevor Wiitala), an American rock band
