= Supergroup (music) =

Band whose members were successful in prior acts

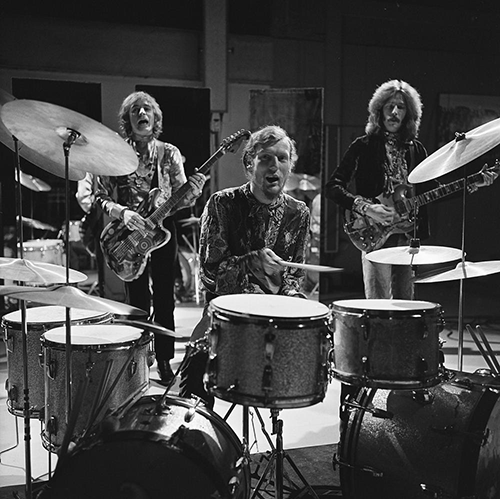
Cream has been credited as the first supergroup.

A supergroup is a musical group formed of members who are already successful as solo artists or as members of other successful groups. The term became popular in the late 1960s when members of already successful rock groups recorded albums together, after which they normally disbanded. Charity supergroups, in which prominent musicians perform or record together in support of a particular cause, have been common since the 1980s. The term is most common in the context of rock and pop music, but it has occasionally been applied to other musical genres. For example, opera stars the Three Tenors (José Carreras, Plácido Domingo, and Luciano Pavarotti) and hip hop duos Kids See Ghosts (Kanye West and Kid Cudi) and Bad Meets Evil (Eminem and Royce da 5'9") all have been called supergroups.

A supergroup sometimes forms as a side project for a single recording project or other ad hoc purposes, with no intention that the group will remain together afterwards. In other instances, the group may become the primary focus of the members' career.

== History ==
Rolling Stone editor Jann Wenner credited British rock band Cream, which came together in 1966, as the first supergroup. Eric Clapton, formerly of rock band The Yardbirds and blues rock band John Mayall & the Bluesbreakers; Jack Bruce, formerly of jazz/rhythm and blues band the Graham Bond Organisation (GBO) and John Mayall & the Bluesbreakers; and Ginger Baker, formerly of the GBO, formed the band in 1966, recorded four albums, and disbanded in 1968. Guitarist Clapton and drummer Baker went on to form Blind Faith, another blues rock supergroup which recruited former Spencer Davis Group and Traffic singer, keyboardist, and guitarist Steve Winwood and Family bassist Ric Grech. The group recorded one studio album before disbanding less than a year after formation. And in 1970 bassist and vocalist Jack Bruce joined the Tony Williams Lifetime (formed the previous year), composed of three famous Miles Davis alumni: drummer Tony Williams, guitarist John McLaughlin and keyboardist Khalid Yasin (né Larry Young).

The term may have come from the 1968 album Super Session with Al Kooper, Mike Bloomfield, and Stephen Stills. The coalition of Crosby, Stills, Nash & Young (formerly Crosby, Stills & Nash) in 1969 is another early example, given the success of their prior bands (the Byrds, Buffalo Springfield, and the Hollies respectively).

While the practice had declined by the 80s, in 1985 country superstars Johnny Cash, Willie Nelson, Kris Kristofferson and Waylon Jennings formed the first country supergroup, The Highwaymen, going on to achieve three chart singles. Perhaps the most decorated line-up, the supergroup Traveling Wilburys was formed in 1988, consisting of Bob Dylan, George Harrison, Jeff Lynne, Roy Orbison and Tom Petty.

In the late 1990s and early 2000s, supergroups such as A Perfect Circle, Audioslave and Velvet Revolver made their mark. A Perfect Circle was created in 1999 by Billy Howerdel and Tool vocalist Maynard James Keenan. Audioslave was created in 2001, composed of ex-members of Rage Against the Machine and Chris Cornell from Soundgarden. The members of Guns N' Roses and Scott Weiland from Stone Temple Pilots came together to form Velvet Revolver in 2002. This is a time when supergroups were experiencing a revival; established musicians looked for new platforms to express themselves.

In 2013, British pop rock bands McFly and Busted combined to form McBusted, before splitting in 2015. A 2015 example of a supergroup is FFS, a collaboration between Scottish indie rock band Franz Ferdinand and American art rock band Sparks. Other prominent examples include Atoms for Peace, SuperHeavy, and Boygenius.

== Criticism of the expression ==
The very definition of a supergroup hinges on the members already having been "successful". This itself is a subjective term, though metrics such as career earnings, records sold, number of commercial hit songs written and musician longevity can all be used to establish the objective success of a musical band and its individual members.

Tyler Golsen in Far Out writes that "Today, the term 'supergroup' has something of a negative connotation. It usually signifies a short-term vanity project that attempts to profit off members' reputations with their past works".

In 1974, a Time magazine article titled "Return of a Supergroup" quipped that the supergroup was a "potent but short-lived rock phenomenon" which was an "amalgam formed by the talented malcontents of other bands". The article acknowledged that groups such as Cream and Blind Faith "played enormous arenas and made megabucks, and sometimes megamusic", with the performances "fueled by dueling egos". However, while this "musical infighting built up the excitement ... it also made breakups inevitable."

== See also ==
- All-star
- Ensemble cast
- List of musical supergroups
