= Sky discography =

- Studio albums: 7
- Live albums: 2
- Compilation albums: 10
- Singles: 15
- Video albums: 4
- Box sets: 2

This article is the discography of English/Australian instrumental rock group Sky.

== Albums ==
=== Studio albums ===
Year	Title	Details	Peak chart positions									Certifications (sales thresholds)
Year	Title	Details	UK	AUS	AUT	GER	NL	NOR	NZ	SWE	US	Certifications (sales thresholds)
1979	Sky	Released: 4 May 1979; Label: Ariola	9	10	—	—	—	—	38	—	—	AUS: Platinum; UK: Platinum
1980	Sky 2	Released: 18 April 1980; Label: Ariola	1	4	5	7	8	18	11	33	125	AUS: Platinum; UK: Platinum
1981	Sky 3	Released: 20 March 1981; Label: Ariola	3	7	4	39	31	11	39	19	181	UK: Gold
1982	Sky 4: Forthcoming	Released: March 1982; Label: Ariola	7	24	—	—	—	18	—	43	—	UK: Gold
1983	Cadmium	Released: 25 November 1983; Label: Ariola	44	30	—	—	—	—	—	45	—	UK: Silver
1985	The Great Balloon Race	Released: April 1985; Label: Epic	63	—	—	—	—	—	—	—	—	
1987	Mozart	Released: November 1987; Label: Mercury; With the Academy of St. Martin-in-the-Fields, conducted by Neville Marriner	—	92	—	—	—	—	—	—	—	
"—" denotes releases that did not chart or were not released

=== Live albums ===
Year	Title	Details	Peak chart positions				Certifications (sales thresholds)
Year	Title	Details	UK	AUS	NOR	SWE	Certifications (sales thresholds)
1983	Sky Five Live	Released: 14 January 1983; Label: Ariola	14	16	23	43	UK: Silver
2002	Live in Nottingham	Released: 2002; Label: Classic Rock Productions; Also released on DVD	—	—	—	—	
"—" denotes releases that did not chart or were not released

=== Compilation albums ===
Year	Title	Details	Peak chart positions		Certifications (sales thresholds)
Year	Title	Details	UK	AUS	Certifications (sales thresholds)
1984	Masterpieces: The Very Best of Sky	Released: April 1984; Label: Telstar/Ariola	15	13	AUS: Gold; UK: Gold
1988	Sky Trails	Released: 1988; Label: Arista; Australasia-only release	—	—	
1989	Classic Sky	Released: 11 December 1989; Label: Ariola	—	—	
1992	The Best of Sky	Released: 1992; Label: Arista/BMG; Australia-only release	—	—	
1994	The Best of Sky	Released: 8 August 1994; Label: Music Club	—	—	
1994	Sky Writing (Best Of...)	Released: 1994; Label: Music De Luxe	—	—	
1998	Squared	Released: December 1998; Label: Snapper Music	—	—	
2004	Anthology	Released: May 2004; Label: Sanctuary	—	—	
2015	Toccata – An Anthology	Released: 27 November 2015; Label: Esoteric Recordings	—	—	
2018	Carillon: The Singles Collection 1979–1987	Released: 28 September 2018; Label: Esoteric Recordings	—	—	
"—" denotes releases that did not chart or were not released

=== Box sets ===
Year	Title	Details
1992	Sky	Released: 1992; Label: Music Club; Includes the first three studio albums
2018	The Studio Albums 1979–1987	Released: 30 March 2018; Label: Esoteric Recordings; Includes all 7 studio albums, plus a DVD of Live in Nottingham

== Singles ==
Year	Single	Peak chart positions						Album
Year	Single	UK	AUS	GER	IRE	NL	US	Album
1979	"Cannonball"	—	—	—	—	—	—	Sky
1979	"Carillon"	—	—	—	—	—	—	Sky
1980	"Toccata"	5	22	13	16	16	83	Sky 2
1980	"Hotta" (Australia-only release)	—	—	—	—	—	—	Sky 2
1980	"Dies Irae"	—	—	—	—	—	—	Non-album single
1981	"Moonroof" (Australia-only release)	—	—	—	—	—	—	Sky 3
1982	"Masquerade"	—	—	—	—	—	—	Sky 4: Forthcoming
1982	"My Giselle"	—	—	—	—	—	—	Sky 4: Forthcoming
1983	"The Animals (Part One)"	—	—	—	—	—	—	Sky Five Live
1983	"Troika"	—	—	—	—	—	—	Cadmium
1984	"Fool on the Hill"	—	—	—	—	—	—	Non-album single
1984	"A Girl in Winter" (UK promo-only release)	—	—	—	—	—	—	Masterpieces: The Very Best of Sky
1985	"Desperate for Your Love"	—	—	—	—	—	—	The Great Balloon Race
1985	"Night Sky"	—	—	—	—	—	—	The Great Balloon Race
1987	"The Marriage of Figaro: Overture" (UK promo-only release)	—	—	—	—	—	—	Mozart
"—" denotes releases that did not chart or were not released

== Videos ==
=== Video albums ===
Year	Title	Details
1982	Sky at Westminster Abbey	Released: Spring 1982; Label: BBC Video; Medium: VHS, LaserDisc; Live material filmed on 24 February 1981
2001	Live in Nottingham	Released: Spring 2001; Label: Classic Rock Legends; Medium: DVD; Live material filmed in 1991
2005	Sky in Bremen	Released: July 2005; Label: Quantum Leap; Medium: DVD; Live material filmed in 1979 (although credited as 1980)
2009	Where Opposites Meet	Released: 14 April 2009; Label: Alpha Centauri Entertainment; Medium: DVD; Netherlands-only release
