= Wackerman =

Wackerman is a surname. Notable people with the surname include:

- Brooks Wackerman (born 1977), American musician and songwriter
- Chad Wackerman (born 1960), American musician
