= The Wiitala Brothers =

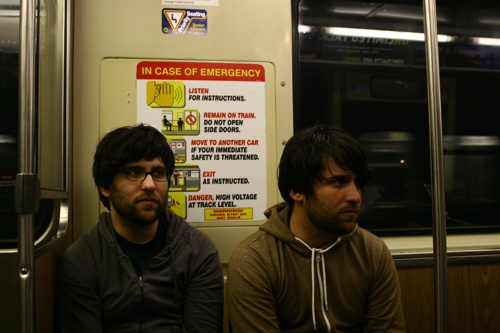
- The Wiitala Brothers on the CTA

Background information
- Origin: Chicago, Illinois
- Genres: Rock, Alternative rock, Indie rock
- Years active: 2005–present
- Labels: None
- Members: Christopher Wiitala; Trevor Wiitala
- Website: The Wiitala Brothers official website

The Wiitala Brothers are a rock duo from Chicago composed of fraternal twin brothers Christopher and Trevor Wiitala.

== Background ==
They have been playing music together in some way or another for pretty much their entire lives, first with friends in school and then with hardcore band The Blamed. Shortly after joining The Blamed they began writing songs together as an outlet for the music they wanted to hear and when The Blamed disbanded, Christopher and Trevor decided to focus on their own material.

From their official website: "For as long as they can remember The Wiitala Brothers have been playing music in one form or another. Having been raised on music full of passion and melody, they continue to do so the best way they know how."

== Bad Blood ==
After years of writing and perfecting their songs, they self-released their debut record Bad Blood. The record deals primarily with Christopher's battle with Hepatitis C, during which the majority of the songs were written.

== Press ==
The Onion A.V. Club states "Bad Blood could be qualified as minimalist indie pop-rock, but it’s something much more effective than that might suggest. The duo’s stark guitars and lingering vocals tend to waft around, electrifying the air with their simplicity. So it shouldn’t matter much that they sound remarkably like Coldplay."

UK music blog Alter The Press says "Wiitala Brothers are pissed off at the world but instead of screaming about it they are penning some really heart-felt songs, which are incredibly well written and make the point more effective."
