= Laura Wright (singer) =

British soprano (born 1990)

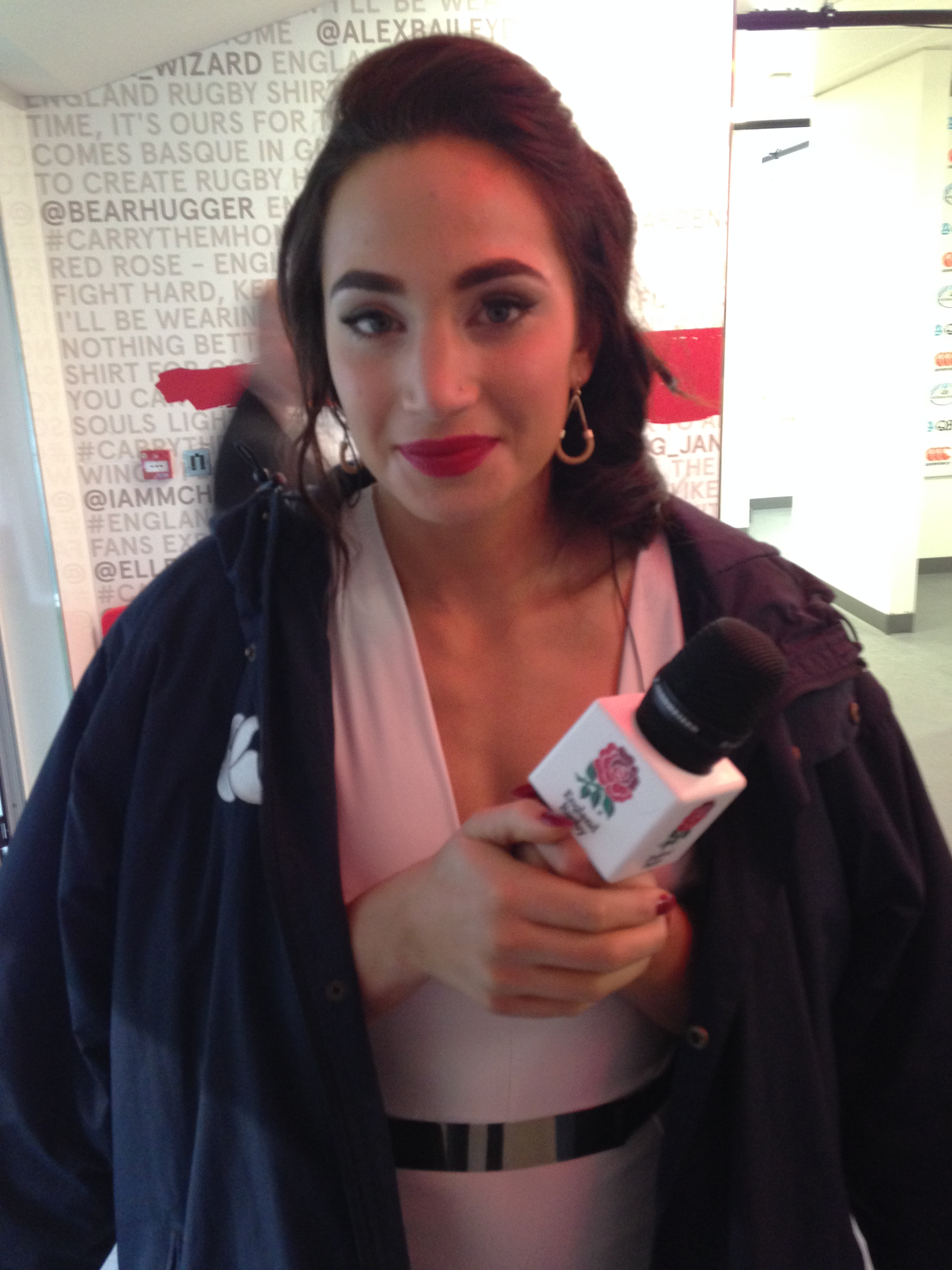
- Wright about to perform the national anthem at Twickenham, 2013

Background information
- Born: Laura Kathryn Wright; 17 June 1990 (age 36); Framsden, Suffolk, England
- Occupation: Singer
- Years active: 2005–present
- Formerly of: All Angels

Laura Kathryn Wright (born 17 June 1990) is an English mezzo-soprano. She is a classical-popular crossover singer who performs classical and operatic music, popular songs, musical theatre, and folk songs.

== Early life ==
Wright was born in Suffolk, and grew up in Framlingham. She won a scholarship to attend the fee-paying Framlingham College. Wright has three brothers. She trained to county level in hockey, netball, tennis and javelin.

== Singing career ==
At the age of 14, Wright was BBC Radio 2 and Songs of Praise's Chorister of the Year. At the age of 16, Wright joined the group All Angels, before later gaining success as a solo singer. She was England Rugby's first official anthem singer, and has performed at men's and women's rugby matches at Twickenham. Wright has been a regular at the NFL matches and has performed at Rugby League, The Carnegie Challenge Cup Final, WSB Boxing, polo, the Carling Cup Final, The Championship Play-off Final and the FA Cup Final. In April 2016, she performed at The Grand National and, in July, she was the official anthem singer at the British Grand Prix.

In 2016, she wrote "Heroes"; the first official anthem of the England Women's Cricket team. She was also the first Ambassador for the Kia Women's Cricket League. Wright performed at the opening ceremony for Prince Harry's inaugural Invictus Games where she debuted a new piece she wrote "Invincible", from her album Sound of Strength.

Wright was the first mezzo-soprano to perform at the Olympic Stadium and has duetted with Donny Osmond for Children in Need.

Wright was involved in the Diamond Jubilee celebrations, with her song "Stronger as One", which secured a No. 1 chart position on Gary Barlow's Sing album.

On 10 September 2022, after the death of Queen Elizabeth II, Wright sang "God Save the King" at the start of the third Test Match between England and South Africa at The Oval. This was the first time that this version of the National Anthem had been officially sung at a sporting event in 70 years.

== Awards and recognition ==
In 2012, Wright was nominated for a Classical Brit Award, and received the PPL Classical Award at the Nordoff-Robbins 02 Silver Clef Awards that same year. Wright was later an ambassador for the Nordoff-Robbins music therapy charity, and also an ambassador for Arthritis Research UK, having been diagnosed with septic arthritis as a child. She has also been an ambassador for SportsAid and for the Invictus Games.

== Discography ==
=== Solo (albums) ===
- 2011: The Last Rose (UK Albums Chart No. 24; Classical Charts No. 1)
- 2012: Glorious (UK Albums Chart No. 52)
- 2014: The Sound of Strength

=== With All Angels (albums) ===
- 2006: All Angels
- 2007: Into Paradise
- 2009: Fly Away

=== Featured Artist ===
- 2012: "Stronger As One" (Sing)
- 2014: "Don't Give Up" (The Soundtrack of My Life)
