= Timothy West =

English actor (1934–2024)

Timothy West CBE FRSA
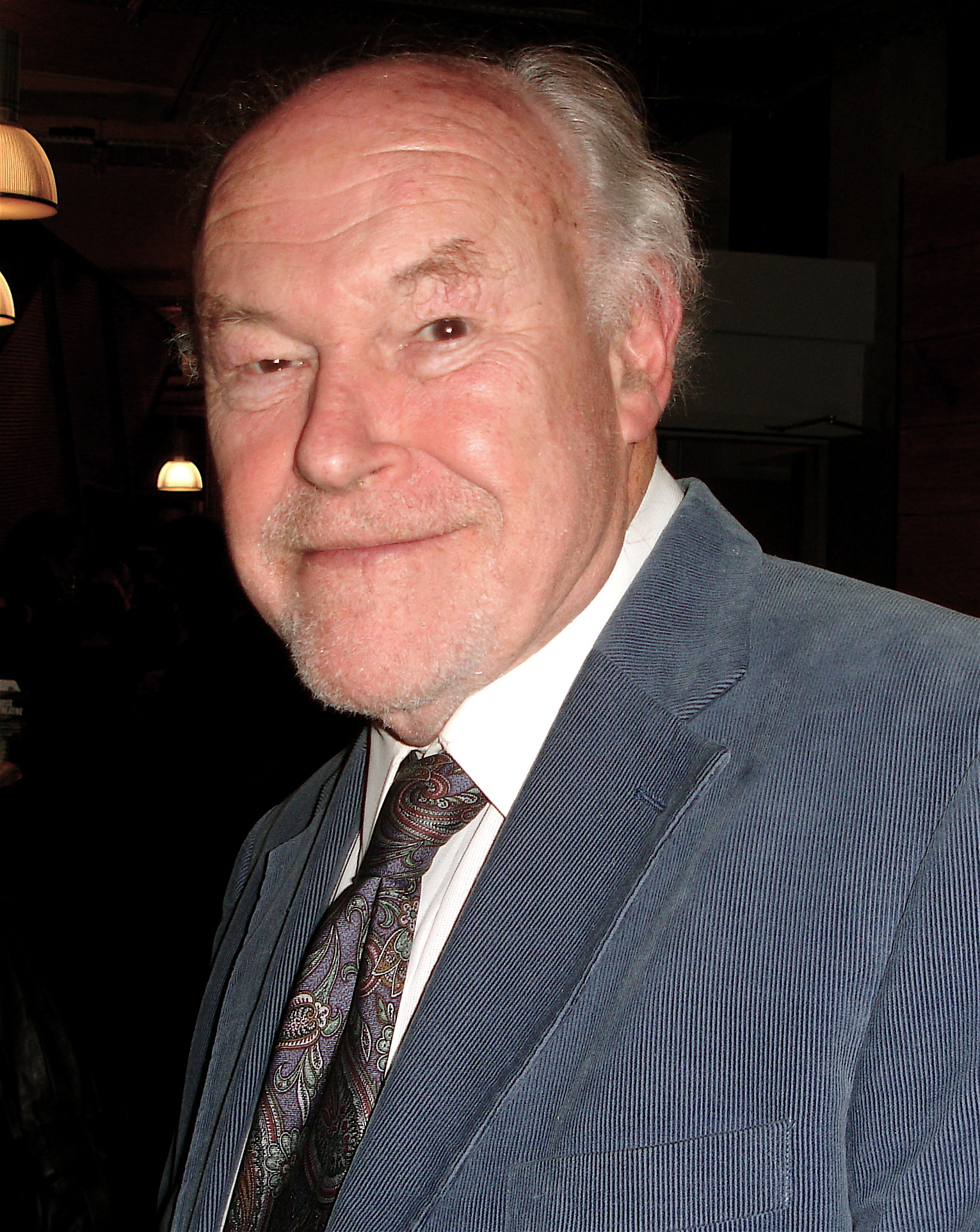
- West in 2010
- Born: Timothy Lancaster West; 20 October 1934; Bradford, West Riding of Yorkshire, England
- Died: 12 November 2024 (aged 90); Wandsworth, London, England
- Education: The John Lyon School; Bristol Grammar School
- Alma mater: Regent Street Polytechnic (now University of Westminster)
- Occupation: Actor
- Years active: 1956–2024
- Spouses: Jacqueline Boyer (m. 1956; div. 1961) Prunella Scales (m. 1963)
- Children: 3, including Samuel West
- Father: Lockwood West

Timothy Lancaster West (20 October 1934 – 12 November 2024) was an English actor with a long and varied career across theatre, film, and television. He began acting in repertory theatres in the 1950s before making his London stage debut in 1959 moving on to three seasons with the Royal Shakespeare Company during the 1960s. West played King Lear (four times) and Macbeth (twice) along with other notable roles in The Master Builder and Uncle Vanya. In 1978, West was nominated for the Laurence Olivier Award for Actor of the Year in a Revival for his performance in The Homecoming.

On screen, his breakout role was playing King Edward VII in the television series Edward the Seventh in 1975, earning him his first nomination for the BAFTA Award for Best Actor, with a second following in 1980. West appeared in major films such as Nicholas and Alexandra (1971), The Day of the Jackal (1973), and The Thirty Nine Steps (1978). His television highlights included Brass (1982–1990), Bedtime (2001–2003), and Churchill and the Generals for which he won a Royal Television Society award in 1980.

As a director, West led productions at the Forum Theatre in Melbourne, Australia and the Old Vic in London. He was also known for his collaborations with his second wife, actress Prunella Scales, in both acting and personal projects.

== Early life and education ==
Timothy Lancaster West was born on 20 October 1934 in Bradford, West Riding of Yorkshire, the only son of Olive (née Carleton-Crowe; 1902–1985) and actor Lockwood West (1905–1989). He had a sister Patricia who was five years younger than him. He was educated at the John Lyon School, Harrow on the Hill, at Bristol Grammar School, where he was a classmate of Julian Glover, and at Regent Street Polytechnic (now the University of Westminster).

== Career ==
West worked as an office furniture salesman and as a recording technician before becoming an assistant stage manager at the Wimbledon Theatre in 1956.

=== Stage ===
West played repertory seasons in Newquay, Hull, Northampton, Worthing and Salisbury before making his London debut at the Piccadilly Theatre in 1959 in the farce Caught Napping. He was a member of the Royal Shakespeare Company for three seasons: the 1962 Arts Theatre Experimental season (Nil Carborundum and Afore Night Come), the 1964 'Dirty Plays' season (Victor, the premiere production of Marat/Sade and the revival of Afore Night Come) and the 1965 season at Stratford and later at the Aldwych Theatre appearing in The Comedy of Errors, Timon of Athens, The Jew of Malta, Love's Labour's Lost and Peter Hall's production of The Government Inspector, in a company which included Paul Scofield, Eric Porter, Janet Suzman, Paul Rogers, Ian Richardson, Glenda Jackson and Peter McEnery.

West played Macbeth twice, Uncle Vanya twice, Solness in The Master Builder twice and King Lear four times: in 1971 (aged 36) for the Prospect Theatre Company at the Edinburgh Festival; on a worldwide tour in 1991 in Dublin for Second Age; in 2003 for the English Touring Theatre, on tour in the UK and at the Old Vic; and in 2016 at the Bristol Old Vic.

=== Screen ===
Having spent years as a familiar face who never quite became a household name, West's big break came with the major television series Edward the Seventh (1975), in which he played the title role from age 23 until the King's death; his real-life sons, Samuel and Joseph, played the sons of the King as children. His father, Lockwood West, also portrayed King Edward VII in 1972 in an episode of the LWT television drama series Upstairs, Downstairs. Other screen appearances included Nicholas and Alexandra (1971), The Day of the Jackal (1973), The Thirty Nine Steps (1978), Masada (1981), Cry Freedom (1987) and Luc Besson's The Messenger: The Story of Joan of Arc (1999). In Richard Eyre's Iris (2001) he played Maurice and his son Samuel West played Maurice as a young man.

West starred as patriarch Bradley Hardacre in Granada TV's satirical Northern super-soap Brass over three seasons (1982–1990). He appeared in the series Miss Marple in 1985 (in "A Pocket Full of Rye" as the notorious Rex Fortescue) and made an appearance as Professor Furie in A Very Peculiar Practice in 1986. In 1997, he played Gloucester in the BBC television production of King Lear, with Ian Holm as Lear. From 2001 to 2003, he played the grumpy and frequently volatile Andrew in the BBC drama series Bedtime.

In 1989, West played Nigel in the Thames Television sitcom After Henry alongside his real-life wife, Prunella Scales, who played Sarah France. They appeared together in the episode 'Upstagers', shown on 21 March 1989.

At Christmas 2007, he joined Not Going Out as Geoffrey Adams. He reprised the role in two episodes of series three; Geoffrey Whitehead played the role in later seasons. In 2011, he appeared alongside John Simm and Jim Broadbent in the BBC series Exile, written by BAFTA-winning Danny Brocklehurst.

In February 2013, West joined the cast of ITV soap Coronation Street, playing Eric Babbage. He joined the cast of EastEnders in 2013, playing Stan Carter from January 2014. He filmed his final scenes for EastEnders in February 2015.

In 2019, West played Private Godfrey in Dad's Army: The Lost Episodes, a recreation of three missing episodes of the BBC comedy Dad's Army.

His final acting role was in the penultimate episode of the BBC daytime series Doctors, which was screened the day after his death.

=== Directing ===
West was artistic director of the Forum Theatre, Billingham, in 1973, where he directed We Bombed in New Haven by Joseph Heller, The Oz Obscenity Trial by David Livingstone and The National Health by Peter Nichols. He was co-artistic director of the Prospect Theatre Company at the Old Vic from 1980 to 1981, where he directed Trelawny of the 'Wells' and The Merchant of Venice. He was director-in-residence at the University of Western Australia in 1982.

In 2004, West toured Australia with the Carl Rosa Opera Company as director of a production of H.M.S. Pinafore, also singing the role of Sir Joseph Porter.

== Personal life and death ==
From 1956 to 1961, West was married to actress Jacqueline Boyer, with whom he had a daughter, Juliet. In 1963 he married actress Prunella Scales (died 27 October 2025), with whom he had two sons, actor Samuel West and Joseph.

The Guardian crossword setter Biggles referred to West's 50th wedding anniversary in its prize crossword puzzle (number 26,089) on 26 October 2013, themed around Scales' role in Fawlty Towers.

West and Scales were patrons of the Lace Market Theatre in Nottingham, The Kings Theatre in Gloucester and of the Conway Hall Sunday Concerts programme in London, the longest-running series of chamber music concerts in Europe. West was an Ambassador of SOS Children's Villages, an international orphan charity providing homes and mothers for orphaned and abandoned children. He supported the charity's annual World Orphan Week.

West was patron of the National Piers Society, a charity dedicated to preserving and promoting seaside piers. He and Prunella Scales were patrons of Avon Navigation Trust (ANT), the charity that runs the River Avon from Stratford-upon-Avon to Tewkesbury. They both supported ANT by attending the Stratford River Festival every year. West supported Cancer Research UK.

West was a Patron of Kids for Kids, helping children living in remote villages of Darfur, Sudan through sustainable projects. He and his wife supported Kids for Kids for many years and he continued to be a Reader at the annual Candlelit Christmas Concert at St Peter’s Eaton Square where he always chose something he knew the children would love.

West was a supporter of the Talyllyn Railway in mid Wales, the first preserved railway in the world. He visited on a number of occasions, the last being the summer of 2015 to attend the railway's 150th anniversary. He was a patron of the Inland Waterways Association.

West was president of the London Academy of Music and Dramatic Art for 31 years (being succeeded by Benedict Cumberbatch in January 2018), and was president of the Society for Theatre Research. He was also patron of London-based drama school Associated Studios.

After a fall, West's health declined throughout his final months, and he died at a care home in Wandsworth on 12 November 2024, aged 90. His wife of 61 years, Prunella Scales, died almost a year later

== Honours ==
In 1984, West was appointed CBE for his services to drama. He was accepted as a fellow to the Royal Society of Arts in 1992.

During his life, West was awarded eight honorary doctorates: University of Bradford (1993), University of the West of England (1994), University of East Anglia (1996), University of Westminster (1999), University of London (2004), University of Hull (2004), Royal Conservatoire of Scotland (2004), and University of Kent (2018) He also received an honorary degree from the University of Bristol in 2017.

== Selected theatre appearances ==
- King Lear, as Lear, Dir Tom Morris, Bristol Old Vic, 2016
- The Vote by James Graham, Donmar Warehouse and More4, 2015
- The Handyman by Ronald Harwood, as Romka, Dir Joe Harmston, UK tour, 2012
- Uncle Vanya, as Sererbryakov, Dir Jeremy Herrin, Chichester Festival Theatre, 2012
- The Winslow Boy, as Arthur Winslow, Dir Stephen Unwin, Rose Theatre, Kingston and UK tour, 2009
- Romany Wood, as narrator, Theatre Severn, Shropshire, 2009
- The Lover/The Collection, Dir Jamie Lloyd, Comedy Theatre, London, 2008
- Opening of St Pancras International, as William Henry Barlow, Tuesday 6 November 2007
- Coriolanus as Menenius, Dir Gregory Doran, RSC, Stratford-upon-Avon, Newcastle, Spain and USA, 2007
- A Number by Caryl Churchill as Salter, with Samuel West as B1/B2/Michael Black, Dir Jonathan Munby, Crucible Theatre Studio, 2006. Revived in 2010 at the Chocolate Factory and 2011 at the Fugard Theatre, Cape Town.
- The Old Country by Alan Bennett, Dir Stephen Unwin, Trafalgar Studios, 2006
- King Lear, as Lear, Dir Stephen Unwin, UK tour with English Touring Theatre, 2002
- The Master Builder, as Solness, Dir Stephen Unwin, UK tour, 1999
- King Lear, as Gloucester, Dir Richard Eyre, Greece, Turkey and the National Theatre, 1997
- Henry IV Part One and Part Two, as Falstaff, with Samuel West as Hal, Dir Stephen Unwin, UK tour and the Old Vic Theatre, 1996
- Twelve Angry Men, Dir Harold Pinter, Bristol Old Vic and Comedy Theatre, 1996
- Macbeth, as Macbeth, Dir Helena Kaut-Howson, Theatr Clwyd, 1994
- Death of a Salesman, as Willy Loman, Dir Janet Suzman, Theatr Clwyd, 1993
- King Lear as Lear, Dir Alan Stanford, Tivoli Theatre, Dublin, 1992
- Long Day's Journey into Night, with Prunella Scales, Dir Howard Davies, Bristol Old Vic, UK Tour and the National Theatre, 1991
- It's Ralph as Andrew, by Hugh Whitemore, Dir Clifford Williams, Comedy Theatre London 1991
- Uncle Vanya, as Vanya, Dir Paul Unwin, Bristol Old Vic, 1990
- The Master Builder, as Solness, Dir Paul Unwin, Bristol Old Vic, 1989
- When We Are Married, with Prunella Scales, Dir Ronald Eyre, Whitehall Theatre, 1985
- Masterclass by David Pownall, as Stalin, Dir Justin Greene, Leicester Haymarket and the Old Vic Theatre, 1984
- Uncle Vanya, as Vanya, Dir Prunella Scales, Playhouse, Perth, Western Australia, 1982
- The Merchant of Venice as Shylock, International tour in association with the British Council and at the Old Vic Theatre, 1980
- Beecham, by Caryl Brahms and Ned Sherrin, as Thomas Beecham, Apollo Theatre, London, 1980
- The Homecoming, as Max, Garrick Theatre, Dir Kevin Billington, 1978.
- Hamlet, as Claudius, with Derek Jacobi as Hamlet, Dir Toby Robertson, Edinburgh Festival, International tour and the Old Vic Theatre, 1977
- Othello, as Iago, Dir Richard Eyre, Nottingham Playhouse, 1976
- Hedda Gabler, as Judge Brack, Dir Trevor Nunn, with Glenda Jackson, RSC, international tour and Aldwych Theatre, 1975
- Macbeth, as Macbeth, Gardner Arts Centre, Brighton, Dir John David, 1974
- Love's Labour's Lost, as Holofernes, Aldwych Theatre, London, McBain/Archer, Prospect Theatre Company, June 1972
- King Lear as Lear, Prospect Theatre Company, Dir Toby Robertson, Edinburgh Festival and UK tour, 1971. The production visited Australia in 1972
- Exiles, Dir Harold Pinter. Mermaid Theatre, 1970
- Richard II and Edward II, as Bolingbroke and Young Mortimer, with Ian McKellen as the kings, Prospect Theatre Company, Edinburgh Festival, International tour and Piccadilly Theatre, Dir Richard Cottrell/Toby Robertson, 1969
- The Tempest, as Prospero, Prospect Productions, Dir Toby Robertson, 1966
- "Madam", said Dr Johnson, Prospect Productions, Dir Toby Robertson, 1966
- Marat/Sade, RSC, Dir Peter Brook, 1964
- Afore Night Come, RSC, Arts Theatre, 1962. Revived at the Aldwych Theatre, 1964
- Gentle Jack, Theatre Royal, Brighton and the Queen's Theatre, London, 1963
- Caught Napping, Piccadilly Theatre, 1959

== Filmography ==
=== Film ===
Year	Title	Role	Notes
1966	The Deadly Affair	Matrevis	Uncredited
1968	Twisted Nerve	Superintendent Dakin	
1969	The Looking Glass War	Taylor	
1971	Nicholas and Alexandra	Dr. Botkin	
1973	Hitler: The Last Ten Days	Prof. Karl Gebhardt	
1973	The Day of the Jackal	Commissioner Berthier	
1974	Soft Beds, Hard Battles	Convent Chaplain	
1975	Hedda	Judge Brack	
1977	Joseph Andrews	Mr. Tow-Wouse	
1977	The Devil's Advocate	Father Anselmo	
1978	News From Nowhere	William Morris	
1978	The Thirty Nine Steps	Porton	
1979	Agatha	Kenward	
1980	Rough Cut	Nigel Lawton	
1987	Cry Freedom	Captain De Wet	
1988	Consuming Passions	Dr Rees	
1998	Ever After	King Francis	
1999	The Messenger: The Story of Joan of Arc	Cauchon	
2000	102 Dalmatians	Judge	
2001	The Fourth Angel	Jones	
2001	Iris	Older Maurice	
2002	Villa des Roses	Hugh Burrell	
2003	Sinbad: Legend of the Seven Seas	King Dymas	Voice
2003	Beyond Borders	Lawrence Bauford	
2009	Endgame	P.W. Botha	
2012	Run for Your Wife	Man in pub	Cameo
2016	Delirium	College Bursar	
2018	We the Kings	Victor	
2022	The Book of Water	Geiser	

=== Television ===
Year	Title	Role	Notes
1960	Persuasion	Charles Hayter	
1961	Deadline Midnight	Ambulance Man	1 episode
1969	Big Breadwinner Hog	Lennox	dir Mike Newell/Michael Apted
1970	Randall and Hopkirk (Deceased)	Sam Grimes	Series 1 Episode 24 "Vendetta for a Dead Man"
1972	The Edwardians	Horatio Bottomley	Episode "Horatio Bottomley"
1975	Edward the Seventh	King Edward VII	
1977	Hard Times	Josiah Bounderby	
1979	Crime and Punishment	Porfiry Petrovich	
1979	BBC Television Shakespeare	Cardinal Wolsey	Episode: Henry VIII
1979	Churchill and the Generals	Winston Churchill	
1980	Tales of the Unexpected	Albert Taylor	Episode: "Royal Jelly"
1981	Masada	Emperor Vespasian	
1982	Murder Is Easy	Gordon, Lord Easterfield	
1983–1990	Brass	Bradley Hardacre	Three series
1984	The Last Bastion	Winston Churchill	
1985	Miss Marple	Rex Fortescue	Episode: "A Pocket Full of Rye"
1986	A Very Peculiar Practice	Professor Furie	
1986	The Good Doctor Bodkin Adams	John Bodkin Adams	A drama based on the 1957 trial of the doctor
1986	The Monocled Mutineer	Brigadier General Thompson	
1987	When We Are Married	Councillor Albert Parker	
1987	What the Butler Saw	Dr Rance	
1988	The Contractor	Frank Ewbank	By David Storey
1989	Campion: Police at the Funeral	Uncle William Faraday	
1989	Blore, M.P.	Derek Blore	A drama loosely based on the Profumo affair
1990	Beecham	Sir Thomas Beecham	Adapted from the play about the conductor
1990	The Tragedy of Flight 103: The Inside Story	Colonel Wilfred Wood	
1992	Shakespeare: The Animated Tales	Prospero	Episode: The Tempest
1992	Framed	DCI Jimmy McKinnes	
1994	Smokescreen	Frank Sheringham	
1996	Over Here	Archie Bunting (elderly)	An elder version of main protagonist Archie Bunting, played by West's son, Samuel
1998	King Lear	Gloucester	
1998	Goodnight Sweetheart	MI5 agent Tufty MacDuff	2 episodes
1998	The Day the Guns Fell Silent	presenter	BBC TV documentary about the end of the Great War
2000	Midsomer Murders	Marcus Devere	Episode: "Judgement Day"
2000–2008	Water World	presenter	Eight series
2001	Murder in Mind	Dr William Collins	Episode: "Mercy"
2001–2003	Bedtime	Andrew Oldfield	Three series
2002	Martin Luther	Martin Luther	PBS Empires series
2004	Waking the Dead	Joe Doyle	Episode: "False Flag"
2005	New Tricks	Professor Ian Mears	Episode #2.8
2005	Bleak House	Sir Leicester Dedlock	12 episodes
2007–2009	Not Going Out	Geoffrey	Series 2 and 3
2010	Terry Pratchett's Going Postal	Mustrum Ridcully	2 episodes
2010	Agatha Christie's Poirot	Reverend Cottrell	Episode: "Hallowe'en Party"
2010	Lewis	Professor Donald Terry	Series 4, Episode 3: "Your Sudden Death Question"
2011	Exile	Don Metzler	2 episodes
2012	Titanic	Lord Pirrie	
2013	Coronation Street	Eric Babbage	7 episodes
2013, 2020	Last Tango in Halifax	Ted Buttershaw	4 episodes
2014	Inside No. 9	Andrew	Episode 1, "Sardines"
2014–2015	EastEnders	Stan Carter	104 episodes
2014–2019	Great Canal Journeys	Presenter	Channel 4 television series with wife, Prunella Scales
2015	Toast of London	Ormond Sacker	Episode: "Man of Sex"
2016	Comedy Playhouse	Milton	Episode: "Broken Biscuits"
2018	Shakespeare & Hathaway: Private Investigators	Johnnie Falstaff	Episode 2
2019–2022	Gentleman Jack	Jeremy Lister	Main cast
2019	Dad's Army: The Lost Episodes	Private Godfrey	Three episodes
2023	Sister Boniface Mysteries	Charles Usher	Episode: "The Star of the Orient"
2024	Doctors	Artie Simkins	Episode: "Go Out Dancing", final acting role, broadcast posthumously

== Selected radio ==
Timothy West was a member of the BBC Radio Drama Repertory Company in 1962 and took part in over 500 radio broadcasts. In 1959, he wrote and produced a short audio play, This Gun That I Have in My Right Hand Is Loaded, satirising typical mistakes of radio drama, including over-explanatory dialogue and misuse of sound cues.

- Cabin Pressure by John Finnemore, as Gordon Shappey, BBC Radio 4, 2011
- Seasons by Gareth Parker, as Harold. Independent drama by the Wireless Theatre Company, 2010
- Old Harry's Game by Andy Hamilton, as God, BBC Radio 4, 2009.
- The Man on the Heath: Johnson and Boswell Investigate by David Noakes, as Doctor Johnson, Saturday Play on BBC Radio 4, 2005
- Lorna Doone by R.D. Blackmore, as narrator, 2004
- Rumpole of the Bailey, as Rumpole, in sixteen 45-minute plays, 2003–2012. In this series his wife in real life played his fictional wife.
- Hecuba by Euripides, as Polymestor, 2001
- Groupie by Arnold Wesker, 2001
- Dorothy, a Manager's Wife by Peter Tinniswood, 2000
- Death of a Salesman by Arthur Miller, as Willy Loman, 1993
- The Gibson by Bruce Bedford, 1992
- The Expedition of Humphry Clinker by Tobias Smollett, Classic Serial on BBC Radio 4, 1992
- Crisp and Even Brightly by Alick Rowe, as 'Generally well-intentioned King Wenceslas', Saturday Night Theatre, BBC Radio 4, 1987
- I, Claudius and Claudius the God by Robert Graves, as Claudius, produced by Glyn Dearman, 1985
- With a Whimper to the Grave by Wally K. Daly, as 642, 1984
- Actors, or Playing for Real by Lope de Vega, as Emperor Diocletian, BBC Radio 3, 1983
- Dear Countess by Elizabeth Morgan 1983
- Lady Windermere's Fan by Oscar Wilde, Saturday Night Theatre, BBC Radio 4, 1982
- Operation Lightning Pegasus by Alick Rowe, as Agammemnon, Saturday Night Theatre, BBC Radio 4, 1981
- Sherlock Holmes v. Dracula by Loren D. Estleman, as Doctor Watson, dramatised and directed by Glyn Dearman, Saturday Night Theatre, BBC Radio 4, 1981
- The Monument by David Cregan, as Dr. James Short, BBC Radio 3, 1978
- Where Are They Now? by Tom Stoppard, as an Old Boy, 1971
- If You're Glad, I'll be Frank by Tom Stoppard, as Frank, 1966
- Macbeth, as the Porter, BBC Third Programme, 1966. Repeated on BBC Radio 4 in 1967 and BBC 7 in 2007

== Audiobooks ==
Timothy West recorded many unabridged audiobooks, including the complete Barchester Chronicles and the complete Palliser novels by Anthony Trollope, and seven of George MacDonald Fraser's The Flashman Papers books. He received four AudioFile Earphones Awards for his narration.

== Books ==
- I'm Here I Think, Where Are You? Letters from a Touring Actor, 1994, ISBN 978-1-85459-222-4.
- A Moment Towards the End of the Play (autobiography), 2001, ISBN 978-1-85459-619-2.
- So You Want to Be an Actor (with Prunella Scales), 2005, ISBN 978-1-85459-879-0.
- Great Canal Journeys: A Lifetime of Memories on Britain's Most Beautiful Waterways, 2017, ISBN 978-1-78606-511-7.
- Pru and Me: The Amazing Marriage of Prunella Scales and Timothy West, 2023, ISBN 978-0241629550.
