= Iain Mackintosh =

British theatre producer

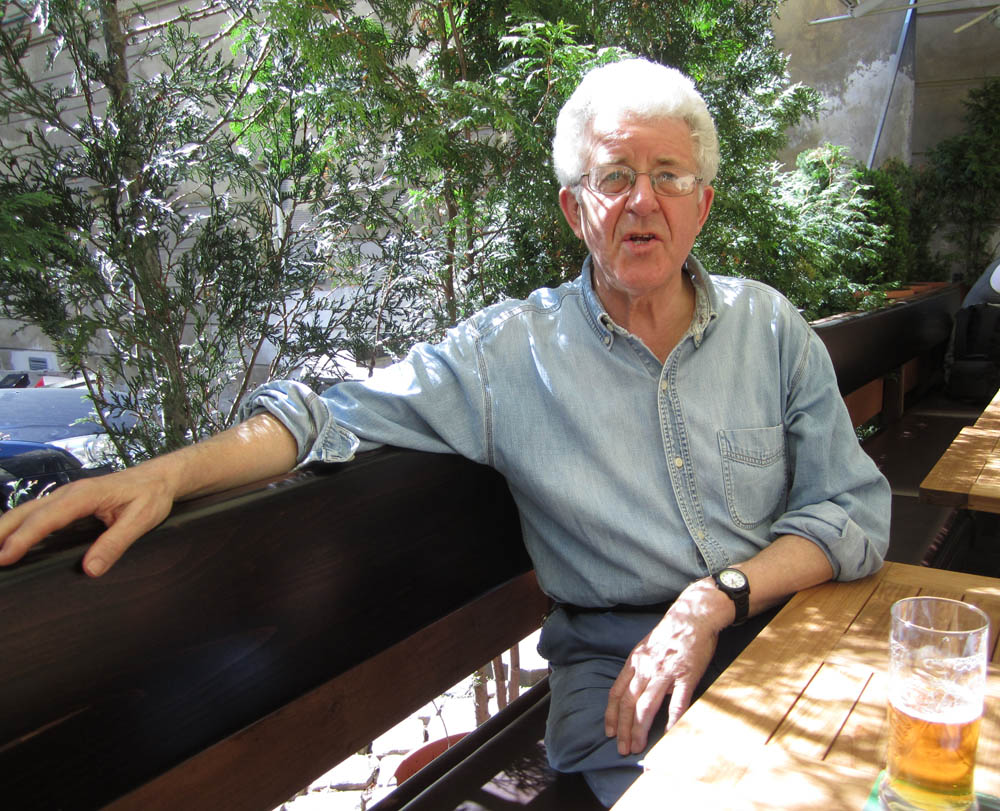
Ian Mackintosh, Prague, 2011

Iain Mackintosh (born 1937) is a British practitioner of theatre combining four interwoven careers as theatre producer, theatre space designer, curator of theatre painting and architecture exhibitions, and author and lecturer on both modern and eighteenth century theatre. He has campaigned for the retention and restoration of historic theatres as working homes for live performance. From 1975 he curated or contributed to several exhibitions of theatre paintings and architecture.

== Early life ==
Iain Mackintosh was born in Bristol, England, in 1937, and brought up in Bristol, Cornwall and Edinburgh, Scotland. Two years National Service in Hong Kong as a subaltern in the Royal Artillery, was followed by three years at Worcester College, Oxford where he took the Worcester College Buskins to the Kenton Theatre, Henley on Thames during the regatta with a review entitled "One Over The Eight". He graduated in 1960 and immediately became resident stage manager (technical director) at the Oxford Playhouse. In 1961 he co-founded the Prospect Theatre Company with Elizabeth Sweeting, manager of the Playhouse.

Mackintosh joined Theatre Projects Consultants in 1973 as a designer of theatre space and in collaboration with many architects in the UK, USA, and Canada, and with colleagues at Theatre Projects designed many significant new and restored theatre spaces.

== Theatre producer, 1961–1973 ==
In 1962 Sweeting and Mackintosh were joined on the board of Prospect by Richard Cottrell, who was associate director from 1964 to 1969, and by Toby Robertson, who became artistic director in 1964, following his production of The Provoked Wife with Eileen Atkins. Prospect was in Cambridge from 1964 and in London from 1966. Between 1963 and 1976 Prospect toured 75 productions in 125 theatres in 21 countries. In 1973 Mackintosh resigned as administrative director but remained on the Prospect board. In these first twelve years eight productions were presented at the Edinburgh International Festival, including the Lila Kedrova Cherry Orchard (1967) and Ian McKellen's double presentation of Edward II and Richard II (1968–70). These and many other Prospect productions, such as Timothy West's King Lear (1972/73), transferred to successful seasons in London West End theatres. Three productions were televised.

In 1961 Mackintosh designed settings and costumes for two special productions at the Oxford Playhouse: the Oxford University Opera production of Benjamin Britten's The Turn of the Screw (only the second production anywhere of this opera), and Prospect's first production, the premiere of Whiteman by Michael Picardie with Brian Blessed and Prunella Scales (refer Note 1). This stage design experience was to feed back into his later career. Thereafter Mackintosh concentrated on his role as producer for Prospect. He secured international festival engagements for Prospect in Vienna, Austria; Venice, Italy and Adelaide, Australia, as well as arranging many tours Prospect overseas tours with the British Council. Touring Prospect productions and seeing the same show succeed in some theatres and fail in others led Mackintosh to concentrate on the influence of theatre architecture on performance.

== Theatre space designer ==
After working as theatre design consultant to architect Graham Law on the Eden Court Theatre, Inverness, Mackintosh started his second career in 1973 as a designer of theatre space, joining Richard Pilbrow at Theatre Projects Consultants. He retired from Theatre Projects in 2006.

His first project at Theatre Projects was the Cottesloe Theatre at the National Theatre, London. The National Theatre building on London's Thames Southbank, designed by architect Sir Denys Lasdun, was then under construction as the new home for the National (which had been founded at the Old Vic in 1964). The Cottesloe was the third and smallest theatre, holding up to 400 people. It was located in an abandoned space under the rear of the Olivier Theatre stage. In 1973 this was a cavernous empty shell served by a partially complete foyer designed for only 200.

While the National's Olivier and Lyttleton Theatres are fixed-format, the Cottesloe can be recast into many arrangements to suit the production design. The simple design of the Cottesloe, with two galleries of audience seating surrounding three sides of the room, was ground-breaking. In 2013, on the 50th anniversary of the National, Director Nicholas Hytner wrote: ‘What Iain Mackintosh did when he was asked to make a theatre inside that big black empty box had a touch of improvisatory genius.’

In November 1973, when presenting the design concept to the National's Director, Peter Hall and John Bury, head of design, Mackintosh coined the phrase ‘courtyard theatre’. He later wrote ‘Courtyard, Cockpit or whatever … [it] should be particularly useful for experiment in non-scenic theatre … outdoor Fortune or indoor Blackfriars … or for the more formal expression of Grotowski or anyone else who has explored the notion of a ritual gathering of onlookers … The finish should be simple and workmanlike – it is designed to be unfinished in the sense that actor, designer and designer must ‘fill’ the whole space, and the audience complete the furnishings as wallpaper does a room’.

The Cottesloe was received enthusiastically by the theatre industry and audiences. As explained by The Theatres Trust Theatres Database entry for the Royal National Theatre: ‘It owes more in terms of inspiration to Mackintosh and Theatre Projects Consultants than to Lasdun. It was, in point of time, the second, but certainly the most influential of the modern ‘courtyard’ theatres, with something of the character of an urban barn fit-up. Its extremely simple, rectangular form, with the audience on three shallow tiers, can be readily adapted to proscenium, end stage, thrust, in-the-round, traverse or promenade form.’ In his review of Setting the Scene: Perspectives on Twentieth-Century Theatre Architecture, edited by Alistair Fair, Richard Pilbrow noted ‘It's interesting to reflect that in our National Theatre the two architect-designed theatres have attracted not one single imitator, whereas the theatre-designed Cottesloe has prompted perhaps more than fifty successful clones around the world. Bringing human beings together in lively juxtaposition simply works.'

This project led to other rectangular galleried playhouses, such as The Tricycle (1980) with architect Tim Foster, which was constructed out of builders’ scaffolding within an existing volume. The Founders’ Theatre (2001) at Lenox Massachusetts, developed with architect George Marsh of Boston, is likewise a scaffolded courtyard in an extended hut. Mackintosh's smallest galleried space is also his only theatre-in-the-round, the 185 seat Orange Tree Theatre in Richmond, London (1991).

Mackintosh developed two other forms of flexible theatre spaces, each holding around 450 patrons with three levels of seats around the edges enveloping the central audience area, which can be reconfigured for different stagings. Examples of the square form include Wilde Theatre, South Hill Park, Bracknell (1984), with architects Levitt Bernstein, and the Lawrence Batley Theatre, Huddersfield (1994) with the Kirklees local authority architects. The Guardian opera critic Andrew Clements wrote ‘The design is the work of Iain Mackintosh… and he has done a seamless job in creating a 400 plus theatre, beautifully proportioned with a handy adjustable pit.’

The first apsidal room (parallel sides with semi-circular galleries facing the stage) was the Martha Cohen Theatre, Calgary (1985), with architect Joel Barrett, later repeated in the Quays Theatre (2000) at The Lowry, Salford, with architect Michael Wilford. More architecturally refined examples were the Westminster School Theatre, Connecticut (1989), with architect Graham Gund, and the Vanburgh Theatre (2000) at the Royal Academy of Dramatic Art, in London, in collaboration with architect Bryan Avery.

Replacement of failed modern auditoria by returning to a traditional multilevel intimate house include the Bluma Appell Theatre at the St. Laurence Centre for the Arts, Toronto, Canada (1983) and the Enschede Schouwburg Netherlands with Dutch architect, Onno Greiner (1988).

The epitome of Mackintosh's horseshoe, galleried auditorium concepts was the Glyndebourne Opera (1994). It was undertaken for Theatre Projects Consultants in a team led by architect Michael Hopkins. Executive chairman Sir George Christie said ‘It was Mackintosh who convinced everybody that the horseshoe was the best shape. It happened remarkably quickly. We all felt intimacy would be most easily achieved with the people in the audience wrapped round like wallpaper. That's something that neither the fan shape nor the shoebox does.’ Architectural critic Jonathan Glancy wrote ‘Inside the auditorium the project makes near perfect sense. Mackintosh and Hopkins have produced a big but intimate space. It has as near as one can get to a timeless quality’.

Glyndebourne was the first of the new horseshoe opera houses such as Toronto, Dallas and Copenhagen (designed by others). Before Glyndebourne, ‘modern’ opera houses had all the seats pointing cinema-like at the stage. This format is good for audience sightlines but does not support a rich theatrical experience. Mackintosh's theatre forms were based on strict geometry, generally ad quadratum (ascending concentric circles within successive squares). In 2004 he contributed to the design for the second space at The Sage Gateshead, with architects Foster and Partners. Hall Two holds 450 patrons for all types of musical performance, with three encircling galleries and options of performing in the centre or on a platform stage along three of the ten sides. Mackintosh believed it to be the only performance space in the world with pentagonal geometry.

In 2009 Mackintosh worked with architect Robin Snell (also a contributor to Glyndebourne), on the design of the Opera Pavilion at Garsington Opera, which opened in 2011 and won many awards.

== New Life for Historic theatres ==
As well as working on new theatres Mackintosh has advocated for the retention and renovation of old theatres. These include the Festival Theatre, Edinburgh (1994), formerly the Milburn Brothers’ Empire Theatre of 1928 which he designed with architect Colin Ross of Law and Dunbar-Nasmith, the Theatre Royal, Nottingham (1976-1978) with Renton Howard Wood Levin Architects and the Lyceum Theatre, London.

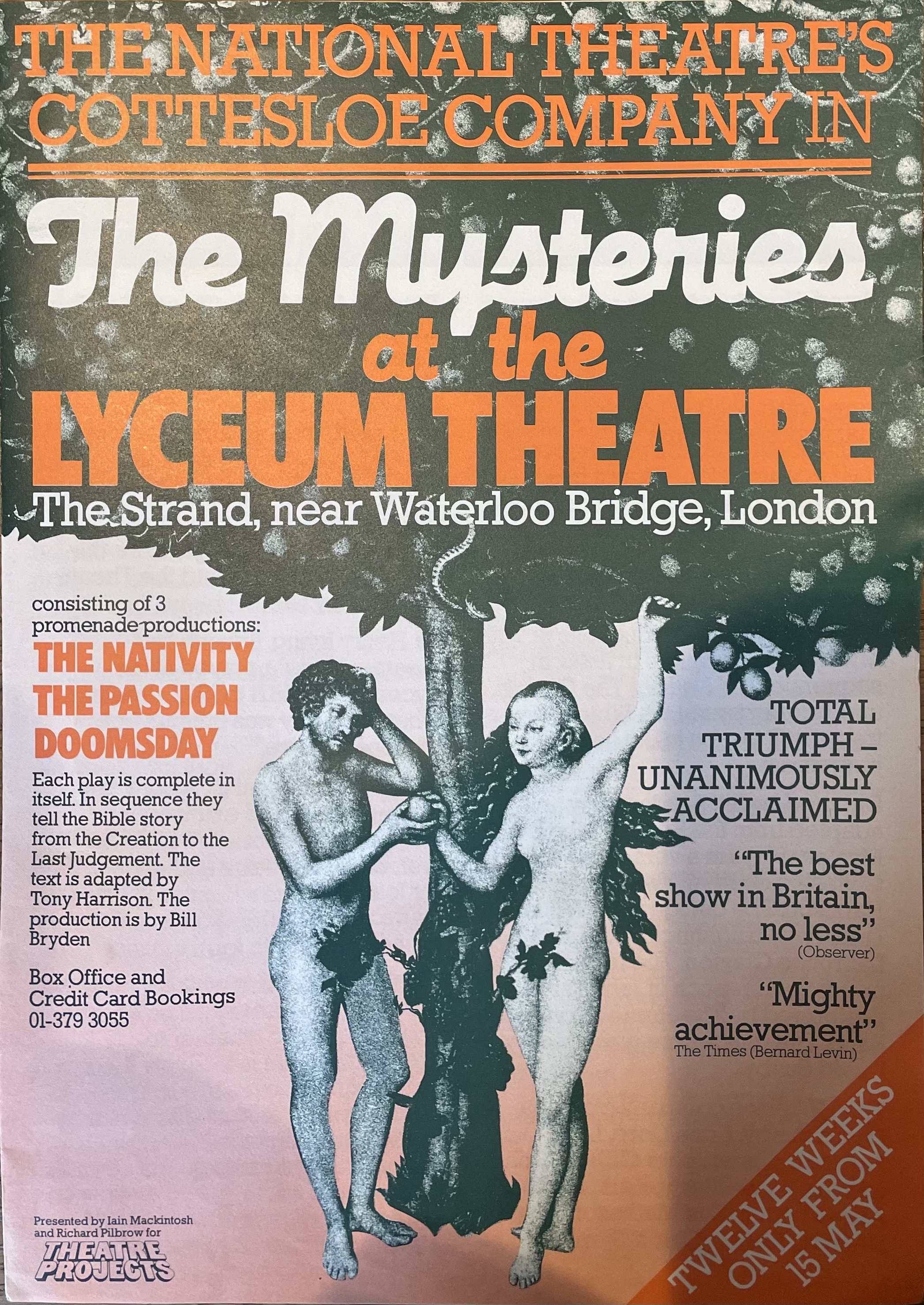
Flyer for The Mysteries at the Lyceum, May 1985

In 1982 the Curtains!!! Committee, formed by Mackintosh in 1976, published the first gazetteer of all British theatres, existing and demolished, built before 1914. The publication of ‘CURTAINS!!!' has been described as a turning point in the appreciation of historic theatres.

Iain served on the Board of Trustees of the Theatres Trust between 1984 and 1991

As a producer, Mackintosh in 1982 hired the Lyceum Theatre in London on behalf of Theatre Projects Associates to transfer the National Theatre Cottesloe production of The Mysteries, adapted by Bill Bryden. The Lyceum had not been used as a theatre since 1939 and had been partially converted into a ballroom in 1951. In 1982 it was under threat of demolition but to put on the Mysteries they built a courtyard space within the old dilapidated hulk of the theatre.

The Georgian Theatre Royal, Richmond, Yorkshire (1788), was fully restored in 2003 with Mackintosh and David Wilmore of Theatresearch as historical theatre consultants working with Allen Tod Architecture. The Prospect Company had opened the first show in the Theatre Royal Richmond for over a century on its re-opening in 1963. Mackintosh later initiated a conference in celebration of the Society for Theatre Research's sixtieth anniversary, held at the Georgian Theatre in 2008.

In 2003, on behalf of the Scottish Arts Council, Mackintosh and Sir James Dunbar-Nasmith (with whom he had worked on the Festival Theatre Edinburgh), supervised the reconstruction of the complete auditorium of the Opera House at Dunfermline, Scotland, within a new building in Sarasota, Florida. Built in 1921 by architects Swanston and Davison, it had been dismantled in the 1980s to make way for a shopping mall and after more than a decade in storage was taken to Florida to be meticulously re-assembled as a working professional playhouse, now the Mertz Theatre at the Asolo Repertory Theatre.

== Exhibitions of theatre painting and architecture ==
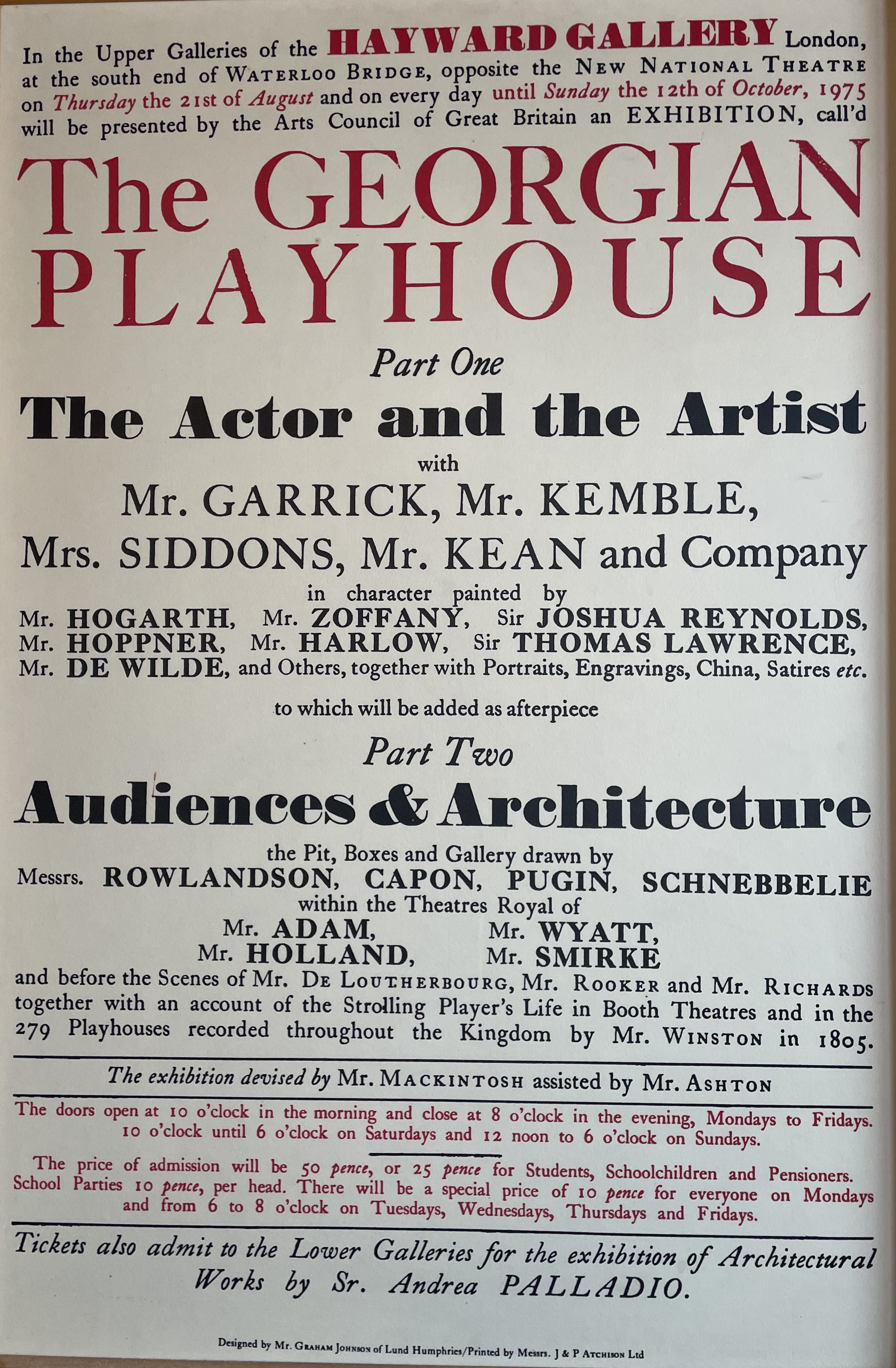
Poster for the Georgian Playhouse Exhibition, October 1975

Alongside designing theatre spaces, Mackintosh developed an interest in the history of theatre paintings and architecture and curated several exhibitions, each documented in comprehensive catalogues.

In 1975, he was commissioned by the Arts Council of Great Britain to curate and design ‘The Georgian Playhouse 1730–1830’ at their Hayward Gallery, in the run up to the National Theatre's opening. The exhibition comprised 379 oil paintings, watercolours and architectural designs and attracted acclaim from both theatre and art critics.

The Downfall of Shakespeare Represented on a Modern Stage, 1763-1765, William Dawes Theatre & Performance Collection, © Victoria and Albert Museum, London

At the 1981 Buxton Festival Mackintosh and Ashton curated ‘30 Different Likenesses of David Garrick – by 30 Different Artists’, ranging from Hogarth to Gainsborough, and in 1982 they collaborated on ‘The Royal Opera House Retrospective 1732 -1982’ at the Royal Academy, in celebration of the 250th anniversary of the Theatre Royal, Covent Garden.

For the 1987 Brighton Festival Mackintosh curated ‘“An Extravagant and Irrational Entertainment”: Staging the Opera in England 1632 to 1792’. In 2009 at the Orleans House Gallery, Twickenham, Marcus Risdell and Mackintosh co-curated ‘The Face and Figure of Shakespeare: How Britain's 18th Century Sculptors invented a National Hero’.

In 1995 the British Council commissioned Mackintosh to curate ‘Making Space for Theatre: 40 Years of British Theatre Architecture’, which opened at the National Theatre in London, then at the Prague Quadrennial of Scenography and Theatre Architecture.

In 2006 the Victoria & Albert Museum London acquired Downfall of Shakespeare Represented on a Modern Stage (sic) by William Dawes, 1763-1765, and asked Mackintosh to research it. Mackintosh published his findings in an article in Theatre Notebook, Volume 62 Number 1, 2008, pp 20 – 58 plus seven plates.

For the 2011 Prague Quadrennial of Scenography and Theatre Architecture Mackintosh instigated the British exhibition entry, The Guthrie Thrust Stage: A Living Legacy, 1948-2011, and wrote its catalogue, published by the Association of British Theatre Technicians (ABTT).

== Author and lecturer ==
Mackintosh's 1993 book on theatre design, 'Actor, Audience and Architecture', describes the influence of architecture on the theatrical experience and critiques mid-twentieth-century theatre design. It has been influential with theatre space designers and architects and was described by Michael Coveney in The Observer as ‘Environmental theatre history at its best: analytical, informed, involved’. His other books include ‘Pit, Box and Gallery: A history of the Theatre Royal Bury St Edmunds’, The National Trust, 1979 and in 2023 "Theatre Spaces 1920-2020 Finding the Fun in Functionalism"

Contributions to journals, catalogues and chapters in books or catalogues edited by others include:

- ‘David Garrick and Benjamin Wilson’, Apollo, May, 1985: identifying and dating the prime version of Garrick as Romeo as 1752-53, the engraving as 1753 and establishing Benjamin Wilson as the first artist to depict Garrick on the Georgian stage and the equal of his more famous successor Zoffany.
- ‘King Kong versus Godzilla: The Competition for the Royal Opera House at The Hague 1910’ in Frank Matcham & Co, edited by David Wilmore, Theatreshire Books, Dacre Yorkshire, 2008: recounting the story of Britain's greatest 19th century theatre architect, Frank Matcham, competing with mainland Europe's most prolific theatre architects, Fellner & Helmer of Vienna, which the latter won but never saw built.
- ‘Departing Glories of the British Theatre: Setting Suns over a Neo-classical Landscape' in the catalogue London – World City 1800-1840, curated in Essen Germany by Celina Fox, Yale University Press, 1992.
- Entry on the Theatro Jose de Alcazar, Fortaleza, an ironwork theatre forged in Glasgow and shipped to Brazil in 1910, in Teatros, Uma Memoria dop Espacos Cenica no Brasil, ed J C Serroni, Senac, São Paulo, 2002
- Entry on Frank Matcham in The Dictionary of National Biography.
- Five illustrated papers given at the annual World of Baroque Theatre conferences held at Český Krumlov from 2002 to 2009 and published by the Baroque Theatre Foundation at Český Krumlov, 2003 et seq.
- ‘Fifty years of Theatre-making: Anecdotes and Apercus’, a revised and expanded version of the keynote address given at the Annual Symposium at Cambridge of the Architectural Historians of Great Britain, April 2012 and now reproduced in ‘Setting the Scene, Perspectives on Twentieth-Century Theatre Architecture’ edited by Alistair Fair, Ashgate, 2015 ISBN 9781472416520.

International Symposium on Baroque Theatre Czech Republic 1994 Cesky Krumlov /2002 Cesky Krumlov / 2004 Cesky Krumlov / Cesky Krumlov 2009

== Awards ==
In 1995 Mackintosh was the first Briton to sit on the International Jury at the Prague Quadrennial of Scenography and Theatre Architecture and in 1999 collected their Special Gold Medal for Architecture on behalf of the new Glyndebourne Opera House. In 2003 he was awarded the annual Cascieri Medal and Lectureship in the Humanities by the Boston Architectural Center. He was a jury member in 2011 for the Prague OISTAT Theatre Architecture Competition (International Organisation of Scenographers, Theatre Architects, and Technicians). Theatres with which Mackintosh has been associated have won more than 20 Architecture Awards in Britain and overseas.

== Notes and references ==
Notes
