= Georges Douking =

French actor

- Born: Georges Ladoubée; 6 August 1902; Paris, France
- Died: 20 October 1987 (aged 85); Draveil, France
- Other names: Douking
- Occupation(s): Actor, director
- Years active: 1934–1981
- Spouse: Janie Gayme

Georges Douking (born Georges Ladoubée; 6 August 1902 – 20 October 1987) was a French stage, film, and television actor. He also directed stage plays such as the premier presentation of Jean Giraudoux's Sodom and Gomorrah at the Théâtre Hébertot in 1943. He is perhaps best known for his role in the surreal 1972 comedy The Discreet Charm of the Bourgeoisie. He was one of the favorite actors of the French filmmaker Pierre Chenal.

Douking appeared in more than 75 films between 1934 and 1981.

== Partial filmography ==
- 1934: Street Without a Name
- 1935: Crime and Punishment (directed by Pierre Chenal) - Nicolas
- 1935: The Green Domino
- 1936: Razumov: Sous les yeux d'occident - (uncredited)
- 1937: The Man from Nowhere - Le domestique simplet de la pension
- 1938: The Woman from the End of the World - Planque
- 1938: The Lafarge Case - Parent
- 1938: Les gaietés de l'exposition - Le deuxième détective
- 1938: The Train for Venice - Le barman
- 1938: Education of a Prince - Pausanias
- 1938: Katia - L'espion
- 1938: J'accuse! (directed by Abel Gance)
- 1939: Deputy Eusèbe - Firmin
- 1939: The Mayor's Dilemma - Brazoux
- 1939: Louise - Un peintre (uncredited)
- 1939: Le Dernier Tournant - Un joueur
- 1939: Yamilé sous les cèdres - Ahmed
- 1939: Deuxième bureau contre kommandantur
- 1939: Le Jour Se Lève (directed by Marcel Carné) - L'aveugle (uncredited)
- 1939: La Charrette fantôme - Un ivrogne (uncredited)
- 1943: La Main du diable - Le tire-laine (uncredited)
- 1943: Tornavara - Gregor
- 1943: Finance noire
- 1943: Un seul amour - Le père Biondi
- 1943: Adrien - Le peintre
- 1948: Clochemerle - Le préparateur
- 1949: Maya - Un soutier
- 1950: Lady Paname - Le parlementaire - un ami de Fred
- 1951: Savage Triangle - Le paysan
- 1952: Judgement of God (directed by Raymond Bernard) - Le moine Enrique - commissaire de l'inquisition
- 1956: The Hunchback of Notre Dame (directed by Jean Delannoy) - A Thief
- 1957: An Eye for an Eye - Le guérisseur
- 1958: Rafles sur la ville - Le fou
- 1958: La Bonne Tisane - Bob
- 1959: Ce corps tant désiré - Le commissaire
- 1959: La bête à l'affût - Le gardien du phare
- 1959: Le Bossu (directed by André Hunebelle) - Le marquis de Caylus
- 1960: Jack of Spades - Le vieux Manuel
- 1961: Five Day Lover
- 1964: Joy House (directed by René Clément) - Clochard
- 1964: Tintin and the Blue Oranges - Le photographe à Moulinsart (uncredited)
- 1965: What's New Pussycat? (directed by Clive Donner) - Concierge at Renee's Apartment (uncredited)
- 1966: The Poppy Is Also a Flower - Financier of Marko (uncredited)
- 1966: Mademoiselle (directed by Tony Richardson) - The Priest
- 1966: Triple Cross - Polish Interrogator
- 1968: The Charge of the Light Brigade (directed by Tony Richardson) - Marshall St. Arnaud
- 1968: Spirits of the Dead (directed by Federico Fellini, Louis Malle, and Roger Vadim) - Le licier (segment "Metzengerstein")
- 1969: The Milky Way (directed by Luis Buñuel) - Le berger avec la chèvre
- 1969: Dandy (directed by Sergio Gobbi) - Un gêolier
- 1969: The Christmas Tree - L'animalier
- 1969: The Potatoes (directed by Claude Autant-Lara) - Voisin de P'tit Louis
- 1970: Sortie de secours
- 1971: The Great Mafia... (directed by Philippe Clair)
- 1972: Le droit d'aimer - Prisoner
- 1972: The Discreet Charm of the Bourgeoisie (directed by Luis Buñuel) - Gardener
- 1974: The Four Charlots Musketeers (directed by André Hunebelle)
- 1974: The Bidasses to Go to War (directed by Claude Zidi) - Le papé
- 1976: Les conquistadores - Le vieux
