= All Angels =

British classical group (2006–2011)

- Origin: London, England
- Genres: Classical crossover; operatic pop
- Years active: 2006–2011
- Past members: Melanie Nakhla; Charlotte Ritchie; Daisy Chute; Rachel Fabri; Laura Wright

All Angels were a British classical crossover group formed in 2006, consisting of Daisy Chute, Laura Wright, Rachel Fabri, Melanie Nakhla and actress Charlotte Ritchie.

The group's style was classical crossover music and close harmony arrangement, with a repertoire spanning classical, choral, opera and pop including Franz Schubert's Ellens dritter Gesang, Agnus Dei (the choral arrangement of Samuel Barber's Adagio for Strings) and the Sancta Maria intermezzo from Pietro Mascagni's Cavalleria rusticana, along with the Flower Duet from Léo Delibes' Lakmé and the Barcarolle from Jacques Offenbach's The Tales of Hoffmann, plus pop songs such as Robbie Williams' "Angels", Fleetwood Mac's "Songbird", Coldplay's "The Scientist", "True Colors", "Goodnight my Angel" (Billy Joel), Muse's "Starlight" and Prince's "Nothing Compares 2 U". They have also performed the UK national anthem at Twickenham Stadium and at the England vs. USA friendly football match in Wembley Stadium in May 2008.

They recorded their first three albums with Universal and have sold over 1 million albums to date. Their self-titled debut album, All Angels, was released in 2006, and their second album, Into Paradise, was released on 26 November 2007. A third album, Fly Away, was released in January 2010. Songs on this album include Norah Jones's "Come Away with Me", "Send In the Clowns", Bob Dylan's "Blowin' in the Wind", and a duet with the Harlem Gospel Choir on "I'll Fly Away".

== History ==
All Angels signed a five-album deal with Universal Classics and Jazz in 2006 to be targeted at the populist classical crossover market. Each of the group's members had to go through an audition process to join the group, and were selected from 120 auditionees. Their first live performance was at Cadogan Hall in Chelsea, London.

The group released their self-titled debut album All Angels on 13 November 2006, entering the UK charts at number nine. It was the UK's fastest selling debut for a classical act and won them a platinum disc, and was also nominated in the Classical BRIT Awards album of the year category in 2007. They sang in front of the Queen at the Festival of Remembrance held at the Royal Albert Hall on 9 November and at Silence in the Square, a concert held in Trafalgar Square on 11 November. In December 2006 they released the single "Angels", the first ever Christmas single to be released in association with the Royal British Legion and their Poppy Appeal.

In 2007, they sang at the Classical BRIT Awards ceremony held on 3 May and broadcast on ITV on 6 May. They made a cameo appearance in the British soap opera Emmerdale during a wedding on 9 October 2007 singing "Songbird", and performed the same Summer at the Emmerdale Grampian Fare in Aberdeen for the Anthony Nolan Trust. They again sang at the Festival of Remembrance on 10 November. On 26 November they released a second album, Into Paradise, which features "Nothing Compares 2 U" and "Sancte Deus". At the same time the album was released, the winner was announced of the national Angel Idol competition, run in conjunction with Classic FM to find a fifth member for the group. The winner was Alexandra Lawrie who then had the opportunity to record a track and perform with the girls at a concert in London on 28 November.

They appeared on the BBC Radio 4 2007 Christmas Service, held at Wesley's Chapel in London and on the BBC 2007 New Year's Eve show, singing "Nothing Compares 2 U".

On 14 January 2008, All Angels sang "The Sound of Silence" and "Pie Jesu" in a one-off concert at the International Eisteddfod's launch in Cardiff. On 27 January they appeared on Songs of Praise on BBC One. In 2008, they embarked on a Cathedral tour in the Spring and further touring at open-air concerts venues, including Sandringham and Gawsworth Hall. They also performed for the Make a Wish Foundation Summer Ball at Blenheim Palace. On 11 July, they appeared at the International Eisteddfod in Llangollen.

They went into the recording studio at the end of 2008 and into early 2009 recording tracks for their third album, Fly Away, which was released in 2009.

On 13 October 2009, All Angels performed a concert at Paisley Abbey with the Glasgow-based Les Sirènes Female Chamber Choir as part of the Paisley Choral Festival. The two groups collaborated on the song "I'll Fly Away" as a joint finale. They also performed their own concert at The Thaxted Festival. On 10 December 2009, they participated in the Birmingham Young Voices concert, singing with VV Brown.

All Angels returned for a second year to participate in the Young Voices Tour 2010, which kicked off in Birmingham. In November 2010, All Angels released an EP, titled "Starlight".

In Spring 2011, they performed for the 90th Anniversary for the Royal British Legion in Alicante, Spain. All Angels were also asked to record the theme to the 2011 UEFA Champions League Final and to perform it at the match at Wembley Stadium between Barcelona and Manchester United.

== Members ==
=== Daisy Chute ===
Daisy Chute (born c. 1989/1990) is from Edinburgh. She studied at St Mary's Music School Edinburgh, where she was a chorister at St. Mary's Episcopal Cathedral and Loretto School and began her performing career at the age of nine as the young Cosette in the touring production of Les Misérables. At the age of thirteen she appeared as a young Judy Garland in Stars in Their Eyes Kids, and made her first appearance on the Edinburgh Fringe.

At fifteen she recorded her debut album, Simply Jazz after she performed with a trio at a jazz cabaret show at the Edinburgh Jazz and Blues Festival and Edinburgh Fringe. A track from her Simply Jazz album was played by Humphrey Lyttelton on his BBC Radio 2 Best of Jazz show, making Chute the youngest performer to ever be showcased on his show.

Chute finished her secondary schooling at Purcell School in Bushey on a full scholarship, where she studied voice, piano and composition and gained three A's at A level examinations. She then went on to study music at King's College London, graduating in 2011.

In 2005 she was a joint winner of a Scottish songwriting competition for the music festival Burnsong, with her song, "Promises to Keep". All the winning songs were performed professionally and broadcast live on BBC Radio Scotland.

After meeting composer Howard Goodall at the Royal Albert Hall's School Proms where she was fronting Loretto School ensemble, she was asked to sing on his television show, How Music Works where she performed the Shaker song "'Tis a Gift to Be Simple" with Anastacia Nosobin on guitar on the first programme of the series. Goodall recommended Chute for inclusion in the group.

In June 2006 she was a "Highly Commended" finalist in the joint BBC Proms and The Guardian newspaper Young Composer Competition.

On 24 September 2006 she performed at Wigmore Hall in London, giving a solo recital of Alec Wilder songs. She was signed to Universal Classics and Jazz (UCJ) on the day she turned seventeen, as part of All Angels.

Her vocals and orchestrations feature on soundtracks for films, TV shows, games and for bands like Radiohead's 2016 album A Moon Shaped Pool and the Two Door Cinema Club's 2019 recording of Davide Rossi's arrangement of their 2012 song "Sun". She has contributed to soundtracks including The Sims 4, Star Wars Jedi: Fallen Order, The Snowman and the Snowdog, Cleaning Up, The Informer, I Give It a Year, Shaun the Sheep Movie, Theeb and Phantom Thread. She appeared in the feature film Yesterday as an onstage ukulele player at Wembley and vocalist on the soundtrack in 2019.

Chute is the co-founder of HEARD Collective, an artist collective who promote and support women in music.

Chute came first in the Coffee Music Project singer-songwriter competition with her song "London's on Fire" in July 2018. For the period December 2019 to January 2020, Chute was the Caffè Nero Artist of the Month, with five of her singles played in all stores of the worldwide chain.

In January 2021, the London Metropolitan Orchestra appointed Chute as the chorus mistress for their London Metropolitan Chorus.

=== Melanie Nakhla ===
Melanie Nakhla (born on 29 December 1988) was born in London. She moved with her family to Shrewsbury, Shropshire when she was three years old, where she attended Prestfelde School. She also attended Shrewsbury High School, until the age of 15. She began singing at a young age, joining the Shrewsbury Children's Choir when she was eight years old. She competed in the Oswestry Eisteddfod when she was ten years old coming first in a singing competition. She was a student at Wycombe Abbey in High Wycombe where she was head of choir. She has also appeared at the Royal Opening production of Romany Wood at the Theatre Severn in Shrewsbury.

=== Charlotte Ritchie ===
Charlotte Ritchie (born 29 August 1989) is an English actress and singer-songwriter. She is known for her roles as Alison Cooper in Ghosts, Oregon in Channel 4 comedy Fresh Meat, Hannah in Siblings, Alison in Dead Pixels, Barbara Gilbert in BBC drama Call the Midwife, and George in Feel Good.

=== Laura Wright ===
Laura Wright (born 17 June 1990) was a member of All Angels and left the group in 2010.

=== Rachel Fabri ===
Rachel Fabri (born 12 September 1985) was born in Malta, she trained at the Masquerade Theatre Arts School. She also trained privately under the tuition of soprano Gillian Zammit. Rachel is a Psychology graduate from the University of Malta. She later received a master's degree in Musical Theatre at the Guildford School of Acting. She is an actor as well as a singer, singing all kinds of different styles. Rachel Fabri is the newest member of the group, having joined All Angels in July 2010. Fabri's acting roles have included performances at the Edinburgh Fringe Festival as the lead role in 'Persephone', the London Palladium in 'Me and My Girl' and Abdel Akle in the Lee Tamahori film 'The Devil's Double'. In May 2014 Fabri married Andrew Camilleri. She gave birth to their first child in October 2017, a daughter.

Timeline

== Discography ==
=== Albums ===
- 2006: All Angels
- 2007: Into Paradise
- 2009: Fly Away

=== EPs ===
- 2010: Starlight

=== Singles ===
- 2006: "Songbird"
- 2006: "Angels"
- 2007: "Nothing Compares 2 U"

=== Featured ===
- 2007: The Number One Classical Album 2008 – "Sancte Deus (Nimrod)
- 2008: Tenor at the Movies – "Vois Sur Ton Chemin" from Les Choristes with Jonathan Ansell
- 2008: A New World – "Anytime Anywhere" with Will Martin
