= Into Paradise =

Into Paradise may refer to:

- Into Paradise (band), an indie rock group from Dublin, Ireland
- Into Paradise (All Angels album), 2007
- Into Paradise (Sissel album), 2006
- Into Paradise, a song by Michael Hofmann de Boer, was considered a Lostwave.

== See also ==
- Into Paradiso, a 2010 film
