= Rachel Fabri =

English singer-songwriter (born 1985)

- Born: 12 September 1985 (age 40)
- Origin: Malta
- Genres: Classical, operatic, musical theatre, pop
- Instrument: Vocals
- Website: www.rachelfabri.co.uk

Rachel Fabri (born 12 September 1985) is a Maltese singer-songwriter, who has been a member of the musical group All Angels from July 2010 until they disbanded in 2011.

== Personal life ==
Raised in Malta, Fabri trained at the Masquerade Theatre Arts School, also privately under the tuition of soprano Gillian Zammit. She made her Malta theatre debut playing the title role in Masquerade's 'Annie' at the Manoel Theatre aged 12.

In 2007, Fabri completed her bachelor's degree in psychology (B.Psy Hons.) from the University of Malta and also gained various diplomas in child psychology. This, alongside her musical training, led her to teach singing at schools such as Italia Conti Academy of Theatre Arts and Stagecoach Theatre Arts in the UK. She also received a master's degree in musical theatre at the Guildford School of Acting. After 5 years living in the UK, Fabri moved back to Malta to take on the position of Head of Music at Masquerade School for the Performing Arts, co- directing the play A... My Name Is Alice for the Malta International Theatre Festival and giving private singing tuition, voice lectures, masterclasses and seminars.

In May 2014 Fabri married boyfriend Andrew Camilleri and in October 2017 she gave birth to their first child, a daughter.

== All Angels ==
In 2010 Fabri formed part of the British, platinum-disc, classical-crossover quartet All Angels. With All Angels, she performed at venues such as Wembley Stadium at the 2011 UEFA Champions League Final, Royal Albert Hall, Cadogan Hall, Manchester Arena, Birmingham Genting Arena and the Sheffield Arena. Together they released the EP ‘Starlight’

Fabri has performed alongside leading artistes such as Alexandra Burke, Katherine Jenkins, Dionne Bromfield, Lesley Garrett, and before HRH Earl of Wessex. The quartet also toured America, Spain and Crete. As part of the quartet, Fabri has been seen on BBC1’s The One Show, the Channel 4 feature on All Angels, and at the 2011 Classic Brit Awards. Together, the group released an EP called ‘Starlight’.

Fabri with Edward Ellul became performers of the song "Flimkien - Together We Can" by FIDEM Charity Foundation with a view to supporting the people working to keep Malta running during tough times of the COVID-19 pandemic.

== Other selected performances ==
Fabri's roles have included performances at the Edinburgh Festival Fringe as the lead role in a musical based on the Greek myth of Persephone, at the London Palladium in 'Me and My Girl' and at the Henley Fringe Festival as the lead role Cassie in 'Make Believe the Musical'. She also featured as a guest soloist on the UK tour of the musical revue 'Beyond the Barricade'. - this tour was the prize she won for being a finalist in the first edition of L-iSfida, a TV talent show that aired in Malta in 2005.

Malta theatre roles, guest performances and productions include: Guest soloist in the HSBC Summer Concert alongside the Malta Philharmonic Orchestra and Broadway star Kim Criswell, playing the role of Snow White in the Masquerade Christmas pantomime 'The Curse of Snow White' at the Manoel Theatre (2012/2013), with the Animae Gospel Choir at the Mediterranean Conference Centre Go Teatru Unplugged 2016, featuring as a lead soloist in the 'Comedy Tonight' and 'Simply Webber' musical revues, also and participating as a guest soloist in 'Movie Spectacular' at the Mediterranean Conference Centre, alongside the Malta Philharmonic Orchestra.

Other Malta roles include ‘With Friends Like These’, and 'Cinderella into the Woods’. In 2016 she played Regina in Malta's longest running Rock of Ages (musical). and Catherine' in '1565 - The Musical in Concert', alongside the Malta Philharmonic Orchestra, which was held in 2015 at the Mediterranean Conference Centre for the 450th anniversary of the Great Siege of Malta.

In 2016 she played the role of Maria in The Sound of Music at the Mediterranean Conference Centre and in 2015 Cathy in 'The Last Five Years', which was held at the Blue Box Msida, in November 2015.

== Discography ==
- 2017 'Human too'
- 2017 'Let You Go'
- 2017 'For Good' with Nadia Vella
- 2015 'Forever Yours' (Solo album)
- 2014 'Oh Holy Night'
- 2014 'Have Yourself a Merry Little Christmas'
- 2010 'Starlight' (EP) with All Angels

== Movies ==
- 2011 The Devil's Double - As Abdel Akle

(Fabri also performed 'Ensani' on the soundtrack)

== Television ==
Fabri appeared With All Angels on BBC1’s The One Show, the Channel 4 feature on All Angels, and the 2011 Classic Brit Awards. She was also a resident singer on one of Malta’s most popular TV shows ‘Tista’ Tkun Int’ (2005). In 2006 she sang on the NET Television (Malta) 'Voices live' concert and in 2016 performed for the same channel on the Entertainers'show.

== Newspapers and magazines ==
Fabri has been featured in Malta newspapers such as Times of Malta, L-Orizzont, Malta Today, The Malta Independent and was the subject of an article in the Fall 2016 issue of the Classical Crossover US magazine.
