= 1959 in radio =

The year 1959 saw a number of significant happenings in radio broadcasting history.

== Events ==
- 3 February – A light-aircraft crash near Clear Lake, Iowa, kills three musicians: Buddy Holly, Ritchie Valens and KTRM-Beaumont deejay J. P. "The Big Bopper" Richardson, Jr., as well as the plane's pilot. The tragedy will go on to become known as "The Day The Music Died".
- 11 May – At 10 am, KROW 960 AM in San Francisco switches its call letters to KABL. The KABL name will stay with the station until September 2004.
- German-American musicologist Karl Haas starts Adventures in Good Music at WJR in Detroit, Michigan.
- Polskie Radio broadcasts the drama Pasażerka z kabiny 45 (Passenger from Cabin Number 45), written by Zofia Posmysz based on her time in wartime concentration camps and featuring Aleksandra Śląska and Jan Świderski.

== Debuts ==
- 14 March – Tulane University's WTUL signs on for the first time. Owned and operated by Tulane University, this progressive-music station. will give Jerry Springer his start in broadcasting.
- 3 April – Pick of the Week is first broadcast on the BBC Home Service.
- 7 June – KKLS signs on in Rapid City.

== Closings ==
- 2 January – CBS ends Our Gal Sunday, This Is Nora Drake, Backstage Wife and Road of Life.
- 2 January – The Kate Smith Show ends its run on network radio (Mutual).
- 9 January – The Howard Miller Show ends its run on network radio (CBS).
- 24 April - NBC Bandstand ends its run on network radio (NBC).

== Births ==
- 2 January – Joe Bevilacqua, award-winning American voice actor, radio producer, dramatist, humorist and documentary film producer.
- 9 January – Andy Kershaw, English world music presenter.
- 27 January – Cris Collinsworth, American sportscaster, previously American football player.
- 28 January – Randi Rhodes, American radio host.
- 22 May – Graham Fellows, English comedy performer.
- 3 June – John Carlson, American conservative talk radio host on KVI in Seattle.
- 7 June – Mike Pence, American politician who begins his career on radio station WIFE-FM (WRCR-FM).
- 13 August – Danny Bonaduce, American comedian, actor and broadcast personality.

== Deaths ==
- 9 January – Hans Bredow, "father of German radio" (born 1879).
- 3 March – Lou Costello, American comic actor (The Abbott and Costello Show), heart attack (born 1906).
- 6 December – Len Doyle, American actor, played investigator Harrigan on Mr. District Attorney (born 1893).

== See also ==
- This Gun That I Have in My Right Hand Is Loaded
