= World Orphan Week =

World Orphan Week (WOW) began in the UK in 2005, and is owned by SOS Children's Villages UK. It is a week developed to raise awareness for the needs of orphaned and abandoned children around the world.

World Orphan Week is a week for groups and individuals to volunteer their time and fundraise to support programs that can support these children in need.

This event is growing in popularity with launches in the UK, the US, and Canada.

SOS Children's Villages invites schools, community groups, individuals and anyone interested to form their own fundraisers for the campaign.

== History ==
World Orphan Week began in 2005, originally running in October, before moving to February.

In the United Kingdom, WOW 2009 took place 9–15 February, and in The United States WOW 2008 took place 5–11 October. SOS Children's Villages, USA held an online video contest called "WOW Us" to promote World Orphan Week 2008. SOS Children's Villages Canada launched World Orphan Week in Canada, in October 2008.

The campaign ran annually in the UK until 2013, where it was on hiatus until 2018, where it will be relaunched as part of SOS Children's Villages UK's 50th anniversary.

== Current ==
World Orphan Week 2018 will run from 3–10 February 2018, as the campaign relaunches as part of SOS Children's Villages UK's 50th anniversary. The campaign looks to involve schools, companies, and community groups, as well as businesses local to Cambridge, where the UK headquarters are located. WOW is a national project, run across the UK, aiming to raise awareness for the large number of children missing one or both parents across the world.

== See also ==
- Orphan's Day
