= Prospect Theatre Company =

- Formation: 1961
- Dissolved: 1980
- Type: Theatre group
- Purpose: Classical
- Location: Cambridge and Edinburgh
- Artistic director: Toby Robertson
- Notable members: Ian McKellen, Timothy West

The Prospect Theatre Company was an English company founded, as Prospect Productions, in 1961. Based at the Arts Theatre, Cambridge from 1964 until 1969, the company, with Toby Robertson as artistic director and Richard Cottrell as associate director, toured both nationally and internationally with a mainly classical repertoire, providing notable appearances of such actors as Ian McKellen and Timothy West. The company became closely associated with the Edinburgh Festival after its first appearance there in 1967.

Separating from the Arts Theatre in 1969, the company, renamed The Prospect Theatre Company, survived without a permanent base for the next eight years under the direction of Toby Robertson, mounting productions in which Derek Jacobi and Dorothy Tutin made significant appearances. Eventually the company found a new home at London's Old Vic in 1977: two years later it became the Old Vic Theatre Company. Though noted for its exemplary ensemble playing, the company lost its Arts Council of Great Britain funding in 1980 after Timothy West's first season as Robertson's successor, leading to Prospect's demise.

== Early years, Cambridge and Edinburgh ==
The Prospect Theatre Company was born out of undergraduate productions at Oxford and founded in 1961 by Iain Mackintosh and Elizabeth Sweeting to present a summer season of plays at the Oxford Playhouse. They bought the company 'Prospect Productions Ltd' for a nominal sum from lawyer Laurence Harbottle, founder of the arts law firm Harbottle & Lewis. Harbottle had earlier created Prospect for a single summer season at Deal, Kent, to gain theatre experience. He became the first chairman of Prospect. A successful first season led to a further season in 1962. The following year, when the Playhouse closed for renovations, Prospect became a touring company associated with the Century Theatre. Toby Robertson directed the last play of the season, Vanbrugh's The Provoked Wife, with Eileen Atkins and Trevor Martin. The Provoked Wife opened at the 350-seat mobile Century Theatre which was parked by Mackintosh in an idyllic setting beside the Thames for the summer of 1963 while the Oxford Playhouse was closed for remodelling. The production was the first show for over a century at the newly restored Georgian Theatre Royal in Richmond, North Yorkshire, then transferred to the Vaudeville Theatre, London. The success of the Oxford seasons prompted the idea that Prospect should present productions beyond the summer season each year.

In 1964, with support from the Arts Council of Great Britain and Dr. George Rylands, Prospect became a touring company based at the Arts Theatre, Cambridge, with Toby Robertson as artistic director, Richard Cottrell as associate director, and Iain Mackintosh as administrator. Between 1964 and 1966 Prospect staged 15 productions, presenting well-known plays as well as several rarely performed Classics including Vanbrugh's The Confederacy, with Robert Eddison and Hy Hazell, to celebrate the third centenary of Vanbrugh's birth, and Etherege's The Man of Mode, and a number of new plays. Timothy West joined the Company in 1966 to play Prospero. Later that year Prospect had its first invitation to the Edinburgh Festival.

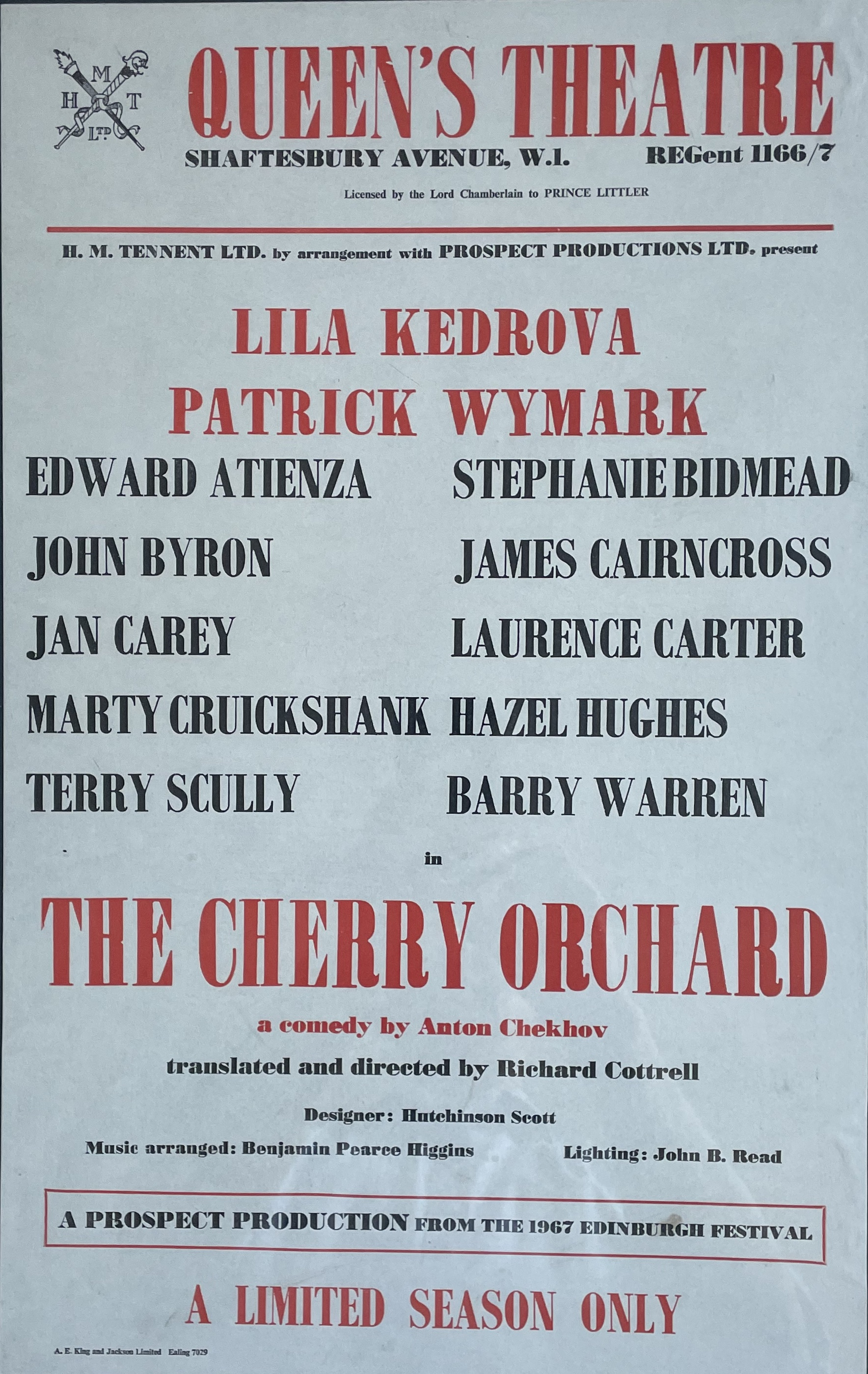
Poster for the Prospect Theatre Company production of the Cherry Orchard, Queens Theatre, London W1

Prospect's first Edinburgh Festival appearance in 1967 was with Chekhov's The Cherry Orchard, Lila Kedrova playing Madam Ranyevskaya in Cottrell's production. The production transferred to London, where Kedrova won the Evening Standard Best Actress of the Year Award. 1968 saw the production of Prospect's first "musical" - Gay's Beggar's Opera, which was also the first Prospect show to be televised, and in 1969 the Company appeared for the first time at the Assembly Hall. By 1970 Prospect and the Cambridge Theatre Company had successfully divided with Prospect touring and the Cambridge Theatre Company resident at the Art's Theatre.

At the 1969 Edinburgh festival Ian McKellen made his breakthrough performances with the company as Richard II (directed by Cottrell) and Marlowe's Edward II (directed by Robertson), the latter in the play's first professional revival for 300 years and causing a storm of protest over the enactment of the homosexual Edward's lurid death. Timothy West appeared as McKellen's sparring partner in both those productions, which subsequently toured Britain and Europe before being staged at the Mermaid Theatre in London and breaking box-office records at the Piccadilly Theatre.

Between 1967 and 1977 Prospect was invited to appear at eight Edinburgh International Festivals, and largely as a result of its close association with the Edinburgh Festival, Prospect was asked to tour abroad for the British Council, visiting the Middle East, Russia, Hong Kong, and Australia. In 1970 Prospect took King Lear to La Fenice in Venice with Timothy West as Lear becoming the first company to present Shakespeare at that theatre in English. Mackintosh insisted that if a production made a profit, the actors got more money and this condition was even applied to productions transferred into the West End produced by Theatre Projects.

== Years of touring ==
In 1969 the Company was asked to extend its touring to the large "No 1" theatres in the regions; at the same time the Cambridge Arts Theatre wanted Prospect to help in the formation of a new theatre company. As these two developments pointed in totally different directions with implications of a conflicting scale of work, Richard Cottrell left Prospect to become director of the newly formed Cambridge Theatre Company: Toby Robertson became director of Prospect, and its role as the UK's leading touring company was recognised, with its new name - The Prospect Theatre Company.

Under Robertson, the company pioneered a style of production in which stage designs and setting were kept to a minimum, partly from the belief that Shakespeare's plays in particular benefited from an uncluttered approach; this style also suited the company's needs when touring regional theatres, for which flexibility of staging was essential. Emphasis was placed instead on quality acting and strikingly designed costumes, complemented by lighting and incidental music. Carl Davis composed several scores for the company, including for a modern dress production of Love's Labours Lost (1971), Pericles (1973), and Pilgrim's Progress (1974/5) which led directly to the musical War Music (1977) with words by Homer and Christopher Logue and music by Donald Fraser.

From 1970 to 1976 four major productions were created each year. As the only major company touring nationally, the choice of repertoire tended to be drawn more from the classics at the expense of new work. But alongside several Shakespeare productions the company staged such plays as Thomas Otway's Venice Preserv'd, Charles Macklin's The Man of the World, Turgenev's A Month in the Country (with Derek Jacobi, Timothy West and Dorothy Tutin, who won two major acting awards for her performance), Chekhov's Ivanov, and Peter Shaffer's Royal Hunt of the Sun. A series of chamber works were commissioned, including Jane McCulloch's The Grand Tour for the Entry into Europe celebrations - an entertainment seen in London, Edinburgh, and the 1974 Brighton Festival.

The strain of touring and meeting the increasingly high standards expected by theatre audiences throughout the country began to tell, and even with occasional London seasons either at the Round House or in the West end, it was felt increasingly desirable that Prospect should once again have a permanent and preferably metropolitan base to sustain its regional work.

== Joining the Old Vic ==
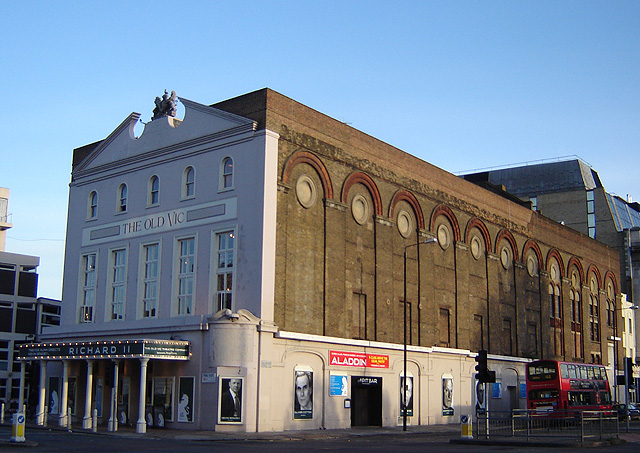
The Old Vic Theatre, London

Looking for a suitable London base, Robertson believed that the Old Vic would best meet the company's needs and would add lustre to its reputation. For two years he sustained a campaign for the Old Vic to make Prospect its resident company. For the Old Vic, Robertson's overtures proved increasingly hard to resist in the face of poor box office returns achieved by productions staged by other companies at the theatre; against this, Prospect staged a highly successful season which opened in May 1977, including Hamlet with Derek Jacobi, Antony and Cleopatra with Alec McCowen and Dorothy Tutin; and Saint Joan with Eileen Atkins. In July the Governors of The Old Vic announced "a marriage that was all but a merger" between the Vic and Prospect. In September Toby Robertson, director of Prospect, was asked to take artistic control of The Old Vic, and Christopher Richards, general manager of The Old Vic, became general manager of Prospect.

One major problem, though, was the terms of Prospect's funding by the Arts Council: this was on the basis of it being a touring company, and the Council - already funding the National Theatre and the Royal Shakespeare Company in London - could not accept a case for a third major company in the capital and repeatedly refused requests to fund any London seasons staged by Prospect. Therefore any London-based productions would have to succeed financially without Arts Council support. Prospect's first season at the Old Vic recouped its costs but left no surplus to fund future productions. Further stagings by visiting companies were box office failures and stretched the theatre's finances to breaking point.

Yet Prospect continued to draw audiences to the Old Vic where other companies failed. The company played a five-month season from January to May 1978, adding Twelfth Night to their repertory, and a four-month season from September to December presenting The Rivals, The Lady's Not for Burning with Atkins, and King Lear with Anthony Quayle in the title role. In December that year, the governors of the Old Vic agreed to a five-year contract with Prospect, announcing to the press on 23 April that henceforth they would be styled "Prospect Productions Ltd., trading as the Old Vic Company". Unfortunately Prospect's touring commitments kept the company out of the theatre for the first half of 1979, leaving the theatre to sink further into debt. The company returned in July with Jacobi's Hamlet (toured afterwards to Denmark, Australia and China, the first English theatre company to tour that country), followed by Romeo and Juliet, and The Government Inspector with Ian Richardson. The following season, however, proved controversial: the double bill of The Padlock and Miss in Her Teens, to mark the bicentenary of David Garrick's death, and a revival of What the Butler Saw were deemed by the Arts Council unsuitable for touring repertory. An internal report by Prospect now questioned "whether Prospect can any longer satisfy the triple task of filling the Vic, of satisfying the [Arts Council] Director of Touring's requirements for product of a certain familiar sort, and of realising the vision of Toby Robertson".

Robertson was in effect fired from the post of artistic director in 1980 while he was abroad with the company in China, Timothy West replacing him. The following season, West's first as Robertson's successor, saw Macbeth with Peter O'Toole, The Merchant of Venice with West as Shylock, and a gala performance presented to the Queen Mother to celebrate her eightieth birthday. On 22 December 1980, four days after the gala performance, the Arts Council withdrew its funding from the Company, sealing its demise. In January the company left for its pre-arranged tour of Hong Kong and Australia. Appeals to the Council for funding to be reinstated were denied. The company gave a final season at the Old Vic staging The Merchant of Venice, then gave a final tour of Europe, giving its last performance in Rome on 14 June before disbanding.

== Sources ==
- Rowell, George (1993). The Old Vic Theatre: A History. Cambridge: Cambridge University Press. ISBN 9780521346252.
