= Elizabeth Sweeting =

British arts administrator (1914–1999)

Elizabeth Sweeting (19 November 1914 – 7 December 1999) was a leader in performing arts and arts administration in England and Australia.

== Biography ==
She was born 19 November 1914 in London. After receiving a scholarship she graduated from Royal Holloway College, University of London, with a BA (Hons) and a master's degree.

Sweeting joined English Opera Group in 1947 as their deputy manager. Concurrently she became general manager of the Aldeburgh Festival. Living in Oxford for 30 years, she was general manager of the Oxford Playhouse between 1956 and 1961, subsequently acting as secretary till 1976. In 1961 she set up the Prospect Theatre Company with Iain Mackintosh

Sweeting devoted many years to caring for her mother, who died in 1974. While visiting Adelaide, Australia, as a visiting professor in 1974, she was invited to become a consultant to the South Australia new Arts Council. She was director until 1981, establishing Australia's first arts management graduate courses. She returned to the UK in 1981 and retired in 1985 to Ironbridge, Shropshire.

She died following a heart attack on 7 December 1999.
