= Sodom and Gomorrah (play) =

1943 play by Jean Giraudoux

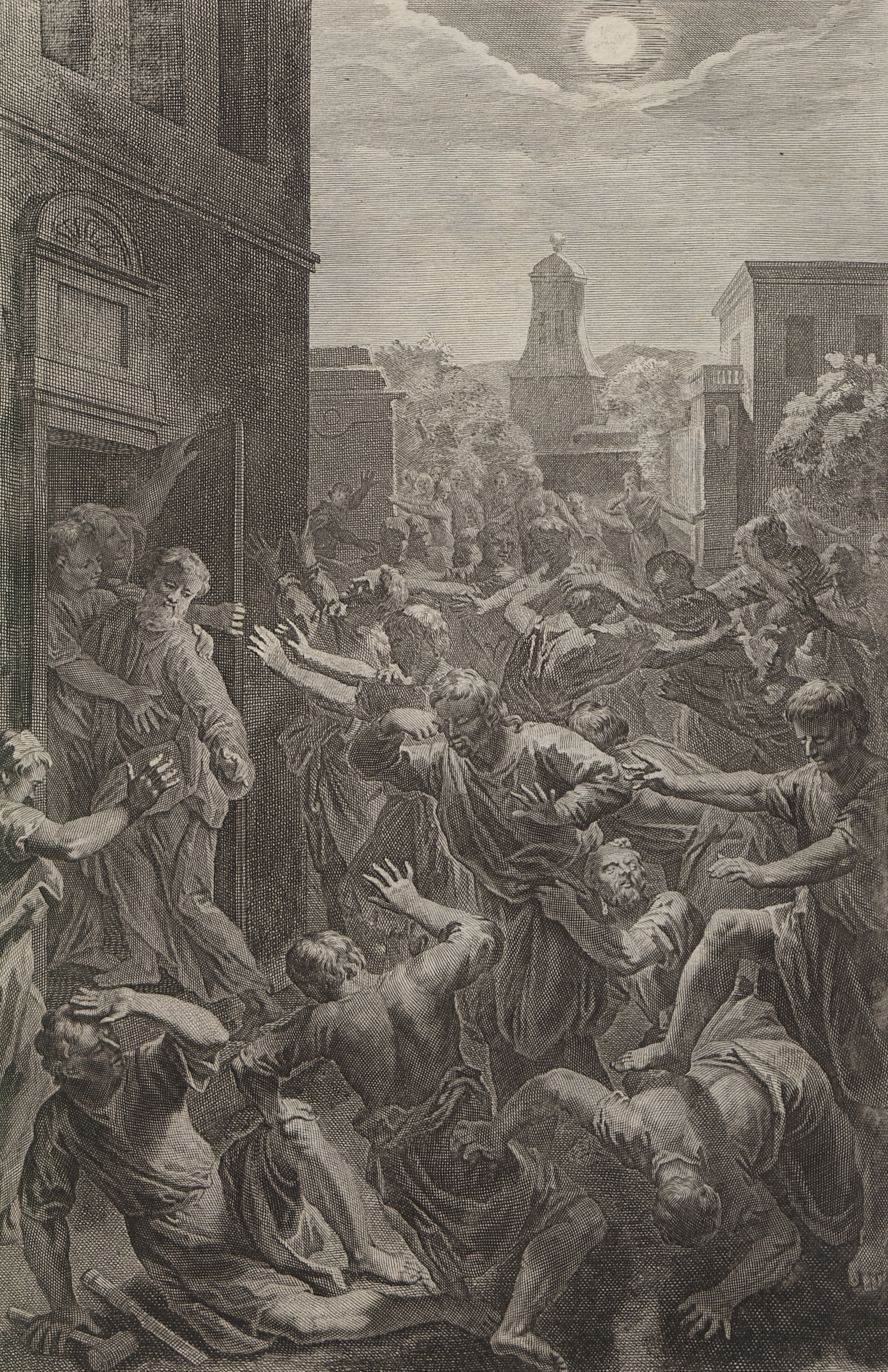
- The Sodomites struck with blindness (Genesis 19:11) illustrations of 1728 by Gerard Hoet
- Written by: Jean Giraudoux
- Characters: Lia, Jean, Ruth, Jacques, Luc, Martha, Pierre, Judith, Salome, Athalie, Samson, Delilah
- Original language: French
- Subject: Divine retribution for human failure
- Genre: Tragedy
- Setting: Biblical city of Sodom

Premiere
- Date premiered: 11 October 1943
- Place premiered: Théâtre Hébertot in Paris

Sodom and Gomorrah (French title: Sodome et Gomorrhe) is a play by French dramatist Jean Giraudoux (1882–1944). Composed as a tragedy set in the biblical city of Sodom, the play was first published in 1943.

== History ==
Although Giraudoux was a prolific writer before World War II, Sodome et Gomorrhe was his only new work produced during the German occupation. The play was first translated into English by Herma Briffault in Barry Ulanov's Makers of the Modern Theatre (1961).

== Synopsis ==
One of Giradoux's darkest works, the themes and lessons of Sodom and Gomorrah are "deeply pessimistic". The play explores the fundamental differences between man and woman, their different expectations and the unlikelihood of their satisfaction. The plot begins with an angel proclaiming that the people of the two cities will be destroyed unless they can show among themselves an example of true love. The characters of Lia and Jean are introduced as the best evidence, but over the course of the play their fidelity erodes, ending with Lia's seemingly wanton betrayal of Jean. Lasting love of any kind appears impossible. Inevitably, divine judgment condemns the two cities, and mankind itself, for failing to prove the existence of even one happy couple.

== Original production ==
Sodom and Gomorrah was first performed on 11 October 1943 in Paris at the Théâtre Hébertot in a production by Georges Douking. With a cast that included the popular French stars Edwige Feuillère as Lia and Gérard Philipe as Jean, this original production was a commercial success and ran for over two hundred performances.
