= Orphan's Day =

Orphan's Day is a national day in Egypt, celebrated on the first Friday of April, since 2004. It was founded by Dar Al-Orman, Egypt's largest charitable organization.
