= Romany Wood =

Musical work for children

Romany Wood is a 40-minute musical work for children's voices, narrator and orchestra. The piece was written to connect children with classical music and to raise money for charity.

Romany Wood has over a hundred performances, including two Royal Charity Gala concerts: one for Prince Edward to open the new Theatre Severn in Shrewsbury and the second for the Duchess of Cornwall, to raise money for the National Osteoporosis Society, at a performance at the Birmingham Royal Ballet School. The work has been broadcast on Classic FM, excerpts of which have been performed on BBC Songs of Praise. In addition, Romany Wood has been performed four times at the Birmingham Symphony Hall and seven times in English Cathedrals.

Personalities involved in compering or narrating in performances include Michael Maloney, Jasper Carrott, Adrian Chiles, Alan Titchmarsh, Timothy West, Ian MacMillan, Richard Stilgoe, and Nick Owen.

The music was composed by David Gaukroger in 2002. The libretto, by David Carr, is based on a children's story by Beshlie.
