= Cauchon =

Cauchon is a surname. Notable people with the surname include:

- Pierre Cauchon (1371–1442), bishop of Beauvais
- Joseph-Édouard Cauchon (1816–1885), Canadian politician, physics textbook author, and railroad investor
- Martin Cauchon (born 1962), Canadian lawyer and politician
- Robert Cauchon (1900–1980), Canadian politician
