= Film adaptations of Crime and Punishment =

There have been at least 30 film adaptations of Fyodor Dostoevsky's 1866 novel Crime and Punishment.

== List of films ==
- 1909: Prestuplenie i nakazanie (Crime and Punishment), 1909 Russian film directed by V. Goncharov.
- 1913: Prestuplenie i nakazanie (Crime and Punishment), 1913 Russian film directed by I. Vronsky
- 1915: Prestuplenie i nakazanie (Crime and Punishment), 1915 Russian film.
- 1917: Crime and Punishment, 1917 US silent film directed by Lawrence B. McGill and starring Derwent Hall Caine.
- 1919: Rodion Raskolnikow, 1919 Russian film.
- 191?: Raskolnikow, 1910s Russian film.
- 1923: Raskolnikow (aka Crime and Punishment), German film made in 1923, directed by Robert Wiene.
- 1924: Paper Parinam, 1924 Indian production.
- 1935: Crime and Punishment, directed by Josef von Sternberg and starring Peter Lorre, Edward Arnold, Marian Marsh, Douglass Dumbrille, Gene Lockhart, and Mrs Patrick Campbell.
- 1935: Crime and Punishment, 1935 French film directed by Pierre Chenal.
- 1940: Prestuplenie i nakazanie (Crime and Punishment), 1940 Soviet film directed by Pavel Kolomoytsev
- 1945: Crime and Punishment, 1945 Swedish film directed by Hampe Faustman.
- 1951: Crimen y castigo, 1951 Mexican production directed by Fernando de Fuentes.
- 1956: Crime and Punishment, French film of 1956, directed by Georges Lampin and starring Lino Ventura and Jean Gabin.
- 1957: 'El gharima waal ikab, 1957 Egyptian production in Arabic, directed by Ibrahim Emara.
- 1958: Phir Subha Hogi, 1958 Hindi film directed by Ramesh Saigal
- 1959: Pickpocket, 1959 French film directed by Robert Bresson
- 1959: Crime and Punishment U.S.A., 1959 American film, directed by Denis Sanders, adapted by Walter Newman and starring Mary Murphy, Frank Silvera, Marian Seldes, Eve McVeagh, and George Hamilton (his first credited film role).
- 1970: Crime and Punishment, 1970 Soviet film, starring Georgi Taratorkin, Tatyana Bedova, Vladimir Basov, and Victoria Fyodorova, and directed by Lev Kulidzhanov.
- 1971: Crime et châtiment, 1971 French film directed by Stellio Lorenzi, starring François Marthouret and Jean Topart
- 1973: 'Neramu Siksha, 1973 Indian production in Telugu, directed by K. Vishwanath.
- 1974: 'Jurm Aur Sazaa, 1974 Indian film in Hindi, directed by Nisar Ahmad Ansari.
- 1979: Crime and Punishment, 1979 television serial starring Timothy West and John Hurt.
- 1983: Rikos ja Rangaistus (1983; aka Crime and Punishment), the debut film of the Finnish director Aki Kaurismäki, with Markku Toikka in the lead role; the story is set in modern-day Helsinki.
- 1987: Elu Suttina Kote (Seven rounded fort), Indian Kannada-language film directed by Gowrishankar, with Ambareesh in the lead role. The film is loosely based on Crime and Punishment and enjoys a classic status in Kannada cinema industry.
- 1994: Sin Compasión, 1994 adaptation of the novel, directed by Francisco Lombardi and set in Lima, Peru.
- 1994: Zločin i kazna (Crime and Punishment), the name of two separate 1994 Croatian productions, one directed by Dražen Žarković, the other by Jasna Zastavniković.
- 1996: The Rockford Files: Punishment and Crime, 1996 US film starring James Garner and directed by David Chase, was loosely based on the novel.
- 1998: Dostoevsky's Crime and Punishment, 1998 TV movie starring Patrick Dempsey, Ben Kingsley and Julie Delpy.
- 2000: Crime and Punishment in Suburbia, 2000 adaptation, set in modern America and "loosely based" on the novel.
- 2000: Zbrodnia i Kara, 2000 Polish film directed by Piotr Dumała.
- 2002: Crime and Punishment, 2002 adaptation, starring Crispin Glover, John Hurt, Vanessa Redgrave and Margot Kidder.
- 2004: Nina, 2004 Brazilian loose adaptation of the novel, directed by Heitor Dhalia and starring Guta Stresser.
- 2012: Student, 2012 Kazakhstani film directed by Darezhan Omirbaev.
- 2013: Norte: Hangganan ng Kasaysayan known internationally as Norte, the End of History, 2013 film by Filipino Director, Lav Diaz.
- 2016: Crime & Punishment, independent Australian feature film by producer/director, Andrew O'Keefe.
- 2018: The Bridge of Sleep, Iranian film directed by Oktay Baraheni.
- 2019: A Shadow Confined, a Bulgarian surrealist short film loosely based on the novel, produced and directed by Asparuh Frangov.
