= All Angels (album) =

Studio album by All Angels
- Released: 13 November 2006
- Genre: Classical crossover, Operatic pop
- Length: 48:06; 50:03 (with bonus track)
- Label: UCJ (Universal)

All Angels chronology
All Angels (2006)	Into Paradise (2007)

Professional ratings
Review scores
Source	Rating
Allmusic	3/5 stars

All Angels is the debut album by English Classical crossover group All Angels, released in November 2006. The album sold 33,000 in its first week in the UK becoming the fastest selling classical debut in UK chart history and reached the Top 10 on the UK Album Chart. It was later certified Gold in December of the same year. The album peaked at number 99 on the Australian ARIA Charts in September 2007.

== Track listing ==
1. "Songbird" – 2:54
2. "The Flower Duet" – 4:56
3. "Salve Regina (by Pachelbel)" – 3:47
4. "Steal Away" – 2:44
5. "Windmills Of Your Mind" – 3:05
6. "Barcarolle" – 3:25
7. "Silent Night" – 3:14
8. "Intermezzo" – 3:04
9. "Ave Verum Corpus" – 3:31
10. "Angels" – 4:19
11. "Ave Maria" – 3:28
12. "Pokarekare Ana" – 3:15
13. "Agnus Dei" – 6:24
14. "Amazing Grace" – 1:57
  - Released only on the EU Version and iTunes Store EU version

=== 2007 Special Edition ===
The special edition scheduled for release on 30 April 2007 is currently:

- "Silent Night" track removed

And additional tracks to the UK Version of:

- "Sancte Deus"
- "Make Me A Channel Of Your Peace"
- "Pie Jesu"
