= Animae Gospel Choir =

The Animae Gospel Choir is a vocal ensemble based in Malta. It was founded in 2008 by Glen Vella and it has since grown into a 23 gospel singer-troupe.

== History ==
Launched in 2008, the Animae Gospel Choir was founded by Maltese singer Glen Vella, who, after experiencing the sound of the Soweto Gospel Choir in the Netherlands, joined forces with Pamela Bezzina, who is the Choir's vocal director and arranger, and Leontine Spiteri to create the choir.

The name ‘Animae’ of Latin origin translates to the word ‘soul’, anima, and the Animae Gospel Choir aims to be 'a spiritual ensemble that promotes positivity and unity'.

The Animae Gospel Choir is made up of 23 singers including three who have represented Malta at the Eurovision Song Contest (Debbie Scerri (1997), Glen Vella (2011) and Amber Bondin (2015)). Gina Abercrombie-Winstanley, the current US Ambassador to Malta, is also a member of the Choir.

In 2009 the Choir held its first national, musical performance, entitled Animae Gospel Choir in Concert, at the Manoel Theatre in Valletta.

Guests Chiara Siracusa (of Eurovision) and Ivan Grech (of Winter Moods) joined the troupe on stage, along with a seven-piece band that was directed by Christian Borg. The 90-minute programme included classics from the genres of pop, soul and gospel music, and featured songs by Michael Jackson, Zucchero and Anastacia, among others.

On 30 July 2010, the Animae Gospel Choir performed two songs alongside Winter Moods at a concert attended by 10,000 people - one of the biggest audiences ever amassed by a Maltese band.

The second Animae Gospel Choir in Concert took place over two nights in March 2012, and was held under the patronage of George Abela, the then President of Malta. Taking place in Republic Hall at the Mediterranean Conference Centre in Valletta, which is Malta's largest conference centre, the concert included 'Ain't No Mountain High Enough' and 'Livin' on a Prayer'.

In 2012 the Choir also took part in the Parkinson's Awareness Week organised by the MPDA (Malta Parkinson's Disease Association) to help raise awareness about Parkinson's disease.

Following the release of their first single 'Ninni La Tibkix Iżjed' in 2013, the Animae Gospel Choir was also invited to perform this traditional, Maltese, Christmas anthem and other worship tunes at St John's Co-Cathedral in Valletta, during the official Christmas 2014 celebrations.

In 2014, the Choir took part in the revival of the Maltese epic 'Gensna' ('Our Nation'), and introduced the revolutionary ‘Animae Experience’, which has created a platform for non-members to interact with the choir through song and worship. In September of the same year the Choir, under the patronage of Marie-Louise Coleiro Preca, the current President of Malta, performed during MaltaDay at Westminster Cathedral in London, while in December they sang an a cappella rendition of the Maltese National Anthem outside the Grandmaster's Palace in Valletta during Malta's official 40th anniversary celebrations of the Republic.

In 2015 the ensemble gave a 90-minute performance on the bicentenary of the birth of St John Bosco, and they are now working on their third, national Animae Gospel Choir in Concert, which will take place in October 2015.

== Notable singers ==
Singers include Amber Bondin, Debbie Scerri, Gina Abercrombie-Winstanley and Glen Vella

== Discography ==
Ninni La Tibkix Iżjed

- Released: 2013
