= Toby Robertson =

British director

Sholto David Maurice Robertson OBE (29 November 1928 – 4 July 2012), known as Toby Robertson, was the artistic director of the Prospect Theatre Company from 1964 to 1978. He was recognized as having "re-established the good name and reputation of touring theatre in the UK after it had become a byword for second-rate tattiness in the 1950s".

== Early life ==
The son of David Lambert Robertson, a naval officer, and his wife, Felicity Douglas, a playwright, Robertson was educated at Stowe School, Buckinghamshire, and Trinity College, Cambridge. Christened Sholto, he became known as "Toby" (he claimed, as a result of reciting "To be, or not to be" from an early age). He did his national service with the East African Rifles.

He appeared in a Marlowe Society production of Romeo and Juliet at the Phoenix Theatre in London, in 1952, and with the Elizabethan Players in a Richard II in Kidderminster in 1954. He appeared at Stratford-upon-Avon in 1957 in Peter Brook's production of The Tempest with John Gielgud (whom he also understudied). The following year he made his professional London debut in Eugene O'Neill's The Iceman Cometh, directed by Peter Wood, at the Arts theatre.

== Television and film ==
Robertson worked in television between 1959 and 1963, directing more than 25 new plays, several for ITV's Armchair Theatre and the BBC's The Wednesday Play. He also assisted Brook on his 1963 film Lord of the Flies. In 1962, Robertson directed Maxim Gorky's The Lower Depths for the Royal Shakespeare Company.

== Prospect Theatre Company ==
Robertson became involved as a director with the Prospect Theatre Company, which was launched at the Oxford Playhouse in 1961. When in 1964 the company found a permanent base at the Arts Theatre, Cambridge, Robertson became its artistic director and annually staged three to four classical plays.

Prospect pioneered a type of theatre production in which emphasis was placed on quality acting and strikingly designed costumes, while its minimal stage designs enabled the company to easily tour regional theatres. It was with Prospect that Ian McKellen made his breakthrough performances with the company of Richard II (directed by Cottrell) and Marlowe's Edward II (directed by Robertson) at the Edinburgh festival in 1969, the latter causing a storm of protest over the enactment of the homosexual Edward's lurid death. Both those productions subsequently toured Britain and Europe before being staged at the Mermaid Theatre in London and breaking box-office records at the Piccadilly Theatre.

Derek Jacobi first played Hamlet for Prospect in 1977, a production which when revived in 1979 toured Denmark, Australia and the first-ever Western theatrical tour of China. Other actors whose careers were effectively launched or enhanced by Prospect included Prunella Scales, Dorothy Tutin and Timothy West, and the company mounted critically acclaimed productions of plays by Shakespeare, Chekhov, Dryden, Gogol and John Vanbrugh, as well as Cottrell's adaptation of E. M. Forster's A Room with a View.

However, when Prospect attempted to make the Old Vic its home from 1977, there were questions whether this contravened the terms of their touring subsidy. Matters of repertoire also became controversial, when a proposed season for late 1979 - which included the double bill of The Padlock and Miss in Her Teens, to mark the bicentenary of David Garrick's death, and a revival of What the Butler Saw - were vetoed by the Arts Council as unsuitable for touring repertory. An internal report by Prospect then questioned "whether Prospect can any longer satisfy the triple task of filling the Vic, of satisfying the [Arts Council] Director of Touring's requirements for product of a certain familiar sort, and of realizing the vision of Toby Robertson". As a result, Robertson was in effect fired from the post of artistic director in 1980 while he was abroad with the company in China. His friendship with Timothy West, his successor as artistic director at the Old Vic, was irreparably soured.

== Theatr Clwyd ==
Robertson subsequently ran Theatr Clwyd in north Wales between 1985 and 1992. He persuaded several leading actors, including Vanessa Redgrave, Sir Michael Hordern and Timothy Dalton, to perform at the theatre.

== Opera direction ==
Robertson directed several opera productions. For Scottish Opera he directed A Midsummer Night’s Dream (1972), the 1975 world premiere of Robin Orr's Hermiston, and Marriage of Figaro (1977).

== Sources ==
- Rowell, George (1993). The Old Vic Theatre: A History. Cambridge: Cambridge University Press. ISBN 9780521346252.
