= Stephen Unwin =

English theatre director

Stephen Unwin (born 29 December 1959) is an English theatre director. He is the son of Peter Unwin, a writer and British diplomat.

== Early life ==
Unwin read English at Downing College, Cambridge, where he directed many student productions, including an award-winning production of Measure for Measure that transferred to the Almeida, where he was awarded an Arts Council Trainee Director’s Bursary.

== Career ==
He has since directed over 50 professional productions and 12 operas. For much of the 1980s, he was Associate Director at the Traverse Theatre, Edinburgh, and several of his productions transferred to London theatres. He worked with a wide range of leading actors, including Simon Russell Beale, Tilda Swinton, Ken Stott, and dozens of others. In the early 1990s, he became Resident Director at the National Theatre Studio.

He launched the English Touring Theatre in June 1993, where he directed twenty productions, many of which were seen at the Old Vic, the Donmar, the Lyric Hammersmith and others. He stepped down from ETT in 2008 after fifteen years at the helm. He became the second Artistic Director (after Sir Peter Hall) of the Rose Theatre, Kingston. He has also directed in Europe and in British repertory theatre.

He was joint winner of the 2003 Sam Wanamaker Award with Barrie Rutter, and in autumn 2003 was Judith E Wilson Visiting Fellow at Cambridge University.

Unwin was Artistic Director of The Rose Theatre in Kingston, Greater London between 2008 and 2014.

In September 2010, Unwin directed Noël Coward's Hay Fever, a Rose Theatre production starring Celia Imrie, which received great critical acclaim.

He was visiting professor at the University of California and the Judith E Wilson Visiting Fellow at University of Cambridge.

== Personal life ==
He married Jenny Killick, the theatre director, on July 20 1991 in London. She was the daughter of Brigadier Edward Killick, and the sister of the actor Tim Killick, and of BBC reporter Cathy Killick.

== Books ==
- So You Want to Be a Theatre Director? By Stephen Unwin
- Faber Pocket Guide – Shakespeare
- Faber Pocket Guide – Twentieth Century Drama
- Faber Pocket Guide – Ibsen, Chekhov and Strindberg
- A Guide to the Plays of Bertolt Brecht Methuen, London. 2005. ISBN 978-0-413-77416-3
