= This Gun That I Have in My Right Hand Is Loaded =

1959 short radio drama

This Gun That I Have in My Right Hand Is Loaded is a 1959 short audio play written and produced by English author Timothy West that satirizes typical mistakes of radio drama, including over-explanatory dialogue and misuse of sound cues. It has then been used in drama schools to illustrate the pitfalls of radio writing, and The Radio Drama Handbook Richard J. Hand and Mary Traynor explained how its humour arises from gratuitous exposition and the attempt to make listeners “see” every irrelevant detail.
