= Into Paradise (All Angels album) =

Studio album by All Angels
- Released: 26 November 2007
- Genre: Classical crossover, operatic pop
- Length: --:--
- Label: Universal Classics

All Angels chronology
All Angels (2006)	Into Paradise (2007)	Fly Away (2009)

Professional ratings
Review scores
Source	Rating
Allmusic	2.5/5 stars

Into Paradise is the second album by English Classical crossover group All Angels, released in November 2007.

== Track listing ==
1. Sancte Deus (Nimrod)
2. In Paradisum
3. Make Me a Channel of Your Peace
4. Swing Low
5. The Scientist
6. The Sound of Silence
7. Lament (Band of Brothers)
8. Lift Up Your Voice (The Arrival of the Queen of Sheba)
9. Canzonetta Sull' aria
10. Pie Jesu
11. Singing You Through
12. Nothing Compares 2 U
13. Zadok the Priest
