= List of awards and nominations received by Wonder Girls =

Wonder Girls awards and nominations
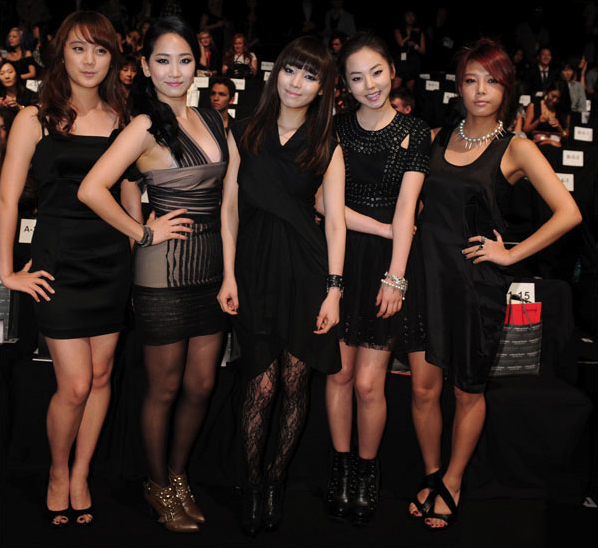
- Wonder Girls in September 2010
Awards and nominations
Award	Wins	Nominations
ASAP Pop Viewers' Choice Awards	0	1
Asia Artist Awards	0	1
Cyworld Digital Music Awards	5	5
Gaon Chart Music Awards	3	3
Golden Disc Awards	4	18
Korean Music Awards	3	7
Melon Music Awards	3	9
Mnet 20's Choice Awards	1	3
Mnet Asian Music Awards	4	15
MTV Asia Awards	0	1
Myx Music Awards	0	1
Nickelodeon Kids' Choice Awards	0	1
Popstar! Poptastic Awards	0	1
Seoul Music Awards	4	5
Shorty Awards	0	1
Singapore E-Awards	0	1
Style Icon Awards	0	1
World Music Awards	0	1
Other awards	11	11

Totals (Note: Certain award groups do not simply award one winner. They acknowledge several different recipients, have runners-up, and have third place. Since this is a specific recognition and is different from losing an award, runner-up mentions are considered wins in this award tally. For simplification and to avoid errors, each award in this list has been presumed to have had a prior nomination.)
- Wins: 49
- Nominations: 97

The following are the list of awards and nominations received by Wonder Girls, a South Korean girl group which debuted under JYP Entertainment in February 2007. They have received various awards and nominations throughout their career in South Korea and abroad, for works such as "Tell Me", "So Hot", and "Nobody".

== Awards and nominations ==
Name of award ceremony, year awarded, category, nominated work, and result
Award ceremony	Year	Category	Nominee / work	Result	Ref.
ASAP Pop Viewers' Choice Awards	2010	Pop K-Pop	Wonder Girls	Nominated	
Asia Artist Awards	2016	Most Popular Artists (Singer)	Wonder Girls	Won	
Asia Model Festival Awards	2009	Asia Star Award	Wonder Girls	Won	
Cyworld Digital Music Awards	2007	Rookie of the Month (February)	"Irony"	Won	
Cyworld Digital Music Awards	2007	Song of the Month (October)	"Tell Me"	Won	
Cyworld Digital Music Awards	2008	Song of the Month (June)	"So Hot"	Won	
Cyworld Digital Music Awards	2008	Song of the Month (September)	"Nobody"	Won	
Cyworld Digital Music Awards	2008	Song of the Month (October)	"Nobody"	Won	
Gaon Chart Music Awards	2011	Song of the Year (November)	"Be My Baby"	Won	
Gaon Chart Music Awards	2012	Song of the Year (June)	"Like This"	Won	
Gaon Chart Music Awards	2016	Song of the Year (July)	"Why So Lonely"	Won	
Golden Disc Awards	2007	Digital Song Bonsang	"Tell Me"	Won	
Golden Disc Awards	2007	Digital Daesang	"Tell Me"	Nominated	
Golden Disc Awards	2007	Popularity Award	"Tell Me"	Won	
Golden Disc Awards	2007	Rookie Artist of the Year	Wonder Girls	Won	
Golden Disc Awards	2008	Digital Song Bonsang	"Nobody"	Won	
Golden Disc Awards	2008	Digital Song Bonsang	"So Hot"	Nominated	
Golden Disc Awards	2008	Popularity Award	"So Hot"	Nominated	
Golden Disc Awards	2008	Popularity Award	"Nobody"	Nominated	
Golden Disc Awards	2010	Digital Song Bonsang	"2 Different Tears"	Nominated	
Golden Disc Awards	2010	Popularity Award	"2 Different Tears"	Nominated	
Golden Disc Awards	2010	Asia Popularity Award	Wonder Girls	Nominated	
Golden Disc Awards	2012	Album Daesang	Wonder World	Nominated	
Golden Disc Awards	2012	Album Bonsang	Wonder World	Nominated	
Golden Disc Awards	2012	Popularity Award	"Be My Baby"	Nominated	
Golden Disc Awards	2013	Digital Song Bonsang	"Like This"	Nominated	
Golden Disc Awards	2013	Popularity Award	Wonder Party	Nominated	
Golden Disc Awards	2013	MSN International Award	Wonder Party	Nominated	
Golden Disc Awards	2013	MSN Southeast Asian Award	Wonder Party	Nominated	
Korea Best Dresser Awards	2008	Best Dresser Award for Singer Category	Wonder Girls	Won	
Korea Fashion & Design Awards	2008	Style Icon of the Year	Wonder Girls	Won	
Korean Music Awards	2008	Best Dance & Electronic Song	"Tell Me"	Won	
Korean Music Awards	2008	Song of the Year	"Tell Me"	Nominated	
Korean Music Awards	2009	Song of the Year	"Nobody"	Nominated	
Korean Music Awards	2009	Best Dance & Electronic Song	"Nobody"	Nominated	
Korean Music Awards	2009	Group Musician of the Year Netizen Vote	Wonder Girls	Won	
Korean Music Awards	2016	Best Pop Album	Reboot	Nominated	
Korean Music Awards	2017	Song of the Year	"Why So Lonely"	Nominated	
Korean Music Awards	2017	Best Pop Song	"Why So Lonely"	Won	
Korean Music Arts Festival	2007	Female Photogenic Award	Wonder Girls	Won	
Korean Parliamentary Awards	2007	Daesang Award	Wonder Girls	Won	
Korean Producers & Directors Awards	2008	Best Singer Award	Wonder Girls	Won	
Ku Music Asian Music Awards	2016	Asia Best Performance Award	Wonder Girls	Won	
Melon Music Awards	2007	Best New Artist	Wonder Girls	Won	
Melon Music Awards	2007	Song of the Year	"Tell Me"	Won	
Melon Music Awards	2008	Song of the Year	"So Hot"	Won	
Melon Music Awards	2012	Top 10 Artists	Wonder Girls	Nominated	
Melon Music Awards	2012	Song of the Year	"Like This"	Nominated	
Melon Music Awards	2016	Best Female Dance	"Why So Lonely"	Nominated	
Melon Music Awards	2016	Song of the Year	"Why So Lonely"	Nominated	
Melon Music Awards	2016	Top 10 Artists	Wonder Girls	Nominated	
Melon Music Awards	2016	Netizen Popularity Award	Wonder Girls	Nominated	
Metro Radio Mandarin Hit Music Awards	2010	Asia's Most Hit Group	Wonder Girls	Won	
Miguhui Awards	2011	Top Selling Foreign Artist in Mobile Downloads	Wonder Girls	Won	
Ministry of Culture, Sports and Tourism	2009	Artist of the Year	Wonder Girls	Won	
Mnet 20's Choice Awards	2008	Hot Club Music	"So Hot"	Won	
Mnet 20's Choice Awards	2008	Hot Online Song	"So Hot"	Nominated	
Mnet 20's Choice Awards	2010	20's Most Influential Stars	Wonder Girls	Nominated	
Mnet Asian Music Awards	2007	Best New Female Group	Wonder Girls	Won	
Mnet Asian Music Awards	2007	Artist of the Year	Wonder Girls	Nominated	
Mnet Asian Music Awards	2007	Album of the Year	The Wonder Years	Nominated	
Mnet Asian Music Awards	2008	Best Female Group	Wonder Girls	Won	
Mnet Asian Music Awards	2008	Artist of the Year	Wonder Girls	Nominated	
Mnet Asian Music Awards	2008	Song of the Year	"Nobody"	Won	
Mnet Asian Music Awards	2008	Best Dance Performance	"Nobody"	Nominated	
Mnet Asian Music Awards	2008	Best Music Video	"Nobody"	Won	
Mnet Asian Music Awards	2012	Best Global Group (Female)	Wonder Girls	Nominated	
Mnet Asian Music Awards	2015	Best Female Group	Wonder Girls	Nominated	
Mnet Asian Music Awards	2015	Best Music Video	"I Feel You"	Nominated	
Mnet Asian Music Awards	2016	Best Female Group	Wonder Girls	Nominated	
Mnet Asian Music Awards	2016	Artist of the Year	Wonder Girls	Nominated	
Mnet Asian Music Awards	2016	iQIYI Worldwide Favourite Artist	Wonder Girls	Nominated	
Mnet Asian Music Awards	2016	Best Music Video	"Why So Lonely"	Nominated	
MTV Asia Awards	2008	Favorite Korean Artist	Wonder Girls	Nominated	
MTV Style Gala	2009	Most Stylish Asian Artist of the Year	Wonder Girls	Won	
Myx Music Awards	2010	Favorite International Video	"Nobody"	Nominated	
National Assembly Pop Culture & Media Awards	2007	Pop Music Award	Wonder Girls	Won	
Nickelodeon Kids' Choice Awards	2012	Favourite Asian Act	Wonder Girls	Nominated	
Nickelodeon Korea Kids' Choice Awards	2008	Best Female Singer	Wonder Girls	Won	
Philippine K-pop Awards	2009	Song of the Year	"Nobody"	Won	
Popstar! Poptastic Awards	2012	Best TV Movie	The Wonder Girls	Nominated	
RTHK International Pop Poll Awards	2011	Top Ten International Gold Songs	"Nobody"	Won	
RTHK International Pop Poll Awards	2011	Top Group / Band	Wonder Girls	Gold	
Seoul Music Awards	2007	Best New Artist	Wonder Girls	Won	
Seoul Music Awards	2009	Best Song Award	"Nobody"	Won	
Seoul Music Awards	2009	Bonsang Award	"Nobody"	Won	
Seoul Music Awards	2009	Daesang Award	The Wonder Years: Trilogy	Won	
Seoul Music Awards	2012	Bonsang Award	"Like This"	Nominated	
Singapore E-Awards	2012	Most Popular Korean Artist	Wonder Girls	Nominated	
Shorty Awards	2012	Best Singer in Social Media	Wonder Girls	Nominated	
Sports Korea Awards	2007	Star of the Year	Wonder Girls	Won	
Sports Korea Awards	2007	Singer of the Year	Wonder Girls	Won	
Sports Korea Awards	2007	Song of the Year	"Tell Me"	Won	
Sports Korea Awards	2008	Song of the Year	"Nobody"	Won	
Style Icon Awards	2010	Popularity Award	Wonder Girls	Nominated	
World Music Awards	2012	World's Best Group	Wonder Girls	Nominated	
Yahoo! Asia Buzz Awards	2010	Asia's Most Appealing Korean Female Artist	Wonder Girls	Won	

== Listicles ==
Name of publisher, year listed, name of listicle, and placement
Publisher	Year	Listicle	Ranking	Ref.
Billboard	2017	10 Best K-Pop Girl Groups of the Past Decade	3rd	
The Dong-a Ilbo	2016	Best Female Artists According to Experts	2nd	
Forbes	2009	Korea Power Celebrity 40	3rd	
Idolator	2018	The Greatest Girl Groups Of All Time	Placed	
IZM	2025	The 25 Greatest Musicians of the first 25 Years of the 21st Century	Placed	
LiveAbout	2018	Top 20 Girl Groups of All Time	Placed	
Teen Vogue	2024	21 Best Girl Groups of All Time	Placed	
Us Weekly	2022	Best Girl Groups of All Time	Placed	

Awards and achievements
Preceded by Incumbent	Korean Music Awards: Group Musician of the Year; 2009	Succeeded by Girls' Generation
Preceded by Big Bang	Seoul Gayo Daesang Award for Daesang; 2009	Succeeded by Girls' Generation
Preceded by Big Bang with Lies	M.NET KM Music Festival - Song of the Year (Daesang); 2008, with Nobody	Succeeded by 2NE1 with I Don't Care
Preceded by SeeYa	M.NET KM Music Festival - Best Female Group; 2008	Succeeded by Brown Eyed Girls
Preceded by Zhang Liyin	M.NET KM Music Festival - Best New Female Group/Artist; 2007	Succeeded by Davichi
