= Nobody for Everybody =

- Standard edition cover

EP by Wonder Girls
- Released: July 25, 2012
- Recorded: 2012
- Genre: J-pop
- Length: 21:36
- Language: Japanese; Korean; English; Mandarin
- Label: DefStar
- Producer: Rainstone; Ho Yoon Moon "Moonworker"; Juh Soo Nuh; Brian Stanley; Brian Gardner; Sin Eun Ji; Sin Seog Cheol; Sin Hyeon Gwon; Gil Eun Gyeong; Lyu Yeong Min; K String; Hong Ji-sang

Wonder Girls chronology
Wonder Party (2012)	Nobody for Everybody (2012)	Wonder Best (2012)

Nobody for Everybody is the Japanese debut EP by South Korean girl group Wonder Girls. Its title song is "Nobody" ～あなたしか見えない～ (ノーバディ, Nōbadi), first released on their third Korean mini-album, The Wonder Years: Trilogy in 2008. This is the fourth language that "Nobody" has been released in; the song was first released in Korean and was followed by English and Chinese versions.

The EP consists of the Japanese version of "Nobody" as well as 2012 re-recordings of "Nobody" (in both Korean and English), "Saying I Love You", and "You're Out". These 2012 recordings include vocals of member Hyerim who entered the group in 2010, replacing the group's original member Sunmi. It sold 10,731 copies in Japan according to Oricon.

== Background ==
After announcing the Wonder Girls as spokesmodels for the brand "Marshpuff" in Japan, JYPE requested that their Japanese record label, DefStar Records, listen to the Wonder Girls' released albums and singles before deciding on what song would be their debut in the country. The label had strong mutual interest in "Nobody", so it was chosen as the title song for their first Japanese album.

In May 2012, the Wonder Girls officially announced their debut into the Japanese market with a Japanese version of "Nobody", "Nobody ～あなたしか見えない～". JYP JYPE stated: "Wonder Girls have received numerous inquiries from Japan and [are] observing their advertisement and music business flourishing even without their official introduction." The EP was released on July 25, 2012 in three different physical variants.

== Track listing ==
Nobody for Everybody – Standard edition
No.	Title	Writer(s)	Producer(s)	Length
1.	"Nobody" (Japanese version) (Nobody ～あなたしか見えない～; Nobody Anatashika Mie Nai)		Park Jin-young; Rainstone	3:34
2.	"Nobody" (2012 Korean version) (featuring background vocals by J.Y. Park "The Asiansoul")	Park	Park; Rainstone	3:34
3.	"Nobody" (2012 English version) (featuring background vocals by J.Y. Park "The Asiansoul")	Park	Park; Rainstone; Ho Yoon Moon "Moonworker"; Jun Soo Nuh; Brian Stanley; Brian Gardner	3:34
4.	"Be My Baby"	Park	Park	3:31
5.	"Saying I Love You" (2012 version)	Park Yeeun	Yeeun; Sin Eun Ji; Sin Seog Cheol; Sin Hyeon Gwon; Gil Eun Gyeong; Lyu Yeong Min; K String	3:55
6.	"You’re Out" (2012 version) (ボーナストラック; bonus track)	Park; Hong Ji-sang	Park; Hong	3:11

Nobody for Everybody – Special deluxe edition A (bonus DVD)
No.	Title	Length
1.	"Nobody" (昨年夏の〈JYP Nation Japan 2011〉のライヴ映像を収録; Live Performance from JYP Nation 2011)
2.	"Tell Me" (昨年夏の〈JYP Nation Japan 2011〉のライヴ映像を収録; Live Performance from JYP Nation 2011)

Nobody for Everybody – Special deluxe edition B (bonus DVD)
No.	Title	Length
1.	"Nobody" (Japanese version) (music video)

== Charts ==
Chart (2012)	Peak position
Japanese Albums (Oricon)	14
