= No One =

No One may refer to:

== Music ==
- No One (band)
- No One (album), the sole studio album by the band of the same name

=== Songs ===
- "No One" (Connie Francis song), 1964, also covered by Ray Charles and Brenda Lee
- "No One" (2 Unlimited song), 1994
- "No One" (Alicia Keys song), 2007
- "No One" (Aly & AJ song), 2005
- "No One (Can Ever Change My Mind)", by Stefanie Heinzmann, 2009
- "No One" (Maja Keuc song), 2010
- "No One" (Maverick Sabre song), 2012
- "No One", by Cold from their album 13 Ways to Bleed on Stage
- "No-One", by Dark Tranquillity from their album Projector
- "No One", by Fear Factory from their album Digimortal
- "No One", by Jess Glynne from her album Always In Between
- "Song for No One", by Alphaville
- "Song for No One", by Shawn Mendes from his album Wonder

== Film and television ==
- No One (2005 film), a documentary film by Tin Dirdamal
- No-One (2018 film), an Israeli-Ukrainian film
- "No One" (Game of Thrones)

== Other uses ==
- No one, no-one or noone, an English indefinite pronoun
- Outis, often used as a pseudonym
- No/One (comics), a 2023 comic book limited series set in the Massive-Verse published by Image Comics
- No One (ISP), a British internet service provider

== See also ==
- Noone, a surname
- Noone language, a language of Cameroon
- No One Knows (disambiguation)
- Nobody (disambiguation)
- No (disambiguation)
- One (disambiguation)
