= No One Knows (Stephy Tang song) =

Single by Stephy Tang 邓丽欣

from the album No One Knows
- Language: Cantonese
- Released: July 16, 2010
- Genre: Pop; Cantopop
- Length: 3:23
- Label: Gold Typhoon
- Songwriter(s): Roxanne Seeman; Kine Ludvigsen-Fossheim; Olav Fossheim; Cantonese lyrics Yan Kin Keung

Music video
- "No One Knows" on YouTube

"No One Knows" is a song by Hong Kong actress and Cantopop singer Stephy Tang, written by Roxanne Seeman, Kine Ludvigsen-Fossheim, and Olav Fossheim, with Cantonese lyrics by Yan Kin Keung. It was the title song and first single from her No One Knows EP released by Gold Typhoon on July 16, 2010. It was also the title song of a second EP, No One Knows (Stephy x Y.E.S.- 3D感官版), recorded in Mandarin and released by Gold Typhoon in 2011.

== Composition and lyrics ==
"No One Knows" is an uptempo dance-pop song with disco influences. The song was written by Norwegian singer Kine Fossheim-Ludvigsen, Swedish producer Olav Fossheim, and American songwriter Roxanne Seeman, the writers of Jacky Cheung’s song Double Trouble. The lyrics were adapted into Cantonese by Yan Kin Keung, keeping the English title.

== Music video ==
An accompanying video was released. TVB broadcast the MV of the golden song. The singers included Lin Feng, Liang Yongqi, Stephy Tang, among others.

== Summer Love Love (戀夏戀夏戀戀下) ==
"No One Knows" was performed by Terence Siufay on the soundtrack of Hong Kong film Summer Love Love (戀夏戀夏戀戀下), released August 25, 2011. Summer Love Love is a romantic comedy directed by Wilson Chin, starring Lik-Sun Fong, Stephy Tang, Elanne Kwong, Terence Chui, J.J. Jia, Ekin Cheng, Eric Tsang and others.
