= Nobody =

Nobody most often refers to:

- Nobody, an indefinite pronoun

Nobody may also refer to:

== Fictional characters ==
- Nobody (Kingdom Hearts), a race of beings in the Kingdom Hearts video game series
- Nobody (Devil May Cry), a demon appearing in Devil May Cry
- Nobody, a character in the Jim Jarmusch films Dead Man and Ghost Dog: The Way of the Samurai
- Nobody, a character in the 1973 Italian film My Name Is Nobody
- Nobody, a character in the Teenage Mutant Ninja Turtles franchise
- Odysseus, who used the name "nobody" in his battle against Polyphemus

== Film and television ==
- Nobody (1921 film), an American silent film
- "The Nobody" (The Amazing World of Gumball), a 2015 TV episode
- "Nobody" (Folklore), a 2018 TV episode
- Nobody (2021 film), American thriller film
  - Nobody 2 (2025 film), American thriller sequel film
- Nobody (2025 film), Chinese animated film

== Music ==
- Nobody (producer) (born 1977), American record producer

=== Albums ===
- Nobody (album) or the title song, by Chief Keef, 2014
- Nobody (EP) or the title song, by Cartman, 2000
- Nobody, mixtape by twlv, 2018

=== Songs ===
- "No Body", by Blake Shelton, 2022
- "Nobody" (1905 song), by Alex Rogers and Bert A. Williams
- "Nobody" (Avenged Sevenfold song), 2023
- "Nobody" (DJ Neptune song), 2020
- "Nobody" (DJ Quik song), 2011
- "Nobody" (The Doobie Brothers song), 1971
- "Nobody" (Dylan Scott song), 2020
- "Nobody" (James Cottriall song), 2014
- "Nobody" (Keith Sweat song), 1996
- "Nobody" (Martin Jensen and James Arthur song), 2019
- "Nobody" (Mitski song), 2018
- "Nobody" (OneRepublic song), 2024
- "Nobody" (Rick Ross song), 2014
- "Nobody" (Shara Nelson song), 1994
- "Nobody" (Skindred song), 2002
- "Nobody" (Sylvia song), 1982
- "Nobody" (Toni Basil song), 1981
- "Nobody" (Wonder Girls song), 2008
- "Nobody", by Ariana Grande and Chaka Khan from Charlie's Angels: Original Motion Picture Soundtrack, 2019
- "Nobody", by Craig's Brother from Homecoming, 1998
- "Nobody", by DJ Khaled from Grateful, 2017
- "Nobody", by Eliza Doolittle from Eliza Doolittle, 2010
- "Nobody", by Emmylou Harris from Hard Bargain, 2011
- "Nobody", by Five for Fighting from The Battle for Everything, 2003
- "Nobody", by Gorgon City, 2020
- "Nobody", by Hozier from Wasteland, Baby!, 2019
- "Nobody", by Inna, 2020
- "Nobody", by Jhené Aiko from Trip, 2017
- "Nobody", by Keyakizaka46 from Kuroi Hitsuji, 2019
- "Nobody", by King Gizzard & the Lizard Wizard from Changes, 2023
- "Nobody", by Mac DeMarco from Here Comes the Cowboy, 2019
- "Nobody", by Ne-Yo from Year of the Gentleman, 2008
- "Nobody", by PartyNextDoor from PartyNextDoor 3, 2016
- "Nobody", by Selena Gomez from Revival, 2015
- "Nobody", by Silver Sun from Silver Sun, 1997
- "Nobody", by Swans from Greed, 1986
- "Nobody", by Todrick Hall from Forbidden, 2018
- "Nobody", by Wizkid from Sounds from the Other Side, 2017

== People ==
- John Eales (born 1970), former Australian rugby union captain, nicknamed "Nobody" (because "Nobody's perfect")
- Adam Nobody, demonstrator beaten by police at the 2010 G-20 Toronto summit protests
- James Robertson (orientalist) (1714–1795), author of Poems : consisting of tales, fables, epigrams, &c. &c. "by Nobody" (1770)
- Nobody, formerly Rich Paul, write-in candidate in the 2020 New Hampshire gubernatorial election

== Other uses ==
- The Nobody, a 2009 graphic novel by Jeff Lemire
- Outis, Ancient Greek for "nobody", an often used pseudonym
- nobody (username), the name of a Unix account which has no particular privileges
- Nobody for President, a parodic campaign for the presidency of the United States of America

== See also ==
- Nobodies (disambiguation)
- No One (disambiguation)
- Mr. Nobody (disambiguation)
