= No One Knows (disambiguation) =

"No One Knows" is a song by Queens of the Stone Age.

No One Knows may also refer to:

- No One Knows (EP), by Stephy Tang, 2011
  - "No One Knows" (Stephy Tang song), the title song, 2010
- "No One Knows" (Dion and The Belmonts song), 1958
- "No One Knows", a song by Aṣa from Aṣa
- "No One Knows", a song by Dexter Freebish
- "No One Knows", a song by Green Day from Kerplunk!
- "No One Knows", a song by Screaming Trees from Sweet Oblivion
- "No One Knows", a song by Stephen Sanchez from Angel Face.

== See also ==
- Nobody Knows (disambiguation)
- What No One Knows, a 2008 Danish film
