= Rainstone =

- Born: Rhee Woo Seok
- Origin: South Korea
- Genres: K-pop
- Occupations: Music producer, songwriter, record executive
- Label: JYP Entertainment

Korean name
- Hangul: 이우석
- RR: I Useok
- MR: I Usŏk

Rhee Woo Seok (Korean: 이우석), also credited as Rainstone, is a South Korean music producer, songwriter, and vice-president of JYP Entertainment in the United States. He is best known for composing and producing the Wonder Girls' 2009 international hit song, "Nobody."

== Biography ==
From an early age, Woo S. Rhee/RAINSTONE had an ear for music as well as hitting number one. He was classically trained in piano, violin, and viola and in high school, he expanded his wings and started a Rock Band called "Feel." In 1993, as a junior in High School, Woo S. Rhee/RAINSTONE and his band mates entered a college only rock festival, Korean Rock Group Festival and won first place. Although, there were many issues regarding their win because of their age, Woo S. Rhee/RAINSTONE and his band proved that talent is more important than experience.

But as Woo S. Rhee/RAINSTONE started to mature as a musician, he started to embrace Jazz and began taking private classes behind his band mates. This opened his eyes and ears to a new world of music as well as coming across Stevie Wonder and discovering urban music. He realized with his new burning passion, Korea was very limited and decided to study in America.

In 1999, he received his Bachelor's from Berklee College of Music majoring in Professional Music, concentrating on composition and arrangements. After his undergrad, he received his Masters in Media writing and Production from University of Miami in 2003.

=== Music career ===
Upon completion of his master's degree in music engineering in 2003, Woo S. Rhee/RAINSTONE took his talents to New York City, where he met international music producer extraordinaire Park Jin-Young also known as J.Y. Park.

The duo collaborated in extensive pieces, producing and co-producing for artists including G.O.D and Rain. They are most recognized from the success of Wonder Girls "Tell Me" and "Nobody".

"Tell Me" was the lead single from the Wonder Girls' first full-length album, The Wonder Years, which was created in Woo S. Rhee/RAINSTONE's basement studio in Jersey with J.Y. Park. It immediately hit #1 on various charts and received #1 on KBS's music TV series, staying at that position for 7 consecutive weeks. The song received a triple crown at SBS Inkigayo and won Cyworld Digital Music Awards: Song of the Month (October) ("Tell Me")[5] and 5th Korean Music Awards: Best Dance & Electronic Song Award ("Tell Me")[6]. "Tell Me" is notable for its choreography, which was widely imitated and featured on various online video sites.[1] This phenomenon started the 'Girl Group Syndrome,' being the first movement for Girl Groups in the K-POP Scene. In 2013, Online Research Panel Korea ran a survey from June 26 to the 30th asking voters to pick the song they felt is the best idol song. After 21,955 votes were counted, Wonder Girls' "Tell Me" topped the list with 27% (5866 votes).

Their second major hit, "Nobody", sold 4,648,973 digital downloads in South Korea alone, Most YouTube video viewed in 2011, and the first Asian song #1 in 8 Different Asian Countries. At the 2008 MNet KM Music Festival Awards, the Wonder Girls received three awards: the "Song of the Year" award, "Best Music Video" for "Nobody" and "Best Female Group".[20] The group also won an award at the 2008 Golden Disk Awards a month later for high digital sales.[21] At the 18th Seoul Music Awards, the Wonder Girls won the Daesang ("Artist of the Year" award), the highest award offered, for "Nobody", and two other awards.[22]

Singles like "Tell Me" and "Nobody" cemented Woo S. Rhee/RAINSTONE's reputation in Asia as a sought after talent in the cache of JYP Entertainment's music production team.

In 2012, Woo S. Rhee/RAINSTONE produced Wonder Girls "Like money" featuring superstar Akon and collaborating with Samsung in their music video. This was the first official U.S Single and in its first week of release the song debuted at number 11 in South Korea with 161,542 downloads. By the end of August 2012 the song was downloaded 583,737 times in South Korea alone, making the song one of the best-selling English-language songs of the year in Korea and as well as ranking #46 on top charts.

Woo S. Rhee/RAINSTONE also had a chance to work with his beloved mentor Stevie Wonder and produced Wonder Girls "Wonder Love" released in Japan.

Not only has Woo S. Rhee/RAINSTONE generated non-stop hits for the Wonder Girls but also took major parts in the careers of all his JYP Artist such as Rain, 2PM, 2AM, Miss A, and 15& and much more. For example, 2PM's "Heartbeat" was released as the lead single for The First Album 01:59PM peaking at No. 1 on the Gaon Chart.

Currently, Woo S. Rhee/RAINSTONE collaborated with China's biggest game and IT company QQ Games with 2PM. He produced 2PM's game theme song "Shining in the Night," official launch date on 4/18/13 in Beijing

=== Business career ===
With Woo Rhee's new sound and business acumen, and JY Park's dynamic company backing them up, they formed JYP Entertainment USA in 2007, an offshoot of the larger company in Korea, JYP Entertainment.

Beyond music production, Woo Rhee and JY Park have worked on creating brand exposure, including designing, creating, and branding the Diamond Tears headphones. The headphones are a joint venture between Monster and JYP USA.

Woo Rhee is also invited to 2013 Dubai International Awards in November as a representative of Asia.

== Production credits ==
Year	Artist	Song	Album	Lyrics		Music		Arrangement	
Year	Artist	Song	Album	Credited	With	Credited	With	Credited	With
2002	J.ae	"What You Gonna Do?" (그럴 수 있니)	Dim the Lights	No	—N/a	Yes	Kim Sin-il	Yes	Kim Sin-il
2005	G.o.d (feat. J.Y. Park)	"Two Doors" (두개의 문)	Into the Sky	No	—N/a	Yes	J.Y. Park	Yes	—N/a
2006	Rain	"Not A Single Day" (하루도)	Rain's World	No	—N/a	Yes	J.Y. Park	Yes	J.Y. Park
2007	Wonder Girls	"I Wanna"	The Wonder Years	No	—N/a	No	—N/a	Yes	J.Y. Park
2007	Wonder Girls	"Tell Me"	The Wonder Years	No	—N/a	No	—N/a	Yes	J.Y. Park, John Mitchell
2008	Wonder Girls (feat. Dynamic Duo, San E, J.Y. Park)	"Anybody"	Non-album single	No	—N/a	Yes	J.Y. Park	Yes	—N/a
2008	Wonder Girls	"Intro"	The Wonder Years: Trilogy	No	—N/a	Yes	J.Y. Park	No	—N/a
2008	Wonder Girls	"Nobody"	The Wonder Years: Trilogy	No	—N/a	Yes	J.Y. Park	Yes	—N/a
2008	2PM	"10 Out of 10"	01:59PM	No	—N/a	No	—N/a	Yes	J.Y. Park
2009	2PM	"Heartbeat"	01:59PM	No	—N/a	No	—N/a	Yes	J.Y. Park
2009	J.Y. Park	"Come Over"	Sad Freedom	Yes	J.Y. Park	Yes	J.Y. Park	Yes	J.Y. Park
2009	J.Y. Park	"No Love No More"	Sad Freedom	No	—N/a	No	—N/a	Yes	J.Y. Park
2010	Wonder Girls	"2 Different Tears"	2 Different Tears	No	—N/a	No	—N/a	Yes	J.Y. Park
2010	Nine Muses	"No Playboy"	Let's Have a Party	No	—N/a	Yes	J.Y. Park	Yes	J.Y. Park
2011	Wonder Girls	"Be My Baby"	Wonder World	No	—N/a	Yes	J.Y. Park	Yes	Fingazz
2011	Wonder Girls	"Nu Shoes"	Wonder World	Yes	Alexander Kronlund, Lukas Hilbert	Yes	Alexander Kronlund, Lukas Hilbert	No	—N/a
2011	Wonder Girls	"Long Long Time" (두고두고)	Wonder World	No	—N/a	No	—N/a	Yes	J.Y. Park
2012	Wonder Girls (feat. School Gyrls)	"The DJ Is Mine"	Wonder Party	Yes	Crystal Nicole	Yes	Crystal Nicole, Christian Buettner, Marcello Pagin	No	—N/a
2012	Wonder Girls (feat. Akon)	"Like Money"	Wonder Best	Yes	Alexander Kronlund, Lukas Hilbert, Crystal Nicole	Yes	Alexander Kronlund, Lukas Hilbert, Crystal Nicole	No	—N/a
2012	Wonder Girls	"Wonder Love"	Wonder Best	Yes	Fredrik Odesjo, Yummy Bingham, Mounia Tajiou, Lucius C. Page III	Yes	Fredrik Odesjo, Yummy Bingham, Mounia Tajiou, Lucius C. Page III	No	—N/a
2014	Rainstone, Brian McKnight, San E, Verbal Jint	"Rainstorm by Rainstone"	Non-album single	Yes	Brian McKnight, San E, Verbal Jint, Fingazz	Yes	Fingazz	No	—N/a
2016	24K	"Still 24K"	The Real One	Yes	Jeonguk, Kim In-a	Yes	Cory, Patrick Lukens, Sebastian Kole	Yes	Cory, Patrick Lukens
2017	Gill, Ltak	"Got U"	The Guardians OST	No	—N/a	Yes	Gill, R.M. Tedder	No	—N/a
2021	Twice	"Doughnut"	Celebrate	No	—N/a	Yes	—N/a	Yes	—N/a

Source: Korea Music Copyright Association, ID: W0438700.
