= Nobodies =

Nobodies may refer to:

- The Nobodys (band), a Californian band
- The Nobodies (film), a 2016 film
- The Nobodies (novel), a 2005 fantasy novel by N. E. Bode
- The Nobodies (song), a song from Marilyn Manson's 2000 album Holy Wood (In the Shadow of the Valley of Death)
- Nobodies (TV series), an American comedy television series

== See also ==
- Nobody (disambiguation)
