= Summer Love Love =

2011 Hong Kong-Chinese romantic comedy film

- Film poster
- Traditional Chinese: 夏日戀神馬
- Simplified Chinese: 夏日恋神马
- Hanyu Pinyin: Xiàrì Liàn Shénmǎ
- Directed by: Wilson Kwok-wai Chin
- Written by: He Xin
- Produced by: Chen Chaoji; Chen Kewu
- Starring: Alex Fong; Owodog; Viann Zhang; Carol Yeung; Terence Siufay; Elanne Kong
- Cinematography: Chen Chuqiang
- Edited by: Huang Hai
- Music by: Ronald Ng; Yu Jialu
- Production companies: Lingdong Entertainment Co., Ltd.
- Distributed by: Guangdong Xinhua Zhanwang Media Co., Ltd.
- Release dates: 23 August 2011 (Hong Kong); 4 November 2011 (China)
- Running time: 98 minutes
- Countries: Hong Kong; China
- Languages: Mandarin; Cantonese

Summer Love Love (Chinese: 夏日恋神马 or Chinese: 戀夏戀夏戀戀下) is a 2011 romantic comedy film directed by Wilson Kwok-wai Chin and starring Alex Fong, Owodog, Terence Siufay, Elanne Kong, Viann Zhang, Izumi Liu, and Carol Yeung. A Hong Kong-Chinese co-production, the film was released on 23 August 2011.

== Cast ==
- Alex Fong as Xiao Fangfang
- Owodog as Nuannuan
- Viann Zhang as Xiaoyu
- Carol Yeung as Carol
- Terence Siufay as Xiaofei
- Elanne Kong as Xiaolin.
- Izumi Liu as Qiqi.

== Production ==
This film was shot in Sanya, Hainan, China.
