= Noone =

Noone is a surname. Notable people with the surname include:

- Craig Noone (born 1987), English football midfielder
- Eímear Noone, Irish conductor and composer
- Garron Noone (born 1994), Irish TikTok star, musician, comedian and spokesman
- Jimmie Noone (1895–1944), American jazz clarinetist
- John Noone (1936–2025), British writer
- Kathleen Noone (born 1945), American soap opera/television actress
- Nora Jane Noone (born 1984), Irish film and television actress
- Paul Noone (born 1981), English rugby league player
- Peter Noone (born 1947), English musician
- Val Noone (born 1940), Australian author, social activist, academic, historian

== See also ==
- Noone language, a language of Cameroon
- No one
- Noon
