= A Single Rider =

- Theatrical release poster
- Directed by: Lee Joo-young
- Written by: Lee Joo-young
- Produced by: Kang Myung-chan
- Starring: Lee Byung-hun; Gong Hyo-jin; Ahn So-hee
- Cinematography: Il-Yeon Kim
- Edited by: Kim Sang-bum; Kim Jae-bum
- Music by: Jo Yeong-wook
- Production companies: Perfect Storm Films; BH Entertainment
- Distributed by: Warner Bros. Pictures
- Release date: February 22, 2017
- Running time: 97 minutes
- Country: South Korea
- Languages: Korean; English
- Box office: US$2.4 million

A Single Rider (Korean: 싱글라이더; RR: Singgeullaideo) is a 2017 South Korean drama film starring Lee Byung-hun and Gong Hyo-jin. The film released on February 22, 2017. Co-produced and distributed by Warner Bros. Pictures, the film is the directorial debut of Lee Joo-young.

== Plot ==
Promising fund manager Kang Jae-hoon is at the brink of despair when his company goes bankrupt. He decides to take an impulsive trip to Australia to visit his wife, Soo-jin, and their son Jin-woo. Upon arriving, Jae-hoon sees them living happily without him and starts suspecting Soo-jin's affectionate relationship with her neighbor, Kris. Taken aback by the situation, Jae-hoon decides to watch them from a distance, only to confront a shocking truth that goes against what he stands for.

== Cast ==
- Lee Byung-hun as Kang Jae-hoon
- Gong Hyo-jin as Lee Soo-jin
- Ahn So-hee as Ji-na / Yoo Jin-ah
- Jack Campbell as Kris
- Yang Yoo-jin as Kang Jin-woo
- Annika Whiteley as Lucy
- Kei Ekland as Grandmother
- Baek Soo-jang as In-ho
- Choi Joon-young as Javi
- Lee Seung-ha as Amy
- Leeanna Walsman as Stella
- Benedict Hardie as Mr. Harbour
- Kim Hak-sun as Managing Director
- James Wright as Central Station Staff
- John Harding as Australian Policeman
- Dylan Hayes as Australian Policeman
- Celia Kelly as Nurse
- Lea Riley as Audition Staff
- Keith Thomas as Audition Judge Man
- Andrew Doyle as Audition Judge Man

== Awards and nominations ==
Year	Award	Category	Recipient	Result
2017	53rd Baeksang Arts Awards	Best New Director	Lee Joo-young	Nominated
2017	13th JIMFF Awards	JIMFF Star Award	Ahn So-hee	Won
2017	26th Buil Film Awards	Best New Director	Lee Joo-young	Nominated
2017	54th Grand Bell Awards	Best Music	A Single Rider	Nominated
2017	38th Blue Dragon Film Awards	Best New Director	Lee Joo-young	Nominated
2017	38th Blue Dragon Film Awards	Best Screenplay	Lee Joo-young	Nominated
2017	38th Blue Dragon Film Awards	Best Music	A Single Rider	Nominated
