= The Wonder Years (Wonder Girls album) =

Studio album by Wonder Girls
- Released: September 13, 2007
- Recorded: 2006–2007
- Genre: K-pop; R&B; dance-pop; electropop; synthpop
- Length: 46:46
- Label: JYP; LOEN; GMM Grammy; KMP
- Producer: Hitman Bang; Jang Jun-ho; Brian Kim; Lee Min Woo; Lyu Hyeong-seom; Mitchell John Dixon; Park Jin-young; Rainstone; SoulAttack; Seo Ui-beom

Wonder Girls chronology
The Wonder Begins (2007)	The Wonder Years (2007)	So Hot (2008)

Singles from The Wonder Years
- 1. "Tell Me" Released: September 13, 2007; 2. "This Fool" Released: December 10, 2007

The Wonder Years is the debut studio album by South Korean girl group Wonder Girls. It was released on September 13, 2007, by JYP Entertainment. The album produced two singles, "Tell Me" and "This Fool". "Tell Me" was a commercial success in South Korea, topping various musical charts.

Original member Hyuna left the group two months before the album was released and was replaced by Yubin. Because of this, Hyuna's vocals are still featured on certain songs on the album. The Wonder Years also includes songs first featured on their debut record The Wonder Begins, which was released earlier that year.

== Background ==
Wonder Girls were formed in 2006 by Park Jin-young as part of the television reality show MTV Wonder Girls (2006–2010), during which they held their first performances, rehearsals, and recording sessions. The group released their successful debut single "Irony" in February 2007. The same month, their debut EP The Wonder Begins was released which featured the follow-up singles "Bad Boy" and "It's Not Love". In July 2007, the original group member Hyuna left the group due to health problems and was replaced by rapper Yubin.

== Release and promotion ==
The Wonder Years was physically released in South Korea through JYP Entertainment and LOEN Entertainment on September 13, 2007. The same day, the album was released for digital download worldwide and on US iTunes Store through JYP Entertainment. It was also physically released in Thailand through recording label G"MM' Grammy. The album was promoted with various live performances, including a guest-performance at the 2007 spring festival of the Hanyang University. The Wonder Girls embarked on their first Asian tour in 2009 before their world tour the following year.

== Singles ==
"Tell Me" was released as the main single from the album and became the group's first number one hit. Due to the last-minute addition of rapper Yubin to the group, her rap is not on the album version, and a version titled "Tell Me (Rap Version)" was made to include Yubin's vocals. This version was included as a B-side on the group's maxi-single So Hot (2008).

The second single from the album was "This Fool (이 바보)", which debuted on MBC's show Music Core on December 10, 2007. This song was used to promote the South Korean film Hellcats which features Wonder Girls member Ahn Sohee. Though not released as a single, a music video was produced for the song "Wishing on a Star".

== Track listing ==
All lyrics and music are written and composed by Park Jin-young, unless otherwise noted.

The Wonder Years – Standard edition
No.	Title	Writer(s)	Producer(s)	Length
1.	"I Wanna"		Park Jin-young; Rainstone	3:46
2.	"This Fool" (이바보; Ibabo)			3:48
3.	"Tell Me"	Park Jin-young; Mitchell Dixon	Park Jin-young; Mitchell John Dixon; Rainstone	3:37
4.	"Friend"	Tae Kwon; Seo Ui-beom	SoulAttack; Ui-beom	4:00
5.	"Headache"	Tae Kwon	SoulAttack; Jang Jun-ho	3:31
6.	"So What" (뭐 어때; Mwo Eottae (featuring David Kim))	Brian Kim	Brian Kim	4:04
7.	"Wishing on a Star"	Bag Chae-won	Lyu Hyeong-seob	3:57
8.	"Move" (featuring Lee Min-woo)	Lee Min-woo	Lee Min-woo	3:30
9.	"Take It" (가져가; Gajyeoga)		Park Jin-young; SoulAttack	3:46
10.	"Good Bye"			3:32
11.	"Bad Boy"		Park Jin-young; Hitman Bang	3:11
12.	"It's Not Love" (미안한 마음 ~tears~; Mianhan Ma-eum ~tears~)		Park Jin-young; SoulAttack	4:00
13.	"Irony"			4:04
Total length:				46:46

=== Notes ===
- "Tell Me" samples the song "Two of Hearts" by Stacey Q.

== Personnel ==
- Min Sunye – vocals (all tracks)
- Park Ye-eun – vocals (all tracks)
- Ahn Sohee – vocals (all tracks)
- Lee Sunmi – vocals (all tracks)
- Kim Yubin – vocals (tracks 1–10)
- Kim Hyuna – vocals (11,12,13), background vocals (tracks 2, 3, 4, 6, 8, 9, 12, 13)
- Park Jin-young – songwriting, production (tracks 1, 2, 3, 9, 10, 11, 12, 13), background vocals (track 3)
- Woo Seok Rhee – production (tracks 1, 3)
- Won Hyeon Jeong – background vocals (tracks 2, 13)
- Mitchell John Dixon – songwriting, production (track 3)
- Tae Kwon – songwriting, production (tracks 4, 5, 9, 12)
- Seo Ui Beom – songwriting, production (track 4)
- Jang Jun Ho – production (track 5)
- Brian Kim – featured artist, songwriting, production (track 6)
- Bag Chae Won – songwriting (track 7)
- Lyu Hyeong Seob – production (track 7)
- Lin Jeong Yeon – background vocals (track 7)
- Lee Min Woo – featured artist, songwriting, production (track 8)
- Bang Si-hyuk – production (track 11)

== Charts ==
=== Monthly charts ===
Chart (2008)	Peak position
South Korean Albums (MIAK)	4

=== Yearly charts ===
Chart (2007)	Position
South Korean Albums (MIAK)	15

== Release history ==
Region	Date	Edition	Format	Label	Catalog	Ref.
Worldwide	September 13, 2007	Standard	Digital download	JYP	—N/a	
South Korea	September 13, 2007	Standard	CD	JYP; LOEN	SDL-0025	
Thailand	September 13, 2007	Standard	CD	G"MM' Grammy	AVCD172	
South Korea	April 23, 2012	Reissue	CD	KMP Holdings	JYPK0125	
