= Mr. Nobody =

Mr. Nobody may refer to:

- Mr. Nobody (comics), a fictional character from the DC Comics universe
- Mr. Nobody (Mr. Men), part of the Mr. Men series of books by Roger Hargreaves
- Mr. Nobody (film), a 2009 film starring Jared Leto and directed by Jaco Van Dormael
  - Mr. Nobody (soundtrack), original score to the film
- Mr Nobody Against Putin, a 2025 documentary about a Russian teacher and propaganda
- "Mr Nobody" (Anžej Dežan song), a song by Anžej Dežan
- Mr. Nobody, a character from The Fast and the Furious film series
- "Mr. Nobody", a song by Reks from Rhythmatic Eternal King Supreme
- Mr. Nobody, a 2020 novel by actress Catherine Steadman
- Declan Brady, an Irish criminal

== See also ==
- Nobody (disambiguation)
