= Nobody Knows =

Nobody Knows may refer to:

== Film and television ==
=== Film ===
- Nobody Knows (1920 film), a German silent drama film
- Nobody Knows (1970 film), a South Korean film
- Nobody Knows (2004 film), a Japanese film

=== Television ===
- Nobody Knows (TV series), a South Korean TV series
- "Nobody Knows" (Pac-Man and the Ghostly Adventures), a television episode

== Books ==
- Nobody Knows, a 2002 novel by Mary Jane Clark

== Music ==
- Nobodyknows, a Japanese pop group
- Nobody Knows., a 2013 album by Willis Earl Beal, or the title song
- Nobody Knows: The Best of Paul Brady, a 1999 compilation album, or the 1991 title song (see below)
- Nobody Knows: The Best of the Tony Rich Project, a 2005 compilation album by Tony Rich, or the 1995 title song (see below)

=== Songs ===
- "Nobody Knows" (Celeste Buckingham song), 2011
- "Nobody Knows" (Darin song), 2012
- "Nobody Knows" (Nik Kershaw song), 1986
- "Nobody Knows" (Pink song), 2006
- "Nobody Knows" (Shawn Mendes song), 2024
- "Nobody Knows" (Tony Rich song), 1995; covered by Kevin Sharp, 1996
- "Nobody Knows", by Billy Squier from Don't Say No, 1981
- "Nobody Knows", by the Brothers Four, 1961
- "Nobody Knows", by Brute Force, 1969
- "Nobody Knows", by Destroy All Monsters, 1979
- "Nobody Knows", by the Dillards, 1965
- "Nobody Knows", by the Faces from First Step, 1970
- "Nobody Knows", by Junior English, 1969
- "Nobody Knows", by Live from V, 2001
- "Nobody Knows", by Mahalia Jackson, 1954
- "Nobody Knows", by Mike and the Mechanics from Living Years, 1988
- "Nobody Knows", by Mylène Farmer from Avant que l'ombre..., 2005
- "Nobody Knows", by Paul Brady from Trick or Treat, 1991
- "Nobody Knows", by Paul McCartney from McCartney II, 1980
- "Nobody Knows", by the Rumour, 1971
- "Nobody Knows", by September from Love CPR, 2011
- "Nobody Knows", by Slightly Stoopid from Chronchitis, 2007
- "Nobody Knows", by Sub Focus, 2016
- "Nobody Knows", by T. L. Barrett, 1971

== See also ==
- No One Knows (disambiguation)
