= The Wonder Years: Trilogy =

- From left to right: Yubin, Sunye, Sohee, Yeeun, Sunmi

EP by Wonder Girls
- Released: September 22, 2008
- Recorded: 2008
- Genre: K-pop; dance; R&B; soul
- Length: 29:47
- Language: Korean
- Label: JYP
- Producer: Park Jin-young; Bag Cham; Gil Eun-gyeong; Hong Ji-sang; K String; Lyu Yeong-min; Rainstone; Sim Eun-ji; Sin Seog-cheol; Sin Hyeon-gwon; Yeeun

Wonder Girls chronology
So Hot (2008)	The Wonder Years: Trilogy (2008)	2 Different Tears (2010)

Singles from The Wonder Years: Trilogy
- 1. "Nobody" Released: September 22, 2008

The Wonder Years: Trilogy is the first extended play by South Korean girl group Wonder Girls. The mini-album was released on September 22, 2008 in South Korea through JYP Entertainment.

== Background ==
This album contains total five songs including "Nobody", the promotional single. The official website of Wonder Girls was updated in mid-September 2008, after pictures of the group were leaked, showing a 1960s Motown concept. A teaser video for "Nobody" was then released on September 18, 2008, showcasing a ballad version of the song and scenes from the music video. The full video was then released on September 22, 2008 on the official website, and then to YouTube.

The song continued the retro theme of Wonder Girls songs, including the 1980s feel of "Tell Me" and "So Hot". However, "Nobody" is inspired by older music from the 1960s and 1970s, specifically Motown girl groups.

== Release and promotion ==
After the release of the video, "Nobody" was released to various digital outlets. Within hours, the song quickly became the #1 streamed and sold song online, to the surprise of even their management. On the day of its release, the music video was also featured on blogger Perez Hilton's website.

On September 22, 2008, the EP was released, with the title The Wonder Years: Trilogy. In addition to "Nobody", the single also had two new songs — "I Tried" and "Saying 'I Love You'" — in addition to a remix of "Nobody" and instrumental versions of all four songs. The intro track was featured in the teaser music video.

A remix of the song, titled "Anybody", featured hip-hop group Dynamic Duo, San E, and Park Jin-young. The song was given a digital release on November 18, 2008.

== "Nobody" music video ==
The music video begins with Park Jin-young performing a Motown-style concert with the Wonder Girls as his backup singers. After the show, a couple of record executives give Park sheet lyrics to the song "Nobody", which he prepares to debut on his next show.

Minutes before his show begins, Park is in the men's restroom using a toilet stall when he realizes that there is no toilet paper available. As he frantically calls for help, everyone on stage begins to wonder where he is as the show starts. The executives then motion the Wonder Girls to bring their microphone stands forward and take center stage. At the end of their performance, Park finally appears on stage to congratulate the group for their performance. While the song plays, the video becomes a montage of the group's career progressing to superstardom.

At the end of the video, Park enters another toilet stall and sees that there is toilet paper available. Unfortunately for him, he pulls the last sheet off the dispenser and once again has to call for help.

== Commercial performance ==
In the month of September 2008, the mini-album sold 28,160 copies. "Nobody" went #1 on KBS' Music Bank program in early October, then remained there for four consecutive weeks. The song also won Cyworld's "Song of the Month" award in September and October 2008, giving them a total of 5 "Song of the Month" awards, tying Big Bang. At the 2008 MKMF Awards, "Nobody" won awards for "Song of the Year" and "Best Music Video".

== Track listing ==
The Wonder Years: Trilogy – Standard edition
No.	Title	Writer(s)	Producer(s)	Length
1.	"Intro"	Park Jin-young	Park Jin-young; Rainstone; Sim Eun-ji; Sin Seog-cheol; Sin Hyeon-gwon; Gil Eun-gyeong; Lyu Yeong-min; K String	0:36
2.	"Nobody"	Park Jin-young	Park Jin-young; Rainstone	3:33
3.	"I Tried"	Hong Ji-sang	Ji-sang	3:35
4.	"Saying I Love You"	Park Ye-eun	Yeeun; Eun-ji; Seog-cheol; Hyeon-gwon; Eun-gyeong; Yeong-min; K String	3:55
5.	"Nobody" (Rainstone remix)	Park Jin-young	Park Jin-young; Rainstone; Bag Cham	4:32
6.	"Nobody" (instrumental)		Park Jin-young; Rainstone	3:34
7.	"I Tried" (instrumental)		Ji-sang	3:36
8.	"Saying I Love You" (instrumental)		Yeeun; Eun-ji; Seog-cheol; Hyeon-gwon; Eun-gyeong; Yeong-min; K String	3:55
9.	"Nobody" (Rainstone remix) (instrumental)		Park Jin-young; Rainstone; Bag Cham	4:31
Total length:				29:47

== Charts ==
Monthly chart performance
Chart (September 2008)	Peak position
South Korean Albums (RIAK)	20

== Release history ==
Region	Date	Format	Label
South Korea	September 22, 2008	CD; digital download	JYP
