= Tell Me (Wonder Girls song) =

Single by Wonder Girls

from the album The Wonder Years
- Language: Korean; English; Mandarin
- Released: September 13, 2007
- Studio: JYPE (Seoul)
- Genre: K-pop; R&B; synth-pop; disco
- Length: 3:37
- Label: JYP
- Songwriters: Park Jin-young; John Mitchell; Kim Yu-bin
- Producer: Park Jin-young

Wonder Girls singles chronology
"Irony" (2007)	"Tell Me" (2007)	"So Hot" (2008)

Music video
- "Tell Me" on YouTube

"Tell Me" is a song by South Korean girl group Wonder Girls, from their debut album The Wonder Years (2007). It was released as the lead single from the album on September 13, 2007, by JYP Entertainment. Written and produced by Park Jin-young, the song samples Stacey Q's "Two of Hearts" (1986) written by John Mitchell, Tim Greene and Sue Gatlin. "Tell Me (Rap version)", which features Yubin's self-written rap verse, was added as a B-side to their second CD single "So Hot" in May 2008.

"Tell Me" was a major commercial success in South Korea, topping all online and offline charts. It spent six non-consecutive weeks in the number one position on the domestic music program Music Bank and achieved a triple crown at Inkigayo. The song gained significant attention throughout South Korea for its choreography, which was widely imitated and featured on various online video sites.

"Tell Me" was voted the Song of the Year at the Melon Music Awards and Sports Korea Awards in 2007, and was voted the number one most popular song of the year on Gallup Korea. In 2013, it was ranked number one in a survey of the best South Korean hit idol songs conducted by Research Panel Korea. Melon and Rolling Stone named it one of top 10 greatest K-pop songs of all time for sparking a "hook song trend" in K-pop.

== Background and release ==
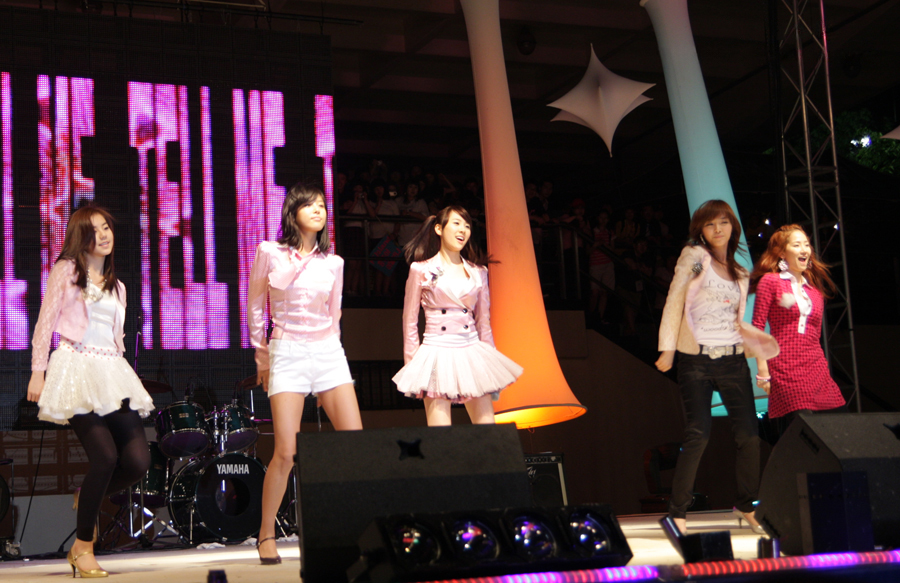
Wonder Girls performing "Tell Me" at Halla University in May 2008.

"Tell Me" is a fast-tempo song about a girl who has fallen in love. A highlight of the song is an exclamation of surprise, "어머나!" (Eomeona!, similar in meaning to "Oh, my goodness!) sung in the pre-chorus by member Sohee.

When producer Park Jin-young first introduced the song to the group, the Wonder Girls felt that the song was too different and would not be successful. However, once they were used to the song, they eventually believed it could be a strong single. The song was promoted with an updated version of the song, titled "Tell Me (Rap version)", which is the first release from the group to feature member Yubin following Hyuna's departure. On September 5, 2007, Yubin made her debut in the group's live performance of "Tell Me" on Music Bank.

"Tell Me" was initially planned to be the second English single for the group, as a follow-up to "Nobody". "Tell Me" did not see a release as a single in the United States, but an English version of the song was featured on their second extended play 2 Different Tears which was released on May 15, 2010.

=== Versions ===
The original version of "Tell Me" is featured on the group's debut album The Wonder Years and features vocals from the original line-up consisting of Min Sun-ye, Park Ye-eun, Ahn So-hee, Lee Sun-mi and Hyuna. Due to the last-minute addition of rapper Yubin to the group, her rap is not on the album version, and a version titled "Tell Me (Rap Version)" was made to include Yubin's vocals. This version was included as a B-side on the group's maxi-single So Hot (2008). The song was later re-recorded for the Japanese release of their greatest hits album WonderBest (2012) and features the band's third line-up consisting of Sunye, Yeeun, Sohee, Yubin and Hyerim, with previous members' vocals removed. "Tell Me" was recorded by the Wonder Girls in 3 languages: Korean, English, and Mandarin Chinese.

== In popular culture ==
The choreography for the song was simple and widely imitated: by October, many fan performances of the dance circulated on video sharing sites such as YouTube and Daum, including one by a group of policemen who were eventually profiled on SBS's Star King and performed both in front of and with Wonder Girls. This was dubbed the "Tell Me Syndrome" and led the girls to be named "Korea's Little Sisters". Many celebrities, including Shin Hye Sung, Super Junior's Kim Heechul, Nam Hyun Joon and Hong Kyung-min, also sang and danced to the song at their own fan meetings. The song was labelled a "pop phenomenon" by the San Francisco Chronicle, and YouTube co-founder Steve Chen stated that the dance clips were among his favorites on the website. Furthermore, on the December 28, 2007 edition of Music Bank, Big Bang joined Wonder Girls for a performance that included both "Tell Me" and "Lies".

The song has also been covered by other K-pop artists, including in full by Girls' Generation on the July 4, 2008 edition of Music Bank. This was one half of a song trade where both groups covered one song by the other group, with Wonder Girls also covering "Kissing You" on the same show. Sistar also performed a dance cover of the song on MBC's Star Dance Battle on February 3, 2011. On May 25, 2016, JYP labelmates Twice covered the song at an open concert. On December 24, 2022, NewJeans covered "Tell Me" at the SBS Gayo Daejeon.

== Accolades ==
Awards and nominations for "Tell Me"
Year	Organization	Award	Result	Ref.
2007	Cyworld Digital Music Awards	Song of the Month – October	Won	
2007	Golden Disc Awards	Digital Bonsang	Won	
2007	Golden Disc Awards	Digital Daesang	Nominated	
2007	Golden Disc Awards	Popularity Award	Won	
2007	Melon Music Awards	Song of the Year	Won	
2007	Sports Korea Awards	Song of the Year	Won	
2008	Korean Music Awards	Best Dance & Electronic Song	Won	
2008	Korean Music Awards	Song of the Year	Nominated	

Music program wins (10 total)
Program	Date	Ref.
Inkigayo	October 28, 2007	
Inkigayo	November 11, 2007	
Inkigayo	November 18, 2007	
Music Bank	November 2, 2007	
Music Bank	November 9, 2007	
Music Bank	November 30, 2007	
Music Bank	December 7, 2007	
Music Bank	December 28, 2007	
Music Bank	January 4, 2008	
M Countdown	November 8, 2007	

== Legacy ==
Tamar Herman of Billboard called the song the most influential song in Wonder Girls' career, writing that it "went viral as YouTube was just beginning out and resulted in a dance craze in South Korea based around the single's easy-to-learn choreography". In a 2013 survey of 21,955 people conducted by Research Panel Korea, "Tell Me" was voted as the best hit idol song of all time. In 2014, Mnet included "Tell Me" in their list of "Legend 100 Songs", a list of some of the most influential songs in Korean music history. In the same year, Star News named the track one of the ten best digital hit songs in South Korea. In a survey involving 2,000 people and 30 Korean music critics published by The Dong-a Ilbo in 2016, it was chosen as the second best female idol song by both the public and music experts in the past 20 years.

In a ranking conducted by 35 Korean music critics and industry professionals curated by Melon and newspaper Seoul Shinmun in 2021, "Tell Me" was named the ninth best K-pop song of all time. Music critic Hwang Seon-yeop said that "If I were to pick the most important event in the chronicle of K-pop, I think I could say without hesitation that it was the 'butterfly effect caused by this song'". Hwang added the song symbols "the starting point of the so-called 'hook song' trend, which uses addictive repeating phrases and emphasizes the importance of 'choreography' in idol pop. [...] This is a work that defined the concept of K-pop and opened up its revival in earnest." In 2023, Rolling Stone named it the tenth greatest song in the history of Korean pop music, writing that "Wonder Girls established a blueprint of catchiness with 'Tell Me,' one of K-pop’s first modern 'hook songs' and one of the first to spark a dance craze".

"Tell Me" on select critic lists and polls
Publisher	List	Rank	Year
Billboard	Every Wonder Girls Single Ranked: Critic’s Take	1	2017
The Dong-a Ilbo	Best female idol songs according to experts	2	2016
The Dong-a Ilbo	Best female idol songs according to the public	2	2016
Gallup Korea	Most Popular Songs of 2007	1	2007
Gallup Korea	10 Most Beloved K-pop Songs of the 21st Century	3	2024
IZM	20 Best Singles of the Year	Included	2007
Melon	Top 100 K-pop Songs of All Time	9	2021
Mnet	Legend 100 Songs	Included	2014
Music Y	120 Best Dance Tracks of All Time	8	2014
Research Panel Korea	Best hit idol songs of all time	1	2013
Rolling Stone	100 Greatest Songs in the History of Korean Pop Music	10	2023
Star News	10 Best Digital Hit Songs in the Past 10 Years	Included	2014

== Credits and personnel ==
Recording

- Recorded at JYPE Studio, Gangnam-gu, Seoul

Personnel

- Wonder Girls – vocals
  - Kim Yu-bin – rap lyricist
- Park Jin-young – lyricist, composer, arranger
- Rhee Woo-seok (Rainstone) – composer
- John Mitchell Dixon – composer
- JYP Entertainment – executive producer

== Release history ==
Region	Date	Version	Format	Label
Various	September 13, 2007	Original	Digital download; streaming	JYP
Various	June 3, 2008	Rap version	Digital download; streaming	JYP
Various	February 10, 2010	Mandarin	Digital download; streaming	JYP
Various	May 15, 2010	English	Digital download; streaming	JYP
Various	November 14, 2012	2012 version	Digital download; streaming	JYP
