= Melon Music Award for Song of the Year =

South Korean music award

- Awarded for: Top performing singles
- Country: South Korea
- Presented by: Kakao M
- First award: 2005 (online); 2009 (ceremony)
- Currently held by: Ive – "Bang Bang" (2026)

Highlights
- Most wins: BTS (4)
- Website: Official website

The Melon Music Award for Song of the Year is one of the awards from the annual Melon Music Awards, an event that uses data from Melon's streaming service to celebrate artists who have had exceptional performance during the year. The Song of the Year category recognizes the top performing single in South Korea based on various metrics such as digital performance, voting, and judge evaluation.

From 2005 to 2008, awards for best song of the year were based entirely on online voting and were announced on Melon's website. Live ceremonies began in Seoul starting in 2009, with Song of the Year becoming one of the ceremonies' daesang (grand prize) awards. The award is determined through several criteria; as of 2021, 60% of the evaluation is based on figures for digital downloads and streaming, 20% from the evaluation of a panel of judges, and 20% from online voting.

The artist with the most Song of the Year awards is BTS, having won four times in 2017, 2019, 2020 and 2021 with "Spring Day", "Boy with Luv", "Dynamite" and "Butter", respectively. Wonder Girls received the award twice during its online period, with "Tell Me" and "So Hot" receiving the most votes in 2007 and 2008, respectively. IU has the most nominations in the category with eight nominations, winning once for "Good Day" in 2011.

== Winners and nominees ==
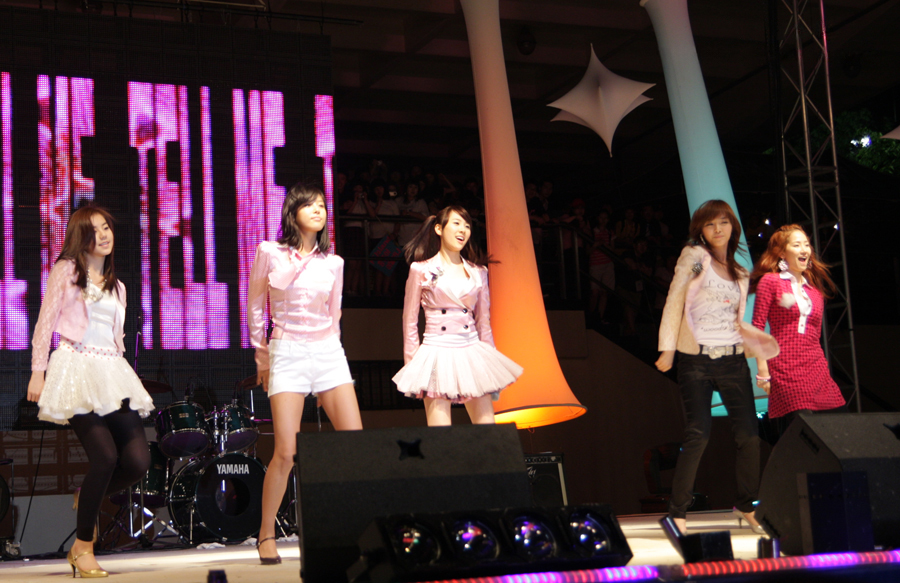
Wonder Girls received the Best Song award in 2007–08.

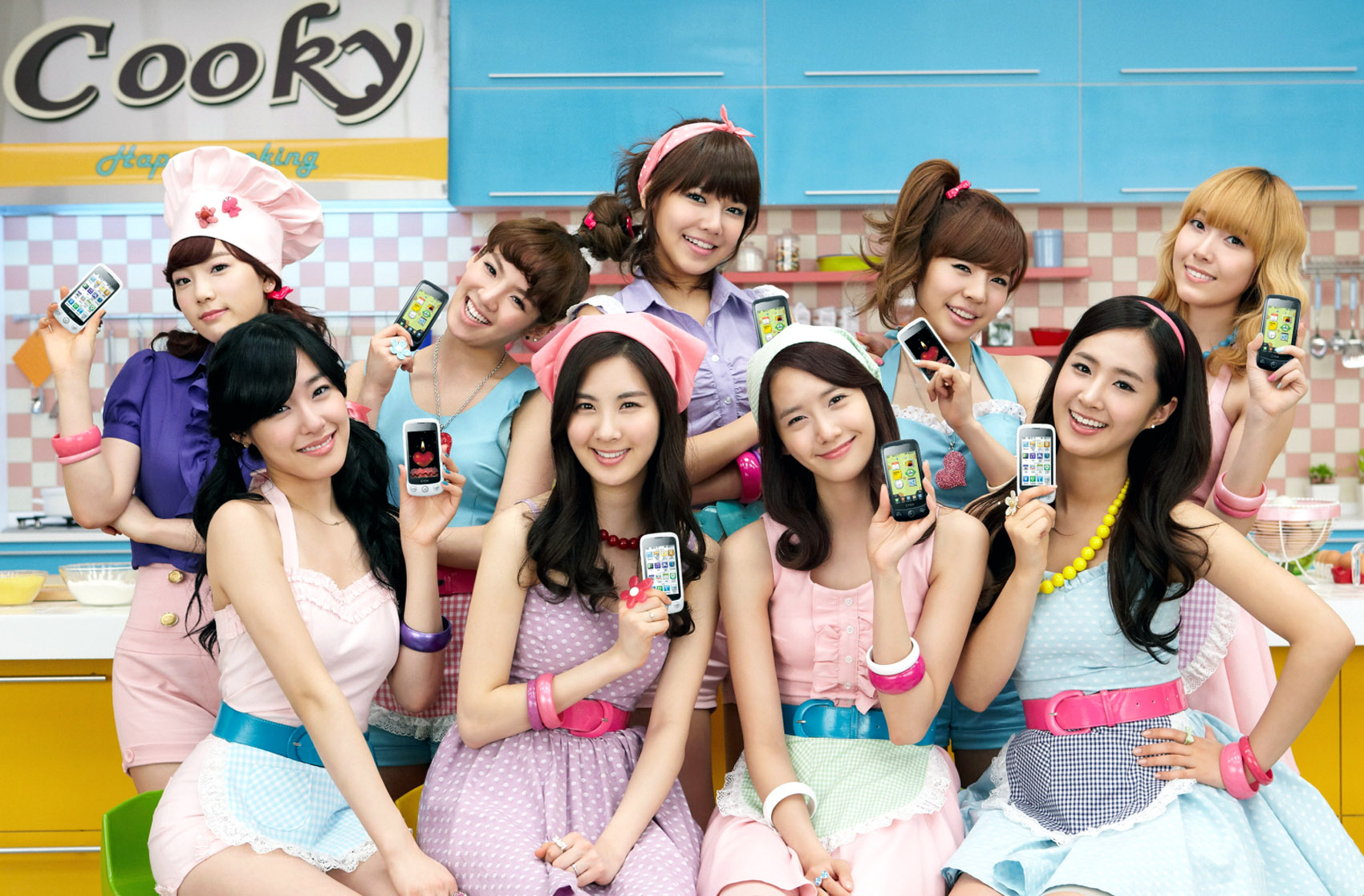
2009 award winner for "Gee", Girls' Generation

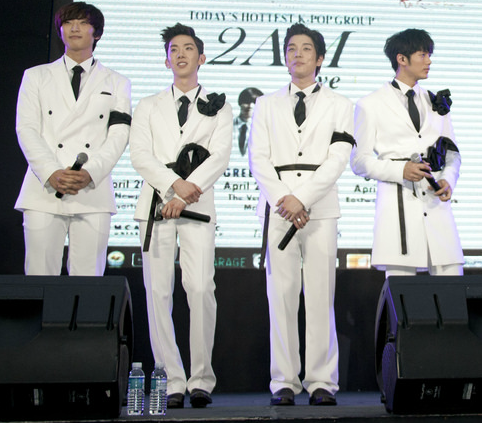
2010 winner 2AM for "Can't Let You Go Even If I Die"

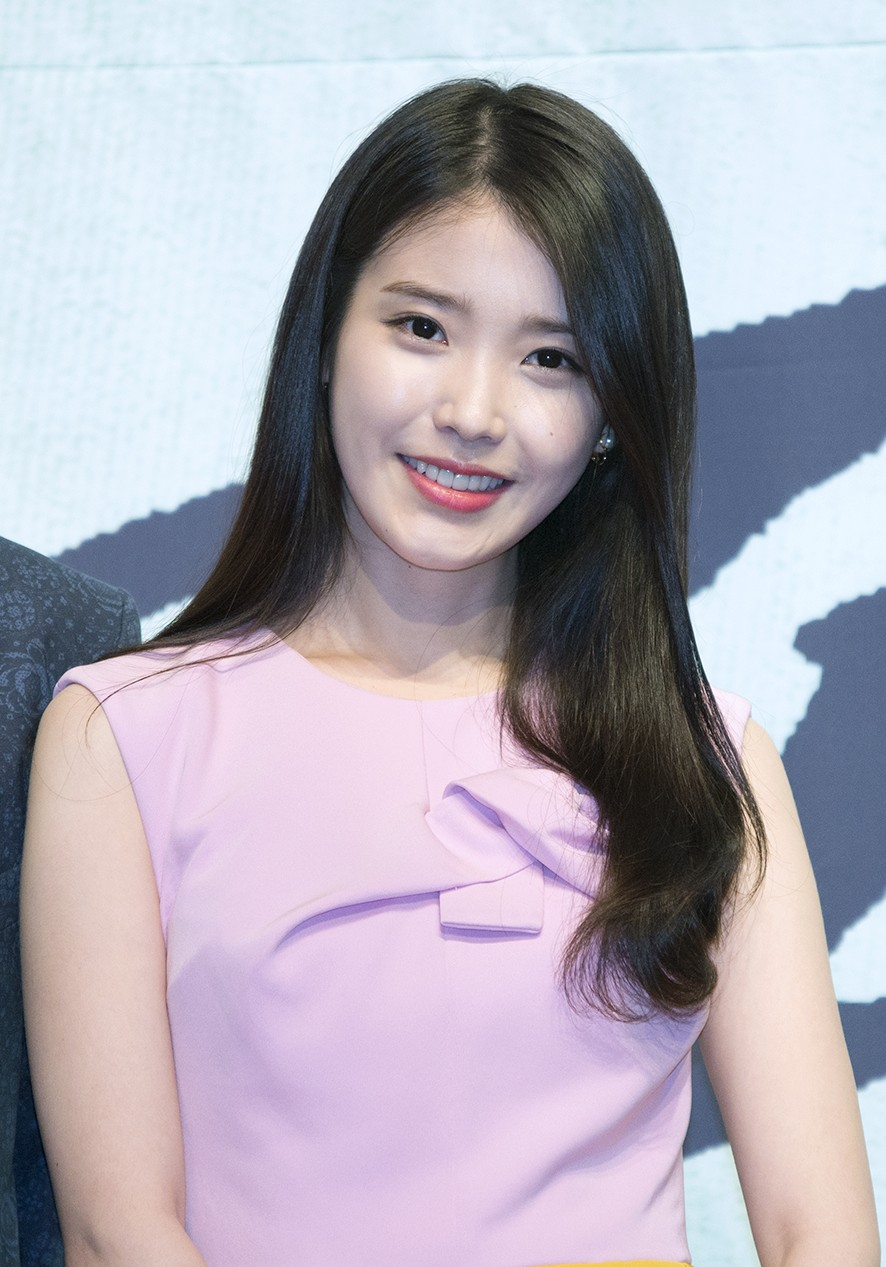
2011 recipient IU, winning for "Good Day"

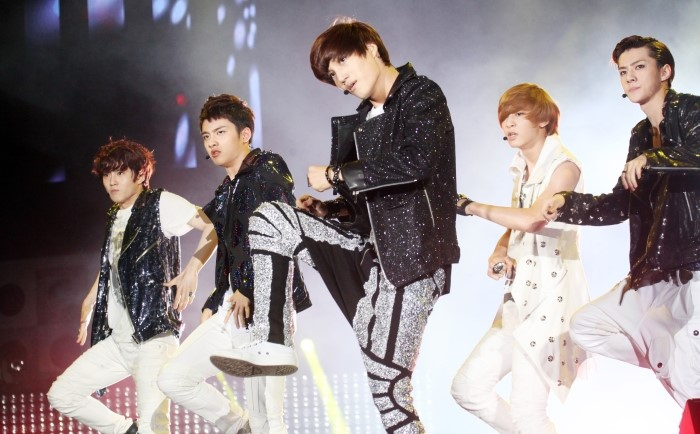
2013 recipient for "Growl", Exo

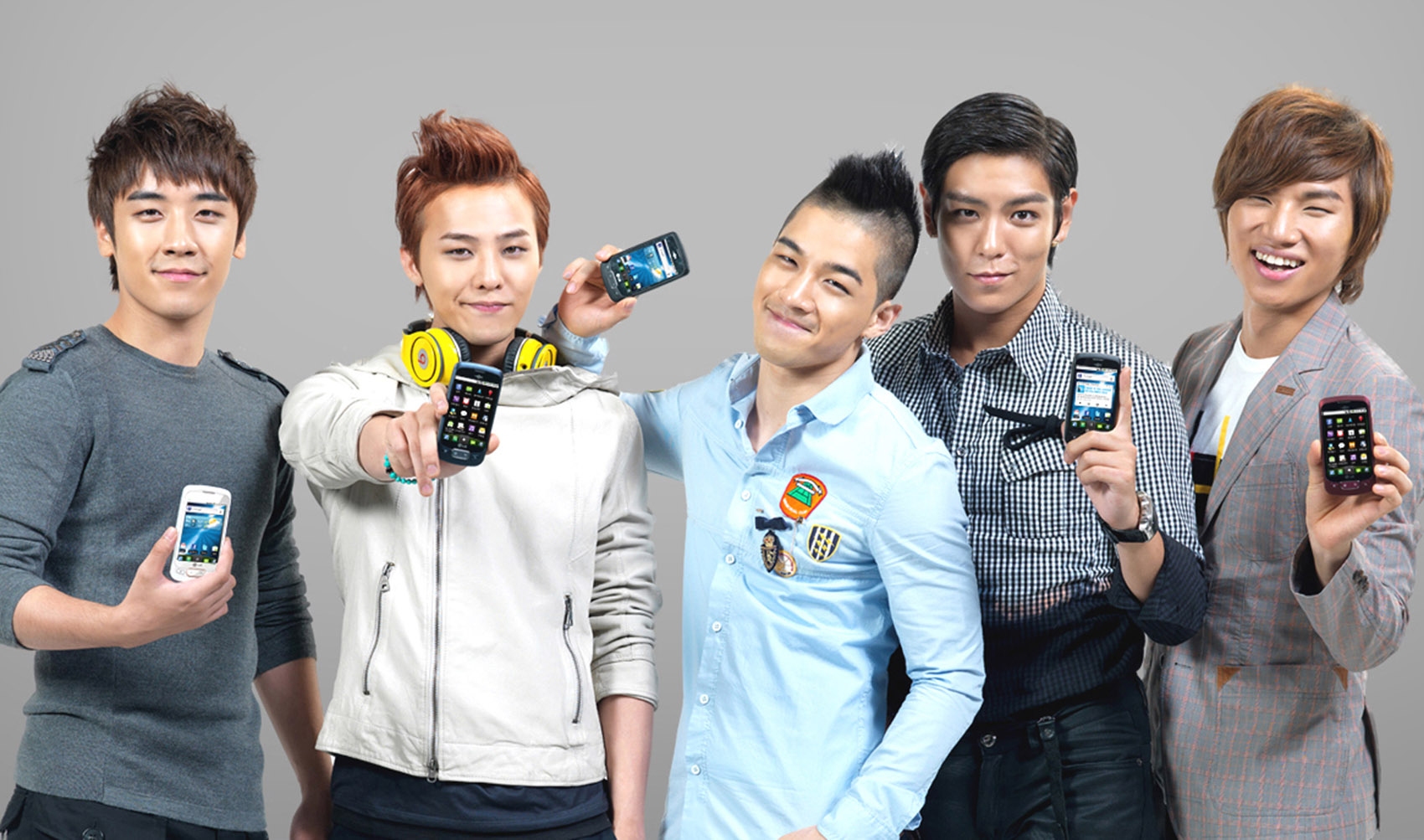
2015 recipient BigBang, winning for "Bang Bang Bang"

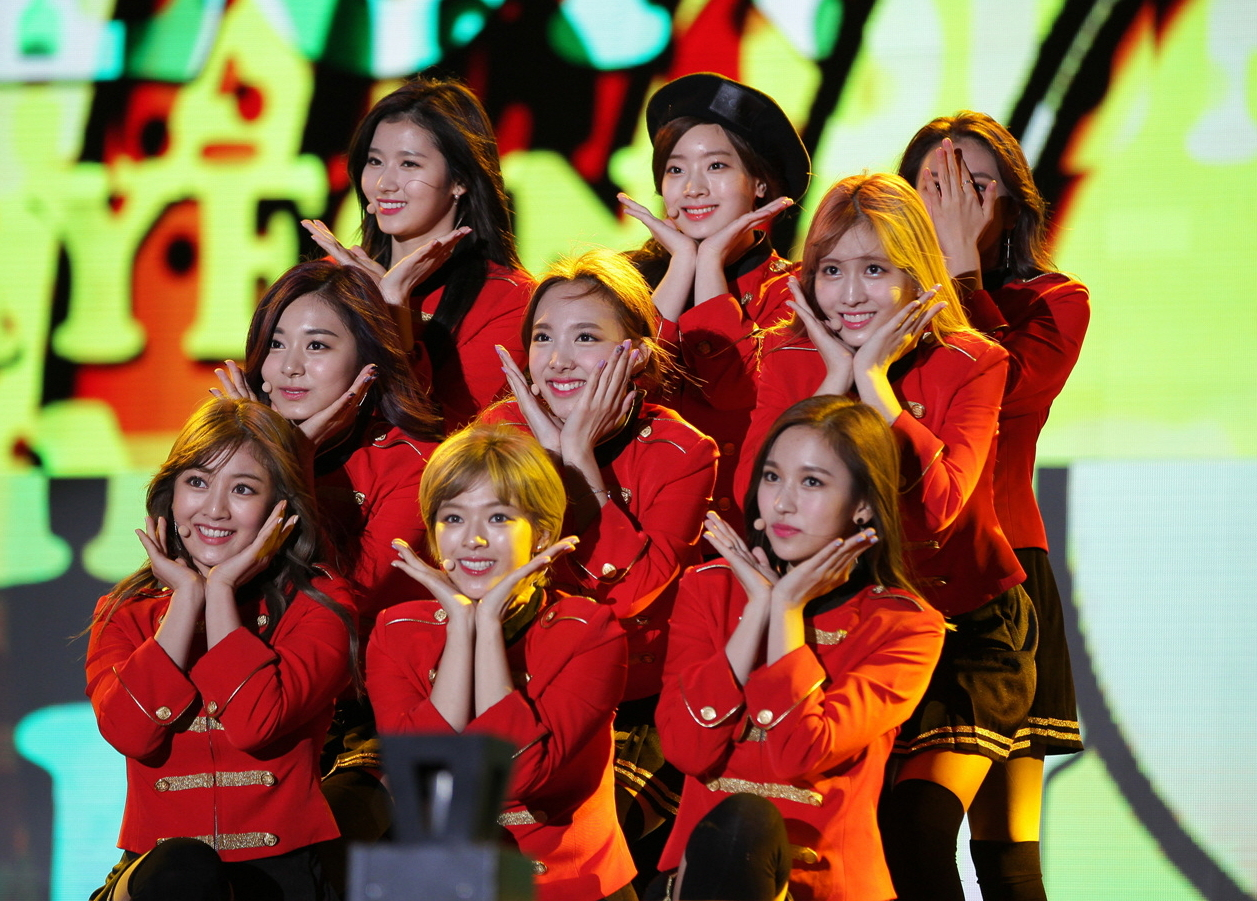
Twice won the award for "Cheer Up" in 2016.

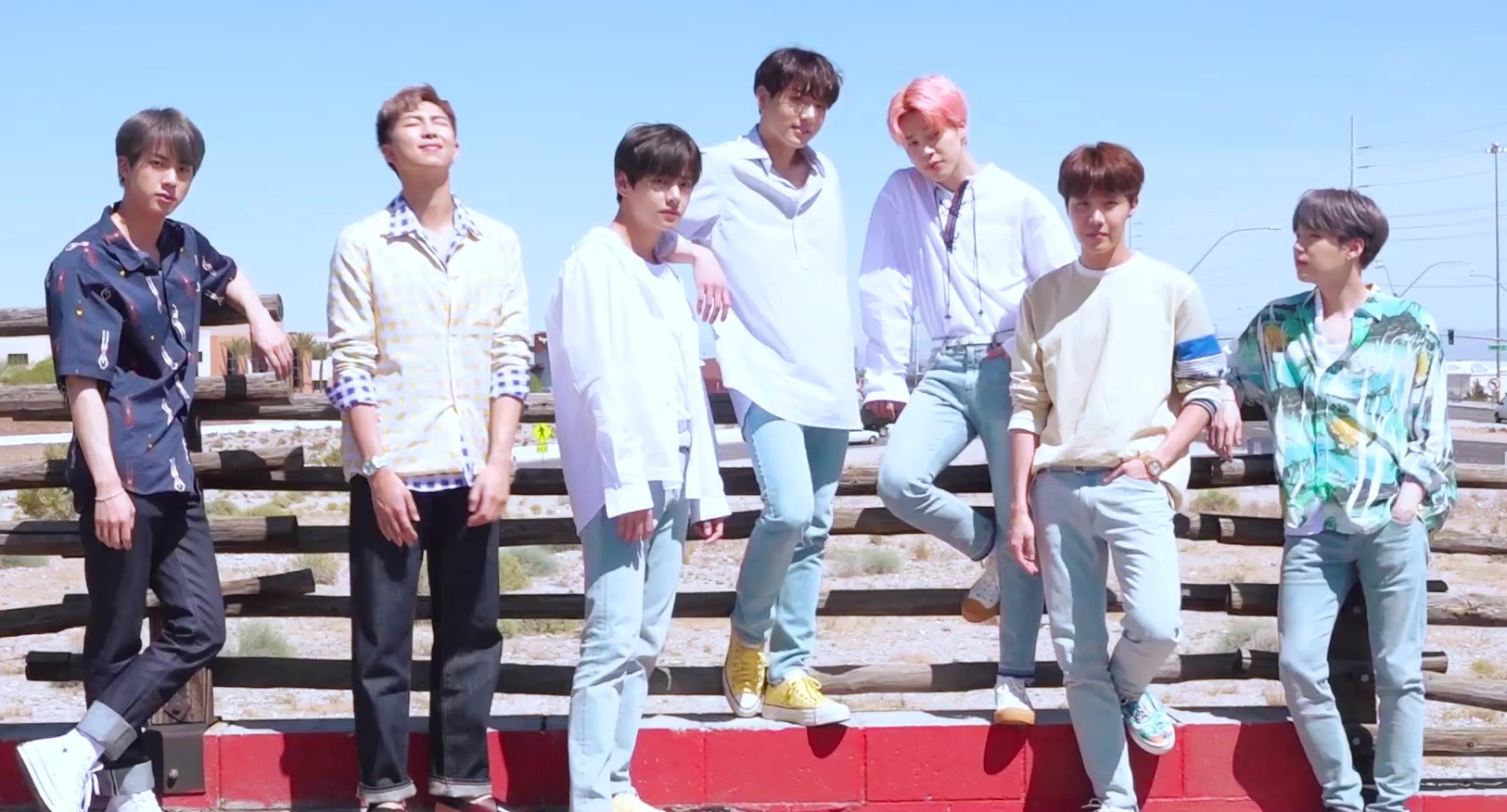
Four-time award winner BTS, winning in 2017 and 2019–21

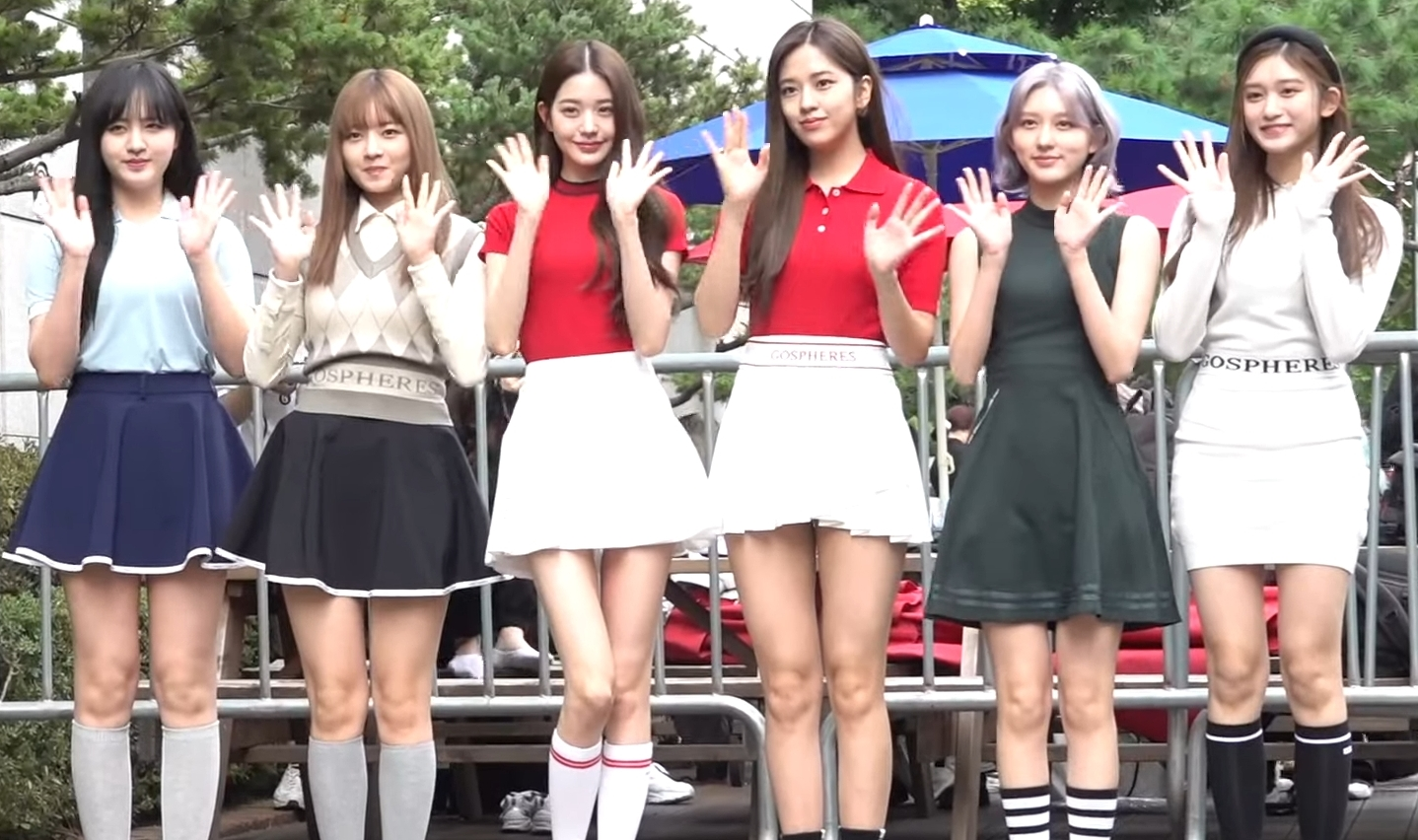
Two-time award winner Ive, winning in 2022 and 2026

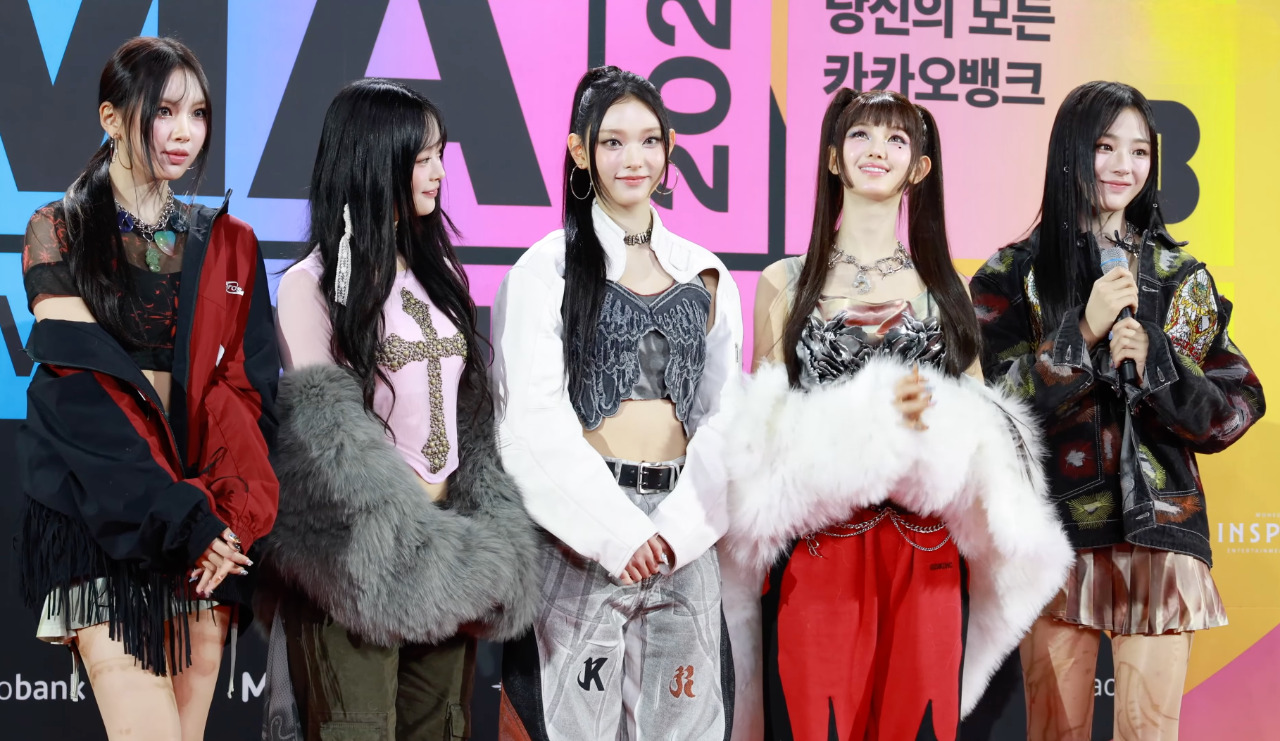
2023 winner NewJeans for "Ditto"

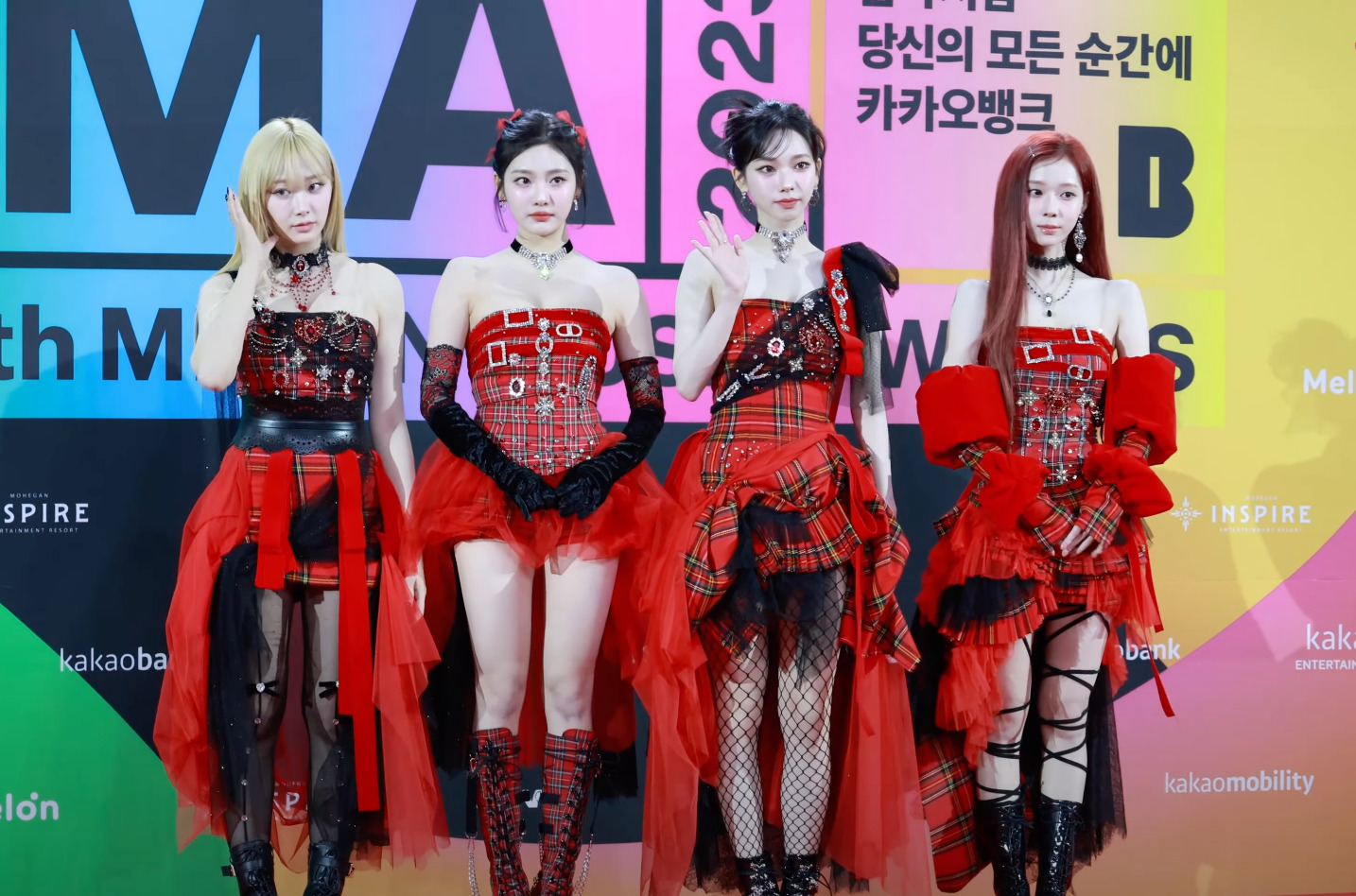
2024 winner Aespa for "Supernova"

List of online award winners (2005–2008)
Year (Note: Winners for the event were announced online from 2005 to 2008.)	Winner(s)	Song	Ref.
2005	Epik High	"Fly"	
2006	Baek Ji-young	"I Won't Love"	
2007	Wonder Girls	"Tell Me"	
2008	Wonder Girls	"So Hot"	

List of daesang award winners and nominees (2009–present)
Year	Winner(s)	Song	Nominees (Note: Shortlisted nominees only—except for 2009, where no shortlist was announced)	Ref.
2009	Girls' Generation	"Gee"	Initial nominees: 2NE1 – "Fire"; 2NE1 – "I Don't Care"; 2PM – "Again & Again"; 4Minute – "Hot Issue"; 8Eight – "I Have No Heart"; Davichi – "8282"; Davichi – "I Made a Mistake"; Baek Ji-young – "Candy in My Ear" (featuring Taecyeon); Brown Eyed Girls – "Abracadabra"; Big Bang & 2NE1 – "Lollipop"; Girls' Generation – "Genie"; Son Dam-bi – "Saturday Night"; Super Junior – "Sorry, Sorry"; SeeYa, Davichi, T-ara – "Women's Generation"; Lee Seung-gi – "Will You Marry Me"; K.Will – "Tears Dripping"; K.Will – "Love 119"; G-Dragon – "Heartbreaker"; Outsider – "The Alone"	
2010	2AM	"Can't Let You Go Even If I Die"	Girls' Generation – "Oh!"; 2NE1 – "Go Away"; Lee Seung-gi – "Love Taught Me To Drink"; CNBLUE – "I'm a Loner"	
2011	IU	"Good Day"	2NE1 – "I Am the Best"; Beast – "On Rainy Days"; GG (Park Myung-soo, G-Dragon) ft. Park Bom – "Having an Affair"; T-ara – "Roly-Poly"	
2012	Psy	"Gangnam Style"	Busker Busker – "Cherry Blossom Ending"; Sistar – "Alone"; IU – "You & I"; Trouble Maker – "Trouble Maker"	
2013	Exo	"Growl"	Busker Busker – "Love, At First"; Beast – "Shadow"; IU – "The Red Shoes"; G-Dragon – "Who You?"	
2014	Taeyang	"Eyes, Nose, Lips"	IU – "Friday" ft. Jang Yi-jeong; Soyou, Junggigo – "Some"; Park Hyo-shin – "Wild Flower"; San E, Raina – "A Midsummer Night's Honey"	
2015	BigBang	"Bang Bang Bang"	Sistar – "Shake It"; Apink – "Luv"; Exo – "Call Me Baby"; Toy – "Three of Us"	
2016	Twice	"Cheer Up"	Zico – "I Am You, You Are Me"; Urban Zakapa – "I Don't Love You"; GFriend – "Rough"; MC the Max – "No Matter Where"	
2017	BTS	"Spring Day"	IU – "Through the Night"; Exo – "Ko Ko Bop"; Bolbbalgan4 – "Tell Me You Love Me"; Ailee – "I Will Go to You Like the First Snow"	
2018	iKon	"Love Scenario"	Blackpink – "Ddu-Du Ddu-Du"; Twice – "Heart Shaker"; Mamamoo – "Starry Night"; BTS – "Fake Love"	
2019	BTS	"Boy with Luv" (feat. Halsey)	Ben – "180 Degrees"; Chungha – "Gotta Go"; Jannabi – "For Lovers Who Hesitate"; N.Flying – "Rooftop"	
2020	BTS	"Dynamite"	Blackpink – "How You Like That"; Red Velvet – "Psycho"; IU – "Eight" (featuring Suga)"; Zico – "Any Song"	
2021	BTS	"Butter"	Aespa – "Next Level"; IU – "Celebrity"; Oh My Girl – "Dun Dun Dance"; Lee Mu-jin – "Traffic Light"	
2022	Ive	"Love Dive"	(G)I-dle – "Tomboy"; Kim Min-seok – "Drunken Confession"; Psy – "That That" (featuring Suga); BigBang – "Still Life"	
2023	NewJeans	"Ditto"	I-dle – "Queencard"; Aespa – "Spicy"; BSS – "Fighting"; Ive – "I Am"	
2024	Aespa	"Supernova"	I-dle – "Fate"; IU – "Love Wins All"; Lee Chang-sub – "Heavenly Fate"; TWS – "Plot Twist"	
2025	G-Dragon	"Home Sweet Home" (featuring Taeyang and Daesung)	10cm – "To Reach You"; Babymonster – "Drip"; BoyNextDoor – "If I Say, I Love You"; Huntrix – "Golden"; Ive – "Rebel Heart"; Jennie – "Like Jennie"; Park Da-hye and Maktub – "Starting With You"; Rosé – "Toxic Till the End"; Zo Zazz – "Don't You Know"	
2026	Ive	"Bang Bang"	BTS – "Swim"; Cortis – "RedRed"; Hearts2Hearts – "Rude!"; KiiiKiii – "404 (New Era)"	

== Artists with multiple wins ==
4 wins

- BTS

2 wins

- Ive
- Wonder Girls
- Taeyang

== Artists with multiple nominations ==
8 nominations

- IU

6 nominations

- BTS

5 nominations

- 2NE1

4 nominations

- Ive

3 nominations

- G-Dragon
- Exo
- BigBang
- Aespa
- (G)I-dle

== See also ==
- Mnet Asian Music Award for Song of the Year
- Melon Music Award for Album of the Year
