= Trunk Networks =

- Company type: Private
- Industry: Internet; VoIP; Cloud services
- Founded: 2008; 18 years ago
- Headquarters: Uckfield, England, UK
- Area served: United Kingdom
- Key people: Darren Elsom(director)
- Products: Internet services; Landline telephone services
- Total assets: ▼£172,012 (2021); £50,458 (2020)
- Number of employees: ▲9 (2021); 8 (2020)
- Website: www.trunknetworks.com

Trunk Networks was a British internet service provider (ISP) and cloud service provider based in Uckfield, offering business and residential broadband and VoIP services, amongst others. The company was founded in 2008 as the result of a merger between a virtual ISP and an IT support company.

They provided Fibre to the Premises (FTTP) broadband services and VoIP telephone services over the Openreach and CityFibre networks.Jackson, Mark (21 August 2020). "Trunk Networks Refresh FTTP Broadband Plans and Cuts Prices". ISPreview UK. Trunk Networks went into liquidation in September 2022.
