= No One Knows (EP) =

2010 EP by Stephy Tang

EP by Stephy Tang (鄧麗欣, 邓丽欣)
- Released: July 16, 2010
- Genres: Pop; Cantopop; Dance pop
- Length: 12:38
- Label: Gold Typhoon

Stephy Tang (鄧麗欣, 邓丽欣) chronology
Music Cafe (2009)	No One Knows (2010)	過得比我好 (2012)

Singles from No One Knows
- 1. "No One Knows" Released: July 16, 2010

Music video
- "No One Knows" on YouTube

No One Knows is an extended play (EP) by Hong Kong actress and singer Stephy Tang (鄧麗欣, 邓丽欣), released on July 16, 2010, by Gold Typhoon. The title song was released as the first single and MV; it is the first of four tracks and was written by Roxanne Seeman, Kine Ludvigsen-Fossheim, and Olav Fossheim, with Cantonese lyrics by Yan Kin Keung. Tang sings all four tracks in Cantonese.

== Concept and style ==
The concept behind the album was to create a new image for Stephy Tang, former member of the Cantopop group Cookies, transforming Tang into a sexy dance queen. This included image guidance, line dance, costumes and songs. Tang's dance style was influenced by Kelly Chen.

The style of the album is '90s retro disco. The EP includes four uptempo dance songs including No One Knows and High Heels. The attitudes of the songs are focused on issues of modern women and their values of love and living in the material world. leaving behind any connection with the "tenderness" she was known for. The lyrics of the songs of the "No One Know" album reflect feminism of the new generation.

Roxanne Seeman, Kine Ludvigsen, and Olav Fossheim, who wrote songs for Jacky Cheung's Private Corner album, wrote the single and title track "No One Knows".

== Background ==
Tang trained secretly for six months in preparation for the release of "No One Knows", an album of uptempo dance tracks. She put in rigorous rehearsal time learning the dance steps to the new songs, along with running, practicing yoga and cycling to be more explosive when performing the dance routines. Stephy shot a promotion clip wearing a hot red outfit.

== Album packaging ==
In the July 13, 2010, radio interview, Tang said that the cover of the album is a half-length photo explaining "The lower body was so sexy at the time of shooting, but the cover is not visible because I want to leave some mystery for everyone."

== Press conference and release ==
A press conference was held on July 16, 2010. The weather was overcast and unpredictable after Typhoon No. 1 had brought rain and clouds the day before. Despite being held outdoors with an unexpected sudden downpour, after a 40 minute delay the conference proceeded. Tang gave a lively dance performance in the rain, wearing a provocative, revealing outfit. She then sang a song. Chen Huihong (陈辉虹)presented Tang with a pair of dance shoes, wishing her success.

Coinciding the release of the album which became a summer hit, Stephy Tang appeared in stylish and fashionable outfits, promoting her album and new look on the internet and various media.

In a radio interview on July 13, 2010, Tang announced the new album would be released on July 15, and her music videos for Taiwanese songs and new song will be released in a week, a new marketing method that had not been done before.

== Chart performance ==
The title single charted 3rd for HK Metro Radio 907 (新城電台) and TVB, 5th on RTHK (Radio Television Hong Kong) and 11th on CRHK (Commercial Radio Hong Kong 903).

== Track listing ==
No One Knows
No.	Title	Length
1.	"No One Knows"	3:23
2.	"花小姐"	2:56
3.	"我是..."	3:16
4.	"High Heels"	3:02

No One Knows (Stephy x Y.E.S.- 3D感官版)

EP by Stephy Tang
- Released: February 1, 2011
- Genre: Pop
- Label: Gold Typhoon

== No One Knows (Stephy x Y.E.S.- 3D感官版) ==
A reissue of the EP titled No One Knows (Stephy x Y.E.S.- 3D感官版) was released by Gold Typhoon Hong Kong on February 1, 2011. It contains the four tracks from the original EP with duets by South Korean girl group Y.E.S. and an additional track in Mandarin. The title song is the second track.

=== Track listing ===
No One Knows
No.	Title	Length
1.	"Tonight"	3:36
2.	"No One Knows"	3:23
3.	"花小姐"	2:56
4.	"我是..."	3:16
5.	"High Heels"	3:02
