= Nobody (Wonder Girls song) =

2008 single by Wonder Girls

- From left to right: Yubin, Sunye, Sohee, Yeeun, Sunmi

Single by Wonder Girls

from the album The Wonder Years: Trilogy
- Language: Korean; Japanese; English; Chinese
- Released: September 22, 2008
- Studio: JYPE Studio (Seoul); JYP Manhattan Studio (New York)
- Genre: K-pop; dance-pop; electropop
- Length: 3:34
- Label: JYP
- Songwriters: Park Jin-young; Rhee Woo-seok
- Producer: Park Jin-young

Wonder Girls singles chronology
"So Hot" (2008)	"Nobody" (2008)	"2 Different Tears" (2010)

Music video
- "Nobody" on YouTube

"Nobody" is a song by the South Korean girl group Wonder Girls, taken from their first extended play The Wonder Years: Trilogy (2008). It was written and produced by Park Jin-young, with additional songwriting by Rhee Woo-seok. Musically, "Nobody" is retro-inspired dance-pop song that lyrically conveys the affections the members' have towards their lovers. The song was first released in South Korea on September 22, 2008, by JYP Entertainment, and was re-released in English on June 26, 2009, where it was included in their next EP 2 Different Tears (2010). A Japanese version of the song was included on their debut Japanese EP, Nobody for Everybody (2012).

"Nobody" was a commercial success; it was a top search term in South Korea upon its release and ranked number one on various digital music sites. In the United States, the English version of the track set a milestone in K-pop—it was the first song by a Korean artist to appear on the US Billboard Hot 100, entering at number 76 on the chart issue dated October 31, 2009. In 2017, Billboard named "Nobody" one of the greatest girl group songs of all time.

Three music videos for "Nobody" were filmed: versions in Korean, English, and Japanese. In South Korea, promotions for the single featured the group performing it on various music programs throughout late 2008. A performance of "Nobody" on M Countdown uploaded by Mnet that November became the most viewed K-pop video on the platform, and became the first K-pop video to surpass 50 million views in 2011. In the US, the group performed it as part of the opening act for Jonas Brothers World Tour 2009.

== Background and release ==
The song first appeared on their first mini-album The Wonder Years: Trilogy (2008), including a remix and instrumental versions. An English version of "Nobody" served as their debut single in the country. The English version of "Nobody" was released to iTunes on June 26, 2009, and to Amazon MP3 a day later. A physical single was released in a cross-promotion with Justice stores on October 11, 2009, and the Wonder Girls promoted the release with two meet-and-greet events at Justice stores. The song was also included on their subsequent extended play, 2 Different Tears (2010).

Various remixes of "Nobody" were produced for various award shows and end-of-year specials. A remix of the English version of the song by American DJ Jason Nevins was included on the "remix edition" single. A downtempo, re-recorded remix produced by Rainstone was released in both Korean and English.

In 2010, the Wonder Girls entered the Chinese market with the compilation Wonder Girls (2010), which featured a Chinese version of "Nobody". In May 2012, the Wonder Girls announced their official debut into the Japanese market with DefStar Records with a Japanese version of Nobody, "Nobody ～あなたしか見えない～", in a Japanese debut EP titled Nobody for Everybody, released on July 25, 2012.

== Commercial performance ==
In the United States, the physical single for the song sold 17,000 copies in its first week. On the Billboard Hot 100 chart issue dated October 31, 2009, "Nobody" debuted at number 76, making it the first K-pop song to enter the chart. An editor from PopCrush attributed the chart entry in part to the group opening for The Jonas Brothers' summer U.S. tour "when the Disney boy band was at the height of [their] popularity." On November 20, it was reported that the single had sold 32,000 physical copies and over 30,000 digital downloads according to Nielsen Soundscan. It became the best-selling physical single of the year in the United States, topping the year-end Billboard Hot Single Sales chart for 2009, which measured commercial singles sales over the year across the North American region. By February 2012, the single had sold 78,000 downloads and 42,000 physical copies in the US.

In February 2010, the song debuted and peaked at number 4 on the Canadian Singles Chart. In March 2011, the track re-entered the chart, again at number 4. Representatives for JYP found this surprising, commenting: "It's been about two years now, so we're glad that it was achieved without any promotions."

At the 2011 China Mobile Wireless Music Awards, the Wonder Girls were awarded the "Top Gross Selling Digital Downloads" award in the foreign group category for 5,371,903 downloads sold of the singles "Nobody", "Tell Me" and "2 Different Tears".

== Music video ==
=== Korean and English ===
The music video begins with Park Jin-young performing a Motown-style concert with the Wonder Girls as his backup singers. After the show, a couple of record executives give Park sheet lyrics to the song "Nobody", which he prepares to debut on his next show during the 1960s. Minutes before his show begins, Park is in the men's restroom using a toilet stall when he realizes that there is no toilet paper available. As he frantically calls for help, everyone on stage begins to wonder where he is as the show starts. The executives then motion the Wonder Girls to bring their microphone stands forward and take center stage. At the end of their performance, Park finally appears on stage to congratulate the group for their performance. While the song plays, the video becomes a montage of the group's career progressing to superstardom. At the end of the video, Park enters another toilet stall and sees that there is toilet paper available. Unfortunately for him, he pulls the last sheet off the dispenser and once again has to call for help.

=== Japanese ===
The PV begins with Sohee holding a newspaper The New York Lines with the "wonderful" Wonder Girls as the front cover and an article titled "Nobody, the worldwide hit". Sohee in white shades folds the newspaper. Then, it reveals that the Wonder Girls are in an airplane. The screen pans from left to right, showing the members in neon dresses: Sunye in green, Hyelim in blue, Yoobin in orange, Yeeun in yellow, and Sohee in pink. As the airplane side slides down, the members walk out from the stairs to be greeted by paparazzi. The girls walk forward to a stage. Yoobin begins with "it'll never change" and the song begins with the girls dancing with their microphone stands. After Sohee's second verse and during Yeeun's chorus, it pans out to show a black-and-white TV showing the "Nobody" music video. A family is watching and dancing to "Nobody" in one room; the cameras pans to another room with two ladies dancing along. The TV is zoomed in to see the girls in upgraded golden dresses. The stage is changed to have a live band. The song continues and ends with Yoobin's rap and a pose with the microphones.

== Live performances and promotion ==
The Wonder Girls had their official comeback on the weekend of September 26–28, 2008, performing on KBS's Music Bank, MBC's Show! Music Core, and SBS's Inkigayo. At the end of October, the group briefly used the "Rainstone Remix" of the song. A video of their M Countdown performance from October 9, 2008 was posted to Mnet's official YouTube channel on November 18, and soon became the most viewed K-pop video on the platform. In 2011, it became the first K-pop video to surpass 50 million views. At the 2008 Mnet KM Music Festival on November 15, 2008, Wonder Girls performed a tango version and a disco version of "Nobody". The rest of the remixes debuted at the 23rd Golden Disc Awards on December 10, which showcased each Wonder Girl performing a short clip of a unique "Nobody" remix. On August 8, 2015, they performed a live band version of the song in conjunction with their 2015 comeback as a 4 member band at You Hee-yeol's Sketchbook.

For their American live television debut, they performed "Nobody" on The Wendy Williams Show on July 20, 2009. They also performed it on So You Think You Can Dance on December 9. Their first live performance of the Japanese version of Nobody was at the Girls Award 2012 Spring/Summer by Crooz fashion event in Tokyo. Wonder Girls were the only Korean group to be invited at the event as one of the performing artists, aside from opening act, Code-V.

== Other usage ==
In 2013, the song was featured in the sixth episode of the South Korean television drama series Master's Sun. In 2014, "Nobody" was used in the DreamWorks animated movie Penguins of Madagascar. Hyerim said, "It's an honor for us to represent Asian artists and have our song selected for the great animated film." Yubin added that "We hope this will help shed light on more works by Asian artists".

In March 2009, it was reported that both JYP Entertainment and Sony/ATV Music Publishing would be taking legal action against other Asian musical groups who had adopted or covered "Nobody" illegally. JYP Entertainment stated that groups and actresses in the People's Republic of China and Cambodia had been "recklessly copying" the group's songs, dances, and costumes.

== Legacy ==
In 2017, Billboard ranked it as the 43rd greatest girl group song of all-time, deeming it as a breakthrough moment in K-pop history where it marked one of the first indicators that Korean acts had appeal in the United States. Tamar Herman of the same publication wrote that "It revived the industry with a modern update to old school sounds that drew on Motown and the disco era for inspiration, which resulted in the single becoming one of the most popular Korean songs ever." PopCrush said that what perhaps made entering Billboard "especially momentous was the fact that they remained true to their signature style, and didn't change it to appeal to accommodate American audiences." In a ranking by 35 music experts curated by Melon and Seoul Shinmun in 2021, "Nobody" was ranked the 27th best K-pop song of all time. Music critic Han Dong-yoon said that the song's simple choreography and structure propelled it to becoming a hit. However, he pointed out that although it was not a huge commercial success in the United States, it holds important value in K-pop history as it became an example of how Korean singers could enter foreign markets.

== Awards ==
Awards and nominations for "Nobody"
Year	Organization	Award	Result	Ref.
2008	Cyworld Digital Music Awards	Song of the Month (September)	Won	
2008	Cyworld Digital Music Awards	Song of the Month (October)	Won	
2008	Golden Disc Awards	Digital Song Bonsang	Won	
2008	Golden Disc Awards	Digital Daesang	Nominated	
2008	Golden Disc Awards	Popularity Award	Nominated	
2008	Mnet KM Music Festival	Song of the Year	Won	
2008	Mnet KM Music Festival	Best Music Video	Won	
2008	Mnet KM Music Festival	Best Dance Performance	Nominated	
2008	Sports Korea Awards	Song of the Year	Won	
2009	Korean Music Awards	Song of the Year	Nominated	
2009	Korean Music Awards	Best Dance & Electronic Song	Nominated	
2009	Philippine K-pop Awards	Song of the Year	Won	
2009	Seoul Music Awards	Best Song	Won	
2010	Myx Music Awards	Favorite International Video	Nominated	
2011	RTHK International Pop Poll Awards	Top Ten International Gold Songs	Won	

Music program awards
Program	Date	Ref.
Music Bank	October 3, 2008	
Music Bank	October 10, 2008	
Music Bank	October 17, 2008	
Music Bank	October 24, 2008	

== Track listing ==
Digital single – US

1. "Nobody" — 3:34

Nobody (Sing-Along Version) – US

1. "Nobody (English version)" — 3:34
2. "Nobody (Karaoke Version)" — 3:34
3. "Nobody (Instrumental Remastered)" — 3:36

Nobody (The Remix Edition) – US

1. "Nobody" (Jason Nevins Remix) — 3:32
2. "Nobody" (Jason Nevins Extended Remix) — 5:50
3. "Nobody" (Jason Nevins Remix) [Instrumental] — 3:32
4. "Nobody" (Jason Nevins Extended Remix) [Instrumental] — 5:50

== Credits and personnel ==
Recording

- Recorded at JYPE Studio, Gangnam-gu, Seoul – Korean version
- Recorded at JYP Manhattan Studio, New York City – English version
- Mastered at Bernie Grundman Mastering, Los Angeles

Personnel

- Wonder Girls – vocals
- Park Jin-young – lyricist, composer, arranger
- Rhee Woo-seok (Rainstone) – composer
- Ho Yoon Moon – recording engineer
- Jun Soo Noh – recording assistant
- Brian Stanley – mixer
- Bernie Grundman – mastering engineer

== Charts ==
=== Weekly charts ===
Chart (2009–2011)	Peak position
Canada Singles (Nielsen SoundScan)	4
US Billboard Hot 100	76
US Dance Single Sales (Billboard)	1
US Heatseekers Songs (Billboard)	4

=== Year-end charts ===
Chart (2009)	Position
US Hot Single Sales (Billboard)	1

== Release history ==
Region	Date	Version	Format	Label	Ref.
South Korea	September 22, 2008	Korean	Digital download; streaming	JYP Entertainment	
United States	June 26, 2009	English digital single	Digital download; streaming	JYP Entertainment	
United States	October 11, 2009	Sing-Along Version	CD; digital download	JYP Entertainment	
United States	October 30, 2009	The Remix Edition	Digital download	JYP Entertainment	

== See also ==
- List of best-selling singles in South Korea
