= Terence Siufay =

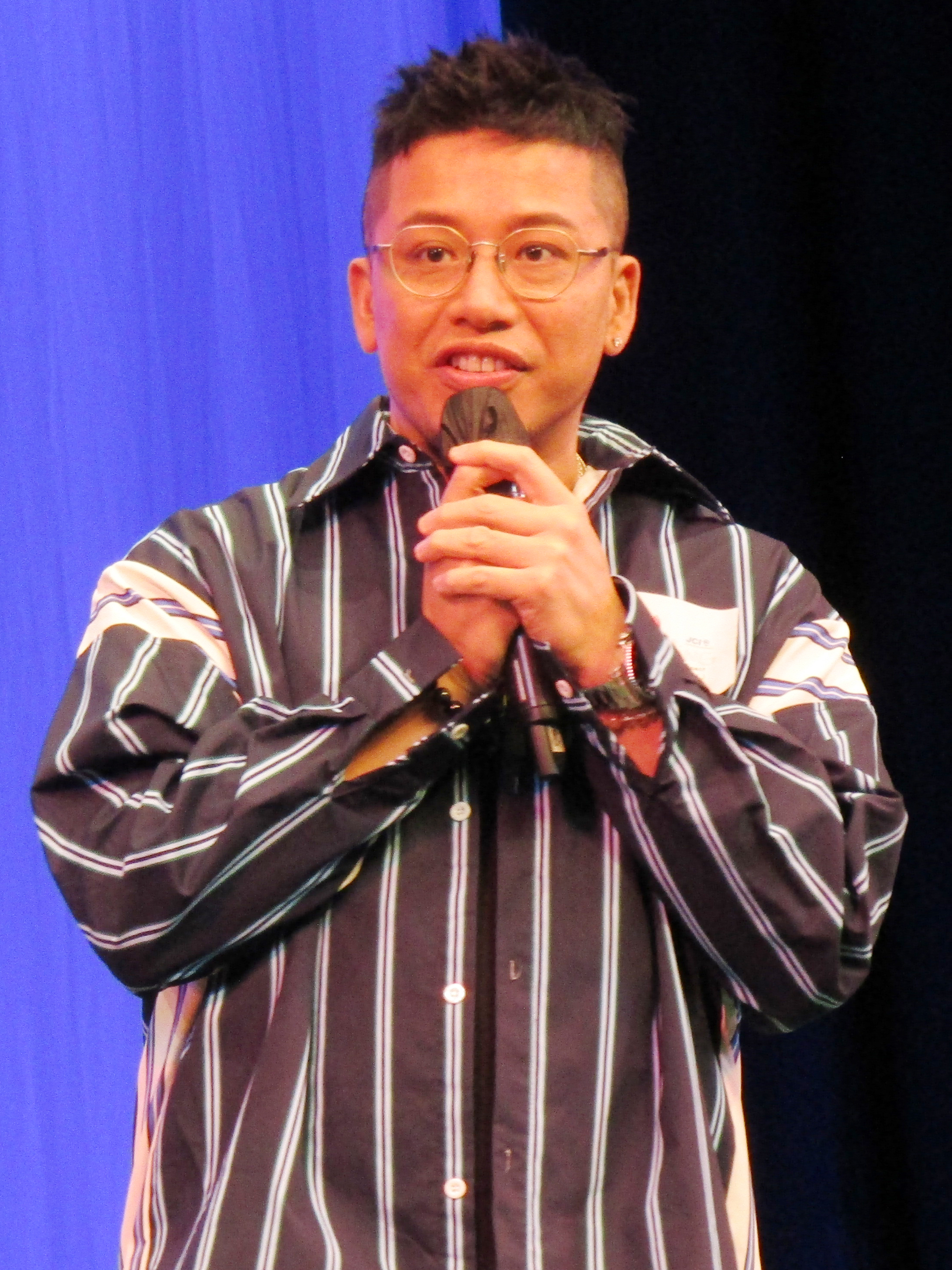
- Terence Siufay in 2022.
- Born: 徐智勇; 13 June 1976 (age 50); Portuguese Macau (ancestral hometown: Kaiping City(開平市), Guangdong province
- Occupations: Singer, actor
- Years active: 2007–present

Chinese name
Transcriptions
Standard Mandarin
- Hanyu Pinyin: xu zhi yong
Yue: Cantonese
- Jyutping: chui zhi yong
- Musical career
- Origin: Macau
- Genres: Cantopop
- Label: Gold Label Record
- Website: www.siufay.com

Terence Siufay (born 13 July 1976, in Macau) is a Macau singer and actor. who has been with the group C-Plus for the past 10 years in Macau. In 2007, he joined Gold Typhoon in Hong Kong. He got the new male singer bronze award from JSG 07 and won the silver award for the song "逼得寵物太緊" with Kary Ng.

He came out as a gay man in 2020, after many years of speculation and living in fear in an interview on Stephen Chan Chi-wan's YouTube talk show.

== Discography ==
=== Studio albums ===
- The First Album Of Siufay (2007)
- Festival Traveler (2009)
- Sunset Concert (2011)
- The first album of Siufay (2007)
- "宠物"
- "逼得宠物太紧"
- "有情有义"
- "时光机"
- "Sin City"
- "不平安夜"

== Filmography ==
- See You in You Tube <愛‧鬥大>
- Forgive and Forget <親愛的>
- The Vampire Who Admires Me <有隻僵屍暗戀你>
- <我系香港人>
- No One's Perfect <絕代雙嬌>
- In Progress!! <In Progress!! 玩大咗>
- True Women for Sale <我不賣身‧我賣子宮>
- Summer Love (2011)
- Project Entropy (2012)
- Love Lifting (2012)
- Conspirators (2013)
- Out of Inferno (2013)
- SFC 3 (2015)
- Guia in Love (2015)
- From Vegas to Macau III (2016)
- Good Take! (2016)
- Special Female Force (2016)
- Sisterhood (2017)
- 77 Heartbreaks (2017)
- Always Be with You (2017)
- A Beautiful Moment (2018)
