= Ahn So-hee =

South Korean actress (born 1992)

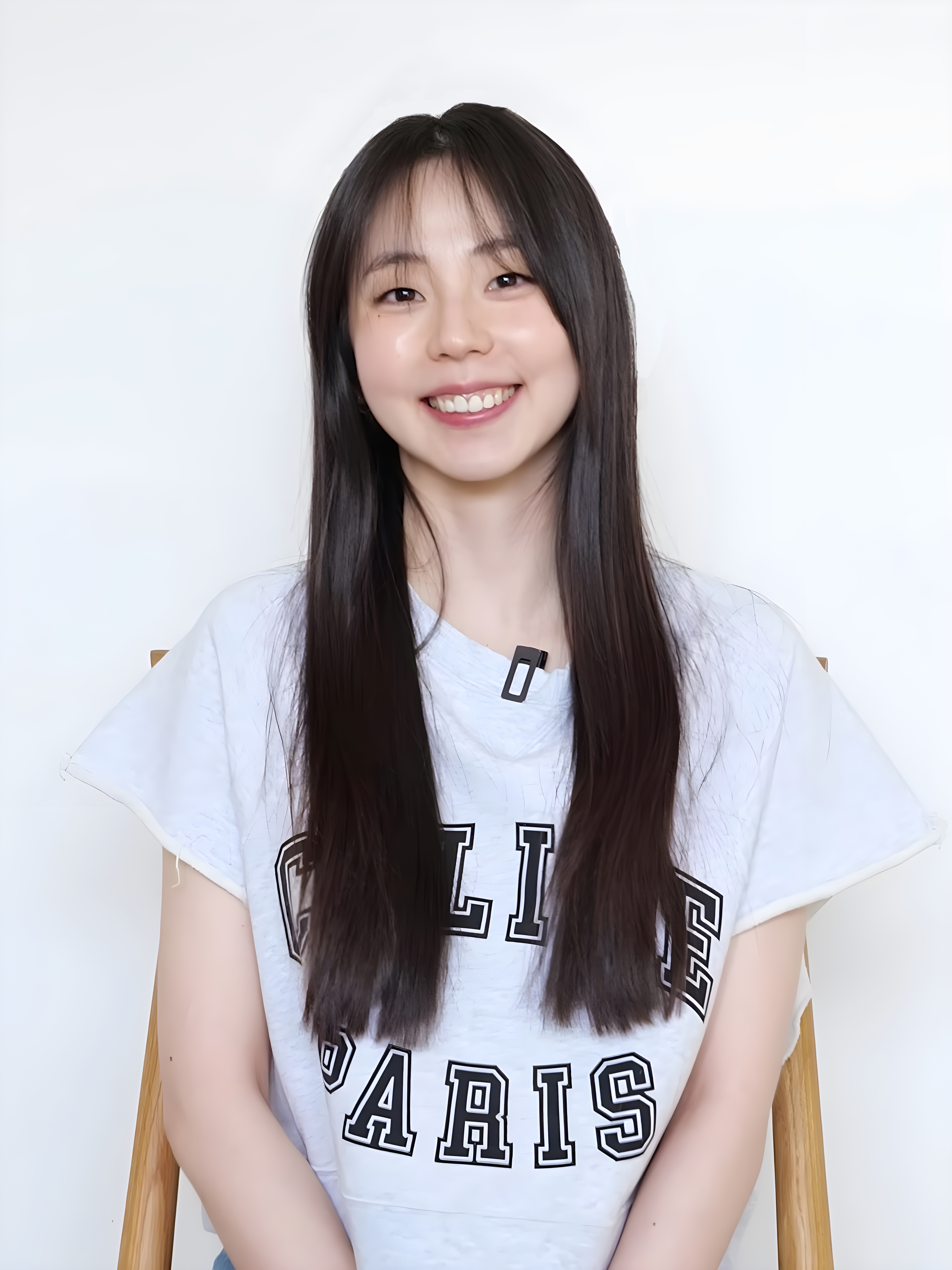
- Ahn in 2022
- Born: June 27, 1992 (age 34); Seoul, South Korea
- Occupations: Actress; singer
- Years active: 2004–present
- Agent: BH Entertainment
- Musical career
- Genre: K-pop
- Instrument: Vocals
- Years active: 2007–2013
- Label: JYP
- Formerly of: Wonder Girls; JYP Nation

Korean name
- Hangul: 안소희
- Hanja: 安昭熙
- RR: An Sohui
- MR: An Sohŭi
- Website: bhent.co.kr

Ahn So-hee (Korean: 안소희; born June 27, 1992), known mononymously as Sohee, is a South Korean actress and former singer. She is a former member of the South Korean girl group Wonder Girls. She is best known for her performance in the film Train to Busan (2016).

== Early life ==
Ahn So-hee was born on June 27, 1992, in South Korea. She was selected through auditions and, at the age of 12, she became a JYP Entertainment (JYPE) trainee.

== Career ==
=== 2004: Acting debut ===
Ahn made her acting debut in 2004 at the age of 12 with a minor role in Yu Dae-eol's short film The Synesthesia for Overtone Construction, in which Ahn portrayed a deaf girl.

=== 2007–2012: Debut with Wonder Girls and acting career ===
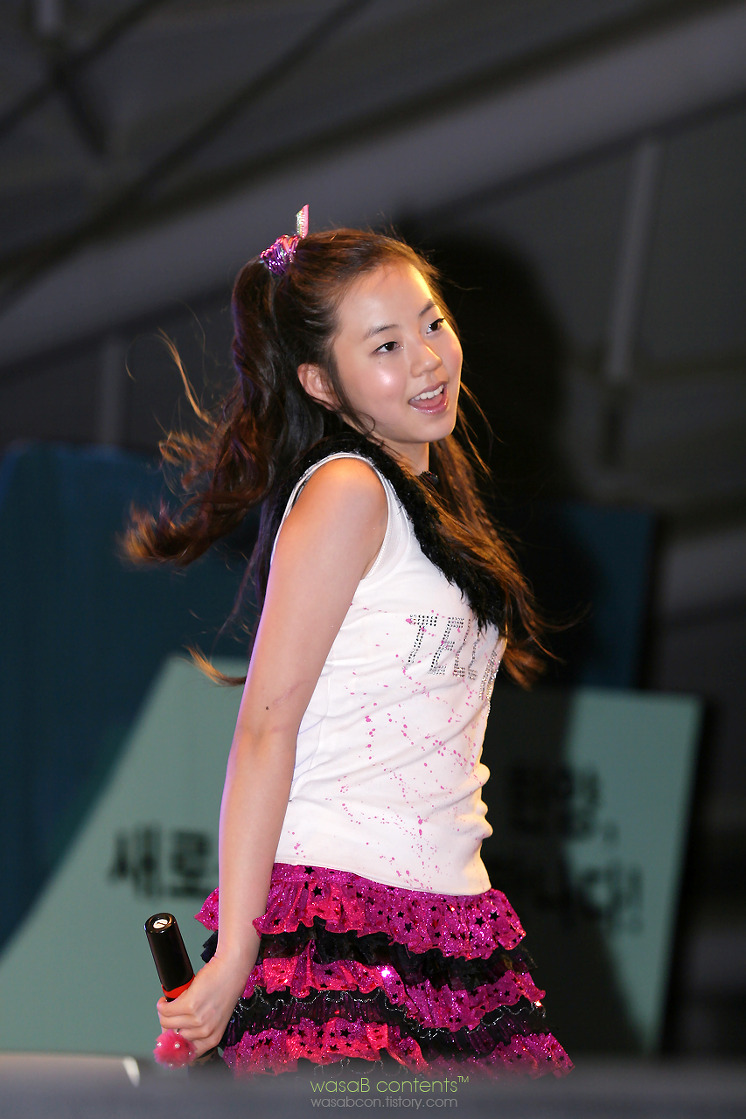
Ahn performing at a university festival in 2007

In 2007, she was revealed as a third member of Wonder Girls, a girl group managed by JYP Entertainment, after two years of training. The group debuted with the single "Irony", featuring Sohee as a dancer and vocalist with the group. The group quickly rose to stardom with their hits "Tell Me", "So Hot" and "Nobody" in less than two years from their debut. Ahn was nicknamed "Nation's Little Sister" by the media.

In early 2008, Ahn made her big screen debut alongside Lee Mi-sook and Kim Min-hee in the romantic comedy Hellcats, directed by Kwon Chil-in of Singles. The film is adapted from the popular Korean comic 10, 20 and 30, and is about the views of modern Korean women towards love and life.

=== 2013–2015: Leading role and quitting Wonder Girls ===
In 2013, Ahn landed her first leading role in Happy! Rose Day alongside Jung Woong-in, a drama about a girl in her early 20s who works at a flower shop.

Ahn's career with JYPE and Wonder Girls came to an end in December 2013, when her contract with the company expired and she decided not to renew.

In 2014, Ahn signed a contract with the management agency BH Entertainment. The same year, she starred in tvN's romantic comedy series Heart to Heart, playing an aspiring actress.

In September 2015, Ahn's contract with BH Entertainment expired and she later signed with KeyEast.

=== 2016–present: Resurgence and return to acting ===
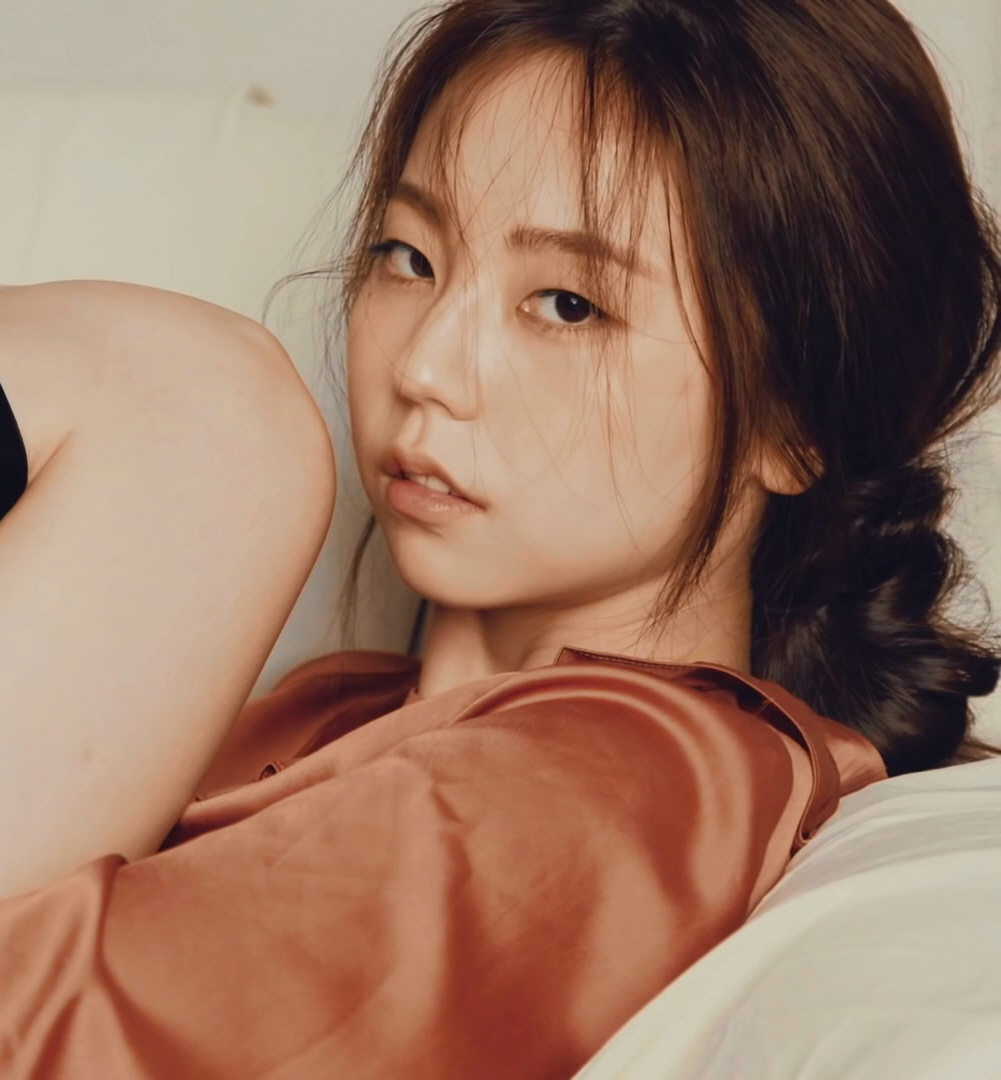
Ahn for Marie Claire Korea in 2016

In 2016, she starred in South Korea's first zombie movie, Train to Busan, playing a high school student and a loyal supporter of the baseball team. The film premiered in the Midnight Screenings section at the 2016 Cannes Film Festival on May 13, 2016, and later surpassed 11 million admissions. Later that year, she featured in tvN's Korean remake of the American series Entourage, playing the love interest of Seo Kang-joon's character.

In 2017, Ahn starred in the thriller A Single Rider alongside Lee Byung-hun and Gong Hyo-jin, where she received praise for her portrayal of a solitary teenager.

In 2018, Ahn acted as Anu, who is a lively and assertive Mongolian woman with Yeon Woo-jin as Hyuga, a pure-hearted Mongolian man on the short movie Anu and Hyuga, also known as Mongolian Love Story.

In 2019, Ahn was cast as one of the female lead roles in Welcome to Waikiki 2. In July 2019, she starred in a short film Memories, playing as a mysterious woman.

In 2022, Ahn starred in the drama Thirty-Nine as Kim So-won, younger sister of Kim Seon-woo and a pianist.

== Filmography ==
=== Film ===
Year	Title	Role	Notes	Ref.
2004	The Synesthesia for Overtone Construction	Deaf girl	Short film	
2008	Hellcats	Kim Kang-ae		
2013	Mr. Go	Opening pitcher	Scene was deleted and released in DVD	
2015	C'est si bon	Cameo		
2016	Train to Busan	Jin-hee		
2017	A Single Rider	Ji-na		
2017	Real	Chinatown sewing room worker	Cameo	
2018	Anu and Hyuga	Anu	Short film	
2019	Memories	Mysterious Woman	Short film	
2022	The Night When the Moon Sets	Yongsan		
2024	The Daechi Scandal	Yoon-im		

=== Television series ===
Year	Title	Role	Notes	Ref.
2008	Here He Comes	Mal-hee	Cameo	
2012	Wonder Girls	Sohee		
2013	Happy! Rose Day	Ah-reum		
2015	Heart to Heart	Go Se-ro		
2016	Entourage	Ahn So-hee		
2019	Welcome to Waikiki 2	Kim Jung-eun		
2020–2023	Missing: The Other Side	Lee Jong-ah	Season 1–2	
2021	Drama Stage	Yoo Ha-na	Episode: "Attention Hog"	
2021	Dramaworld 2		Cameo	
2022	Thirty-Nine	Kim So-won		

=== Hosting ===
Year	Title	Notes	Ref.
2007–2008	Show! Music Core	April 14, 2007, and November 10, 2007 – April 26, 2008	

== Theatre ==
Theater play performances
Year	Title	Role	Theater	Date	Ref.
2024	Closer (클로저)	Alice	Plus Theater	April 23 to July 14	
2024	Secret of the Flower	Monica	Link Art Center's Bugs Hall	February 8 to May 11	

== Awards and nominations ==
Name of the award ceremony, year presented, category, nominee of the award, and the result of the nomination
Award ceremony	Year	Category	Nominee / Work	Result	Ref.
Buil Film Awards	2008	Best New Actress	Hellcats	Nominated	
Jecheon International Music & Film Festival	2017	JIMFF Star Award	A Single Rider	Won	
Mnet 20's Choice Awards	2008	Hot School Girl	Ahn So-hee	Won	
