= So Hot =

2008 song by Wonder Girls

Single by Wonder Girls
- B-side: "This Time"; "You're Out"
- Released: May 22, 2008
- Recorded: 2008
- Studio: JYPE Studio (Seoul)
- Genre: K-pop; dance
- Length: 3:03
- Label: JYP
- Lyricist: Park Jin-young
- Producers: Hong Ji-sang; Park Jin-young

Wonder Girls singles chronology
"Tell Me" (2007)	"So Hot" (2008)	"Nobody" (2008)

Music video
- "So Hot" on YouTube

"So Hot" is a song recorded by South Korean girl group Wonder Girls. It was initially released on May 22, 2008, for digital download. Afterwards, the single album titled "So Hot (The 3rd Project)" was released on June 3, 2008. The single became an instant hit and quickly hit number one on various South Korean charts, as well as topping Melon's weekly popular song chart for four consecutive weeks.

== Background ==
In order to promote the single, JYP Entertainment first released teaser pictures of each member in May 2008, showing the Wonder Girls in their new "sexy image". Starting with Yeeun, pictures were released on 5 consecutive days, ending with Sohee's pictures. Following the pictures, "So Hot" was previewed on their website. During this time, there were rumours that past member Hyuna would be returning to the group; JYP Entertainment confirmed that this was not the case. Performance and album cover outfits were inspired by Nicole Scherzinger’s looks in the Don’t Cha music video, with leopard print being the key focal point.

== Release and versions ==
"So Hot" was first given a digital release on May 22, 2008; the song topped online charts in the next few days. The full single album was released on June 3, 2008, given the subtitle The 3rd Project. In addition to the title track, the single album also contains the rap version of "Tell Me" and the new tracks "This Time" and "You're Out".

"So Hot" was initially planned to be the third English single for the group in the United States, after "Tell Me". Neither "So Hot" nor "Tell Me" were released as singles in the United States, but English versions of the songs were featured on their second extended play 2 Different Tears which was released on May 15, 2010. A new version of the song was included on the Japanese release Wonder Best (2012) and features the band's third line-up consisting of Hyerim, with Sunmi's vocals removed.

== Composition ==
"So Hot" is a dance song that incorporate retro analog instruments and a "playful" rock n roll, with lyrics about "a 21st-century princess soldier." Member Sunye described the song as "a song with a trendy and future-oriented concept". Model Irene Kim came up with the leopard print concept of the song while interning at JYP.

== Music video and promotion ==
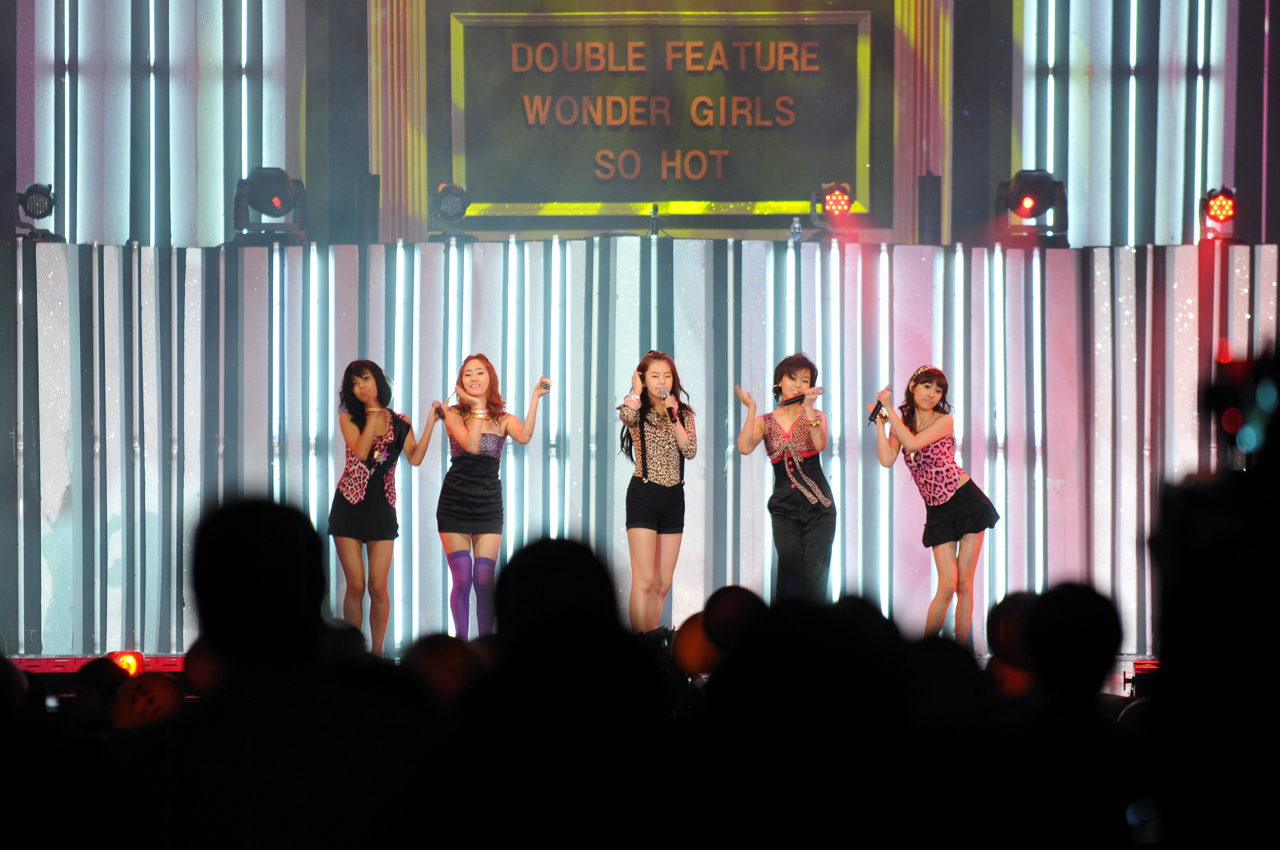
Wonder Girls performing "So Hot" on June 9, 2008.

A music video was produced for the song, showing the girls in various situations, with men instantly falling in love with them. The Wonder Girls began their comeback performances on May 31, 2008, on MBC's Show! Music Core, performing "So Hot" and "This Time". The members sported a brand new mature look, wearing leopard print outfits; future performances showcased varying outfits based around the print. The song became an instant hit and was the number one song on MBC's show Music Core and on SBS's Inkigayo for three consecutive weeks. Due to vocal chord problems, Kim Yubin lipsynced her parts, as per her doctor's orders, until the end of July 2008.

== Reception ==
The physical single album peaked at number three on South Korea's monthly album chart, with 31,840 copies sold. By September 2008, sales had reached 49,499 copies. (Note: Prior to the establishment of the Gaon Chart in 2010, previous data was compiled by the Music Industry Association Korea until it disbanded in 2008.) Additionally, the song won eleven first-place trophies on South Korean music programs and was awarded Song of the Year at the Melon Music Awards.

Awards and nominations
Year	Organization	Award	Result	Ref.
2008	Cyworld Digital Music Awards	Song of the Month (June)	Won	
2008	Golden Disc Awards	Digital Bonsang	Nominated	
2008	Golden Disc Awards	Popularity Award	Nominated	
2008	Melon Music Awards	Song of the Year	Won	
2008	Mnet 20's Choice Awards	Hot Club Music	Won	

Music program awards (11 total)
Program	Date	Ref.
Music Bank	June 6, 2008	
Music Bank	June 13, 2008	
Music Bank	June 20, 2008	
Music Bank	June 27, 2008	
Music Bank	July 11, 2008	
Inkigayo	June 15, 2008	
Inkigayo	June 22, 2008	
Inkigayo	June 29, 2008	
M Countdown	July 10, 2008	
M Countdown	July 17, 2008	
M Countdown	July 24, 2008	

== Track listing ==
CD single
No.	Title	Writer(s)	Producer(s)	Length
1.	"So Hot"	Park Jin-young	Park Jin-young; Hong Ji-sang	3:03
2.	"This Time"	Hong Ji-sang	Hong Ji-sang	4:38
3.	"You're Out"	Park Jin-young; Hong Ji-sang	Park Jin-young; Hong Ji-sang	3:12
4.	"Tell Me" (rap version)	Park Jin-young; Kim Yu-bin; Mitchell John Dixon	Park Jin-young; Dixon; Rhee Whoo-seok "Rainstone"	3:37
Total length:				14:36

== Charts ==
=== Monthly charts ===
Chart (2008)	Peak position
South Korean Albums (MIAK)	3

== Release history ==
Release history for "So Hot"
Region	Date	Format	Label
South Korea	May 22, 2008	Digital download	JYP Entertainment
South Korea	June 3, 2008	CD single	JYP Entertainment

== Blackpink version ==
"So Hot (The Black Label Remix)"

Song by Blackpink
- Language: Korean; English
- Released: December 25, 2017
- Genre: Dance; pop-rap
- Length: 2:20
- Label: The Black Label
- Lyricists: Park Jin-young; Teddy; 24; Danny Chung
- Producers: Hong Ji-sang; Park Jin-young; 24; Teddy; Danny Chung

Audio video
- "So Hot (The Black Label Remix)" on YouTube

South Korean girl group Blackpink released a version of the song titled "So Hot (The Black Label Remix)" on December 25, 2017. It was produced by 24, Teddy, and Danny Chung.

=== Background and release ===
On December 20, 2017, it was announced that Blackpink would perform "So Hot" at 2017 SBS Gayo Daejeon held at Gocheok Dome in Seoul on the 25th, as a Christmas present for the group's fans. The song was released on YouTube and SoundCloud on the same day of the performance. In September 2018, the song was released on Spotify and KKBox.

Blackpink performed "So Hot" on their first two concert tours, the Blackpink Arena Tour 2018 and the In Your Area World Tour. A performance of the song from the former tour was included in their first live album, Blackpink Arena Tour 2018 "Special Final in Kyocera Dome Osaka".

=== Composition ===
Blackpink's version of “So Hot”, parenthesized as "The Black Label Remix", was produced and arranged by 24, Teddy, and Danny Chung of The Black Label. It was described as having stylistic elements of hip hop and electronic music. The song contains a new English rap verse performed by Jennie and Lisa, in which they boast about their fame and status.
