= Wonder Girls discography =

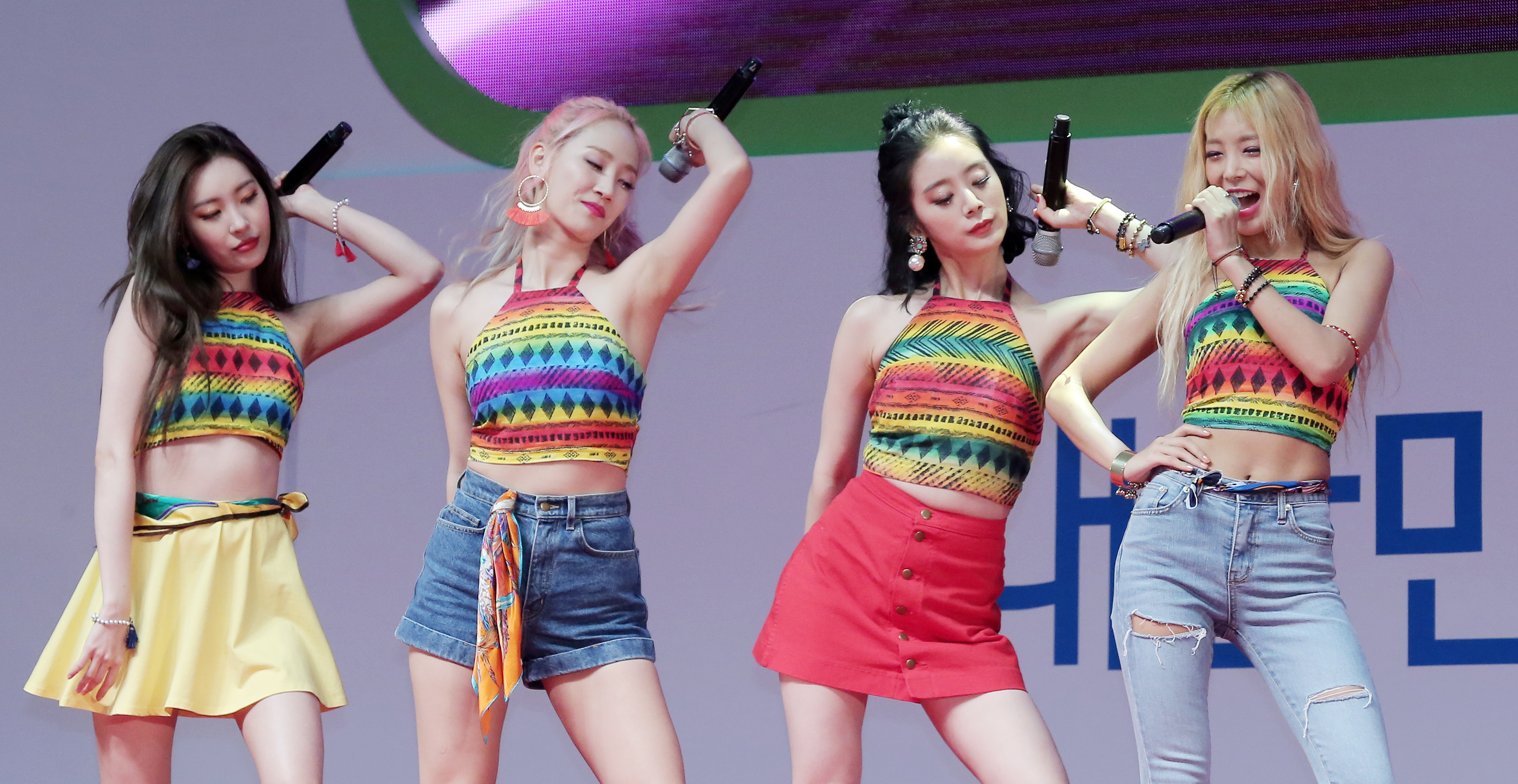
- Wonder Girls in July 2016
- Studio albums: 3
- Extended plays: 4
- Single albums: 1
- Compilation albums: 2
- Singles: 18
- Music videos: 14

The discography of South Korean girl group Wonder Girls consists of three studio albums, four extended plays, one single album, two greatest hits albums and eighteen singles.

== Albums ==
=== Studio albums ===
List of studio albums, with selected details, chart positions, and sales
Title	Album details	Peak chart positions				Sales
Title	Album details	KOR	JPN	US Heat	US World	Sales
The Wonder Years	Released: September 13, 2007 (KOR); Label: JYP Entertainment; Format: CD, digital download	— (Note: Circle charts were officially launched in 2010. It peaked at number 4 on the January 2008 MIAK monthly album chart.)	—	—	—	KOR: 83,391
Wonder World	Released: November 7, 2011 (KOR); Label: JYP Entertainment; Format: CD, digital download	1	154	—	5	KOR: 41,262; JPN: 929
Reboot	Released: August 3, 2015 (KOR); Label: JYP Entertainment; Format: CD, digital download	5	—	25	2	KOR: 12,789
"—" denotes releases that did not chart or were not released in that region.

=== Compilation albums ===
List of compilation albums, with selected details, chart positions
Title	Album details	Peak chart positions		Sales
Title	Album details	JPN	JPN Sales	Sales
Wonder Girls Taiwan Special Edition	Released: February 10, 2010 (TWN); Label: JYP Entertainment; Format: CD/DVD, digital download; Track listing: 1. Irony; 2. I Wanna; 3. A Sorry Heart; 4. Fool; 5. Tell Me (rap ver.); 6. Headache; 7. Take It; 8. Good Bye; 9. So Hot; 10. This Time; 11. Nobody; 12. I Tried; 13. Saying I Love You; 14. Tell Me (Chinese ver.); 15. So Hot (Chinese ver.); 16. Nobody (Chinese ver.)	—	—	TWN: 50,000
Wonder Best Korea / USA / Japan 2007–2012	Released: November 14, 2012 (JPN); Label: DefStar Records; Format: CD/DVD, digital download; Track listing Disc 1 - Korean language songs: 1. Irony (2012 ver.); 2. Tell Me (rap ver.) (2012 ver.); 3. So Hot (2012 ver.); 4. Nobody (2012 ver.); 5. 2 Different Tears; 6. G.N.O; 7. Be My Baby; 8. Girls Girls; 9. Me, in 10. R.E.A.L; 11. Like This; 12. Saying I Love You (2012 ver.); Disc 2: 1. Wonder Love (Japanese ver.); 2. Be My Baby (Japanese ver.); 3. Nobody (Japanese ver.); 4. Tell Me (2012 English ver.); 5. So Hot (2012 English ver.); 6. Nobody (2012 English ver.); 7. 2 Different Tears (English ver.); 8. Nu Shoes; 9. The DJ Is Mine; 10. Like Money ft. Akon; 11. Be My Baby (Ra.D Mix) bonus track 12. 2 Different Tears (remix) bonus track	32	30	
"—" denotes releases that did not chart or were not released in that region.

== Single albums ==
List of single albums, with selected details, chart positions, and sales
Title	Album details	Peak chart positions	Sales
Title	Album details	KOR	Sales
The Wonder Begins	Released: February 13, 2007; Label: JYP Entertainment; Format: CD, digital download	— (Note: Circle charts were officially launched in 2010. It charted at number 17 on the monthly MIAK album chart in February 2007.)	KOR: 14,815
So Hot	Released: June 3, 2008; Label: JYP Entertainment; Format: CD, digital download	— (Note: Circle charts were officially launched in 2010. It charted at number 3 on the monthly MIAK album chart in June 2008.)	KOR: 57,000
Why So Lonely	Released: July 5, 2016; Label: JYP Entertainment; Format: CD, digital download	3	KOR: 13,240
"—" denotes releases that did not chart or were not released in that region.

== Extended plays ==
=== Korean extended plays ===
List of extended plays, with selected details, chart positions, and sales
Title	Album details	Peak chart positions				Sales
Title	Album details	KOR	JPN	US Heat	US World	Sales
The Wonder Years: Trilogy	Released: September 30, 2008 (KOR); Label: JYP Entertainment; Format: CD, digital download	14	—	—	—	KOR: 84,535
2 Different Tears	Released: May 15, 2010 (KOR); Label: JYP Entertainment; Format: CD, digital download	2	—	21	ー	KOR: 31,775
Wonder Party	Released: June 3, 2012 (KOR); Label: JYP Entertainment; Format: CD, digital download	3	140	—	9	KOR: 27,201; JPN: 1,363
"—" denotes releases that did not chart or were not released in that region.

=== Japanese extended plays ===
List of extended plays, with selected details, chart positions, and sales
Title	Album details	Peak chart positions		Sales
Title	Album details	JPN	JPN Sales	Sales
Nobody for Everybody	Released: July 25, 2012 (JPN); Label: DefStar Records; Format: CD, digital download	14	13	JPN: 10,731
"—" denotes releases that did not chart or were not released in that region.

== Singles ==
=== Korean singles ===
List of Wonder Girls singles released in Korean
Title	Year	Peak chart positions			Sales (Note: Korea sale is a digital sales only by Gaon Music Chart)	Album
Title	Year	KOR (Note: The Gaon Digital Chart was first published in 2010.)	KOR Hot	US World	Sales	Album
"Irony"	2007	—	—	—		The Wonder Begins
"Tell Me"	2007	—	—	—		The Wonder Years
"This Fool" (이 바보)	2007	—	—	—		The Wonder Years
"So Hot"	2008	—	—	—		So Hot
"Nobody"	2008	—	—	—	KOR: 4,600,000	The Wonder Years: Trilogy
"2 Different Tears"	2010	1	—	—	KOR: 2,790,000	2 Different Tears
"Be My Baby"	2011	1	1	2	KOR: 3,920,000	Wonder World
"Like This"	2012	2	1	4	KOR: 2,320,000	Wonder Party
"I Feel You"	2015	3	—	12	KOR: 842,000	Reboot
"Why So Lonely"	2016	1	—	5	KOR: 1,124,000	Why So Lonely
"Draw Me" (그려줘)	2017	32	—	—	KOR: 82,000	Non-album single
"—" denotes releases that did not chart or were not released in that region.

=== English singles ===
List of Wonder Girls singles released in English
Title	Year	Peak chart positions						Sales	Album
Title	Year	KOR (Note: The Gaon Digital Chart was first published in 2010.)	KOR Hot	CAN Niel.	US	US Heat	US World	Sales	Album
"Nobody"	2009	—	—	4	76	4	—	US: 78,000; US: 42,000 (phy.)	Non-album single
"2 Different Tears"	2010	—	—	6	—	—	—		2 Different Tears
"The DJ Is Mine" (solo or featuring School Gyrls)	2012	8	9	—	—	—	—	KOR: 1,173,000	Wonder Party
"Like Money" (featuring Akon)	2012	11	14	—	—	—	—	KOR: 469,000	Non-album single
"—" denotes releases that did not chart or were not released in that region.

=== Promotional singles ===
Title	Year	Peak chart positions		Sales	Album
Title	Year	KOR	US World	Sales	Album
"Joyo Joyo" (쪼요쪼요)	2007	—	—	—N/a	Non-album singles
"Army Song"	2008	—	—	—N/a	Non-album singles
"Food Song"	2008	—	—	—N/a	Non-album singles
"Anybody" (featuring Dynamic Duo, San E and J.Y. Park)	2008	—	—	—N/a	Non-album singles
"Now" (Fin.K.L cover)	2009	—	—	—N/a	Non-album singles
"K-Food Party"	2011	—	—	—N/a	Non-album singles
"To the Beautiful You" (아름다운 그대에게)	2016	30	16	KOR: 135,163	Why So Lonely
"—" denotes releases that did not chart or were not released in that region.

== Other charted songs ==
Title	Year	Peak chart positions			Sales	Album
Title	Year	KOR	KOR Hot	US World	Sales	Album
"2 Different Tears (Remix)"	2010	111	—	—	—N/a	2 Different Tears
"G.N.O."	2011	11	21	—	KOR: 1,233,140	Wonder World
"Girls Girls"	2011	10	18	—	KOR: 1,108,552	Wonder World
"Me, In"	2011	7	17	—	KOR: 998,940	Wonder World
"Sweet Dreams"	2011	20	67	—	KOR: 386,986	Wonder World
"Stop!"	2011	17	49	—	KOR: 520,428	Wonder World
"Dear Boy"	2011	24	74	—	KOR: 354,281	Wonder World
"Do Go Do Go"	2011	21	73	—	KOR: 358,018	Wonder World
"SuperB"	2011	28	92	—	KOR: 282,583	Wonder World
"Act Cool" (featuring San E)	2011	18	47	—	KOR: 541,318	Wonder World
"Be My Baby" (Ra.D Mix)	2011	37	88	—	KOR: 263,641	Wonder World
"Nu Shoes"	2011	25	71	—	KOR: 347,760	Wonder World
"R.E.A.L."	2012	12	37	—	KOR: 376,564	Wonder Party
"Hey Boy"	2012	16	40	—	KOR: 335,039	Wonder Party
"Girlfriend"	2012	8	22	—	KOR: 758,905	Wonder Party
"Sorry"	2012	14	38	—	KOR: 345,448	Wonder Party
"Baby Don't Play"	2015	55	—	—	KOR: 59,616	Reboot
"Candle" (featuring Paloalto)	2015	69	—	—	KOR: 47,080	Reboot
"Rewind"	2015	93	—	—	KOR: 39,501	Reboot
"Loved"	2015	— (Note: "Loved" peaked at number 101 on the domestic Gaon Digital Chart.)	—	—	KOR: 27,814	Reboot
"John Doe"	2015	92	—	—	KOR: 34,804	Reboot
"One Black Night"	2015	94	—	—	KOR: 34,018	Reboot
"Back"	2015	— (Note: "Back" peaked at number 100 on the domestic Gaon Digital Chart.)	—	—	KOR: 31,372	Reboot
"Oppa"	2015	— (Note: "Oppa" peaked at number 98 on the domestic Gaon Digital Chart.)	—	—	KOR: 32,362	Reboot
"Faded Love"	2015	96	—	—	KOR: 34,984	Reboot
"Gone"	2015	— (Note: "Gone" peaked at number 115 on the domestic Gaon Digital Chart.)	—	—	KOR: 23,810	Reboot
"Remember"	2015	— (Note: "Remember" peaked at number 108 on the domestic Gaon Digital Chart.)	—	—	KOR: 25,651	Reboot
"Sweet & Easy"	2016	41	—	17	KOR: 90,022	"Why So Lonely"
"—" denotes releases that did not chart or were not released in that region.

== Unreleased songs ==
- "Ouch"
- "Stay Together"
- "Wake Up"

== Other appearances ==
Year	Title	Album
2012	"Best Christmas Ever"	A Very Special Christmas: 25 Years Bringing Joy to the World

== Music videos ==
List of music videos, showing year released and director
Title	Year	Other version	Director(s)	Ref.
"Irony"	2007	—N/a	Jang Jae-hyeok	
"It's Not Love"	2007	—N/a	Nobuhiro Doi	
"Tell Me"	2007	—N/a	Lee Sang-kyu	
"This Fool"	2007	—N/a	Unknown	(Note: The video consists of footage from the South Korean film Hellcats and a live performance of the song.)
"Take It"	2008	—N/a	Jo Nam-don	
"Wishing on a Star"	2008	—N/a	Park Sang-min	
"So Hot"	2008	—N/a	Jang Jae-hyeok	
"This Time"	2008	—N/a	Kim Eui-yeon and Kim Kwang-eun	
"Nobody"	2008	English version	Jang Jae-hyeok	
"Now"	2009	Dance version	Lee Sang-yong	
"2 Different Tears"	2010	English version; Chinese version	Jang Jae-hyeok	
"K-Food Party"	2011	—N/a	Wooje Kim	
"Be My Baby"	2011	English version	Cho Soo-hyun	
"The DJ Is Mine"	2012	—N/a	Ethan Lander	
"Like This"	2012	—N/a	Jang Jae-hyeok	
"Nobody ～あなたしか見えない～"	2012	—N/a	Jang Jae-hyeok	
"Like Money"	2012	—N/a	Ethan Lander	
"I Feel You"	2015	—N/a	Choi Yong-seok (Lumpens)	
"Why So Lonely"	2016	—N/a	Choi Yong-seok (Lumpens)	
