= FreeStyle Street Basketball =

2004 video game

Freestyle Street Basketball
- Developer: JCEntertainment
- Publisher: JCEntertainment
- Engine: JCE's In-House Engine
- Platform: Microsoft Windows
- Release: KOR: 2004; NA: May 15, 2007
- Genres: Massively multiplayer, sports
- Mode: Multiplayer

FreeStyle Street Basketball (FSSB) is a 2004 massively multiplayer online sports game developed and published by JCEntertainment for Microsoft Windows. It is a fast-paced, arcade styled representation of half court streetball, self-described as being Hip-Hoop. Players team up with one another to challenge other online players to matches of basketball that are characterized by high tempo, freedom of movement, and a premium placed on synergy and teamwork. Players can also create clubs and enter club matches, play in a single player story mode, roam around in Open Court mode, drop and add skills as needed, and choose from millions of different outfits to express themselves due to the sheer quantity of wearable items in the in-game shop.

== Gameplay ==
All versions of the game offer half court 1 on 1, 2 on 2, and 3 on 3 play with other players online.

1 on 1 matches are set at 3 minutes, 2 on 2 matches at 4 minutes and 3 on 3 matches at 5 minutes.

Standard rules of streetball apply, with a shot clock and an overtime mechanism applied:

- Shots inside the 3 point arc are worth 2 points.
- Shots outside of the 3 point arc are worth 3 points.
- Players cannot dribble the ball after picking up their dribble.
- No out of bounds in play.
- No fouls.
- Ball has to be cleared outside of the three point line after a change of possession.
- 24 second shot clock.
- One-minute overtime periods if score is tied at the end of regulation, if score is tied after an overtime period, another overtime period is played until one team has more points than the other.
- Team with the most points at the end of regulation are the victors.

Three on three matches are five minutes long, and are unique in the fact that the game starts with a jump ball rather than the home side receiving the ball.

Two on two matches are four minutes long, while one on one matches are three minutes long. Both are different from three on three matches in the fact that the home side will always start with the ball.

Each player can equip their own skills, which are moves that can be activated by pressing the unique inputs needed and "FreeStyles", or modifiers of normal moves that all characters have that will either appear at random in the normal move's place, or takes its place in a set order.

Due to the arcade nature of the game, certain aspects of momentum and physics were ignored to encourage faster pace. As a result, an entirely different metagame rose from exploiting those deficits to pull off and defend against spectacular and illogical moves.

The game has an experience-based leveling system. When a player reaches a certain experience requirement, they will level up and be rewarded with Attribute points. Attribute points are used to improve the character's skills such as running, jumping, dribbling, stealing and passing.

During character creation, the three main positions are presented. They are the center (C), the Forward (F) and the Guard (G). This classification is from level 1 to 15 with different skills depending on player position. At level 15, Guards and Forwards further specialize their position by selecting between point guard/shooting guard and small forward/power forward, respectively. Upon position choice, the player is then prompted to choose the name, gender, face type, body type and height of their character. Position, gender and height are the only non-cosmetic factors of character creation. After the player's character is successfully created, the player is immediately taken to the game's basic tutorial.

== Record keeping ==
As is customary with the sport of basketball, FreeStyle Street Basketball offers an in depth record keeping system.

The following statistics are kept by the game when a player completes a 1 on 1 match in their league:

- 1 on 1 Win Points (+2 for every 1 on 1 match won)

The following statistics are kept by the game when a player completes a 2 on 2 or 3 on 3 match in their league:

- The character's win–loss record and win percentage
- Points scored
- Points per game (PPG)
- Rebounds grabbed
- Rebounds per game (RPG)
- Assists made
- Assists per game (APG)
- Steals converted
- Steals per game (SPG)
- Blocks converted
- Blocks per game (BPG)
- Points scored by converting 3-point shots
- Shooting percentage of 2-point shots
- Shooting percentage of 3-point shots
- Minutes played in match
- Man of the match awards (MVP/POG depending on the version, 3 on 3 only)

Monthly rankings are made for all of these aforementioned stats per league. Career stats are also kept for everything excluding averages and percentages, and as such a career ranking is in place as well.

The Man of the Match award is given to the most statistically impactful player on the winning side of a 3 on 3 match. The player with the highest (hidden) MotM points on the winning team receives the reward.

There is a special formula for MotM points:

Each point scored = 1

Each rebound collected = 2

Each assist made = 3

Each block converted = 4

Each steal converted = 5

Whoever finishes with the greatest number of MVP points wins the award.

In the event of a tie, the character that occupies the slot furthest left while in the team wins the award.

Because an impressive statline is usually required to win a Man of the Match award, it is popular to use these awards along with the win–loss record of the player to judge an unknown player's quality.

== In-game economy ==
FreeStyle uses a micropayment business model in which players can purchase the premium in-game currency varying in name to each server. Another currency, Points, is awarded after games.

Both are used to buy skills, freestyles, clothes, and various accessories, although there are certain items and skills that can only be bought by the premium currency. Some clothing items have an expiration date, and will disappear after the date.

== Special teams and characters ==
- Miami Phoenix (Miami, Florida, United States)
  - (United States) Alice Anderson (Guard, Captain)
  - (United States) Francis Cahill (Forward)
  - (United States) Howl Kachina (Center)
- Yokohama Choco Ships (Yokohama, Japan)
  - (Japan) Sachi Takenaka (Guard, Captain)
  - (Japan) Mikako Suzuki (Forward)
  - (Japan) Yoshino Saionji (Center)
- Wien Weiß Ritter (Vienna, Austria)
  - (Austria) Sigmund "Sig" von Schonberg (Guard, Captain)
  - (Austria) Ophelia (Forward)
  - Raymond (Center)
- Los Angeles Gold Bugs (Los Angeles, California, United States)
  - (United States) "Mantis" (Center, Captain)
  - (United States) "Spider" (Forward)
  - (United States) "Honey Bee" (Guard)
- Tokyo Fruit Basket (Tokyo, Japan)
  - (Japan) "Mikan"
  - (Japan) "Ringo"
  - (United States) "Ichigo" Ashley
- Rio Hot Carnival (Rio de Janeiro, Brazil)
  - (Mexico) García Lorenzo
  - (Brazil) Liza Silva
  - (Jamaica) Coco Marry
- (South Korea) Wonder Hup (Korea Republic), based on a Korean girl group "Wonder Girls"
  - (South Korea) Sohee
  - (South Korea) Sunye
  - (South Korea) Sunmi
  - (South Korea) Yeeun
  - (South Korea) Yubin
- KARA Cats (Korea Republic), based on a Korean girl group "KARA"
  - (South Korea) Goo Hara
  - (South Korea) Han Seungyeon
  - (South Korea) Kang Jiyoung
  - (South Korea) Nicole
  - (South Korea) Park Gyuri

== Reception ==
FreeStyle was rated 6.8 out of 10 by IGN. The enjoyable gameplay and cell-shaded graphics were highlighted, but criticisms included the lack of initial character customization options, frustrations with joining a game and the "marketed" urban style.

== Sequels ==
The sequels of this game are named FreeStyle Street Basketball 2 and FreeStyle 3on3. FreeStyle Street Basketball 2 had its closed beta by publisher Gamekiss from May 14-20 of 2014. The open beta for this sequel began the same year on June 20 and is currently in progress.

A Steam version of the game was also released on April 1, 2015.

The third installment of this series and direct sequel to FreeStyle Street Basketball 2 is 3on3 Freestyle. It was initially released in 2016 by Sony Interactive Entertainment exclusively for PlayStation 4 and build with Unreal Engine 4 game engine. It was later released on Steam on October 16, 2017 and published by JoyCity.
