= List of Wonder Girls concert tours =

Wonder Girls concerts
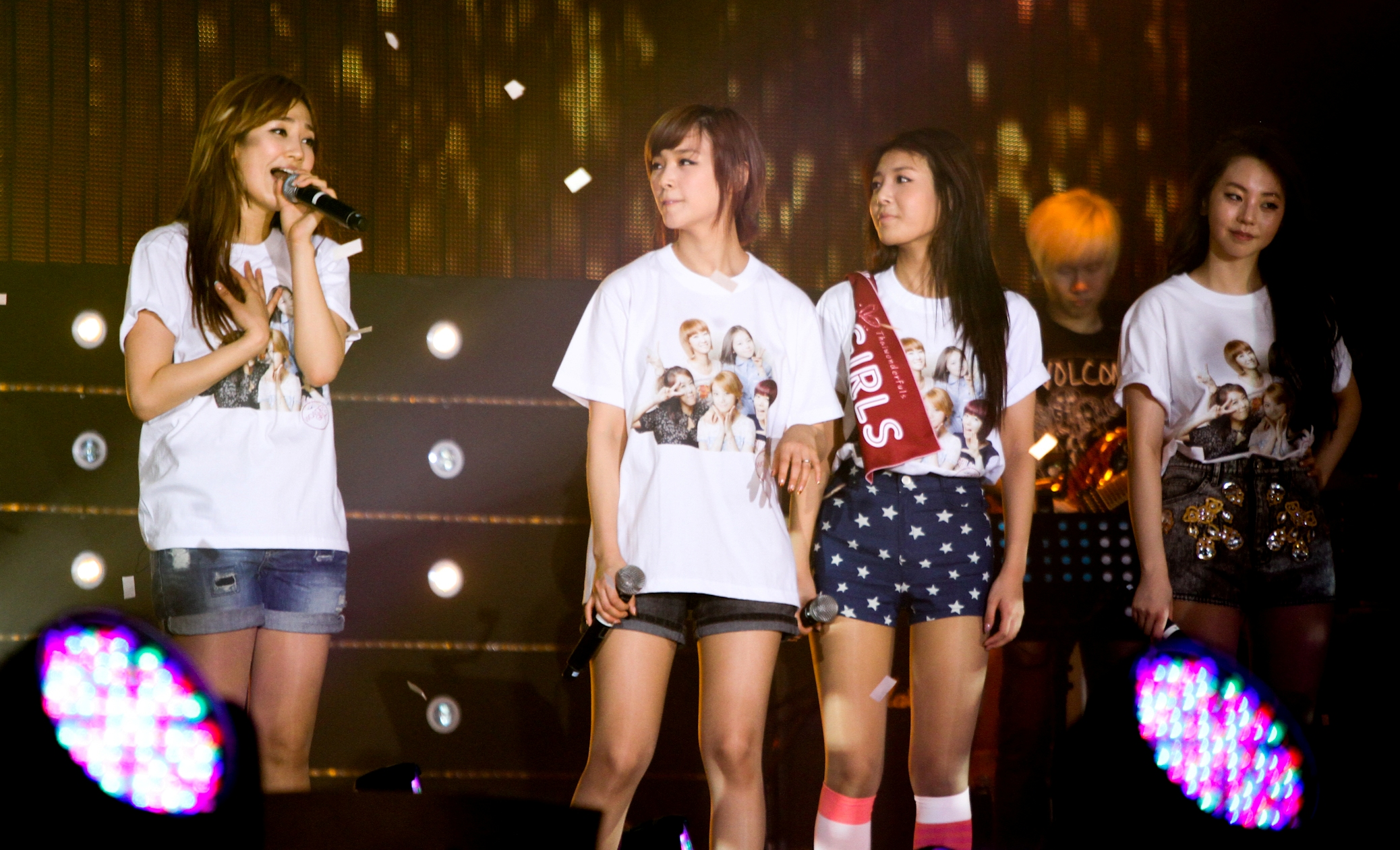
- Wonder Girls performing on their Wonder World Tour in Singapore in 2012
- Concert tours: 3
- Fan meetings: 4
- Affiliated concerts: 6

This is a list of concert tours of South Korean girl group Wonder Girls. The Wonder Girls World Tour marked the first time a K-pop girl group held a tour in North America, visiting various cities in the United States and Canada in June and July 2010. In addition to their solo concerts, Wonder Girls served as an opening act for the Jonas Brothers World Tour 2009.

== 1st Wonder Tour ==
1st Wonder Tour
- Tour by Wonder Girls
- Location: Asia
- Associated album: The Wonder Years
- Start date: February 28, 2009
- End date: December 17, 2010
- No. of shows: 6

Wonder Girls concert chronology
- 1st Wonder Tour (2009–10); Wonder Girls World Tour (2010)

The 1st Wonder Tour was the first concert tour by Wonder Girls. The concert tour started first in Bangkok, Thailand then Busan and Seoul in South Korea, Shanghai, China and Pahang, Malaysia. The 1st Wonder in South Korea is Wonder Girls' 1st domestic solo concert in Korea since their debut in 2007.

=== Tour dates ===
Date	City	Country	Venue	Attendance
February 28, 2009	Bangkok	Thailand	Indoor Stadium Huamark	7,000
March 21, 2009	Busan	South Korea	KBS Busan Hall	5,000
March 28, 2009	Seoul	South Korea	Olympic Fencing Arena	8,000
December 1, 2009	Shanghai	China	Shanghai Grand Stage	—
December 11, 2010	Genting Highlands	Malaysia	Arena of Stars	—
December 17, 2010	Hong Kong	China	AsiaWorld–Arena	7,000
Total				N/A

== Wonder Girls World Tour ==
Wonder Girls World Tour
- Promotional tour by Wonder Girls
- Location: North America
- Associated album: 2 Different Tears
- Start date: June 4, 2010
- End date: July 17, 2010
- Legs: 2
- No. of shows: 20

Wonder Girls concert chronology
- 1st Wonder Tour (2009–10); Wonder Girls World Tour (2010); Wonder World Tour (2012)

The Wonder Girls World Tour was a 20-show tour by the Wonder Girls that took place in the US and Canada. The tour showcased the English and Korean versions of their hits, covers of popular English-language songs, and new songs from their album 2 Different Tears.

The Wonder Girls' reception in North America was very positive. The Wonder Girls were named House of Blues "Artist of the Month" for June 2010 and many of their shows were sold out and packed full.

During the tour, Mnet released teasers for Wonder Girls' reality program called Made in Wonder Girls. Starting from June 28, fans were able to watch short clips of the Washington DC, New York, and Chicago concerts. Mnet continued showing short clips of the tour until July 22 with the next batch being about the "Behind the Story" of Wonder Girls and 2PM. Made in Wonder Girls started airing by Mnet on July 30, 2010.

Set lists

Set list for leg 1

2PM (opening act)

1. Without U
2. I Hate You
3. Heartbeat
4. Again & Again
5. 10 Out of 10

Wonder Girls

1. "I Wanna"
2. "Goodbye"
3. "Don't Cha"
4. "So Hot"
5. "Nobody" (Rainstone Remix)
6. "This Time"
7. "Lip Gloss" (solo by Lim)
8. "Boom Boom Pow" (solo by Yubin)
9. "Mercy" (solo by Yenny)
10. "Single Ladies (Put a Ring on It)" (solo by Sohee)
11. "Paparazzi" (solo by Sun)
12. "Survivor"
13. "Saying I Love You"
14. "Stickwitu"
15. "2 Different Tears"
16. "Tell Me"
  Encore
17. "Nobody"
Set list for leg 2

2AM (opening act)

1. "This Song"
2. "Confession of a Friend"
3. "Can't Let You Go Even If I Die"
4. "I Was Wrong"
5. "One Candle" (cover)

Wonder Girls

1. "I Wanna"
2. "Goodbye"
3. "Don't Cha"
4. "So Hot"
5. "Nobody" (Rainstone Remix)
6. "This Time"
7. "Lip Gloss" (solo by Lim)
8. "Boom Boom Pow" (solo by Yubin)
9. "Mercy" (solo by Yenny)
10. "Single Ladies (Put a Ring on It)" (solo by Sohee)
11. "Paparazzi" (solo by Sun)
12. "Saying I Love You"
13. "Stickwitu"
14. "2 Different Tears"
15. "Tell Me"
  Encore
16. "Nobody"

=== Tour dates ===
Date	City	Country	Venue	Opening act(s)
Leg 1
June 4, 2010	Washington, D.C.	United States	Warner Theatre	2PM
June 5, 2010	Atlanta	United States	The Tabernacle	2PM
June 6, 2010	New York City	United States	Hammerstein Ballroom	2PM
June 8, 2010	Chicago	United States	House of Blues	2PM
June 9, 2010	Houston	United States	House of Blues	2PM
June 10, 2010	Dallas	United States	House of Blues	2PM
June 11, 2010	Los Angeles	United States	House of Blues	2PM
June 12, 2010	Anaheim	United States	House of Blues	2PM
June 13, 2010	San Francisco	United States	The Fillmore	2PM
Leg 2
June 29, 2010	Vancouver	Canada	Vogue Theatre	—N/a
June 30, 2010	Seattle	United States	Moore Theatre	2AM
July 1, 2010	San Francisco	United States	The Fillmore	2AM
July 2, 2010	San Diego	United States	House of Blues	2AM
July 3, 2010	Las Vegas	United States	House of Blues	2AM
July 6, 2010	Englewood	United States	Gothic Theatre	2AM
July 7, 2010	Chicago	United States	House of Blues	2AM
July 10, 2010	Toronto	Canada	Mod Club Theatre	—N/a
July 12, 2010	Mississauga	Canada	Hammerson Hall	—N/a
July 16, 2010	Honolulu	United States	Pipeline Cafe	Park Jin-young
July 17, 2010	Honolulu	United States	Pipeline Cafe	Park Jin-young

== Wonder World Tour ==
Wonder World Tour
- Tour by Wonder Girls
- Location: Asia
- Associated album: Wonder World; Wonder Party
- Start date: July 7, 2012
- End date: November 3, 2012
- No. of shows: 4

Wonder Girls concert chronology
- Wonder Girls World Tour (2010); Wonder World Tour (2012); Like Money U.S. Tour (2012)

The Wonder World Tour was announced by JYP Entertainment several days after the release of the mini-album Wonder Party. The tickets for the tour went on sale through Yes24 and Interpark's ticket booth on June 12, 2012.

After stepping away from the domestic market, in order to focus on the American activities, the girls wanted to return to Asian fans who supported and waited for their return with their solo tour. When asked about their increased activities in Asia, the members replied, "Because we had to learn English in the States, the amount of time we spent there grew longer and longer, which meant we didn't have a lot of time to see our Asian fans. In an effort to show and share more of us, we mutually agreed to increase our activities. We rushed the release of our new song for our first Korean concert in four years on July 7."

Set lists

Set list in Seoul

Opening act: JJ Project

'Act 1'

1. "Like This"
2. "Nu Shoes"
3. "Sweet Dreams"
4. "The DJ is Mine"
5. [Talk]
6. "Girls Girls"
7. [Talk]

'Act 2'

1. "This Fool" (이바보) (acapella/acoustic intro)
2. "Be My Baby" (Ballad version)

'Act 3'

1. "Hello to Myself" (YeEun's solo stage)
2. "Me, In"
3. "2 Different Tears" (Rock version)
4. "So Hot" (Rock version & Yoobin's solo stage)
5. [Talk]

'Act 4'

1. "It's Not Love/A Sorry Heart" (미안한 마음)
2. "Friend"
3. "Wishing on a Star"
4. "Du Go Du Go" (두고두고)
5. "Girlfriend"
6. Miss A's "Touch" (SunYe's solo stage)

'Act 5'

1. "Act Cool" (Lim's solo stage with SanE)
2. "R.E.A.L"
3. "Be My Baby"
4. Short dance interval + "Be My Baby" (Techno version)
5. "DJ Khoo"

'Act 6'

1. "G.N.O"
2. "Stop!"
3. "Bad Boy"
4. Wonder Girls shuffling + "I Wanna"
5. "Tell Me" (Rock version)
6. "Nobody"
7. WonderFuls surprise event for the Wonder Girls (Wishing on a Star)

Closing

1. Akon interview + Like Money practice video
2. Making of the Concert video
3. Video compilation of behind the scenes/random cute clips from 2007 to the Present
Set list in Singapore

Opening act: JJ Project

'Act 1'

1. "Like This"
2. "Nu Shoes"
3. "Sweet Dreams"
4. "The DJ is Mine"
5. [Talk]
6. "Girls Girls"
7. [Talk]
8. "This Fool" (이바보) (acapella/acoustic intro)

'Act 2'

1. "Hello to Myself" (YeEun's solo stage)
2. "Me, In"
3. "2 Different Tears" (Rock version)
4. "So Hot" (Rock version & Yoobin's solo stage)
5. [Talk]

'Act 3'

1. "It's Not Love/A Sorry Heart" (미안한 마음)
2. "I Tried"
3. "Wishing on a Star"
4. "Du Go Du Go" (두고두고)
5. "Girlfriend"
6. Miss A's "Touch" (SunYe's solo stage)

'Act 4'

1. "Act Cool" (Lim's solo stage with JJ Project)
2. "R.E.A.L"
3. "Be My Baby"
4. Short dance interval + "Be My Baby" (Techno version)

'Act 5'

1. "G.N.O"
2. "Stop!"
3. "Bad Boy"
4. Wonder Girls shuffling + "I Wanna"

'Act 6'

1. "Like Money"
2. "Tell Me" (Rock version)

Closing

1. "Nobody"
Set list in Kuala Lumpur

'Act 1'

1. "Like This"
2. "Nu Shoes"
3. "Sweet Dreams"
4. "The DJ is Mine"
5. [Talk]
6. "Girls Girls"
7. [Talk]
8. "This Fool" (이바보) (acapella/acoustic intro)

'Act 2'

1. "Hello to Myself" (YeEun's solo stage)
2. "Me, In"
3. "2 Different Tears" (Rock version)
4. "So Hot" (Rock version & Yoobin's solo stage)
5. [Talk]

'Act 3'

1. "It's Not Love/A Sorry Heart" (미안한 마음)
2. "I Tried"
3. "Wishing on a Star"
4. "Du Go Du Go" (두고두고)
5. "Girlfriend"
6. Miss A's "Touch" (SunYe's solo stage)

'Act 4'

1. "Act Cool"
2. "R.E.A.L"
3. "Be My Baby"
4. Short dance interval + "Be My Baby" (Techno version)

'Act 5'

1. "G.N.O"
2. "Stop!"
3. "Bad Boy"
4. Wonder Girls shuffling + "I Wanna"

'Act 6'

1. "Like Money"
2. "Tell Me" (Rock version)

Closing

1. "Nobody"
Set list in Jakarta

'Act 1'

1. "Like This"
2. "Nu Shoes"
3. "Sweet Dreams"
4. "The DJ is Mine"
5. [Talk]
6. "Girls Girls"
7. [Talk]
8. "This Fool" (이바보) (acapella/acoustic intro)

'Act 2'

1. "Hello to Myself" (YeEun's solo stage)
2. "Me, In"
3. "2 Different Tears" (Rock version)
4. "So Hot" (Rock version & Yoobin's solo stage)
5. [Talk]

'Act 3'

1. "It's Not Love/A Sorry Heart" (미안한 마음)
2. "I Tried"
3. "Wishing on a Star"
4. "Du Go Du Go" (두고두고)
5. "Girlfriend"
6. Miss A's "Touch" (SunYe's solo stage)

'Act 4'

1. "Act Cool"
2. "R.E.A.L"
3. "Be My Baby"
4. Short dance interval + "Be My Baby" (Techno version)

'Act 5'

1. "G.N.O"
2. "Stop!"
3. "Bad Boy"
4. Wonder Girls shuffling + "I Wanna"

'Act 6'

1. "Like Money"
2. "Tell Me" (Rock version)

Closing

1. "Nobody"

=== Tour dates ===
Date	City	Country	Venue	Attendance
July 7, 2012	Seoul	South Korea	Jamsil Arena	6,000
September 8, 2012	Singapore		Resorts World Sentosa	4,000
October 13, 2012	Kuala Lumpur	Malaysia	Stadium Negara	—
November 3, 2012	Jakarta	Indonesia	Tennis Indoor Senayan	—
Estimated total				N/A

== Fan meetings ==
Event name	Date	City	Country	Venue	Attendance	Ref.
Wonder Girls Fan Meeting in Bangkok	May 10, 2008	Bangkok	Thailand	Parc Paragon	10,000	
Wonder Girls 2nd Fan Meeting	July 26, 2008	Seoul	South Korea	Kwangwoon University	2,000	
CGV New Feeling Wonder Girls Fan Meeting	October 17, 2015	Ganzhou	China	CGV Xingjuhui Film City	—	
Wonder Girls Fan Party In Bangkok	October 31, 2015	Bangkok	Thailand	Chaengwattana Hall	2,000	

== The Like Money U.S. Tour ==
The Like Money U.S. Tour was a promotional tour around the United States to help promote their American single, Like Money.

=== Tour Dates ===
2012
Date	City	Country	Venue
March 31	Los Angeles	United States	Galen Center (Nickelodeon Kid’s Choice Awards)
May 21	Mountain View	United States	Shoreline Amphitheater (MBC Korean Music Wave in Google)
August 19	Los Angeles	United States	GAMeBoi
August 30	Los Angeles	United States	Young Hollywood Interview
September 5	New York City	United States	iHeartRadio Theater
September 9	Los Angeles	United States	Live on Sunset w. Clevver Music
September 11	Los Angeles	United States	AllKPop Video Shoot Interview
October 19	Orlando	United States	House of Blues
October 20	New York City	United States	Hard Rock Cafe (Ty Bentli’s Birthday Bash)
October 22	Houston	United States	House of Blues (Hot 95.7 Boo Bomb 3)
October 24	New York City	United States	U.N. Headquarters (U.N. Day Concert: A Message for Peace)

== Affiliated tours and concerts ==
=== Opening acts ===
- Jonas Brothers World Tour 2009 (2009)

=== JYP Nation ===
- JYP Nation (2009)
- JYP Nation "Team Play" (2010)
- JYP Nation (2011)
- JYP Nation "Hologram Concert" (2016)
- JYP Nation "Mix & Match" (2016)
