= Wonder World (album) =

2011 studio album by Wonder Girls

Studio album by Wonder Girls
- Released: November 7, 2011
- Recorded: 2010–2011
- Genres: K-pop; dance-pop; electropop
- Length: 41:29
- Label: JYP
- Producers: DeepFrost; DJ Nüre; East4A; Fingazz; Fredrik; Lukas Hilbert; Hong Ji-sang; Hyelim; Alexander Kronlund; Lee Woo-min; Rainstone; San E; Shim Eun-ji; Shin Jung-hyeon; Park Jin-young; Park Ye-eun

Wonder Girls chronology
2 Different Tears (2010)	Wonder World (2011)	Wonder Party (2012)

Singles from Wonder World
- 1. "Be My Baby" Released: November 7, 2011

Wonder World is the second Korean-language studio album by South Korean girl group Wonder Girls, released on November 7, 2011, through JYP Entertainment. The track "Be My Baby" served as the lead single from album. Both the album and the single were a commercial success, both having topped the Gaon Album and Digital charts respectively. To promote Wonder World, the group appeared on several South Korean music programs; additionally, Wonder Girls embarked on their Wonder World Tour in July 2012.

For this album, the members of the group became more involved in the songwriting and production. Park Ye-eun wrote and produced "G.N.O." and "Me, In", Kim Yubin wrote "Girls Girls", "Me, In", and "Sweet Dreams", and Woo Hyelim wrote and produced her solo song "Act Cool", featuring San E. The members also recorded two duets: Min Sunye and Yeeun recorded "Long Long Time" while Yubin and Ahn Sohee recorded "SuperB".

== Background and composition ==
On November 4, the album's name was revealed to be Wonder World, consisting of 11 new songs, one remixed song, and an English version of the lead single, "Be My Baby". Various members of the group contributed to composing material for the album. Park Ye-eun was the composer and lyricist for the song "G.N.O." and performed the arrangement and composition for "Me, In", a remake of the 1974 hit "The Beauty" by Shin Jung-hyeon and YeopJeons. In an interview she commented about the strong American influence that she had received while working on new music in the album as she stated "When I went to a club, I heard songs from Rihanna and LMFAO. We thought it would be nice if we could make club music, done right, in Korean."

Woo Hyelim collaborated with rapper San-E for her solo song "Act Cool" for which also helped her write the rap lyrics. Kim Yubin wrote the raps for the songs "Girls Girls" "Me, In" and "Sweet Dreams". Ahn Sohee and Yubin recorded a duet together called "SuperB", and Yeeun and Min Sunye also had a duet titled "두고두고" (Long Long Time). Renowned choreographer Jonte' Moaning choreographed the group's music video for "Be My Baby". Designer Johnny Wujek also worked alongside the group.

== Commercial performance ==
Wonder World entered and peaked at number one on the Gaon Album Chart on the chart issue dated November 6–12, 2011. The album stayed in the Top 10 of the chart for four consecutive weeks. The album entered and peaked at number 4 on the chart for the month of November 2011 with 35,051 physical copies sold. The album placed at number 42 on the Gaon Album Chart for the year 2011 for 34,140 physical copies sold. In the United States, the album entered and peaked at number 5 on Billboard's World Albums chart on the week ending November 26, 2011. "Be My Baby" went to number 1 on both the Gaon Weekly Digital Charts and the Billboard K-pop Hot 100. The song was also featured in the group's TV movie, Wonder Girls at the Apollo, which aired on TeenNick.

== Accolades ==
Awards and nominations
Year	Organization	Work	Award	Result
2011	Gaon Chart Music Awards	"Be My Baby"	Song of the Month (November)	Won
2012	Golden Disc Awards	Wonder World	Disk Bonsang	Nominated
2012	Golden Disc Awards	Wonder World	Popularity Award	Nominated

Music program wins
Song	Program	Date
"Be My Baby"	Mnet's M! Countdown	November 17, 2011
"Be My Baby"	Mnet's M! Countdown	November 24, 2011
"Be My Baby"	SBS's Inkigayo	November 27, 2011
"Be My Baby"	SBS's Inkigayo	December 4, 2011
"Be My Baby"	SBS's Inkigayo	December 11, 2011

== Track listing ==
Wonder World – Standard edition
No.	Title	Writer(s)	Producer(s)	Length
1.	"G.N.O."	Park Ye-eun	Yeeun; Lee Woo-min; Fredrik	3:30
2.	"Be My Baby"	Park Jin-young	Park Jin-young	3:31
3.	"Girls Girls"	Kim Yu-bin; Shim Eun-ji	Eun-ji	3:33
4.	"Me, In"	Yu-bin; Ye-eun; Shin Jung-hyeon	Jung-hyeon; Ye-eun	3:14
5.	"Sweet Dreams"	Yu-bin; Billion Dollar Baby; Noday	DeepFrost; Eun-ji	3:34
6.	"Stop!"	Hong Ji-sang	Hong Ji-sang	3:22
7.	"Dear Boy"	Jessica Martinez; Nicole Flores	Fingazz; DJ Nüre	3:11
8.	"두고두고" (Long Long Time) (Sunye and Yeeun duet))	Park Jin-young	Park Jin-young	3:46
9.	"SuperB" (Yubin and Sohee duet)	Kim Eana	East4A	3:19
10.	"Act Cool" (Hyelim solo featuring San E)	Woo Hye-rim; Jung San	Woo; San E	3:33
11.	"Be My Baby" ("Ra.D" mix)	Park Jin-young	Park Jin-young	3:27
12.	"Nu Shoes"	Woo Seok-rhee; Alexander Kronlund; Lukas Hilbert	Rainstone; Kronlund; Hilbert	3:29
Total length:				41:29

Wonder World – iTunes Store edition (bonus track)
No.	Title	Length
13.	"Be My Baby" (English version)	3:32
Total length:		45:01

Wonder World – Taiwanese special edition (bonus track)
No.	Title	Length
13.	"Be My Baby" (Chinese version)	3:32
Total length:		45:01

Wonder World – Taiwanese special edition (bonus DVD)
No.	Title	Length
1.	"Be My Baby" (music video)
2.	"Be My Baby" (making film)
3.	"Be My Baby" (album shooting)
4.	"Real Wonder Girls"

Wonder World – Malaysian and Singaporean special edition (bonus DVD)
No.	Title	Length
1.	"Teaser 1"
2.	"Teaser 2"
3.	"Be My Baby" (music video)
4.	"Real WG "Magazine""
5.	"Real WG "Fan Session""
6.	"Be My Baby" (making of music video)
7.	"Jacket Making"

Sample credits

- "Me, In" contains a sample of the Shin Jung-hyeon song "The Beauty".

== Credits and personnel ==
- Sunye – vocals (all tracks except 9, 10)
- Yeeun – vocals (all tracks except 9, 10), songwriting, production (tracks 1, 4), rearrangement (track 4)
- Yubin – rapping (all tracks except 8, 10), songwriting (tracks 3, 4, 5)
- Sohee – vocals (all tracks except for tracks 8, 10)
- Hyelim – vocals, rapping (all tracks except 8, 9), songwriting, production (track 10)
- Lee Woo-min – producer (track 1), rearrangement (track 4)
- Fredrik – producer (track 1)
- Cho Jong-soo – raps (track 1)
- Park Jin-young – songwriting, production (tracks 2, 8, 11)
- Shim Eun-ji – songwriting (track 3), production (tracks 3, 5)
- Shin Jung-hyeon – songwriting, production (track 4)
- Billion Dollar Baby – songwriting (track 5)
- Noday - songwriting (track 5)
- DeepFrost - production (track 5)
- Hong Ji-sang – songwriting, production (track 6)
- Jessica Martinez – songwriting (track 7)
- Nikki Flores – songwriting (track 7)
- Fingazz – production (track 7)
- DJ Nüre – production (track 7)
- Kim Eana – songwriting (track 8)
- East4A – production (track 8)
- San E – featured artist, rapping, songwriting, production (track 10)
- Woo Seok Rhee – songwriting, production (track 12)
- Alexander Kronlund – songwriting, production (track 12)
- Lukas Hilbert – songwriting, production (track 12)

== Charts ==
=== Weekly charts ===
Chart (2011)	Peak position
South Korean Albums (Gaon)	1
US World Albums (Billboard)	5

=== Monthly charts ===
Chart (2011)	Peak position
South Korean Albums (Gaon)	4

=== Year-end charts ===
Chart (2011)	Position
South Korean Albums (Gaon)	42

== Sales ==
Country	Sales
South Korea (Gaon)	43,349

== Release history ==
Region	Date	Edition	Format	Label	Catalog	Ref.
South Korea	November 7, 2011	Standard	CD; digital download	JYP; LOEN	L100004386	
United States	November 7, 2011	Standard	Digital download	JYP	–	
Taiwan	January 6, 2012	Standard; Special	CD; DVD; digital download	Universal Music	1027259494	
Malaysia	April 10, 2012	Standard; Special	CD; DVD; digital download	JYP; Warner Music	5053105239122	
Singapore	April 10, 2012	Standard; Special	CD; DVD; digital download	JYP; Warner Music	5053105239122	
