= Welcome to Wonderland =

Welcome To Wonderland may refer to:

- "Welcome to Wonderland", a song from the album Wonderland by Sea of Treachery
- Welcome to Wonderland (TV series), a documentary about the Wonder Girls daily life
- Welcome to Wonderland (film), a feature documentary film about music and dance
- The "Welcome to Wonderland" series, books for children written by Chris Grabenstein
