= I Feel You (Wonder Girls song) =

Single by Wonder Girls

from the album Reboot
- Language: Korean
- Released: August 3, 2015
- Genre: Pop rock
- Length: 3:25
- Label: JYP
- Composers: J.Y. Park "The Asiansoul"; Hong Ji-sang
- Lyricists: Park Jin-young; e.one

Wonder Girls singles chronology
"Like This" (2012)	"I Feel You" (2015)	"Why So Lonely" (2016)

Music video
- "I Feel You" on YouTube

"I Feel You" is a song recorded by South Korean girl group Wonder Girls for their third studio album Reboot. Described as a synth-driven pop rock track by Billboard, was released by JYP Entertainment on August 3, 2015.

== Background and release ==
On June 24, 2015, it was reported that member Sunmi would return to the group following her initial departure in February 2010. On July 20, it was confirmed that members Sohee and Sunye had officially withdrawn from the group. The same day, JYP Entertainment announced the return of Wonder Girls with a new band concept making it their first release in over three years. For this concept, Sunmi plays bass guitar, Yubin plays drums, Hyelim plays guitar, and Yeeun plays piano. Individual teasers of the members playing their respective instruments began being released on July 20. On August 3, Wonder Girls appeared live for the 'Wonder Girls Reboot Showcase' on the new Naver app 'V' to celebrate the release.

== Composition ==
"I Feel You" was written by Park Jin-young and e.one and composed by Park Jin-young and Hong ji-sang. It is described as a 1980s-inspired, synth-driven pop rock song. The song "I Feel You" is composed in the key B-sharp major and has 119 beats per minute and a running time of 3 minutes and 25 seconds.

== Promotion ==
Wonder Girls first promoted "I Feel You" on KBS's Music Bank on August 7, MBC's Show! Music Core on August 8, and SBS's Inkigayo on August 9, 2015 for the first week of promotion.

== Charts ==
=== Weekly charts ===
Weekly chart positions
Chart (2015)	Peak position
South Korea (Gaon)	3
US World Digital Songs (Billboard)	12

=== Monthly charts ===
Chart (August 2015)	Peak position
South Korea (Gaon)	5

=== Year-end charts ===
Chart (2015)	Position
South Korea (Gaon)	79

== Sales ==
Country	Sales
South Korea (digital)	842,000

== Awards and nominations ==
Awards and nominations
Year	Organization	Award	Result	Ref.
2015	Mnet Asian Music Awards	Best Music Video	Nominated	

== Publication lists ==
Publication lists for "I Feel You"
Critic/Publication	List	Rank	Ref.
Billboard	The 100 Greatest K-pop Songs of the 2010s	70	
Idolator	The 25 Best K-pop Songs of 2015	16	
PopMatters	The Best K-pop of 2015	11	
Vice	The Top 20 K-pop Songs of 2015	9	

== Release history ==
Release history for "I Feel You"
Region	Date	Format	Label
Various	August 3, 2015	Digital download	JYP
