= Like Money (song) =

- Top: Akon; Bottom: Yeeun, Yubin, Sohee, Sunye, Lim

Single by Wonder Girls featuring Akon
- Released: July 10, 2012 (U.S.)
- Recorded: 2011–2012
- Genre: Dance-pop; synthpop
- Label: JYP Entertainment
- Songwriters: Teriy Keys, Cri$tyle, Lukas Hilbert
- Producers: Rainstone, Lukas Hilbert, Teriy Keys

Wonder Girls singles chronology
"Like This" (2012)	"Like Money" (2012)	"I Feel You" (2015)

Akon singles chronology
"Chop My Money" (2012)	"Like Money" (2012)	"Play Hard" (2013)

Music video
- "Like Money" on YouTube

"Like Money" is a song by South Korean girl group Wonder Girls, featuring Senegalese-American singer Akon. It was released as a digital single on July 10, 2012, and was sent to mainstream top 40 stations on September 17 of the same year. This was the group's first original English language single, and also their last.

== Background ==
Prior to its release, the song was featured on their TV movie, The Wonder Girls, which aired on TeenNick.

The song was written by Cri$tyle, and Lukas Hilbert and produced by Woo S. Rhee " RAINSTONE" and Hilbert, with music by Aleksander Kronlund, Woo S. Rhee " RAINSTONE " and Lukas Hilbert with additional executive production by Teriy Keys. The choreography was created by Jonte' Moaning, who previously created the choreography for "The DJ is Mine" and "Be My Baby".

== Release and promotion ==
On July 4, 2012 the first teaser for the music video of "Like Money" was released, showcasing a "space" concept.

JYPE revealed that a special artist would be collaborating with the girls on the song who had amassed over 40 million likes on Facebook. A teaser released on July 6 confirmed the featuring artist to be Akon. In addition, Johnny Wujek was revealed as the stylist for the video.

The first live performances of the song took place at the Green Groove Festival 2012 on July 21 and at Chungcheongnam-do’s Boryeung seaside on July 22.

== Critical reception ==
Han Dong-yoon of IZM gave "Like Money" a negative review, feeling that the song was generic and "followed a mediocre framework of electropop".

== Track listing ==
No.	Title	Lyrics	Music	Length
1.	"Like Money (featuring Akon)"	Cri$tyle, Lukas Hilbert, Tery Keys	Lukas Hilbert, Woo S. Rhee " RAINSTONE"	3:30
Total length:				3:30

== Charts ==
In its first week of release the song debuted at number 11 in South Korea with 161,542 downloads. By the end of August 2012 the song was downloaded 583,737 times in South Korea alone, making the song one of the best-selling English-language songs of the year in Korea.

Charts	Peak position
Gaon Single Chart (South Korea)	11
K-Pop Billboard Hot 100	14
