= Like This (Wonder Girls song) =

2012 single by Wonder Girls

Single by Wonder Girls

from the album Wonder Party
- Released: June 3, 2012
- Recorded: 2012
- Genre: K-pop
- Length: 3:13
- Label: JYP
- Songwriter: Park Jin-young
- Producer: Park Jin-young

Wonder Girls singles chronology
"Be My Baby" (2011)	"Like This" (2012)	"I Feel You" (2015)

Music video
- "Like This" on YouTube

"Like This" is a song recorded by K-pop girl group Wonder Girls for their third EP Wonder Party. It is the last single to feature members Sohee and Sunye before their departures from the group in December 2013 and June 2015 respectively.

== Release ==
On June 3, 2012, both the music video for "Like This" and their third EP Wonder Party were released.

== Composition ==
"Like This" was written and composed by JYP Entertainment founder Park Jin-young. The song is composed in the key C-sharp major and has 194 beats per minute and a running time of 3 minutes and 13 seconds.

== Promotion ==
Wonder Girls first performed "Like This" on Mnet's M Countdown on June 14 and June 21. They also performed on MBC M's Show Champion on June 19, 2012.

== Accolades ==
Awards for "Like This"
Year	Organization	Award	Result	Ref.
2013	Gaon Chart Music Awards	Song of the Month (July)	Won	

Music program wins
Program	Date	Ref.
Show Champion	June 12, 2012	
Show Champion	June 19, 2012	
Inkigayo	June 17, 2012	
Inkigayo	June 24, 2012	
Music Bank	June 24, 2012	

== Charts ==
=== Weekly charts ===
Weekly chart positions
Chart (2012)	Peak position
South Korea (Gaon)	2
South Korea (K-pop Hot 100)	1
US World Digital Songs (Billboard)	4

=== Monthly charts ===
Chart (June 2012)	Peak position
South Korea (Gaon)	1

=== Year-end charts ===
Chart (2012)	Peak position
South Korea (Gaon)	18

== Publication lists ==
Publication lists for "Like This"
Critic/Publication	List	Rank	Ref.
Popjustice	Top 15 K‑Pop Singles of 2012	15	
Spin	Top 20 K-pop Singles of 2012	12	

== Sales ==
Country	Sales
South Korea (digital)	2,320,000

== Release history ==
Release history for "Like This"
Region	Date	Format	Label
Various	June 3, 2012	Digital download	JYP
