= Made in Wonder Girls =

- No. of episodes: 10

Release
- Original network: M.net (in Korean)
- Original release: July 30 – October 1, 2010

Season chronology
- ← Previous; Welcome To Wonderland

Made in Wonder Girls (Korean: 메이드 인 원더걸스) is a television reality show broadcast by M.net that gives a behind-the-scenes tour of the Wonder Girls' first US tour, Wonder Girls World Tour, as well as their promotions in Singapore and Indonesia. Made in Wonder Girls was Hyerim (Lim)'s first reality show since her addition to Wonder Girls. There were also appearances by Wonder Girls, JYP, 2PM, and 2AM.

== Episodes ==
No.	Title	Original release date
1	"Episode 1"	July 30, 2010
The Wonder Girls gives a tour of their home/office in New York City, rehearse, and talk about their concerns about their upcoming tour. On their day off before their tour, the Wonder Girls go around New York and talk about living in America, the experiences that they have gain, and reflect on themselves as group and as individuals.
2	"Episode 2"	August 6, 2010
The Wonder Girls and 2PM arrives in Washington DC. They rehearse, have sound checks, setup lighting, and make other preparations. Later on that night, they perform their first concert on the Wonder Girls World Tour. The next day they travel to Atlanta to perform their first back-to-back concert. The Wonder Girls, 2PM, and staff's flights to New York City got canceled.
3	"Episode 3"	August 13, 2010
The Wonder Girls and 2PM flights from Atlanta to New York City is canceled and they struggle to get to New York City for their concert. Afterward the Wonder Girls and JYP reviews their first few concerts.
4	"Episode 4"	August 20, 2010
The Wonder Girls visit Singapore, Las Vegas, and Chicago. In Singapore, the Wonder Girls have a Fan Signing and go shopping. The Wonder Girls visit Las Vegas during the 4th of July. SooHee, Lim, and Yubin walk through the Las Vegas Strip. While SunYe, Yenny, Seulong, and Jo Kwon visit Adventuredome in Circus Circus. In the hotel room in Chicago, Lim imitates some of her favorite artists and songs.
5	"Episode 5"	August 27, 2010
The Wonder Girls visit Singapore, Chicago, San Francisco, Honolulu, and Anaheim. In Chicago, Lim imitates more of her favorite artists, Sun and Yenny go bowling, while Sohee, Yubin, and Lim go out on the town. In San Francisco, the Wonder Girls and 2PM travel to the venue and Junsu improv a song about San Francisco. In Honolulu the Wonder Girls and JYP visit Waikiki Beach. In Anaheim, Sun and Yubin go shopping at the World of Disney Store in Downtown Disney.
6	"Episode 6"	September 3, 2010
The Wonder Girls visit San Diego, Vancouver, Honolulu, and Jakarta. In San Diego, 2AM and the Wonder Girls arrive at the airport greeted by fans and travel to the Venue. In Vancouver, the Wonder Girls prepare for their first concert in Canada. SunYe goes shopping in Waikiki Beach. The Wonder Girls prepare for their concert in Vancouver. Also a tribute to SunYe and her father
7	"Episode 7"	September 10, 2010
The Wonder Girls visit Toronto, San Diego, Jakarta, and Dallas. Lim presents her powerpoint slides of her life's plan. YeEun and SunYe walk through the streets of Toronto. Jinwoon tries to buy a guitar in San Diego. 2PM and the Wonder Girls hang out at the Dallas-Fort Worth airport. In Jakarta, the Wonder Girls rehearse and perform for a concert.
8	"Episode 8"	September 17, 2010
The Wonder Girls go to Atlanta, San Diego, Singapore, Denver, and Houston. In Atlanta, the Wonder Girls and 2PM play pool. In San Diego, the story continues on Jinwoon's guitar purchase. The staff and crew have venue problems in Denver. The Wonder Girls and 2PM perform at a sell-out venue in Houston. In Singapore, the Wonder Girls eats deserts, visit Chinatown, and have a meet and greet with the press and fans
9	"Episode 9"	September 24, 2010
2PM visits Muir Wood in San Francisco. Sohee and 2PM play pool in Atlanta. In Los Angeles, the Wonder Girls and 2PM arrive at the House of Blues (Sunset), Yenny Give a back stage tour, and Yubin's parents visits. In Mississauga, The Wonder Girls relax in the break room and Lim give a back stage tour of the Mississauga Living Arts Centre. In New York City, the Wonder Girls have dinner with JYP.
10	"Episode 10"	October 1, 2010
The Wonder Girls and 2PM relax back stage in Chicago. In New York City, JYP and the Wonder Girls have dinner together and talk about love and marriage. 2AM talks about touring with the Wonder Girls. The Wonder Girls talk about what they think about each others and gives a special message to SunMi. In Honolulu, they have their final performance of their 50-day Wonder Girls World Tour and say farewell to the staff and crew and reflect their thoughts about their first United States tour ending.

== Music ==
The music for the opening credits of the show is We Ride, which is produced by Tommy Park.
