= Reboot (Wonder Girls album) =

Studio album by Wonder Girls
- Released: August 3, 2015
- Recorded: 2015
- Genres: Pop rock; dance-pop; electropop; synthpop; chillwave
- Length: 43:11
- Language: Korean
- Label: JYP
- Producers: Frants; Hong Ji-sang; Hyelim; Ju Hyo; Yubin; Lee Toyo; Shim Eun-ji; Sunmi; Yeeun

Wonder Girls chronology
Wonder Best (2012)	Reboot (2015)	Why So Lonely (2016)

Singles from Reboot
- 1. "I Feel You" Released: August 3, 2015

Reboot is the third and final studio album by South Korean girl group Wonder Girls. It was released on August 3, 2015, through JYP Entertainment. The Wonder Girls were more involved in the composition of this album, with each member having writing and/or production credits on at least one song; each song has credits for at least one member. It was their first studio album since 2007 to feature member Sunmi and their first since the departure of members Sunye and Sohee. The album musically conveys a 1980s-inspired style, incorporating genres including synthpop, hip hop, pop rock and dance-pop.

Reboot received widespread critical acclaim, who lauded the album's concept and musical styles. Billboard named it the best K-pop album of 2015 and ranked it fourth among the best K-pop albums of the 2010s. Additionally, Educational Broadcasting System (EBS) and Paste included it in their lists of the best K-pop albums. Commercially, Reboot charted at number five on the Gaon Album Chart and number two on the Billboard World Albums. It was preceded by the release of the single "I Feel You", released on August 2, 2015.

== Background and composition ==
On June 24, 2015, it was reported that member Sunmi would return to the group following her initial departure in February 2010. On July 20, it was confirmed that members Sohee and Sunye had officially withdrawn from the group. The same day, JYP Entertainment announced the return of the Wonder Girls with a new band concept. For this concept, Sunmi plays bass guitar, Yubin plays drums, Hyelim plays guitar, and Yeeun plays piano. Individual teasers of the members playing their respective instruments began being released on July 20. Despite the concept, none of the members actually recorded instrumentals for the album, though they learned to play the instruments and performed songs with their instruments live. Yeeun was the only member of the group to have considerable experience playing her instrument, the piano, prior to the lead up to the comeback.

== Singles and promotion ==
On July 29, a promotional video for the release of Reboot was released on YouTube. "I Feel You" served as the lead single for the album, being released on August 2. It was accompanied by a music video directed by Lumpens, which premiered on the same day on JYP Entertainment's YouTube channel. "I Feel You" and its music video are heavily inspired by 1980s music, similar to the group's 2008 single "So Hot". It takes place in 1987 and shows each member playing her own respective instrument. KBS considered the music video to be "too sexy and revealing" and only aired the video after certain dance moves were cut.

"I Feel You" is their first single since Sunye's and Sohee's departures and their first single since the English version release of "Nobody" (2009) to feature Sunmi. The song was promoted on major South Korean music shows, starting on August 8 on KBS's Music Bank; on those shows, they also performed other tracks from the album, including "Candle", "Back", and "Rewind". They also appeared on variety shows, including MBC every1's Weekly Idol. In addition, the group appeared on various radio shows.
The songs "Candle" (featuring Paloalto) and "Rewind" had dance practice videos released on YouTube on August 11 and 20, respectively.

== Critical reception ==
Reboot received critical acclaim; it was ranked number one on Billboard's list of the 10 Best K-pop Albums of 2015 with editor Jeff Benjamin praising the record's thematic concept: "Reboot showcases the importance of a concept and what happens when an act believes in that concept. [...] It’s that type of dedication to your concept, nay art, that makes for a body of work that rises above the rest. As previously mentioned, this year was filled with a spectacular amount of K-pop album releases, but the best comes when the act fully embraces what makes them unique." iTunes Japan named it the best K-pop album of the year while Korean music webzine Idology ranked it the year's third best album, with critic Squib writing that "What the Wonder Girls are rebooting here is not their careers, but a 'real taste of K-pop'."

Billboard named Reboot the fourth best K-pop album of the 2010s decade in 2019, hailing the LP as a "testament to the power of pre-established musical genres as a transformative means of expressing oneself". They remarked that it's not a "rehash", "it's a reboot." Cielo Perez from Paste ranked it the 8th greatest K-pop album of all time, writing that "there’s something for everyone to latch onto and obsess over on this album—a true benchmark of brilliance."

Reboot on critic lists
Publication	List	Work	Rank	Ref.
Billboard	The 10 Best K-pop Albums of 2015	Reboot	1	
Billboard	The 25 Greatest K-pop Albums of the 2010s	Reboot	4	
EBS	Top 100 Korean Albums (2004–2023)	Reboot	Included	
Fuse	The 20 Best Albums of 2015	Reboot	18	
Idology	10 Best Albums of 2015	Reboot	3	
Paste	The 30 Greatest K-pop Albums of All Time	Reboot	8	
Idolator	The 25 Best K-pop Songs of 2015	"I Feel You"	15	
PopMatters	The Best K-pop of 2015	"I Feel You"	11	
Vice	The Top 20 K-pop Songs of 2015	"I Feel You"	9	

== Commercial performance ==
Commercially, Reboot underperformed in comparison to the group's earlier albums. It debuted at number five on the Gaon Album Chart, selling 12,789 copies by August 2016. In the United States, the album debuted at number 2 on the Billboard US World Albums chart, becoming their best charting album on that chart. It also peaked at number twenty-five on US Heatseekers Albums. The main single, "I Feel You", charted at number one on eight major South Korean music streaming charts during the week of its release. It peaked at number three on the country's comprehensive Gaon Digital Chart in the week ending on August 15, 2015.

== Track listing ==
Reboot — Standard edition
No.	Title	Writer(s)	Arranger(s)	Length
1.	"Baby Don't Play"	Yeeun; Hong Ji-sang	Yeeun; Hong Ji-sang	3:31
2.	"Candle" (featuring Paloalto)	Hyerim; Frants; Paloalto^{[a]}	Hyerim; Frants	3:44
3.	"I Feel You"	J.Y. Park; e.one^{[b]}	J.Y. Park; Hong Ji-sang	3:25
4.	"Rewind"	Sunmi; Ju Hyo; Lee To-yo	Sunmi; Ju Hyo; Lee To-yo	3:33
5.	"Loved"	Yubin; Shim Eun-ji	Shim Eun-ji	3:39
6.	"John Doe"	Yubin; Hong Ji-sang; Ju Hyo	Yubin; Hong Ji-sang; Ju Hyo	3:11
7.	"One Black Night"	Yeeun; Frants	Yeeun; Frants	3:46
8.	"Back"	Yubin; Hyerim; Lee To-yo	Yubin; Hyerim; Lee To-yo	3:28
9.	"Oppa" (오빠) (Hyerim solo)	Hyerim; Frants	Hyerim; Frants	3:33
10.	"Faded Love" (사랑이 떠나려 할 때; Salang-i tteonalyeo hal ttae)	Sunmi; Shim Eun-ji	Shim Eun-ji	3:53
11.	"Gone" (없어; Eobs-eo)	Yubin; Shim Eun-ji	Shim Eun-ji	3:41
12.	"Remember" (이 순간; I-sungan)	Yeeun; Hong Ji-sang	Yeeun; Hong Ji-sang	3:45
Total length:				43:11

Reboot — Physical edition (bonus track)
No.	Title	Length
13.	"20150711 (Talk)" (featuring Sunye and Sohee)	2:23

Track notes

- ^{^[a]} credited only for lyrics
- ^{^[b]} credited only for composition

== Charts ==
=== Weekly charts ===
Chart (2015)	Peak position
South Korean Albums (Gaon)	5
US World Albums (Billboard)	2
US Heatseekers Albums (Billboard)	25

=== Monthly charts ===
Chart (2015)	Peak position
South Korean Albums (Gaon)	12

== Release history ==
Country	Date	Edition	Format	Label
South Korea	August 3, 2015	Standard	Digital download; CD	JYP Entertainment
Various	August 3, 2015	Standard	Digital download	JYP Entertainment
