= Wonder Party =

EP by Wonder Girls
- Released: June 3, 2012
- Recorded: 2011–12
- Genre: K-pop; dance-pop; R&B; hip-hop; ballad
- Length: 21:04
- Language: Korean; English
- Label: JYP
- Producer: Jerry Barnes; Katreese Barnes; Park Eun-woo; Famties; Fredro; Rodger Green; Lee Woo-min; Mr. Cho; Rainstone; Sangmi Kim; The AsianSoul (exec.); Yeeun

Wonder Girls chronology
Wonder World (2011)	Wonder Party (2012)	Nobody for Everybody (2012)

Singles from Wonder Party
- 1. "The DJ Is Mine" Released: January 12, 2012; 2. "Like This" Released: June 3, 2012

Wonder Party is the third EP by South Korean girl group Wonder Girls. It was released digitally on June 3, 2012, and physically on June 6, 2012. The lead single "Like This" was released on June 3. Its deluxe version was released in the United States on June 19, 2012.

Wonder Party is the last mini-album by the Wonder Girls to feature members Sunye and Sohee before their departures from the group in December 2013 and 2014.

== Background and release ==
With the release of Wonder Party, the group was reported to be undergoing a "musical transformation" by releasing the "powerful dance track" "Like This". J.Y. Park wrote via his Twitter page: "Wonder Girls’ US album now complete, and all the songs on their Korean album have unanimously been approved."

In South Korea, Wonder Party was digitally released on June 3, 2012, which was also the fourth anniversary of the group's second mini album So Hot. A physical edition of the album was released three days later. On June 19, 2012, a deluxe edition of the album was released in the United States. In Malaysia, the album was released in early 2013.

== Track listing ==
Wonder Party – Standard edition
No.	Title	Writer(s)	Producer(s)	Length
1.	"R.E.A.L."	Park Ye-eun	Yeeun; Lee Woo-min; Fredro	3:20
2.	"Like This"	Park Jin-young	The AsianSoul	3:13
3.	"Hey Boy"	Kim Yu-bin	Sangmi Kim; Jerry Barnes; Rodger Green; Katreese Barnes	3:00
4.	"Girlfriend"	Ye-eun	Yeeun; Woo-min	4:01
5.	"Sorry"	Kang Park; Park Eun-woo; Alicia Lee	Eun-woo; Mr. Cho	3:33
6.	"The DJ Is Mine" (featuring School Gyrls)	Cri$tyle; Rhee Woo-seok	Rainstone; Famties	4:00
Total length:				21:04

Wonder Party – deluxe edition
No.	Title	Writer(s)	Producer(s)	Length
7.	"R.E.A.L." (instrumental)	Ye-eun; Woo-min; Fredro	Ye-eun; Woo-min	3:20
8.	"Like This" (instrumental)	Jin-young	The Asiansoul; Ji-sang	3:13
9.	"The DJ Is Mine" (instrumental)	Woo-seok; Famties	Rainstone; Famties	3:59
Total length:				31:35

Wonder Party – Malaysian edition (bonus DVD)
No.	Title	Length
1.	"Like This" (music video)
2.	"Like This Teaser 1"
3.	"Like This Teaser 2"
4.	"Making of Like This Music Video"
5.	"Real Wonder Girls Clip 1"
6.	"Real Wonder Girls Clip 2"

== Awards ==
Awards for "Like This"
Year	Organization	Award	Result	Ref.
2013	Gaon Chart Music Awards	Song of the Month (July)	Won	

Music program wins
Song	Program	Date
"Like This"	MBC M's Show Champion	June 12, 2012
"Like This"	MBC M's Show Champion	June 19, 2012
"Like This"	KBS2's Music Bank	June 15, 2012
"Like This"	SBS's Inkigayo	June 17, 2012
"Like This"	SBS's Inkigayo	June 24, 2012

== Credits and personnel ==
Members

- Sunye – vocals (all tracks)
- Yeeun – vocals (all tracks), songwriting, production (tracks 1, 4)
- Yubin – rapping (all tracks), songwriter (track 3)
- Sohee – vocals (all tracks)
- Hyelim – vocals (all tracks)

Arrangement

- Yeeun (tracks 1, 7)
- Lee Woo-min (tracks 1, 4, 7)
- Park Jin-young (tracks 2, 8)
- Hong Ji-sang (tracks 2, 8)
- Sangmi Kim (track 3)
- Jerry Barnes (track 3)
- Rodger Green (track 3)
- Katreese Barnes (track 3)
- Mr. Cho (tracks 6, 9)

== Charts ==
=== Weekly charts ===
Chart (2012)	Peak position
South Korea Albums (Gaon)	3
US World Albums (Billboard)	9

=== Monthly charts ===
Chart (2012)	Peak position
South Korean Albums (Gaon)	3

=== Year-end charts ===
Chart (2012)	Peak position
South Korean Albums (Gaon)	55

== Sales ==
Chart	Amount
South Korea (Gaon)	35,460

== Release history ==
Country	Date	Format	Label	Edition
Worldwide	June 3, 2012	Digital download	JYP	Standard
South Korea	June 6, 2012	CD	JYP	Standard
United States	June 19, 2012	Digital download	JYP	Deluxe
Malaysia	January 2, 2013	CD; DVD	JYP	Standard
