= Mama The Idol =

2021–2022 South Korean television show

- Promotional poster
- Hangul: 엄마는 아이돌
- Lit.: Mom Is an Idol
- RR: Eommaneun aidol
- MR: Ŏmmanŭn aidol
- Genre: Reality
- Country of origin: South Korea
- Original language: Korean
- No. of seasons: 1
- No. of episodes: 8

Original release
- Network: tvN
- Release: December 10, 2021 – February 4, 2022

Mama The Idol (Korean: 엄마는 아이돌) is a South Korean reality show program which premiered on tvN on December 10, 2021, and aired every Friday at 20:40 (KST) until February 4, 2022.

== Synopsis ==
A reality show surrounding six female idols who had chosen to leave the stage to become mothers. Through various trainings and evaluations (plus fulfilling the criteria of more than 20,000 followers on Instagram and more than 2,000 members in the show's fancafe in 1 month), they return to stand on stage again to perform, debuting together as an idol group M.M.D (마마돌).

== Cast ==
=== Main ===
- Kahi
- Park Jung-ah
- Byul
- Yang Eun-ji
- Hyun Jyu-ni
- Sunye

=== Comeback Summon Squad ===
- Hong Jin-kyung
- Do Kyung-wan
- Cho Seung-youn
- Lee Chan-won

=== Comeback Masters ===
- Vocal Mentors
  - Park Sun-joo
  - Han Won-jong
- Choreographers
  - Bae Yoon-jung
  - Lia Kim
  - J Black
  - Mmary
  - LoveRan
- Music Producers
  - Seo Yong-bae
  - Kim Do-hoon

=== Idol Cheering Squad ===
Idol Group	Episode(s)	No. of episodes	No. of appearances
G-reyish	1-2, 3, 4–5	5	3
Verivery	1-2	2	1
Onewe	1-2, 4–5	4	2
Purple Kiss	1-2, 5	3	2
Tri.be	1-2, 4–5	4	2
Pixy	1-2, 4–5	4	2
TO1	1-2, 5	3	2
Lightsum	1-2, 3	3	2
Just B	1-2, 3, 5	4	3
Oneus	3, 5	2	2
Billlie	3, 5	2	2
Laboum	4-5	2	1
T1419	4-5	2	1
Bvndit	4-5	2	1
Rocket Punch	4-5	2	1
Cignature	4-5	2	1
Bling Bling	4-5	2	1
Pink Fantasy	5	1	1
Kep1er	5	1	1

== Episodes ==
Ep.	Broadcast Date	Mission	Special appearances	Ref.
1	December 10, 2021	Reality Check Performance	—N/a	
2	December 17, 2021	Reality Check Performance	—N/a	
3	December 24, 2021	Main Dancers Selection	—N/a	
4	January 7, 2022	Main Vocalist Selection; First Full Performance	2AM (Note: Serving as interim check judges for the Main Vocalist selection mission.)	
5	January 14, 2022	Main Vocalist Selection; First Full Performance	—N/a	
6	January 20, 2022 (Note: For this episode it won't be aired on its original timeslot due to the broadcast of South Korea national football team's friendly match against Moldova national football team.)	Close Friends Concert	Na Yoon-kwon, Seo In-young, Kim Eun-jung, Ha Joo-yeon, Sunmi, Park Jin-young	
7	January 28, 2022	Debut Preparations		
8	February 4, 2022	Music Broadcast Debut; Final Concert	Kyuhyun (Super Junior), BamBam, Pentagon, Fromis 9, Sandara Park	

== Ratings ==
Ep.	Broadcast date	Average audience share (Nielsen Korea)	
Ep.	Broadcast date	Nationwide	Seoul
1	December 10, 2021	3.782%	4.106%
2	December 17, 2021	3.341%	3.545%
3	December 24, 2021	2.217%	2.366%
4	January 7, 2022	2.562%	2.521%
5	January 14, 2022	2.658%	NR
6	January 20, 2022	3.581%	3.945%
7	January 28, 2022	2.194%	2.167%
8	February 4, 2022	2.935%	3.022%

- In the table above, the blue numbers represent the lowest ratings and the red numbers represent the highest ratings.
- This show airs on a cable channel/pay TV which normally has a relatively smaller audience compared to free-to-air TV/public broadcasters (KBS, SBS, MBC & EBS).
