= Welcome to Wonderland (film) =

- Directed by: James Short
- Release date: 2006
- Country: Australia
- Language: English

Welcome to Wonderland is a feature documentary film, by director James Short, about music and dance. Released on DVD in June 2006 after more than five years in the making, this film explores Australia's vibrant outdoor bush rave party scene through the thoughts of participants.

The trance scene in Melbourne, Australia, is considered one of the best in the world, and sees the convergence of travellers from all parts of the globe, especially Japan and Israel. With party organisations like Rainbow Serpent and Earthcore there are as many as 10,000 people who come together to celebrate and dance. The film follows the party lives of characters: Matty, Krusty, Lauire, Margaret, Raff, and Holly.

== Film Festivals ==
- Official Selection of the Hungary Mediawave Film Festival - 2007
- Official Selection of the Byron Bay Film Festival - 2007
