= Wonder Girls =

South Korean girl group (2007–2017)

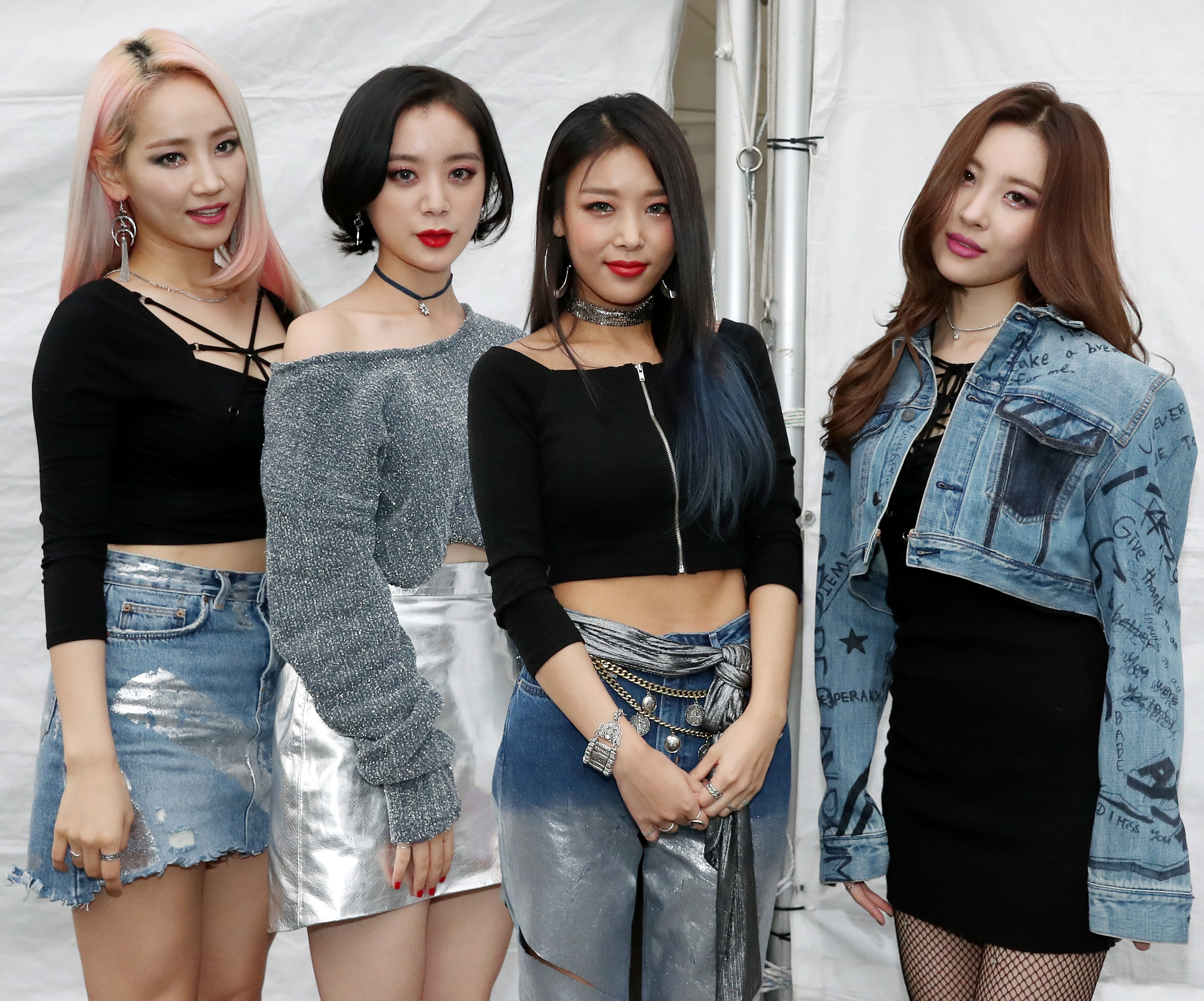
- Wonder Girls in September 2016; From left to right: Yeeun, Hyerim, Yubin, and Sunmi

Background information
- Origin: Seoul, South Korea
- Genres: K-pop; retro; pop rock; dance-pop
- Years active: 2007–2017
- Labels: JYP; DefStar; Jonas; Studio J
- Past members: Yubin; Yeeun; Sunye; Sunmi; Hyuna; Sohee; Hyerim

Wonder Girls (Korean: 원더걸스) were a South Korean girl group formed by JYP Entertainment. The group debuted in February 2007 with the single "Irony" and 5 members: Yeeun, Sunye, Sunmi, Hyuna, and Sohee. After Hyuna's departure in July, Yubin was added into the group prior to the release of their debut studio album, The Wonder Years (2007). The album spawned the hit single "Tell Me", which topped various South Korean music charts.

Wonder Girls further established themselves as one of the top girl groups in the country with the hit singles "So Hot" and "Nobody", released in 2008. After being released as a single in the U.S. in 2009, "Nobody" charted at No. 76 on the Billboard Hot 100, making Wonder Girls the first South Korean act to enter the chart. The group began their entry into the American market the same year as an opening act for the Jonas Brothers' World Tour, performing English versions of their songs.

In early 2010, Sunmi left the group to pursue an academic career and was replaced by Hyerim prior to the worldwide release of the single "2 Different Tears" later that year. Their second studio album, Wonder World (2011), yielded the hit single "Be My Baby". In 2012, Wonder Girls starred in the TeenNick movie The Wonder Girls, and released their last 3 singles as a quintet, notably "Like This" and "Like Money", before going on a 3-year long hiatus. In 2015, it was announced that Sunye and Sohee decided to leave the group while Sunmi would resume promotion with the remaining members. The 4-piece adapted a band-oriented concept for their acclaimed third and final studio album, Reboot (2015), and the No. 1 2016 single "Why So Lonely".

Wonder Girls are also known as "South Korea's Retro Queens", as their music has been noted to contain elements from the 1960s through 80s. In 2017, Billboard ranked Wonder Girls at number 3 on their "Top 10 K-pop Girl Groups of the Past Decade" list. The group officially disbanded on January 26, 2017, after unsuccessful contract renewal negotiation with some of its members. On February 10, 2017, they released their final single "Draw Me", which also served as a celebration of their 10th anniversary.

== History ==
=== 2006–07: MTV Wonder Girls, debut and line-up changes ===
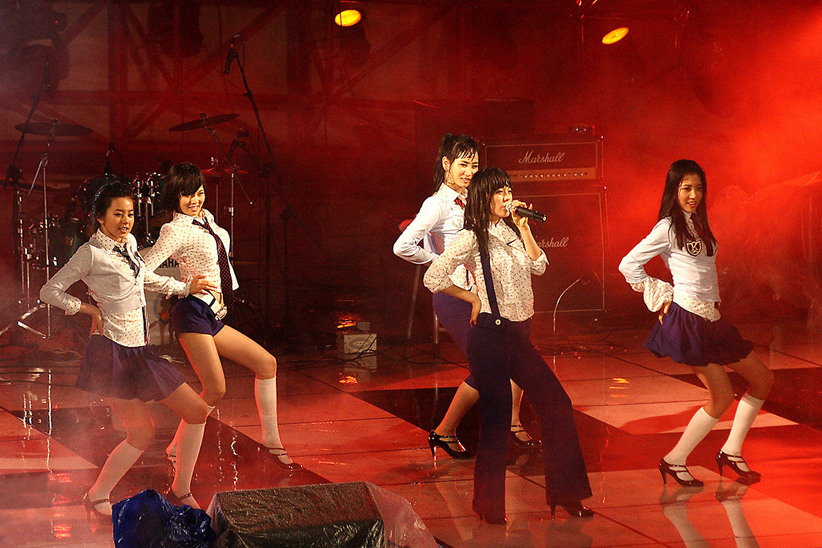
Wonder Girls performing "Irony" at Hanyang University in March 2007

After Park Jin-young revealed the name of his first girl group Wonder Girls in May 2006, the Wonder Girls were introduced through a TV show titled MTV Wonder Girls. The first four episodes outlined the characteristics and profiles of each member. Shortly after selecting Yeeun as the fifth member, the Wonder Girls held their first showcase in the MTV Studio. They performed a cover version of "Don't Cha" by the Pussycat Dolls as well as original songs, including "Irony" and "It's Not Love". Sunye sang Destiny's Child's "Stand Up for Love", while Hyuna performed a showcase of her dancing skills. The other three members—Yeeun, Sunmi, and Sohee—performed a cover version of Janet Jackson's "Together Again".

The Wonder Girls officially debuted in early 2007 on MBC's Show! Music Core, performing "Irony", the hip-hop single from their debut EP, The Wonder Begins. The album sold 11,454 physical copies in 2007. Shortly after, "Wonderfuls", the official Wonder Girls fanclub, was established. The group held several showcases in China after receiving Chinese lessons. In mid-2007, however, members of the Wonder Girls were beset by various injuries and health problems. On June 25, Sohee was sidelined for a month after tearing a knee ligament in a fall from a running motorcycle during the filming of the movie I Like It Hot.

The remaining four members continued performing until late July, when Hyuna withdrew from the group due to her problems with chronic gastroenteritis and fainting spells. In August 2007, the talent agency Good Entertainment sent their trainee Yubin to JYP Entertainment as a replacement for Hyuna. She made her debut three days later in the group's live performance of "Tell Me" on Music Bank.

Their first full-length album, The Wonder Years, was released the following week with "Tell Me" as the lead single. Due to the last-minute addition of Yubin, the album version does not contain her part. However, the performance version of the song was reworked to include a bridge with rapping by Yubin. The single was a hit and reached number one on various Korean television and internet music charts, including KBS's Music Bank. The song also became a number one hit in Thailand. The choreography for the song was simple and widely imitated: by October, many fan performances of the dance circulated on video sharing sites such as YouTube and Daum, including one by a group of policemen who were eventually profiled on SBS's Star King. The dance's popularity it received became widely known as the "Tell Me Virus". The Wonder Girls had an extensive promotional schedule for their album, and in late 2007 they began performing their second single, "이 바보" ("This Fool"). MTV also began broadcasting The Wonder Life, a reality TV series starring the girls.

=== 2008: Breakthrough ===
In February 2008, the Wonder Girls joined their producer Park Jin-young for his month-long concert tour through Korea and the United States as special guests, where they filmed the music video for "Wishing on a Star" while in New York. "So Hot" was released on May 22, 2008. The song topped online charts soon after. In mid-2008, they performed on MBC's Show! Music Core, performing "So Hot" and "This Time". Due to a vocal cord injury, Yubin temporarily lip-synced her parts under doctor's orders.

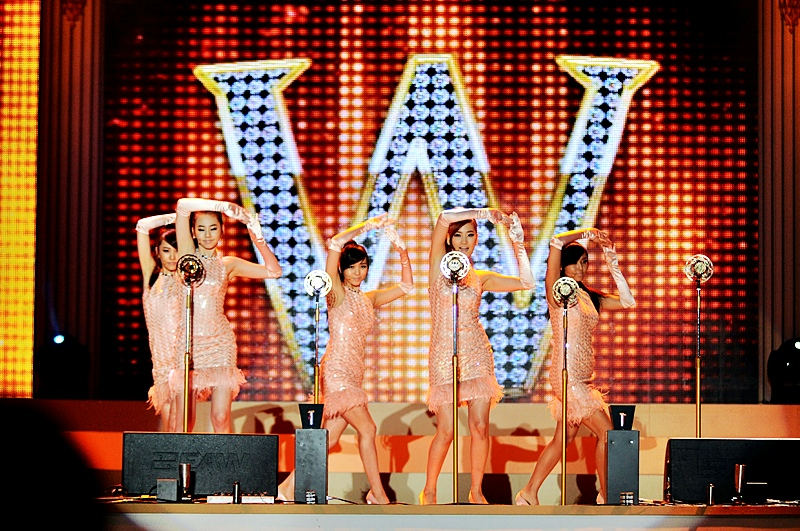
Wonder Girls performing "Nobody" at the 2008 BICHE opening ceremony in October 2008

On September 22, 2008, the group released the single "Nobody". They performed the following weekend on Show! Music Core, Music Bank and Inkigayo. The song went to No. 1 on KBS' Music Bank, staying there for four consecutive weeks, and also won Cyworld's "Song of the Month" award in September and October 2008. Like "Tell Me", "Nobody" also sparked a dance craze.

At the 2008 Mnet KM Music Festival Awards, the Wonder Girls received three awards: the "Song of the Year" award, "Best Music Video" for "Nobody" and "Best Female Group". The group also won an award at the 2008 Golden Disk Awards for high digital sales. At the 18th Seoul Music Awards, the Wonder Girls won the Daesang ("Artist of the Year" award), the highest award offered, for "Nobody", in addition to two other awards. In October 2008, the Wonder Girls were signed by the Creative Artists Agency (CAA). By the end of 2008, they had earned ₩12 billion ($9 million US) as a group.

=== 2009–10: Focus on international activities, touring and line-up changes ===
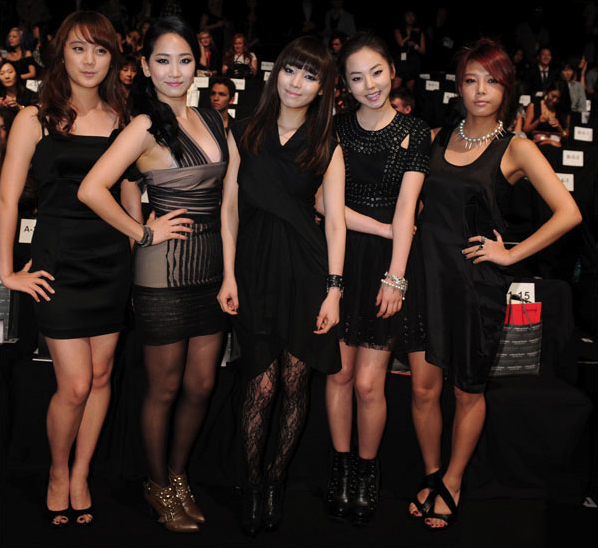
Wonder Girls at the Concept Korea fashion show in New York City on September 8, 2010.

The Wonder Girls tour began on February 28, 2009, in Bangkok, Thailand. Along with their mentor, JYP, they held concerts throughout the United States. The group then returned to South Korea, holding concerts in late March in Seoul and Busan. This tour was documented in the M.net reality show Welcome to Wonderland. Following the tour, the Wonder Girls debuted a music video for "Now", a cover of the Fin.K.L single.

In March 2009, the Wonder Girls confirmed that the group would launch in an English-language music career in the United States with the official release of an English version of "Nobody" in summer 2009. It was later announced that the release would be followed by an English version of "Tell Me", and that an English album would be forthcoming. In June 2009, JYP Entertainment announced that the Wonder Girls would be joining the Jonas Brothers on the North American leg of the Jonas Brothers World Tour 2009. The Wonder Girls were initially signed on for 13 concert dates across the US, but they eventually joined the Jonas Brothers for a total of 45 concert dates. In order to concentrate on their American debut, Sohee and Sunmi dropped out of high school. The English version of "Nobody" was released on June 26, 2009, the day before the start of their tour with the Jonas Brothers. "Nobody" entered the Billboard Hot 100 in October 2009, making them the first Korean group to enter the chart. "Nobody" became the best-selling physical single in the United States in 2009. The song also topped the Taiwan and Hong Kong music charts.

On January 22, 2010, JYP announced that Sunmi would be postponing her musical career to pursue an academic career and that Hyerim, a JYP trainee, would take her place. Sunmi continued as a participating member of the group through February. Sunmi's departure put many of the group's American plans into disarray. The Wonder Girls had been preparing an English album, with six tracks to consist of English versions of Korean singles and the other half of brand new material, initially scheduled for release in February 2010. They were also planning to begin a headlining tour in January 2010; however, due to Sunmi's departure, plans for the tour were delayed and the album was eventually scrapped.

On April 5, 2010, the Wonder Girls announced a 20-show tour of the US and Canada in conjunction with Live Nation, "The Wonder World Tour", which included label mates 2PM for nine dates. The tour consisted of a combination of the English and Korean versions of their songs alongside covers of popular English-language songs. The first leg of the tour began in Washington, D.C., on June 4, 2010. The tour was eventually extended to add an additional leg in which label mates 2AM opened for the group during several dates.

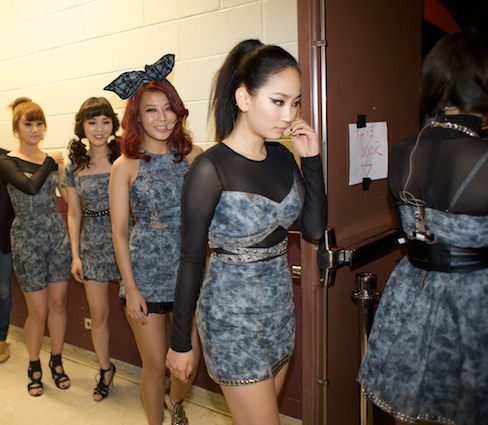
Wonder Girls backstage in New York City in October 2010.

The Wonder Girls followed up their tour announcement with the unveiling of the single "2 Different Tears". The track was recorded in Chinese, Korean, and English and released on May 15, 2010. The music video for the song premiered on YouTube on the same day and was shot in the Gyeonggi Province of South Korea. The video features appearances by Park Jin-young and the Korean-American comedian Bobby Lee. The song was released on an EP of the same name which contains English versions of the group's previous Korean hits "Tell Me" and "So Hot" alongside the previously released "Nobody". During a two-week period, beginning on May 15, the Wonder Girls returned to South Korea to promote "2 Different Tears". They appeared on Mnet's M! Countdown on May 22. On May 27, the group won their first No. 1 award for "2 Different Tears" on M! Countdown. They ended their last week of promotional activities in South Korea by performing on MBC's Music Core on May 29. During this time, the Wonder Girls also appeared on several Korean variety and talk shows, including KBS's Win Win and Happy Together, as well as SBS's Family Outing 2 and MBC's Come to Play.

On July 29, MTV Korea premiered season 4 of Wonder Girls, which introduced their everyday life in the United States and preparations for the MTV World Stage Live in Malaysia 2010. The MTV World Stage Live in Malaysia 2010 was held at the Sunway Lagoon Surf Beach on July 31, and the show was broadcast on August 21 on MTV Asia. On July 30, M.net premiered the reality series Made in Wonder Girls which documented the group's first American tour as well as their promotions in Singapore and Indonesia. On August 3, the Wonder Girls performed in Singapore's SINGfest 2010 at Fort Canning Park.

=== 2011–12: Wonder World and further international ventures ===
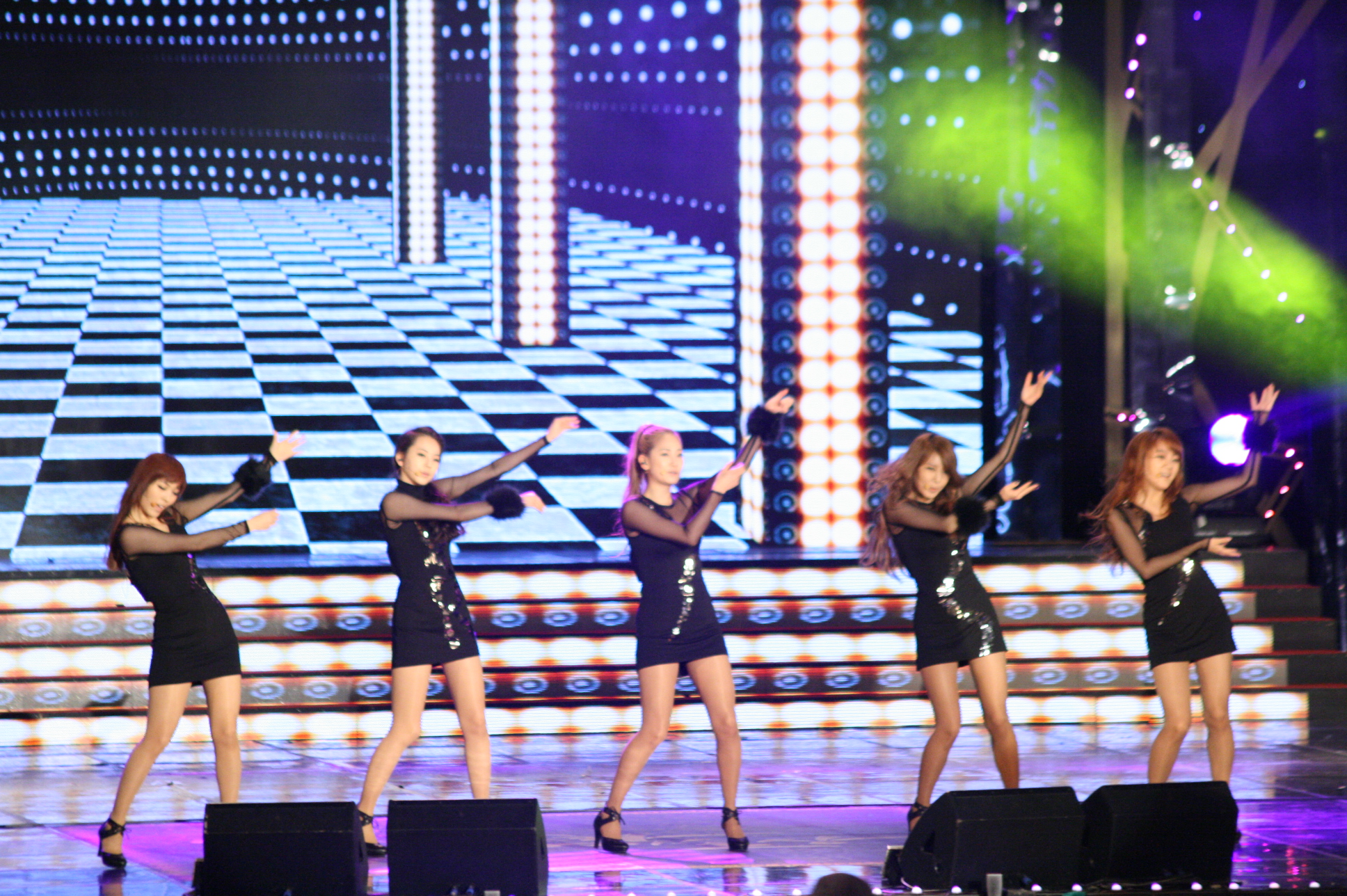
Wonder Girls performing "Be My Baby" at 2011 Korea Entertainment Awards

In early 2011, the Wonder Girls continued to work on their English-language album, collaborating with producers Rodney "Darkchild" Jerkins and Claude Kelly. Rainstone of JYP Entertainment said that the album would be released by one of the three major labels of America. On July 4, the group performed at the 2011 Special Olympics closing ceremonies in Athens, Greece. They performed the traditional Korean folk song "Arirang" along with "Nobody" sung in English and "Tell Me" sung in Korean. On August 5, The Wonder Girls appeared on Billboard.com's Mashup Monday program, performing a self-arranged cover version of B.o.B and Bruno Mars' "Nothin' on You".

On October 9, 2011, a representative from JYP Entertainment revealed that the group's second Korean studio album was forthcoming. On October 23, JYP revealed a new poster, "R U Ready?", hanging over their company's building with a new version of the Wonder Girls' logo. Wonder World was announced as the group's second full-length album and was released on November 7, 2011 along with the single "Be My Baby". The album featured more input from the group members, with Yubin and Yeeun co-writing several songs; Yeeun also provided production. Promotions for Wonder World began with a comeback stage on Music Bank on November 11 and continued through January 2012.

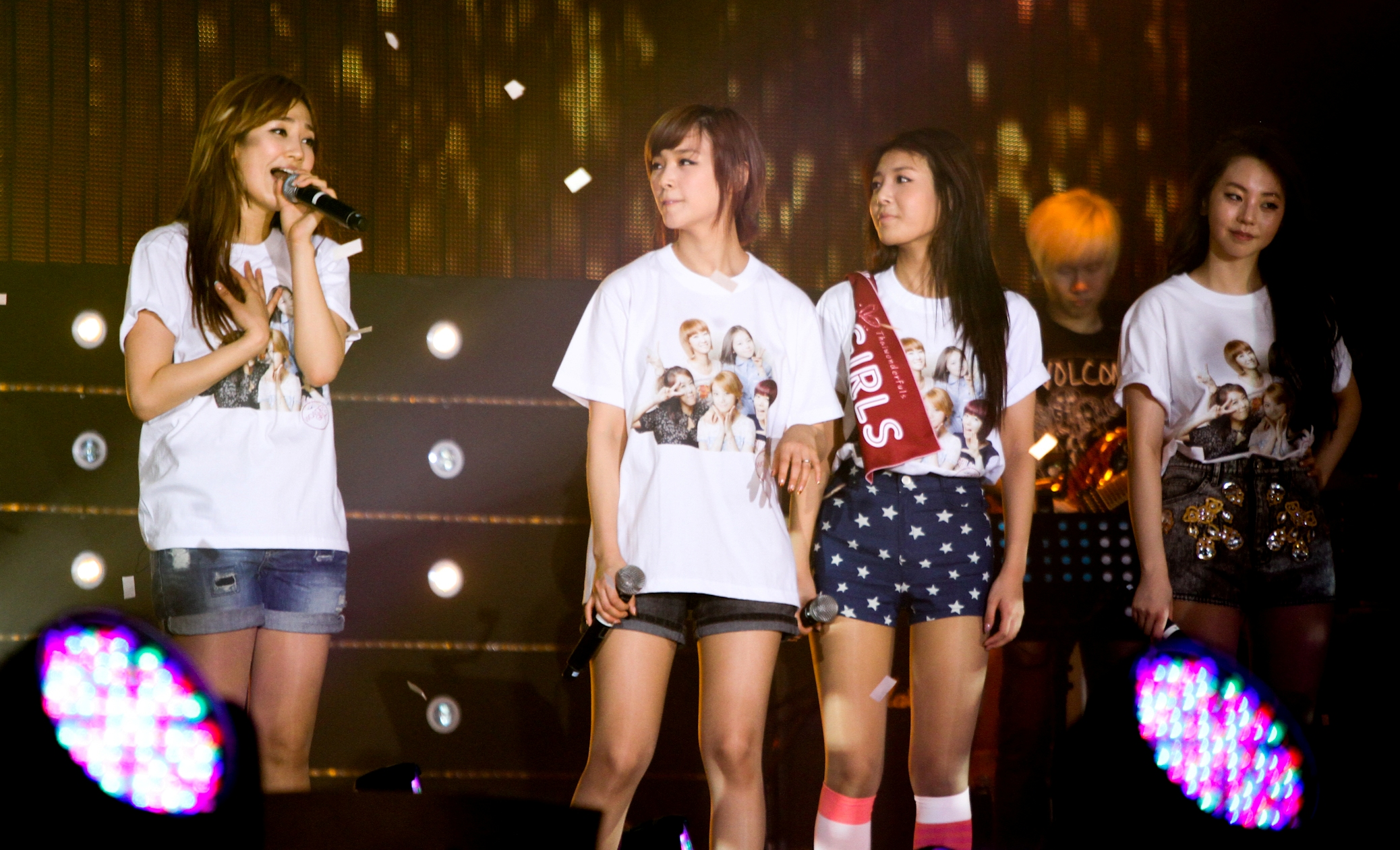
Wonder Girls performing during the Wonder World Tour in Singapore on September 8, 2012.

The group returned to American activities with their made-for-TV movie The Wonder Girls in early 2012. "The DJ Is Mine", an English-language song featuring School Gyrls, was released as a promotional tie-in single for the movie on January 11. "The DJ Is Mine" reached number one on several Korean charts. The movie premiered on February 2 on the TeenNick channel, and featured the then-unreleased English song "Like Money". Following the release of the movie, the group received proposals from major broadcasting companies in the United States, and were in talks concerning full U.S. promotions and activities for their debut English-language album. The twelve-track album was said to have been completed and was scheduled for a summer 2012 release.

On June 3, 2012, the group released the mini-album Wonder Party in Korea alongside the album's lead single "Like This". On July 10, 2012, "Like Money" featuring Akon was released as a single in the United States, in what would become their last completely English-language release as a group. On July 25, the group made their debut in Japan under DefStar Records with the release of a Japanese-language version of "Nobody"; the single release was called "Nobody for Everybody". On September 5, 2012, the group became the first Korean act to hold a concert on iHeartRadio, where they performed three new unreleased songs from their then-upcoming English-language album. On October 29, 2012, Wonder Girls participated in a joint-interview with Nick Cannon in which they discussed the release of their English-language album as well as a new show showcasing the Wonder Girls as a spin-off from their original movie. On November 14, Wonder Girls released the compilation album Wonder Best in Japan, which included a new song, updated versions of older hit songs, and Japanese versions of their songs.

=== 2013–14: Group hiatus ===
Sunye announced in November 2012 that she would get married in January 2013; JYP announced that the group would go on hiatus. The Wonder Girls performed for the last time before their hiatus at the Winter Special Olympics in Pyeong Chang, South Korea on February 5, 2013. Due to the hiatus, plans for the English-language album, an English television series, as well as any future promotions in the United States were entirely scrapped.

Sunye gave birth to a daughter in October 2013. JYP Entertainment stated that she would still remain as a member of the group regardless of her inactive status. In December 2013, Sohee left JYP Entertainment and signed with KeyEast Entertainment to focus on an acting career.

In August 2013, former member Sunmi debuted as a solo artist with the release of the single "24 Hours". In the following year, she released her debut EP entitled Full Moon. On July 23, 2014, it was announced that Yeeun would be making her debut as solo artist under the pseudonym Ha:tfelt (amalgamation of the pronunciation of the word "Hot" and "Heartfelt"). Her debut mini-album Me? was released on July 31, 2014.

=== 2015: Line-up changes and comeback with Reboot ===
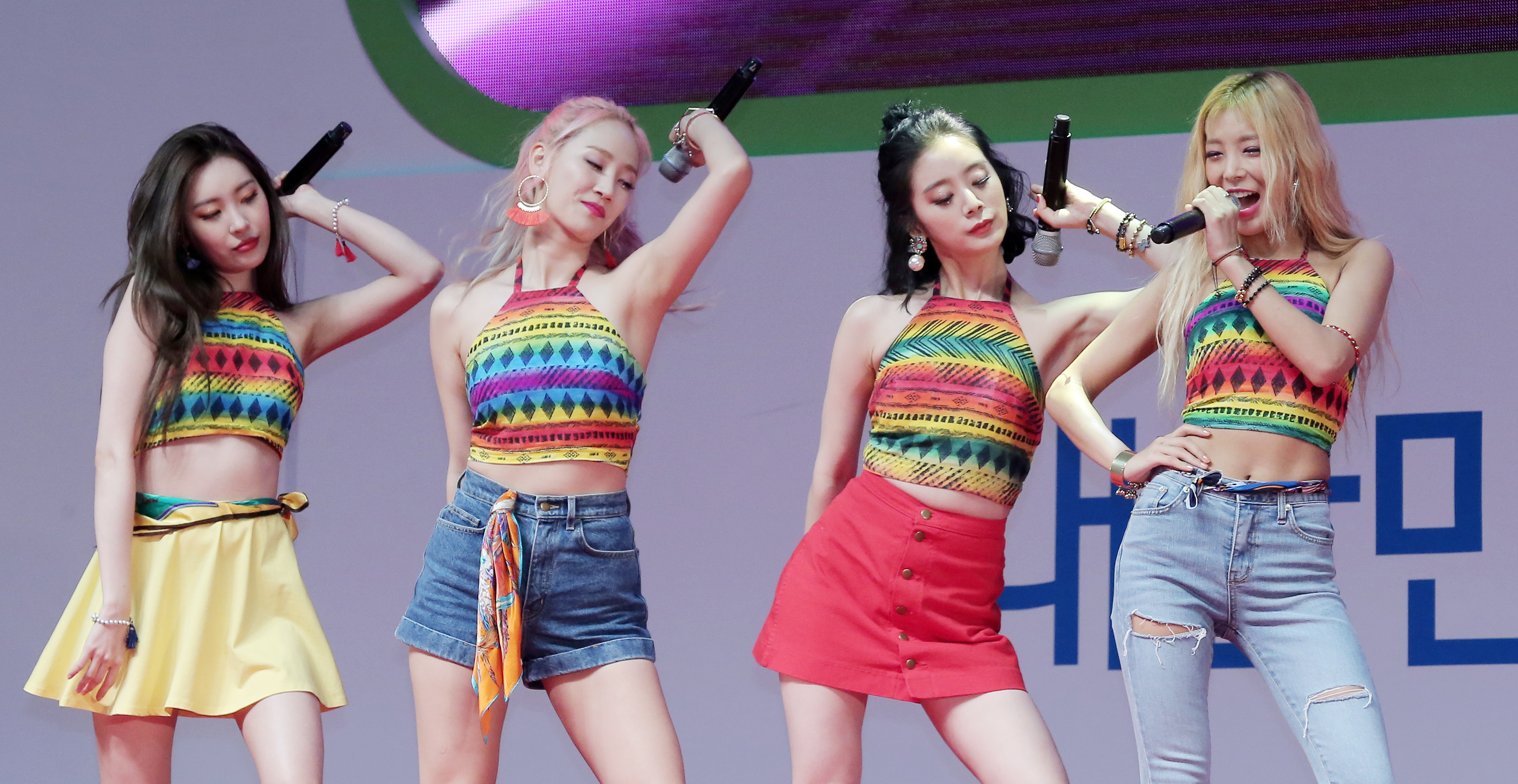
Wonder Girls performing at the launch ceremony for the South Korean Olympic team in July 2016

On June 24, 2015, JYP Entertainment announced that the Wonder Girls would be making a comeback after a three-year hiatus. After being an inactive member of the group since early 2013, Sunye officially announced her departure from the group in July 2015. A representative of the agency confirmed that former member Sunmi would re-join the group for the first time since withdrawing in 2010. The group released the album Reboot on August 3. "I Feel You" was released as the lead single from album on August 2. Rather than solely a dance group, the Wonder Girls returned as a four-member band with each member playing an instrument: Yubin (drums), Yeeun (keyboard), Hyerim (guitar), and Sunmi (bass). Their comeback featured a retro, 1980s sound resonant throughout the album, similar to some of their past releases. Each member participated in the composition and production of the album. The album was a commercial success, peaking at number five on Gaon Albums Chart and number two on the Billboard World Albums chart.

On October 2, it was announced that the Wonder Girls would host an episode of Saturday Night Live Korea. They performed "I Feel You", "Nobody", and "Tell Me". On December 27, they performed at SBS Gayo Daejeon, and on December 31 at 2015 MBC Gayo Daejejeon. Reboot was ranked No. 1 on The 10 Best K-Pop Albums of 2015 by Billboard, and No. 18 on The 20 Best Albums of 2015 by FuseTV. The new foursome lineup also participated the TBS Conan show's "Conan without Borders" special, to where he travels to various countries. In Korea he created a music video with JY Park, Steven Yuen, the Wonder Girls and Twice, based on Conan's popular "string dance" moves that would become a sort of trademark of his. The Wonder Girls starred in the music video as a cameo and as JY Park's backing band.

=== 2016–17: "Why So Lonely" and disbandment ===
On June 18, 2016, the group released "To the Beautiful You" as a limited-release promotional single. On July 5, the Wonder Girls released the song "Why So Lonely", with "To the Beautiful You" and "Sweet & Easy" serving as B-sides, as a CD and as a digital single. The single was commercially successful in South Korea; the digital download topped the Gaon Digital Chart. On July 12, the group performed the dance version of "Why So Lonely" for the first time on SBS MTV's The Show, winning the trophy for that week. This was their first win on a music program since the release of "Like This" in 2012. The group also performed the song at the launch ceremony for the South Korean Olympic team on July 19. By the end of the year, "Why So Lonely" garnered nearly 1,124,000 units in digital sales and was ranked as the 26th best-selling song in the country during 2016.

On January 26, 2017, JYP Entertainment announced that Wonder Girls were disbanding, with only Yubin and Hyerim renewing their contracts while Yeeun and Sunmi decided to leave the company. The group released their final single "Draw Me" on February 10; it also serves as a celebration for their 10th anniversary since debut.

== Artistry and influences ==
=== Musical styles ===
The Wonder Girls are known for their signature retro sound and concept. Their music has been noted to contain elements from the 1960s, 1970s, and 1980s. The Wonder Girls are known as "South Korea's Retro Queens", as their music has been noted to contain elements from the 1960s, such as in their hit "Nobody"; 1970s, such as in the reggae track "Why So Lonely"; and 1980s, heard on the songs "Tell Me", "So Hot", "2 Different Tears", "Be My Baby" and "I Feel You". Their music videos also allude to vintage fashion and performance, with "Nobody" being mostly inspired by African-American 1960s culture and famous R&B group The Supremes, while "I Feel You" takes place in 1987 and shows the members playing their own instruments and various other scenes with heavy 1980s inspiration.

== Impact ==
Wonder Girls ranked number one on Gallup Korea's polls for Singer of the Year for two consecutive years in 2007 and 2008, with "Tell Me" and "Nobody" likewise topping their polls for Song of the Year in 2007 and 2008, respectively. "Tell Me" was voted the number one idol hit of all time in a survey of 22,000 participants conducted by Research Panel Korea in 2013, and was included in Mnet's list of Legend 100 Songs that have captured the public since the 1960s in 2014. Billboard ranked Wonder Girls the third best K-pop girl group of the past decade in 2017, writing how they "dominated South Korea with their modernized retropop sound" with hits "'Tell Me' and 'Nobody' [becoming] some of K-pop's first-ever viral successes". The same publication ranked "Nobody" number 43 in their list of 100 Greatest Girl Group Songs of All Time, deeming its debut on the Billboard Hot 100 "a breakthrough moment in K-pop history". "Nobody" was also ranked as number 27 on Melon's list of the Top 100 K-pop Masterpieces as determined by thirty-five music critics and industry experts in 2021. "Tell Me" was ranked one of the top 10 greatest K-pop songs of all time by Melon (number 9) and Rolling Stone (number 10). In 2022, Us Weekly named them one of the best girl groups of all time.

== Band members ==
The group consisted of five members at the time of its debut in 2007: Sunye, Sohee, Hyuna, Sunmi and Yeeun. Shortly after, in the same year, Hyuna left the group due to concerns over her health, which led to the addition of Yubin as replacement. In 2010, Sunmi left the group to pursue an academic career, and trainee Hyerim was selected as her replacement. In early 2013, following her marriage, Sunye became an inactive member. Sohee departed from the group in late 2013 following the expiration of her contract with JYP Entertainment. Sunye announced her departure from the group in July 2015, alongside a formal announcement from Sohee. For the group's 2015 comeback, Sunmi returned to the group, and served as a member alongside Yeeun, Yubin, and Hyerim; the Wonder Girls remained as four-piece band until their disbandment in 2017.

Final members

- Yubin – rapper, vocalist, drums (2007–17)
- Yeeun – leader, vocalist, keyboards (2007–17)
- Sunmi – dancer, vocalist, bass guitar (2007–10; 2015–17)
- Hyerim – rapper, vocals, guitar (2010–17)

Former members

- Hyuna – rapper, dancer, vocalist (2007)
- Sohee – dancer, vocalist (2007–13)
- Sunye – leader, vocals, dancer (2007–15)

== Discography ==
- The Wonder Years (2007)
- Wonder World (2011)
- Reboot (2015)

== Filmography ==
=== Film ===
Title	Year	Role	Notes
The Last Godfather	2010	Cameo	Performed "Nobody"
The Wonder Girls	2012	Themselves	Television film

=== Television ===
Title	Year	Notes
MTV Wonder Girls	2006–2010	First reality show
Wonder Bakery	2008	Second reality show
Welcome to Wonderland	2009	Wonder Girls documentary
Made in Wonder Girls	2010	Third reality show
Star Life Theater	2011	Reality show documenting their Wonder World comeback

== Tours ==
Headlining

- 1st Wonder Tour (2009–10)
- Wonder Girls World Tour (2010)
- Wonder World Tour (2012)
- Like Money U.S. Tour (2012)

Opening acts

- Jonas Brothers World Tour 2009 (2009)

=== JYP Nation ===
- JYP Nation (2009)
- JYP Nation "Team Play" (2010)
- JYP Nation (2011)
- JYP Nation "Hologram Concert" (2016)
- JYP Nation "Mix & Match" (2016)

== See also ==
- List of best-selling girl groups
