= Welcome to Wonderland (TV series) =

South Korean documentary television series

- Hangul: 웰컴 투 원더랜드
- RR: Welkeom tu wondeoraendeu
- MR: Welk'ŏm t'u wŏndŏraendŭ
- Genre: Documentary
- Country of origin: South Korea
- No. of episodes: 12

Original release
- Network: M.net (in Korean)
- Release: March 6 – April 10, 2009

Welcome to Wonderland (Korean: 웰컴 투 원더랜드) is a 2009 documentary television series about the Wonder Girls daily life which aired on M.net at 6:00p.m. The show first aired on March 6, 2009 and covers their world tour, which began on March 2, 2009 in Thailand, continued as part of the 2009 JYP Tour in the United States, and in South Korea. The documentary detailed the group's performances and choreography, and included a number of behind-the-scenes meetings.

== Episodes ==
No.	Title	Original release date
1	"Episode 1 - A New Beginning (Part 1)"	March 6, 2009
2	"Episode 1 - A New Beginning (Part 2)"	March 6, 2009
3	"Episode 2 - Together (Part 1)"	March 13, 2009
4	"Episode 2 - Together (Part 1)"	March 13, 2009
5	"The 3rd Episode: SHOW HOT (Part 1)"	March 20, 2009
6	"The 3rd Episode: SHOW HOT (Part 2)"	March 20, 2009
7	"Chapter 4 WonderHolic (Part 1)"	March 27, 2009
8	"Chapter 4 WonderHolic (Part 2)"	March 27, 2009
9	"Episode 9"	April 3, 2009
10	"Episode 10"	April 3, 2009
11	"Episode 11"	April 10, 2009
12	"Episode 12"	April 10, 2009
