= Hye-rim =

Name list

- Hangul: 혜림
- RR: Hyerim
- MR: Hyerim

Hye-rim, also spelled Hye-lim, is a Korean given name.

People with this name include:

- Song Hye-rim (1937–2002), North Korean actress
- Kim Hye-lim (born 1985), South Korean sabre fencer
- Hye-rim Park (born 1985), South Korean-born American model
- Jung Hye-lim (born 1987), South Korean hurdler
- Kristie Ahn (born Ahn Hyerim, 1992), American tennis player
- Woo Hye-rim (born 1992), South Korean singer
- Jung Eun-ji (born Jung Hye-rim, 1993), South Korean actress and singer, member of girl group Apink
- Hye Rim Lee (born 1963), South Korean-born New Zealand artist

== See also ==
- List of Korean given names
