= 2 Different Tears =

- From left to right: Yeeun, Sohee, Sunye, Yubin, Hyerim

EP by Wonder Girls
- Released: May 15, 2010
- Recorded: 2009–2010
- Genres: K-pop; dance-pop
- Languages: English; Korean; Mandarin
- Label: JYP
- Producers: Park Jin-Young (exec.); Woo Seok Rhee "Rainstone"; Hong Ji Sang; Mitchell John Dixon; Bag Cham; Ho Yoon Moon "Moonworker"; Jun Soo Nuh; Brian Stanley; Brian Gardner

Wonder Girls chronology
The Wonder Years: Trilogy (2008)	2 Different Tears (2010)	Wonder World (2011)

Singles from 2 Different Tears
- 1. "Nobody (English Version)" Released: September 30, 2009; 2. "2 Different Tears" Released: May 15, 2010

2 Different Tears is an extended play by South Korean girl group the Wonder Girls. The title track was written and produced by J.Y. Park. It was simultaneously released internationally on May 15, 2010, in English, Korean and Chinese. It was the group's first release to feature member Hyelim who replaced former member Sunmi after she departed from the group in February 2010. The EP also contains the 2009 English version of their number one single "Nobody".

== Background and release ==
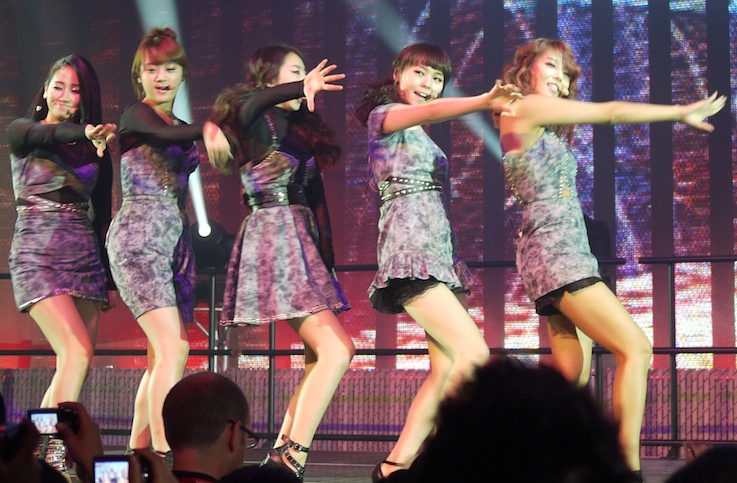
The group performing "2 Different Tears" at the EMP Museum in Seattle during the Wonder Girls World Tour in 2010.

"2 Different Tears" continues the retro theme of the Wonder Girls, including the 1980s inspired "Tell Me" and the 1960s, Motown-inspired "Nobody", by using a disco theme. The concept was created by Sohee and Yubin who describe it as a "more sophisticated and mature, modern feel." The music uses melodies similar to the Hustle. The lyrics speak about remembering a lost love.

Stylistically, the Wonder Girls used a retro 1980s denim look to promote the song as shown on the single cover and in the accompanying music video. The single release also included the English versions of previous singles "So Hot and "Tell Me" and as well as remixes of the title track and "Nobody". After the single was released in Korea, the Wonder Girls embarked on their North American tour.

The EP was released in United States for digital download via iTunes Store on May 15, 2010. The following day, it was released digitally worldwide and physically in South Korea. In June 2010, it was released physically in China and in August 2010 in Philippines through MCA Music and Universal Music Group. An exclusive physical version of the EP was released in the United States in Justice retail stores. The single was promoted through the Wonder Girls World Tour.

== Music video ==
The music video was directed by Jang Jae-hyeok, who had previously collaborated with the group on videos "Irony", "So Hot", and "Nobody". The video was filmed in Korean, English, and Chinese, and features cameo appearances by comedian, podcast host, and actor Bobby Lee and music producer Park Jin-young. The video parodies the classic American television series Charlie's Angels. The group members wear 1980s inspired clothing, make-up and hairstyles.

== Commercial performance ==
The single debuted on South Korea's Gaon Single Chart at number one for the week ending May 22, 2010. "2 Different Tears" stayed at the top of the chart for three consecutive weeks until it was replaced by IU and Seulong's "Nagging" on June 6, 2010. By the end of 2010, the single had sold 2,790,298 digital copies and 28,594 physical copies, becoming the sixth best-seller of the year in the country.

In the United States, the single failed to chart on the Billboard Hot 100 however the album placed at number 21 on the Heatseekers Albums chart on July 7, 2010. In Canada, "2 Different Tears" debuted at number 6 on the Canadian Singles Chart on May 20, 2010.

== Music program awards ==
Song	Program	Date	Ref.
"2 Different Tears"	Mnet's M Countdown	May 27, 2010	

== Track listing ==
- All tracks are in English unless otherwise specified.

2 Different Tears – Standard edition
No.	Title	Writer(s)	Producer(s)	Length
1.	"2 Different Tears"	J.Y. Park "The Asiansoul"	Park; Woo Seok Rhee "Rainstone"	3:22
2.	"So Hot"	Park	Park; Hong Ji Sang	3:00
3.	"Tell Me"	Park; Mitchell John Dixon	Park; Dixon; Rainstone	3:37
4.	"Nobody"	Park	Park; Rainstone	3:34
5.	"2 Different Tears" (Remix)	Park	Park; Rainstone; Sang^{[a]}	3:38
6.	"Nobody" (Rainstone Remix)	Park	Park; Rainstone; Bag Cham	4:21
7.	"Nobody" (Jason Nevins Remix)	Park	Park; Rainstone; Jason Nevins^{[a]}	4:32
8.	"2 Different Tears" (Korean)	Park	Park; Rainstone	3:22
9.	"2 Different Tears" (Chinese)	Park	Park; Rainstone	3:22
10.	"2 Different Tears" (Karaoke)	Park	Park; Rainstone	3:22
11.	"2 Different Tears" (Instrumental)	Park	Park; Rainstone	3:22

2 Different Tears – North American Justice limited edition
No.	Title	Writer(s)	Producer(s)	Length
1.	"2 Different Tears" (Justice Exclusive Version)	Park	Park; Rainstone	3:22
2.	"So Hot"	Park	Park; Sang	3:00
3.	"Nobody"	Park	Park; Rainstone	3:34
4.	"Tell Me"	Park; Dixon	Park; Dixon; Rainstone	3:37
5.	"2 Different Tears" (Remix)	Park	Park; Rainstone; Sang^{[a]}	3:38
6.	"Nobody" (Rainstone Remix)	Park	Park; Rainstone; Bag Cham	4:21
7.	"Nobody" (Jason Nevins Remix)	Park	Park; Rainstone; Nevins^{[a]}	4:32
8.	"2 Different Tears" (Karaoke)	Park	Park; Rainstone	3:22
9.	"2 Different Tears" (Instrumental)	Park	Park; Rainstone	3:22

2 Different Tears – Korean edition
No.	Title	Writer(s)	Producer(s)	Length
1.	"2 Different Tears" (Korean)	Park	Park; Rainstone	3:22
2.	"2 Different Tears"	Park	Park; Rainstone	3:22
3.	"2 Different Tears" (Remix)	Park	Park; Rainstone; Sang^{[a]}	3:38
4.	"Tell Me"	Park; Dixon	Park; Dixon; Rainstone	3:37
5.	"So Hot"	Park	Park; Hong Ji Sang	3:00
6.	"Nobody"	Park	Park; Rainstone	3:34

2 Different Tears – Asian special edition
No.	Title	Writer(s)	Producer(s)	Length
1.	"2 Different Tears" (Chinese)	Park	Park; Rainstone	3:22
2.	"So Hot"	Park	Park; Sang	3:00
3.	"Tell Me"	Park; Dixon	Park; Dixon; Rainstone	3:37
4.	"Nobody"	Park	Park; Rainstone	3:34
5.	"2 Different Tears" (Remix)	Park	Park; Rainstone; Sang^{[a]}	3:38
6.	"Nobody" (Rainstone Remix)	Park	Park; Rainstone; Bag Cham	4:21
7.	"Nobody" (Jason Nevins Remix)	Park	Park; Rainstone; Nevins^{[a]}	4:32
8.	"2 Different Tears" (Korean)	Park	Park; Rainstone	3:22
9.	"2 Different Tears"	Park	Park; Rainstone	3:22
10.	"2 Different Tears" (Karaoke)	Park	Park; Rainstone	3:22
11.	"2 Different Tears" (Instrumental)	Park	Park; Rainstone	3:22

Notes

- ^{^[a]} Signifies a remixer.
- Background vocals on "Nobody" (Rainstone Remix) by Min.

== Charts ==
=== Album charts ===
Chart (2010)	Peak position
South Korean Albums (Gaon)	2
US Heatseekers Albums (Billboard)	21

=== Single charts ===
Weekly charts
Chart (2010)	Peak position
Canada Singles (Nielsen SoundScan)	6
South Korea (Gaon)	1

Year-end charts
Chart (2010)	Position
South Korea (Gaon)	6

== Release history ==
Region	Date	Format	Label	Ref.
United States	May 15, 2010	Digital download	JYP	
South Korea	May 16, 2010	CD	JYP	
Worldwide	May 16, 2010	Digital download	JYP	
China	June 17, 2010	CD	XWX	
Philippines	August 7, 2010	CD	MCA	
