= Be My Baby (Wonder Girls song) =

2011 single by Wonder Girls

Single by Wonder Girls

from the album Wonder World
- Released: November 7, 2011
- Recorded: 2011
- Genre: K-pop
- Length: 3:31
- Label: JYP
- Songwriter: Park Jin-young
- Producer: Park Jin-young

Wonder Girls singles chronology
"2 Different Tears" (2010)	"Be My Baby" (2011)	"Like This" (2012)

Music video
- "Be My Baby" on YouTube

"Be My Baby" is a song recorded by K-pop girl group Wonder Girls for second studio album Wonder World. "Be My Baby" topped the Gaon Digital Chart and became one of the best-performing singles of 2011.

== Release ==
On November 7, 2011, both the music video for "Be My Baby" and their second studio album Wonder World were released.

== Composition ==
"Be My Baby" was written and composed by JYP Entertainment founder Park Jin-young. The song is described as reinterpreting soul music with a modern uptempo. The song is composed in the key C-sharp major and has 165 beats per minute and a running time of 3 minutes and 31 seconds.

== Promotion ==
On November 11, 2011, Wonder Girls held their first comeback stage for the song on KBS's Music Bank, the start of their month-long promotions for the song.

== Accolades ==
Awards and nominations for "Be My Baby"
Year	Organization	Award	Result	Ref.
2011	Gaon Chart Music Awards	Song of the Month (November)	Won	
2012	Golden Disc Awards	Digital song Bonsang	Nominated	

Music program wins
Program	Date	Ref.
Mnet's M! Countdown	November 17, 2011	
Mnet's M! Countdown	November 24, 2011	
SBS's Inkigayo	November 27, 2011	
SBS's Inkigayo	December 4, 2011	
SBS's Inkigayo	December 11, 2011	

== Charts ==
=== Weekly charts ===
Weekly chart positions
Chart (2011)	Peak position
South Korea (Gaon)	1
South Korea (K-pop Hot 100)	1
US World Digital Songs (Billboard)	2

=== Monthly charts ===
Chart (November 2011)	Peak position
South Korea (Gaon)	1

=== Year-end charts ===
Chart (2011)	Peak position
South Korea (Gaon)	33

== Publication lists ==
Publication lists for "Be My Baby"
Critic/Publication	List	Rank	Ref.
Billboard	The 100 Greatest K-pop Songs of the 2010s: Staff List	13	
Spin	The 21 Greatest K-Pop Songs of All Time	18	

== Sales ==
Country	Sales
South Korea (digital)	3,920,000

== Release history ==
Release history for "Be My Baby"
Region	Date	Format	Label
Various	November 7, 2011	Digital download	JYP
