= Ye-eun (name) =

- Hangul: 예은
- RR: Yeeun
- MR: Yeŭn
- IPA: [jeɯn]

Ye-eun, also spelled Ye-un, is a Korean given name. It was the sixth most popular name for baby girls in South Korea in 2008, and ranked ninth in 2009.

== People ==
People with this name include:

- Park Ye-eun (born 1989), South Korean singer
- Park Ye-eun (ice hockey) (born 1996), South Korean ice hockey player
- Kim Ye-eun (born 1996), South Korean actress
- Jang Ye-eun (born 1998), South Korean rapper, member of girl group CLC
- Shin Ye-eun (born 1998), South Korean actress

== See also ==
- List of Korean given names
