= Sunye =

South Korean singer (born 1989)

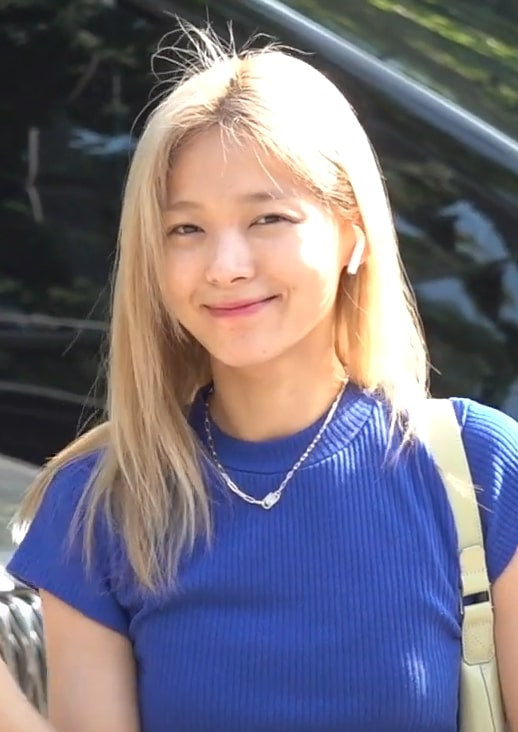
- Sunye in July 2022
- Born: Min Sun-ye; August 12, 1989 (age 37); Seoul, South Korea
- Other name: Sun
- Occupation: Singer
- Spouse: James Park (m. 2013)
- Children: 3
- Musical career
- Genre: K-pop
- Instruments: Vocals; piano
- Years active: 2007–2013; 2018–present
- Labels: JYP; Polaris; Blockberry Creative
- Formerly of: Wonder Girls; M.M.D; JYP Nation

Korean name
- Hangul: 민선예
- Hanja: 閔先藝
- RR: Min Seonye
- MR: Min Sŏnye
- Website: Official website

Min Sun-ye (born August 12, 1989), known professionally as Sunye, is a South Korean singer known for her work as a former leader and main vocalist of girl group Wonder Girls. In early 2013, following her marriage, she became an inactive member of the Wonder Girls and officially departed from the group in July 2015.

Sunye returned to the entertainment industry in August 2018, signing with the company Polaris Entertainment. Sunye made her official solo debut with the EP Genuine on July 26, 2022, after signing with Blockberry Creative, a subsidiary of Polaris Entertainment, in February 2022.

== Early life ==
Sunye was born on August 12, 1989, in Seoul. She attended Korea Arts High School and Dongguk University. In 2001, Sunye was discovered by JYP Entertainment during Park Jin-young's "99% Challenge" project, where she sang and danced. She then trained at JYP Entertainment until she debuted in the Wonder Girls in 2007. Sunye was one of the longest serving trainees at JYP Entertainment, along with Jo Kwon of 2AM and Min of Miss A.

== Career ==
=== Wonder Girls ===
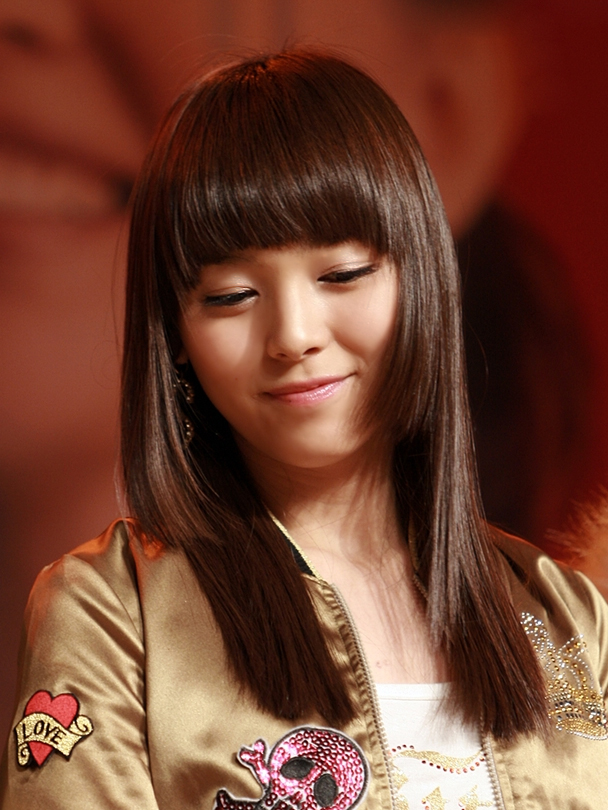
Sunye in 2008

In 2006, Sunye was revealed as the first member of Wonder Girls as the leader and main vocalist. The group, created and managed by JYP Entertainment, released their debut single, "Irony," in 2007. On January 26, 2013, JYP Entertainment confirmed that Sunye would stop her official promotions with the Wonder Girls just before marrying James Park, her Korean-Canadian fiancé. Following the news, the agency reassured fans that the group was not disbanding and that Sunye was not retiring her position as a member of the group regardless of her inactive status.

In December 2014, Sunye stated in an interview with Joongang Ilbo's US branch at a non-profit church concert that she would continue missionary work; this was reported in the press as her leaving the Wonder Girls and the entertainment industry. This was dismissed by JYPE as a misunderstanding, however, in July 2015, Sunye officially confirmed her departure from the group.

=== Singing career ===
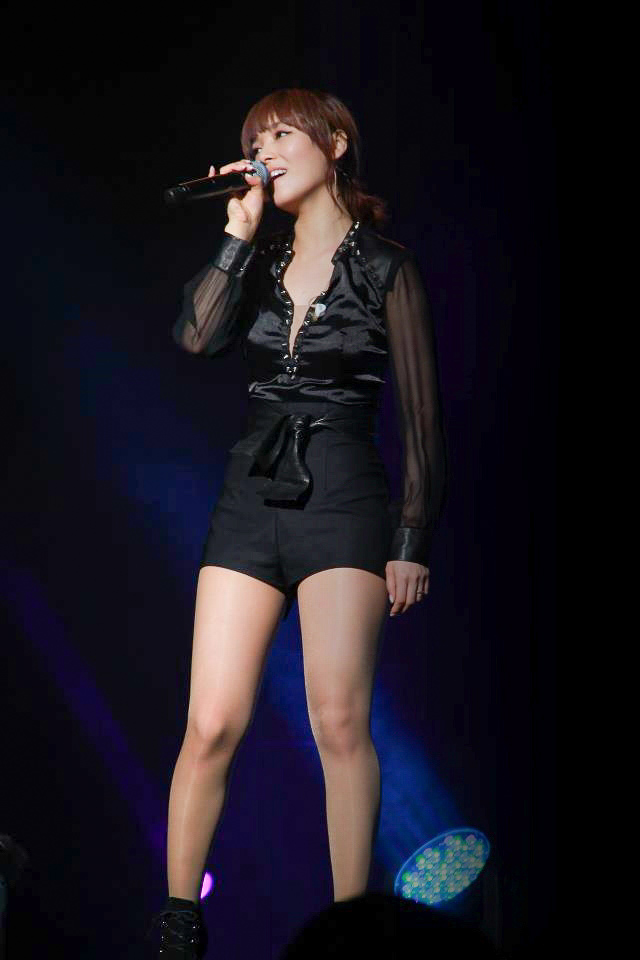
Sunye performing at Wonder World Tour in 2012

Sunye has contributed her vocals on the tracks of various Korean artists, including Mighty Mouth's "Energy" and Park Jin-young's "Afternoon Separation." She recorded the single "Maybe" for the soundtrack of the popular KBS Korean drama, Dream High. In November 2010, Sunye recorded "This Christmas" with her JYP labelmates as the title track for the debut of JYP Nation with a subsequent music video released on December 1, 2010.

In addition to recording collaborations, Sunye has also performed with other artists on stage, including "Stand Up for Love" with Davichi and Taeyeon on SBS Gayo Daejeon in 2008. In December 2008, she performed "Buttons" with Taeyeon, Gyuri, and Ga-in on KBS Music Bank. Sunye and her bandmate Park Ye-eun collaborated with Jo Kwon and Park Jin-young to perform "That's What Friends Are For" on the KBS program Yoon Dohyun's Love Letter. On SBS Inkigayo's 500th Episode, Sunye and Jo Kwon sang the 2AM single "This Song" as a duet.

On August 8, 2018, it was announced that Sunye had signed with Polaris Entertainment and would be making her return to the entertainment industry after her long hiatus.

In 2021, the teaser for reality show Mama The Idol was released with Sunye confirmed as one of the cast members. On December 10, 2021, the first episode of the show aired on tvN. On the January 14 broadcast, members competed for the position of main vocalist which Sunye ultimately won. On January 28, Mamadol then released their debut digital single "Mama The Idol".

In February 2022, Sunye signed a contract with Blockberry Creative. On July 12, 2022, Blockberry Creative announced Sunye's first mini album Genuine, which was released on July 26. It features the lead singles "Glass Heart" and "Just A Dancer"; "Glass Heart" was pre-released on July 19.

On August 28, 2022, Sunye released "My Regards", a collaboration with Jo Kwon.

On June 29, 2023, Sunye announced through her social media account that she had terminated her contract with Blockberry Creative.

== Philanthropy ==
Along with the other Wonder Girls members, Sunye often makes charitable donations to various charities, hospitals, and orphanages around Korea. In September 2010, she made a visit to an elderly man who had secluded himself in the mountains after being a victim to many cases of fraud. According to the producer that followed her, "Sunye prepared clothes, shoes, a radio, food, and various other presents for the man. He hasn't been able to wash in a while so there was a very bad stench coming from him but Sunye paid no attention to it and held his hands tightly, asking him to live a long life. She also prayed for his good health."

In May 2011, Sunye went on a week-long volunteer mission to Haiti, where she cared for children in an orphanage and treated victims of cholera.

On October 16, 2012, Sunye was a guest speaker at George Washington University, where she presented a lecture about K-Pop, "An Idol Star's Illusions and Responsibility." The Korean Cultural Center at the South Korean embassy organized and sponsored the event.

On March 18, 2014, Sunye announced she and her husband would leave for Haiti in July, where they would live for five years to continue doing missionary work. On January 28, 2018, Sunye announced that she had left Haiti after only two and a half years. She explained that she had committed to the missionary work prior to her pregnancy and that she left due to concerns over the health of her child, such as lack of clean water, extreme temperatures, and public safety concerns.

== Personal life ==
Sunye was raised by her grandparents because her mother died when Sunye was a child and her father suffered from a health condition that kept him bedridden. In the fall of 2007, prior to the Wonder Girls' promotions for their single "Tell Me," Sunye's grandfather died. In October 2009, her father was rushed to the intensive care unit after his condition turned for the worse. She took the first flight from New York, where she resided at the time, to South Korea, skipping out on numerous promotional events to be with her father. On June 23, 2010, Sunye's father died due to a chronic illness he had been suffering from for over 20 years.

In 2013, Sunye married James Park. She gave birth to her first daughter, Eun-yoo (Hailey), on October 16, 2013. On April 22, 2016, she gave birth to her second daughter, Ha-jin (Elisha). On January 30, 2019, she gave birth to her third daughter, Yoo-jin (Madison).

Sunye is a Christian.

== Discography ==
=== Albums ===
Title	Details	Peak chart positions	Sales
Title	Details	KOR	Sales
Genuine	Released: July 26, 2022; Label: Blockberry Creative; Formats: CD, digital download, streaming	69	KOR: 1,240

=== Singles ===
Title	Year	Peak chart positions	Album
Title	Year	KOR	Album
"일월지가"	2007	—N/a	Conspiracy in the Court OST
"Maybe"	2011	10	Dream High OST Part 2 (드림하이)
"The Sound of Love"	2012	50	Feast of the Gods OST
"Come to Me"	2012	62	Ohlala Couple OST
"I Love You"	2016	—	United Korea 4 the World
"Password 486" (비밀번호 486) (with Doyeon)	2018	—	King of Mask Singer Episode 165
"First Page" (첫 페이지) (with Jo Kwon)	2020	— (Note: "First Page" did not enter Gaon Digital Chart, but peaked 200 position on the Gaon Download Chart.)	Non-album singles
"Separation in the Daytime" (대낮에 한 이별) (with Im Seulong)	2022	58	Non-album singles
"Love, ing" (열애중)	2022	— (Note: "Love, ing" did not enter Gaon Digital Chart, but peaked 71 position on the Gaon Download Chart.)	Non-album singles
"Glass Heart"	2022	— (Note: "Glass Heart" did not enter Circle Digital Chart, but peaked 90 position on the Circle Download Chart.)	Genuine
"Just a Dancer"	2022	—	Genuine
"Greetings" (안부) (with Jo Kwon)	2022	139	Non-album single
"—" denotes releases that did not chart or were not released in that region.

=== Collaborations ===
Year	Title	Other artist(s)
2007	"Between (사이)"	8eight & Ye Eun & Pdogg
2007	"대낮에 한 이별"	Park Jin Young
2008	"Energy"	Mighty Mouth
2008	"Cry With Us"	Various Artists
2008	"I Love Asia"	Various Artists
2010	"This Christmas"	JYP Nation

== Filmography ==
=== Variety show ===
Year	Title	Role	Notes/Ref.
2007	Show! Music Core	Host along with Sohee & Big Bang T.O.P	
2011	Music Bank	Host along with Sohee & Tim	
2018	Strangers	Cast member	
2018	King of Mask Singer	Contestant	Episodes 165–166
2021	Mama The Idol	Cast Member	

=== Film ===
Year	Title	Role	Notes
2010	The Last Godfather	Herself	Cameo
2012	The Wonder Girls	Herself	

== Theater ==
Year	English title	Korean title	Role	Ref.
2022	Luth	루쓰	Ruth	

== Tours ==
=== Concert participation ===
- 2010 Park Jin-young Bad Party – The Dancer (2010)

== Awards and nominations ==
Year	Award	Category	Result
2011	Mnet Media Awards	Most Charming Lady	Nominated
2013	5th Shorty Awards	Best Singer in Social Media	Nominated
