= So-hee =

- Hangul: 소희
- RR: Sohui
- MR: Sohŭi
- IPA: [sʰoʝi]

So-hee, also spelled So-hui, is a Korean given name.

People with this name include:

== Popular culture ==
- Ahn So-hee (born 1992), South Korean actress and singer, former member of girl group Wonder Girls
- Yoon So-hee (born 1993), South Korean actress
- Han So-hee (born 1994), South Korean actress
- Kim So-hee (singer, born 1995), South Korean singer, member of girl group Nature
- Kim So-hee (singer, born 1999), South Korean singer, member of girl group Alice
- Kim So-hee (born 2003), South Korean singer, former member of girl group Rocket Punch

== Sportspeople ==
- Kim So-hee (speed skater) (born 1976), South Korean short track speed skater
- Yang So-hee (born 1976), South Korean taekwondo athlete
- Jang So-hee (born 1978), South Korean handball player
- Bae So-hee (born 1993), South Korean sport shooter
- Lee So-hee (born 1994), South Korean badminton player
- Kim So-hui (taekwondo) (born 1994), South Korean taekwondo athlete
- Gim So-hui (born 1996), South Korean alpine skier

== Other ==
- Kim So-hee (singer, born 1917), South Korean pansori musician
- Kim Sohyi (born 1965), South Korean chef
- Song So-hee (born 1997), South Korean minyo (traditional folk music) singer
- Sohee Park (born 1996), South Korean fashion designer

== See also ==
- List of Korean given names
