= Miss A discography =

miss A discography
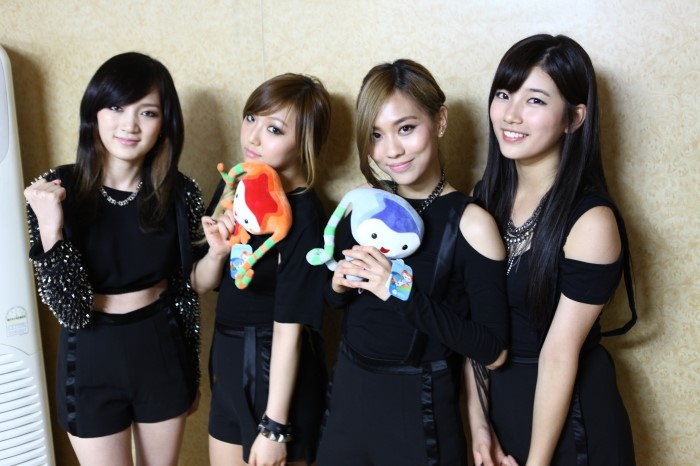
- Miss A in 2012
- Studio albums: 2
- Extended plays: 3
- Singles: 8
- Music videos: 9

The following is the discography of the South Korean K-pop girl group miss A, which consists of two studio albums, three extended plays (EPs) and eight singles.

== Studio albums ==
List of studio albums, with selected details, chart positions and sales
Title	Details	Peak chart positions	Sales
Title	Details	KOR	Sales
A Class	Released: July 18, 2011; Label: AQ/JYP Entertainment; Format: CD, digital download	9	KOR: 36,441; JPN: 3,048
Hush	Released: November 6, 2013; Label: JYP Entertainment; Format: CD, digital download	2	KOR: 15,354; JPN: 1,119

== Extended plays ==
List of extended plays, with selected details, chart positions and sales
Title	Details	Peak chart positions		Sales
Title	Details	KOR	JPN	Sales
Touch	Released: February 20, 2012; Label: AQ/JYP Entertainment; Format: CD, digital download	2	—	KOR: 21,929; JPN: 1,334
Independent Women Part III	Released: October 15, 2012; Label: AQ/JYP Entertainment; Format: CD, digital download	4	175	KOR: 14,272; JPN: 1,375
Colors	Released: March 30, 2015; Label: JYP Entertainment; Format: CD, digital download	3	—	KOR: 12,208; JPN: 595

== Single albums ==
List of single albums, with selected details, chart positions and sales
Title	Details	Peak chart positions	Sales
Title	Details	KOR	Sales
Bad But Good	Released: July 1, 2010; Label: AQ/JYP Entertainment; Format: CD, digital download; Tracks list: 1. Bad Girl Good Girl; 2. Meet Again (딱 마주쳐); 3. Love Again (다시 사랑); 4. Break It	6	KOR: 19,837
Step Up	Released: September 27, 2010; Label: AQ/JYP Entertainment; Format: CD, digital download; Tracks list: 1. Step Up; 2. Breathe; 3. Are You Dazed (멍하니); 4. Play That Music, DJ (그 음악을 틀어줘요 DJ)	6	KOR: 8,306

== Singles ==
List of singles, with selected chart positions, showing year released and album name
Title	Year	Peak chart positions			Sales	Album
Title	Year	KOR	KOR Hot	US World	Sales	Album
"Bad Girl Good Girl"	2010	1	*	—	KOR: 3,352,194	A Class
"Breathe"	2010	2	*	—	KOR: 2,080,423	A Class
"Love Alone"	2011	6	*	—	KOR: 1,075,888	A Class
"Good-bye Baby"	2011	1	1	3	KOR: 3,613,664	A Class
"Touch"	2012	2	2	6	KOR: 2,675,320	Touch
"I Don't Need a Man" (남자 없이 잘 살아)	2012	3	4	5	KOR: 1,714,745	Independent Women Part III
"Hush"	2013	5	4	4	KOR: 972,717	Hush
"Only You" (다른 남자 말고 너)	2015	1	*	6	KOR: 1,284,135	Colors
"—" denotes releases that did not chart or were not released in that region. "*" denotes the chart did not exist at that time.

== Other charted songs ==
Title	Year	Peak chart positions	Sales	Album
Title	Year	KOR	Sales	Album
"Break It"	2010	65	KOR: 162,897	Bad But Good
"Love Again" (다시 사랑)	2010	92	KOR: 113,234	Bad But Good
"Meet Again" (딱 마주쳐)	2010	125		Bad But Good
"Step Up"	2010	34	KOR: 71,171	Step Up
"Are You Dazed" (멍하니)	2010	39	KOR: 89,756	Step Up
"Play That Music, DJ" (그 음악을 틀어줘요 DJ)	2010	41	KOR: 151,104	Step Up
"From 1 to 10" (하나부터 열까지)	2011	11	KOR: 854,360	A Class
"Help Me"	2011	28	KOR: 431,104	A Class
"Mr. Johnny"	2011	48	KOR: 237,161	A Class
"Good-bye Baby (Silver Mix)"	2011	154	KOR: 54,275	A Class
"No Mercy"	2012	20	KOR: 465,985	Touch
"Lips"	2012	44	KOR: 215,241	Touch
"Over U"	2012	52	KOR: 343,557	Touch
"Rock N Rule"	2012	60	KOR: 151,920	Touch
"Touch (Newport Mix)"	2012	133	KOR: 56,256	Touch
"Ma Style"	2012	109	KOR: 69,746	Independent Women Part III
"If I Were A Boy"	2012	114	KOR: 79,780	Independent Women Part III
"Time's Up"	2012	128	KOR: 61,640	Independent Women Part III
"Madness"	2012	142	KOR: 44,366	Independent Women Part III
"Love Is U"	2013	66	KOR: 44,442	Hush
"Come Tonight" (놀러와)	2013	115	KOR: 25,063	Hush
"Hide & Sick"	2013	135	KOR: 18,546	Hush
"Spotlight"	2013	137	KOR: 17,925	Hush
"(Mama) I'm Good"	2013	145	KOR: 16,805	Hush
"Like U"	2013	155	KOR: 15,602	Hush
"Hush (Party Version)"	2013	—	KOR: 9,572	Hush
"One Step" (한걸음)	2015	64	KOR: 41,665	Colors
"Stuck"	2015	70	KOR: 45,020	Colors
"Love Song"	2015	74	KOR: 53,892	Colors
"I Caught Ya"	2015	110	KOR: 29,864	Colors
"Melting" (녹아)	2015	—	KOR: 26,445	Colors

== Music videos ==
List of music videos, showing year released and director
Title	Year	Director(s)
"Love Again"	2010	Unknown
"Bad Girl Good Girl"	2010	Hong Won-ki
"Breathe"	2010	Jang Jae-hyeok
"Love Alone"	2011	Unknown
"Good-bye Baby"	2011	Song Won-young
"Touch"	2012	Cho Soo-hyun
"I Don't Need a Man" (남자 없이 잘 살아)"	2012	Cho Soo-hyun
"Hush"	2013	Naive
"Only You" (다른 남자 말고 너)"	2015	Naive
