= List of songs written by J. Y. Park =

Park Jin-young, also known as J.Y. Park, is a South Korean singer-songwriter and founder of JYP Entertainment. Since 1994 he has written and composed extensively, both for his own solo albums and for other artists, and has often served as songwriter and producer for artists under his agency. He is known as one of South Korea's most prolific songwriters based on royalty earnings. According to the 2013 earnings report published by the Korea Music Copyright Association, Park ranked first in copyright earnings for a third consecutive year. The information below comes from the Korea Music Copyright Association database; Park Jin-young's search ID is W0203000.

Key
†	Indicates songs performed by Park Jin-young

== 1990s ==
=== 1994 ===
Artist	Song	Album	Lyrics		Music		Arrangement	
Artist	Song	Album	Credited	With	Credited	With	Credited	With
Park Jin-young	"Don't Leave Me" (날 떠나지마)	Blue City	Yes	Seo Yun-jeong	Yes	—N/a	No	—N/a
Park Jin-young	"I Want to Ask You" (너에게 묻고 싶어)	Blue City	Yes	—N/a	Yes	—N/a	No	—N/a
Park Jin-young	"My Girl" (마이 걸)	Blue City	Yes	—N/a	No	—N/a	No	—N/a
Park Jin-young	"In Pain" (아픔 속에서)	Blue City	Yes	—N/a	Yes	—N/a	No	—N/a
Park Jin-young	"Behind You" (너의 뒤에서)	Blue City	Yes	Kim Hyeong-seok	No	—N/a	No	—N/a
Park Jin-young	"One-Year Love" (사랑일년)	Blue City	Yes	—N/a	Yes	—N/a	No	—N/a
Park Jin-young	"Are You Still Waiting?" (아직 기다리는지)	Blue City	Yes	—N/a	Yes	—N/a	No	—N/a
Park Jin-young	"Because of Love" (사랑때문에)	Blue City	Yes	—N/a	Yes	—N/a	No	—N/a

=== 1995 ===
Artist	Song	Album	Lyrics		Music		Arrangement	
Artist	Song	Album	Credited	With	Credited	With	Credited	With
Park Jin-young	"Awaited Confession" (기다렸던고백)	Tantara	Yes	—N/a	Yes	—N/a	No	—N/a
Park Jin-young	"Before I Let You Go" (너를 보내기 전에)	Tantara	Yes	—N/a	Yes	—N/a	No	—N/a
Park Jin-young	"Turned Around" (돌아서며)	Tantara	Yes	—N/a	No	—N/a	No	—N/a
Park Jin-young	"Elevator"	Tantara	Yes	—N/a	Yes	—N/a	Yes	—N/a
Park Jin-young	"Forever You & I"	Tantara	Yes	—N/a	No	—N/a	No	—N/a
Park Jin-young	"Farewell" (이별)	Tantara	Yes	—N/a	Yes	—N/a	No	—N/a
Park Jin-young	"Because I First Learned Parting"	Tantara	Yes	—N/a	No	—N/a	No	—N/a
Park Jin-young	"I Can Forget"	Tantara	Yes	—N/a	Yes	—N/a	No	—N/a
Park Jin-young	"Will You Marry Me?" (청혼가)	Tantara	Yes	—N/a	Yes	—N/a	No	—N/a

=== 1996 ===
Artist	Song	Album	Lyrics		Music		Arrangement	
Artist	Song	Album	Credited	With	Credited	With	Credited	With
Choi Yong-jun	"I Love You"	—N/a	Yes	Choi Yong-jun	No	—N/a	No	—N/a
Choi Yong-seon	"나와함께"	Choi Yong-seon	Yes	Choi Yong-seon	No	—N/a	No	—N/a
Insooni	"Again" (또)	The Queen of Soul	Yes	—N/a	Yes	—N/a	No	—N/a
Insooni	"Mi-rae"	The Queen of Soul	Yes	—N/a	Yes	—N/a	No	—N/a
Insooni	"The Love You Speak Of"	The Queen of Soul	Yes	—N/a	Yes	—N/a	No	—N/a
Jinju	"그대가 말하는 사랑"	Sunflower	Yes	—N/a	Yes	—N/a	No	—N/a
Jo Jae-yong	"이제다시는"	—N/a	Yes	—N/a	Yes	—N/a	No	—N/a

=== 1997 ===
Artist	Song	Album	Lyrics		Music		Arrangement	
Artist	Song	Album	Credited	With	Credited	With	Credited	With
Im Sang-a	"No One Can Stop Me" (저 바다가 날 막겠어)	The Day	Yes	—N/a	Yes	—N/a	Yes	—N/a
Jinju	"Everybody"	Sunflower	Yes	—N/a	Yes	—N/a	No	—N/a
Jinju	"Goodbye"	Sunflower	Yes	—N/a	Yes	—N/a	No	—N/a
Jinju	"I Saw" (나는 봤어)	Sunflower	Yes	—N/a	Yes	Bang Si-Hyuk	No	—N/a
Jinju	"I Will Survive"	Sunflower	No	—N/a	No	—N/a	Yes	—N/a
Jinju	"Sunflower"	Sunflower	Yes	—N/a	Yes	—N/a	No	—N/a
Kim Hyun-sung	"제발 돌아가"	Wish	Yes	—N/a	No	—N/a	No	—N/a
Kim Jung-ho	"마지막 이별"	—N/a	Yes	—N/a	No	—N/a	No	—N/a
Lee Ji-hoon	"You're Leaving Me" (그녀가가잖아)	Love and Forever	Yes	—N/a	Yes	—N/a	Yes	—N/a
Lee Ji-hoon	"니가 웃을때면"	Love and Forever	Yes	—N/a	Yes	—N/a	No	—N/a
Park Jin-young	"A Day Goes By" (또 하루가 가고)	Summer Jingle Bell	Yes	—N/a	Yes	—N/a	No	—N/a
Park Jin-young	"She Was Pretty" (그녀는 예뻤다)	Summer Jingle Bell	Yes	Lee Eun-ok	Yes	—N/a	Yes	—N/a
Park Jin-young	"As It Is" (그대로 그렇게)	Summer Jingle Bell	No	—N/a	No	—N/a	Yes	—N/a
Park Jin-young	"You Are Pretty" (그댄 예뻐요)	Summer Jingle Bell	Yes	—N/a	Yes	—N/a	Yes	—N/a
Park Jin-young	"I'm..."	Summer Jingle Bell	Yes	—N/a	Yes	—N/a	No	—N/a
Park Jin-young	"My Love" (내 사랑아)	Summer Jingle Bell	Yes	—N/a	Yes	—N/a	Yes	—N/a
Park Jin-young	"Is It Love?" (사랑인지 뭔지)	Summer Jingle Bell	Yes	—N/a	Yes	—N/a	Yes	—N/a
Park Jin-young	"Shall We Love?" (사랑할까요)	Summer Jingle Bell	Yes	—N/a	No	—N/a	No	—N/a
Park Jin-young	"Summer Jingle Bell"	Summer Jingle Bell	Yes	—N/a	Yes	—N/a	Yes	—N/a
Park Jin-young	"Farewell to Escape" (이별 탈출)	Summer Jingle Bell	Yes	—N/a	No	—N/a	No	—N/a

=== 1998 ===
Artist	Song	Album	Lyrics		Music		Arrangement	
Artist	Song	Album	Credited	With	Credited	With	Credited	With
Jo Trio (조트리오)	"니가 다시 돌아올 그날"	Since 1998	Yes	—N/a	No	—N/a	No	—N/a
Kim Hyun-sung	"우리가 함께했던 시간만으로"	Kim Hyun-sung 2	Yes	—N/a	No	—N/a	No	—N/a
Kim Kwang-jin	"Morning"	My Love My Life	Yes	—N/a	Yes	—N/a	Yes	Bang Si-Hyuk
Lee Dong-gun	"Together" (함께한다면)	Time To Fly	Yes	—N/a	No	—N/a	No	—N/a
Park Ji-yoon	"My Man"	Blue Angel	Yes	—N/a	Yes	—N/a	Yes	—N/a
Park Ji-yoon	"Precious Love"	Blue Angel	Yes	—N/a	Yes	—N/a	Yes	—N/a
Park Jin-young	"Because I Love You"	Even After 10 Years	No	—N/a	No	—N/a	Yes	—N/a
Park Jin-young	"Even After 10 Years"	Even After 10 Years	Yes	—N/a	Yes	—N/a	Yes	—N/a
Park Jin-young	"Every Night"	Even After 10 Years	Yes	—N/a	Yes	—N/a	No	—N/a
Park Jin-young	"Hold Her"	Even After 10 Years	Yes	—N/a	Yes	—N/a	Yes	—N/a
Park Jin-young	"Honey"	Even After 10 Years	Yes	—N/a	Yes	—N/a	Yes	—N/a
Park Jin-young	"When That Day Comes"	Even After 10 Years	Yes	—N/a	Yes	—N/a	Yes	—N/a
Park Jin-young	"날 데려가요"	Even After 10 Years	Yes	—N/a	Yes	—N/a	Yes	Bang Si-Hyuk
Park Jin-young	"뭔가 이상해"	Even After 10 Years	Yes	Kim Jin-pyo	Yes	—N/a	Yes	—N/a
Park Jin-young	"Every Time It Snows" (눈이 올때마다)	Kiss Me	Yes	—N/a	No	—N/a	Yes	Bang Si-Hyuk
Park Jin-young	"Fly With Me" (내게 날아와)	Kiss Me	Yes	—N/a	Yes	—N/a	Yes	—N/a
Park Jin-young	"Jaehoe" (재회)	Kiss Me	Yes	—N/a	Yes	—N/a	No	—N/a
Park Jin-young	"Kiss Me" (feat. sample of "Superstition" by Stevie Wonder)	Kiss Me	No	—N/a	No	—N/a	Yes	Bang Si-Hyuk
Park Jin-young	"Why"	Kiss Me	Yes	—N/a	Yes	Bang Si-Hyuk	Yes	Bang Si-Hyuk
Park Jin-young	"말을 해줘"	Kiss Me	Yes	—N/a	Yes	—N/a	Yes	Bang Si-Hyuk
Park Jin-young	"떠나서"	Kiss Me	Yes	—N/a	Yes	—N/a	Yes	—N/a
Park Jin-young	"헤어지면서"	Kiss Me	Yes	—N/a	Yes	—N/a	Yes	Bang Si-Hyuk
Park Jin-young	"안돼란 말은 안돼"	Kiss Me	Yes	—N/a	Yes	—N/a	Yes	—N/a
Uhm Jung-hwa	"Invitation"	Invitation	Yes	—N/a	Yes	—N/a	Yes	—N/a

=== 1999 ===
Artist	Song	Album	Lyrics		Music		Arrangement	
Artist	Song	Album	Credited	With	Credited	With	Credited	With
g.o.d	"Observation" (관찰)	Chapter 1	Yes					
g.o.d	사랑 일년	Chapter 1	Yes		Yes			
g.o.d	"Wait for Me" (날 기다려줘)	Chapter 1	Yes					
g.o.d	"With Little Men" (작은 남자들과 함께)	Chapter 1	Yes		Yes	Park Joon-hyung, Danny Ahn, Yoon Kye-sang, Son Ho-young, Kim Tae-woo		
g.o.d	"I for You" (난 너에게)	Chapter 1	Yes		Yes			
g.o.d	"To Mother" (어머님께)	Chapter 1			Yes	2Pac and others		
g.o.d	"So You Can Come Back to Me" (니가 다시 돌아올 수 있도록)	Chapter 1	Yes					
g.o.d	"Promise" (약속)	Chapter 1	Yes	Ahn Yong-jin				
g.o.d	"Why Do I Again" (왜 또 다시 난)	Chapter 1	Yes					
g.o.d	"Bad Girl" (나쁜여자)	Chapter 1	Yes		Yes			
Kim Jang-hoon	반지	바보	Yes		Yes			
S.E.S	"Taming a Playboy" (바람둥이 길들이기)	Love	Yes		Yes			
Kim Gun-mo	괜찮아요	Growing	Yes		Yes			
g.o.d	"Love and Remember" (사랑해 그리고 기억해)	Chapter 2	Yes		Yes			
g.o.d	"Dance All Night"	Chapter 2	Yes					
g.o.d	"Take It All" (모두 가져가)	Chapter 2	Yes					
g.o.d	"After You Left Me" (그대 날 떠난 후로)	Chapter 2	Yes					
g.o.d	"Say god"	Chapter 2			Yes			
g.o.d	"Sorrow" (애수)	Chapter 2	Yes	Yoo Gun-hyung	Yes	Yoo Gun-hyung		
g.o.d	"Train" (기차)	Chapter 2	Yes		Yes			
g.o.d	"Friday Night"	Chapter 2	Yes					
g.o.d	"The Story of Five Men" (다섯 남자 이야기)	Chapter 2			Yes			

== 2000s ==
Artist	Year	Song	Album	Lyrics		Music	
Artist	Year	Song	Album	Credited	With	Credited	With
Park Ji-yoon	2000	소중한 사랑	Best (Forever Park Ji-yoon)	Yes		Yes	
Park Ji-yoon	2000	내 남자	Best (Forever Park Ji-yoon)	Yes		Yes	
Park Ji-yoon	2000	Intro	성인식	Yes		Yes	
Park Ji-yoon	2000	달빛의 노래	성인식	Yes		Yes	Bang Si-hyuk
Park Ji-yoon	2000	성인식	성인식	Yes		Yes	
Park Ji-yoon	2000	내가 원하는 남자	성인식	Yes		Yes	
Park Ji-yoon	2000	환상	성인식	Yes		Yes	
Park Ji-yoon	2000	연극	성인식	Yes		Yes	
Park Ji-yoon	2000	꿀	성인식	Yes		Yes	
Park Ji-yoon	2000	그댈 원했지만	성인식	Yes		Yes	
Park Ji-yoon	2000	귀향	성인식	Yes			
Park Ji-yoon	2000	사랑이 시작되기 전에	성인식	Yes			
Park Ji-yoon	2000	떠나는 이유	성인식	Yes		Yes	
Park Ji-yoon	2000	그대 그리고 사랑	성인식	Yes		Yes	
g.o.d	2000	"Fly" (파리)	Chapter 3	Yes			
g.o.d	2000	"One Candle" (촛불하나)	Chapter 3	Yes		Yes	
g.o.d	2000	"I Need You" (니가 필요해)	Chapter 3	Yes		Yes	
g.o.d	2000	"Lies" (거짓말)	Chapter 3	Yes		Yes	
g.o.d	2000	"Come Back" (돌아와줘)	Chapter 3	Yes			
g.o.d	2000	"Dance With Me" (나와 함께 춤을 춰)	Chapter 3	Yes		Yes	
g.o.d	2000	"Why" (왜)	Chapter 3	Yes	Bang Si-hyuk^{[a]}		
g.o.d	2000	"god Party"	Chapter 3	Yes	Park Joon-hyung, Danny Ahn, Yoon Kye-sang, Son Ho-young, Kim Tae-woo	Yes	
g.o.d	2000	"War of Roses" (장미의 전쟁)	Chapter 3	Yes			
g.o.d	2000	"I Don't Know Love" (난 사랑을 몰라)	Chapter 3	Yes			
g.o.d	2000	"If the Love is Eternal" (사랑이 영원 하다면)	Chapter 3	Yes			
g.o.d	2000	"Sky Blue Balloon" (하늘색 풍선)	Chapter 3	Yes	Park Joon-hyung, Danny Ahn, Yoon Kye-sang, Son Ho-young, Kim Tae-woo		
BoA	2000	"Ibyeol Junbi" (이별준비 / Letting You Go)	ID; Peace B	Yes			
Lee Ji-hoon	2001	그녀가 가잖아	Lee Jeehoon Special With...	Yes		Yes^{[a]}	
Lee Ki-chan	2001	또 한번 사랑은 가고	New Story	Yes		Yes	
g.o.d	2001	"Road" (길)	Chapter 4	Yes		Yes	
g.o.d	2001	"Again" (다시)	Chapter 4	Yes		Yes	
g.o.d	2001	"Fool" (바보)	Chapter 4	Yes		Yes	Bang Si-hyuk
g.o.d	2001	"The Place Where You Should Be" (니가 있어야 할곳)	Chapter 4	Yes		Yes	JR Groove
g.o.d	2001	"I Know" (나는 알아)	Chapter 4	Yes		Yes	Bang Si-hyuk
g.o.d	2001	"You Don't Know" (모르죠)	Chapter 4	Yes	Bang Si-hyuk^{[a]}		
g.o.d	2001	"I'm a Man" (난 남자가 있어) (featuring Lim Jeong-hee)	Chapter 4	Yes		Yes	
g.o.d	2001	"Let's Go" (가자)	Chapter 4	Yes		Yes	
g.o.d	2001	"The Reason Why I Can't Leave" (떠나지 못하는 이유)	Chapter 4	Yes		Yes	
Park Ji-yoon	2002	성인식 (remix)	Man	Yes		Yes	
Rain	2002	"Handshake" (악수)	Bad Guy	Yes		Yes	
Rain	2002	"Bad Guy" (나쁜 남자)	Bad Guy	Yes		Yes	Bang Si-hyuk
Rain	2002	"Me" (나)	Bad Guy	Yes		Yes	
Rain	2002	"Can't Get Used To It" (익숙치 않아서)	Bad Guy	Yes		Yes	
Rain	2002	"Baby Baby"	Bad Guy	Yes		Yes	JR Groove
Rain	2002	"Instead Of Saying Goodbye" (안녕이란 말 대신)	Bad Guy	Yes		Yes	
Rain	2002	"Am I Not Good Enough" (나론 안되니) (featuring Hoony Hoon and Hur In-chang)	Bad Guy	Yes	Hoony Hoon (ko)	Yes	Bang Si-hyuk
Rain	2002	"Why" (왜)	Bad Guy	Yes	김기정	Yes	
Rain	2002	"What's Love" (featuring Danny, Lexy, Byul and JYP)	Bad Guy	Yes	Danny Ahn	Yes	
Byul	2002	"December 32" (12월 32일)	December 32	Yes		Yes	
Byul	2002	"Why Don't You Know" (왜 모르니)	December 32	Yes	Yoo Yoo-jin		
Byul	2002	"Like an Idiot" (바보같이)	December 32	Yes		Yes	
Byul	2002	"When I Am Further Away From You" (그가 멀어질 때)	December 32	Yes		Yes	
Noel	2002	노을은 해가 토해낸 피다	Noel (노을)	Yes			
Noel	2002	붙잡고도	Noel (노을)	Yes		Yes	
Noel	2002	아무리	Noel (노을)	Yes			
Noel	2002	인연	Noel (노을)	Yes		Yes	
Noel	2002	"I Know"	Noel (노을)	Yes			
Noel	2002	100일이란 시간	Noel (노을)	Yes			
Noel	2002	니가 돌아온 날	Noel (노을)	Yes		Yes	
Noel	2002	또 한번 사랑은 가고	Noel (노을)	Yes		Yes	
g.o.d	2002	"Like This Again" (이렇게 또)	Chapter 5: Letter	Yes		Yes	
g.o.d	2002	"Letter" (편지)	Chapter 5: Letter	Yes		Yes	
g.o.d	2002	"Report To The Dance Floor"	Chapter 5: Letter	Yes		Yes	JR Groove
g.o.d	2002	"Gimme a Chance" (기회를 줘)	Chapter 5: Letter	Yes		Yes	JR Groove
g.o.d	2002	"0%"	Chapter 5: Letter	Yes			
g.o.d	2002	"A Number I Should Never Have Dialed" (걸어선 안되는 전화)	Chapter 5: Letter	Yes			
g.o.d	2002	"Stutter" (더듬고 있어)	Chapter 5: Letter	Yes	JR Groove	Yes	JR Groove
g.o.d	2002	"As We Release Chapter 5" (5집을 내며)	Chapter 5: Letter	Yes^{[a]}			
Park Ji-yoon	2003	할줄 알어?	Woo~ Twenty One	Yes		Yes	
Park Ji-yoon	2003	DJ (featuring Psy For Yamazone)	Woo~ Twenty One	Yes		Yes	Bang Si-hyuk
Park Ji-yoon	2003	집시여인	Woo~ Twenty One	Yes			
Park Ji-yoon	2003	차마	Woo~ Twenty One	Yes		Yes	
Park Ji-yoon	2003	잘못 (featuring Sung Si-kyung)	Woo~ Twenty One			Yes	Kim Do-hoon
Park Ji-yoon	2003	나 상처 받았어	Woo~ Twenty One			Yes	Bang Si-hyuk
Rain	2003	2003.10.16	Rain 2	Yes		Yes	Kwon Tae-eun
Rain	2003	You Already Knew (알면서)	Rain 2	Yes		Yes	
Rain	2003	난 또 니가 좋은 거야	Rain 2	Yes		Yes	
Rain	2003	내가 유명해지니 좋니	Rain 2	Yes		Yes	Bang Si-hyuk
Rain	2003	How to Avoid the Sun (태양을 피하는 방법)	Rain 2	Yes		Yes	
Rain	2003	아쉬운 빈 공간	Rain 2	Yes			
Rain	2003	안녕이란 말대신	Rain 2	Yes		Yes	
Rain	2003	Even When the Sun Rises (태양이 떠도)	Rain 2	Yes		Yes	
Rain	2004	"Words I Wanted To Say"	It's Raining	Yes		Yes	
Rain	2004	"It's Raining"	It's Raining	Yes		Yes	
Rain	2004	"I Do"	It's Raining	Yes		Yes	
Rain	2004	"11 Days"	It's Raining	Yes		Yes	
Rain	2004	"Quiz"	It's Raining	Yes		Yes	
Rain	2004	"Biggest Thing"	It's Raining	Yes		Yes	
Rain	2004	"Wanna Talk"	It's Raining	Yes		Yes	
Rain	2004	"But I Love You"	It's Raining	Yes		Yes	
Rain	2004	"찾아요" (I'm Searching; Chajayo)	It's Raining	Yes		Yes	
Rain	2004	"To You"	It's Raining	Yes		Yes	
Rain	2004	"I Love You" featuring Noel	It's Raining	Yes		Yes	
Sung Si-kyung	2004	너의 뒤에서	Blue Night's Dream 푸른밤의 꿈			Yes	Kim Hyung-suk (ko)
Noel	2004	언제 어떻게	New Beginning: These Are the Times (아파도 아파도)	Yes		Yes	
Mase	2004	The Love You Need featuring Rashad	Welcome Back	Yes	Mase, Curtis Mayfield	Yes	The Movement (production team)
Will Smith	2005	I Wish I Made That / Swagga	Lost And Found	Yes	R8dio, Jukebox, Kel Spencer, OmArr, Will Smith	Yes	R8dio
Rain	2006	"Sad Tango"	Eternal Rain	Yes	Yu Misaki, Bang Si-hyuk "Hitman Bang"	Yes	Bang Si-hyuk "Hitman Bang"
Rain	2006	"Move On"	Eternal Rain	Yes	Yu Misaki, Bang Si-hyuk "Hitman Bang"	Yes	Bang Si-hyuk "Hitman Bang"
Rain	2006	"Feel So Right"	Eternal Rain	Yes		Yes	
Rain	2006	"Because of You"	Eternal Rain	Yes		Yes	
Rain	2006	"Rain's World"	Rain's World	Yes			
Rain	2006	I'm Coming featuring Tablo	Rain's World	Yes		Yes	
Rain	2006	"With U"	Rain's World	Yes		Yes	
Rain	2006	"In My Bed" (내가 누웠던 침대)	Rain's World	Yes		Yes	
Rain	2006	"Not A Single Day" (하루도)	Rain's World	Yes		Yes	
Rain	2006	"Cassiopeia" 카시오페아featuring Lim Jeong-hee	Rain's World	Yes		Yes	
Rain	2006	"Him & Me" featuring Dynamic Duo	Rain's World	Yes		Yes	
Rain	2006	"Don't Stop"	Rain's World	Yes		Yes	Bang Si-hyuk "Hitman Bang"
Rain	2006	"Move On"	Rain's World	Yes		Yes	
Rain	2006	"Oh Yeah" featuring Ai	Rain's World	Yes		Yes	
Rain	2006	"Friends" featuring Tiger JK	Rain's World	Yes			
Rain	2006	"Me" (나; B-Garage Remix)	Rain's World	Yes		Yes	
Wonder Girls	2007	"Bad Boy"	The Wonder Years	Yes		Yes	Bang Si-hyuk "Hitman Bang"
Wonder Girls	2007	"Good Bye"	The Wonder Years	Yes		Yes	
Wonder Girls	2007	"Irony"	The Wonder Years	Yes		Yes	
Wonder Girls	2007	"It's Not Love" (미안한 마음 ~tears~ Mianhan Ma-eum ~tears~)	The Wonder Years	Yes		Yes	Kwon
Wonder Girls	2007	"I Wanna"	The Wonder Years	Yes		Yes	Woo Seok Rhee "RAINSTONE"
Wonder Girls	2007	"Take It" (가져가 Ga Jyeo Ga)	The Wonder Years	Yes		Yes	Kwon
Wonder Girls	2007	"Tell Me"	The Wonder Years	Yes	Mitchell John Dixon	Yes	Mitchell John Dixon, RAINSTONE
Wonder Girls	2007	"This Fool" (이바보 Ibabo)	The Wonder Years	Yes		Yes	
Wonder Girls	2008	"So Hot"	So Hot	Yes		Yes	
Wonder Girls	2008	"You’re Out"	So Hot	Yes		Yes	
Wonder Girls	2008	"Intro"	The Wonder Years: Trilogy	Yes		Yes	Rainstone
Wonder Girls	2008	"Nobody"	The Wonder Years: Trilogy	Yes		Yes	Rainstone
2PM	2008	"10 Out of 10"	01:59PM	Yes		Yes	
2PM	2008	"Only You"	01:59PM	Yes		Yes	
2PM	2009	"Again & Again"	01:59PM	Yes		Yes	
2PM	2009	"Heartbeat"	01:59PM	Yes		Yes	Rainstone

== 2010s ==
=== 2010 ===
Artist	Song	Album	Lyrics		Music		Arrangement	
Artist	Song	Album	Credited	With	Credited	With	Credited	With
2PM	"Don't Stop Can't Stop"	Don't Stop Can't Stop	Yes	—N/a	Yes	—N/a	Yes	Tommy Park
2PM	"Without U"	Don't Stop Can't Stop	Yes	—N/a	Yes	—N/a	Yes	Tommy Park
2PM	"Thank You"	Thank You	Yes	—N/a	Yes	—N/a	No	—N/a
2PM	"I'll Be Back"	Still 02:00PM	Yes	—N/a	Yes	—N/a	Yes	Sim Eun-ji, Jo Jong-su
2PM	"Still"	Still 02:00PM	No	—N/a	Yes	Hong Ji-sang	No	—N/a
2PM	"Dance2Night"	Still 02:00PM	Yes	—N/a	Yes	—N/a	No	—N/a
Kim Bum-soo	"Passing"	Solista Part 1	Yes	—N/a	Yes	—N/a	No	—N/a
Miss A	"Bad Girl Good Girl"	Bad But Good	Yes	—N/a	Yes	—N/a	Yes	Hong Ji-sang
Miss A	"Breathe"	Step Up	Yes	—N/a	Yes	—N/a	Yes	Sim Eun-ji, Jo Jong-su, Hong Ji-sang
Nine Muses	"No Play Boy"	Let's Have a Party	Yes	—N/a	Yes	Rainstone	Yes	Rainstone
JYP Nation	"This Christmas"	This Christmas	Yes	—N/a	Yes	—N/a	Yes	—N/a
Wonder Girls	"2 Different Tears"	2 Different Tears	Yes	—N/a	Yes	—N/a	Yes	Rainstone
San E	"Tasty San" (feat. Min)	Everybody Ready?	Yes	San E, John Mitchell	Yes	San E, John Mitchell, Super Changddai, Hong Ji-sang	No	—N/a

=== 2011 ===
Artist	Song	Album	Lyrics		Music		Arrangement	
Artist	Song	Album	Credited	With	Credited	With	Credited	With
2PM	"Hands Up"	Hands Up	Yes	—N/a	Yes	—N/a	Yes	Hong Ji-sang
2PM	"Electricity"	Hands Up	Yes	—N/a	Yes	—N/a	Yes	Tommy Park
2PM	"I'm Your Man"	Republic of 2PM	Yes	—N/a	Yes	—N/a	Yes	—N/a
2PM	"Crazy in Love"	Republic of 2PM	Yes	—N/a	Yes	—N/a	Yes	—N/a
2PM	"Take Off"	Republic of 2PM	No	—N/a	Yes	—N/a	Yes	—N/a
Miss A	"Good-bye Baby"	A Class	Yes	—N/a	Yes	—N/a	Yes	Hong Ji-sang
Wonder Girls	"Be My Baby"	Wonder World	Yes	Rainstone	Yes	Rainstone	No	—N/a
Wonder Girls	"Long Long Time"	Wonder World	Yes	—N/a	Yes	—N/a	Yes	Rainstone
Taecyeon, Wooyoung, Suzy, Kim Soo-hyun, Joo	"Dream High"	Dream High OST	Yes	—N/a	Yes	—N/a	Yes	Hong Ji-sang
Kim Soo-hyun	"Dreaming"	Dream High OST	Yes	—N/a	Yes	Gaemi	No	—N/a
Park Jin-young	"If"	Dream High OST	Yes	—N/a	Yes	—N/a	No	—N/a
Sunye	"Maybe"	Dream High OST	Yes	—N/a	Yes	—N/a	Yes	Sim Eun-ji, Hong Ji-sang
Taecyeon, Nichkhun	"My Valentine"	Dream High OST	Yes	—N/a	Yes	—N/a	No	—N/a
IU	"Someday"	Dream High OST	Yes	—N/a	Yes	—N/a	Yes	Sim Eun-ji, Hong Ji-sang

=== 2012 ===
Artist	Song	Album	Lyrics		Music		Arrangement	
Artist	Song	Album	Credited	With	Credited	With	Credited	With
Baek A-yeon	"Sad Song"	I'm Baek	Yes	Super Changddai	No	—N/a	No	—N/a
JJ Project	"Bounce"	Bounce	Yes	—N/a	Yes	—N/a	Yes	Sin Bong-won, Lee U-min, Jo Jong-su
JJ Project	"Hooked"	Bounce	No	—N/a	Yes	Hong Ji-sang	No	—N/a
Lee Hi	"Scarecrow"	First Love	Yes	—N/a	Yes	—N/a	No	—N/a
Jang Wooyoung	"Sexy Lady"	23, Male, Single	Yes	—N/a	Yes	—N/a	Yes	—N/a
Miss A	"Touch"	Touch	Yes	—N/a	Yes	—N/a	Yes	Hong Ji-sang
Miss A	"I Don't Need a Man"	Independent Women Part III	Yes	—N/a	Yes	—N/a	Yes	Hong Ji-sang
Park Jin-young	"Movie Star"	Movie Star	Yes	—N/a	Yes	—N/a	Yes	Hong Ji-sang
Park Jin-young	"Feel So Good"	Spring	Yes	—N/a	Yes	—N/a	Yes	Hong Ji-sang
Park Jin-young	"Last Love"	Spring	Yes	—N/a	Yes	—N/a	No	—N/a
Park Jin-young	"Please"	Spring	Yes	—N/a	Yes	—N/a	No	—N/a
Park Jin-young	"Someone Else"	Spring	Yes	—N/a	Yes	—N/a	Yes	Sim Eun-ji, Hong Ji-sang
Park Jin-young	"You're The One"	Spring	Yes	—N/a	Yes	—N/a	No	—N/a
Park Jin-young, Taecyeon, Wooyoung, Suzy	"Classic"	Classic	Yes	—N/a	Yes	—N/a	Yes	Hong Ji-sang
Seven	"When I Can't Sing"	Seven New Mini Album	Yes	—N/a	Yes	—N/a	Yes	Hong Ji-sang
Wonder Girls	"Like This"	Wonder Party	Yes	—N/a	Yes	—N/a	Yes	Hong Ji-sang
JB, Park Seo-joon	"New Dreaming"	Dream High 2 OST	Yes	Hong Ji-sang	No	—N/a	No	—N/a
Lee Ki-chan	"Sick of Hope"	Dream High 2 OST	Yes	Hong Ji-sang	No	—N/a	No	—N/a
Park Jin-Young	"B-Class Life"	Dream High 2 OST	Yes	—N/a	Yes	—N/a	No	—N/a
Park Jin-Young	"Falling"	Dream High 2 OST	Yes	—N/a	Yes	—N/a	Yes	Sim Eun-ji, Hong Ji-sang
Park Jin-Young	"Together"	Dream High 2 OST	Yes	—N/a	Yes	—N/a	No	—N/a

=== 2013 ===
Artist	Song	Album	Lyrics		Music		Arrangement	
Artist	Song	Album	Credited	With	Credited	With	Credited	With
2PM	"Beautiful"	Legend of 2PM	Yes	—N/a	Yes	—N/a	Yes	—N/a
2PM	"So Bad"	Legend of 2PM	Yes	—N/a	Yes	—N/a	Yes	—N/a
2PM	"SOS Man"	Legend of 2PM	Yes	—N/a	Yes	—N/a	Yes	—N/a
2PM	"Comeback When You Hear This Song"	Grown	Yes	—N/a	Yes	—N/a	Yes	Hong Ji-sang
2PM	"A.D.T.O.Y."	Grown	Yes	—N/a	Yes	—N/a	Yes	Hong Ji-sang
Ivy	"I Dance"	I Dance	Yes	—N/a	Yes	—N/a	Yes	Tommy Park
Park Jin-Young	"Had Enough Parties"	Halftime	Yes	—N/a	Yes	—N/a	Yes	Hong Ji-sang
Park Jin-Young	"Halftime"	Halftime	Yes	—N/a	Yes	—N/a	Yes	Hong Ji-sang
Park Jin-Young	"Love is the Best" (feat. Namgung Songok, Gaeko)	Halftime	Yes	Gaeko	Yes	—N/a	Yes	Hong Ji-sang
Park Jin-Young	"Mingle Mingle"	Halftime	Yes	—N/a	Yes	—N/a	Yes	Hong Ji-sang
Park Jin-Young	"She Doesn't Know	Halftime	Yes	—N/a	Yes	—N/a	Yes	Lee U-min
Sunmi	"24 Hours"	Full Moon	Yes	—N/a	Yes	—N/a	No	—N/a

=== 2014 ===
Artist	Song	Album	Lyrics		Music		Arrangement	
Artist	Song	Album	Credited	With	Credited	With	Credited	With
2AM	"Days Like These"	Let's Talk	Yes	—N/a	Yes	—N/a	No	—N/a
2PM	"Beautiful" (Korean version)	Go Crazy!	Yes	—N/a	Yes	—N/a	Yes	Hong Ji-sang
2PM	"I'm Your Man" (Korean version)	Go Crazy!	Yes	—N/a	Yes	Super Changddai	No	—N/a
15&	"Can't Hide It"	Sugar	Yes	—N/a	Yes	—N/a	Yes	Hong Ji-sang
Bernard Park	"I'm..."	I'm...	Yes	—N/a	Yes	—N/a	No	—N/a
Gain	"Q&A" (feat. Jo Kwon)	Truth or Dare	Yes	—N/a	Yes	—N/a	No	—N/a
g.o.d	"5+4+1+5=15"	Chapter 8	Yes	g.o.d, Tupac Shakur, Johnny Lee Jackson, Joseph Banks Jefferson, Charles B. Simmons	Yes	Bang Si-Hyuk, Tupac Shakur, Johnny Lee Jackson, Joseph Banks Jefferson, Charles B. Simmons	No	—N/a
g.o.d	"An Ordinary Day"	Chapter 8	Yes	—N/a	Yes	—N/a	No	—N/a
Got7	"A"	Got Love	Yes	—N/a	Yes	—N/a	No	—N/a
Got7	"Girls Girls Girls"	Got It?	Yes	—N/a	Yes	—N/a	Yes	Hong Ji-sang
Got7	"I Like You"	Got It?	Yes	—N/a	Yes	—N/a	Yes	Hong Ji-sang
Got7	"Stop Stop It"	Identify	Yes	—N/a	Yes	—N/a	Yes	Hong Ji-sang

=== 2015 ===
Artist	Song	Album	Lyrics		Music		Arrangement	
Artist	Song	Album	Credited	With	Credited	With	Credited	With
Got7	"Just Right"	Just Right	Yes	—N/a	No	—N/a	No	—N/a
Got7	"Confession Song"	Mad	Yes	Crucial Star	Yes	—N/a	Yes	Lee To-yo
Got7	"Put Your Hands Up"	Mad	Yes	Jo Min-hyeong	Yes	Jo Min-hyeong	Yes	Armadillo, Kim Seung-su
Park Ji-min	"Hopeless Love"	Hopeless Love	Yes	—N/a	No	—N/a	No	—N/a
Park Jin-Young	"All I Need" (feat. P-Type)	All I Need	Yes	P-Type	Yes	—N/a	Yes	Armadillo, Kim Seung-su
Park Jin-Young	"I'm So Sexy" (with Yoo Jae-suk)	Infinite Challenge: Yeongdong Expressway Music Festival	Yes	—N/a	Yes	—N/a	Yes	—N/a
Park Jin-Young	"Behind Closed Doors"	24/34	Yes	—N/a	Yes	—N/a	Yes	Hong Ji-sang
Park Jin-Young	"Who's Your Mama?" (feat. Jessi)	24/34	Yes	Jessi, J'Kyun	Yes	—N/a	Yes	Armadillo, Kim Seung-su
Park Jin-Young, Lee Jin-ah	"Road to the Airport"	Sing The Road	Yes	—N/a	Yes	—N/a	Yes	Armadillo, Kim Seung-su
Park Jin-Young, Jung Seung-hwan	"Jamsu Bridge"	Sing The Road	Yes	—N/a	Yes	—N/a	No	—N/a
Twice	"Do It Again"	The Story Begins	Yes	—N/a	Yes	Glen Choi, John Stary	No	—N/a
Wonder Girls	"I Feel You"	Reboot	Yes	—N/a	Yes	Jeong Ho-hyeon, Choe Hyeon-jun	Yes	Hong Ji-sang

=== 2016 ===
Artist	Song	Album	Lyrics		Music		Arrangement	
Artist	Song	Album	Credited	With	Credited	With	Credited	With
Fei	"Fantasy"	Fantasy	Yes	—N/a	Yes	Ryan S. Jhun, Denzil Remedios	No	—N/a
Fei	"Sweet Sexy Fei"	Fantasy	Yes	—N/a	Yes	—N/a	Yes	Hong Ji-sang
Hyoyeon, Min, Jo Kwon	"Born To Be Wild" (feat. Park Jin-young)	Born To Be Wild	Yes	—N/a	Yes	Lee To-yo	Yes	Lee To-yo
I.O.I	"Very Very Very"	Miss Me?	Yes	—N/a	Yes	—N/a	Yes	Armadillo, Kim Seung-su
JYP Nation	"Encore"	Encore	Yes	Yubin, Jackson Wang, Hyelim, Kim Yu-gyeom	Yes	—N/a	Yes	Armadillo, Kim Seung-su
Park Jin-Young	"Fire" (feat. Conan O'Brien, Steven Yeun, Park Ji-min)	Still Alive	Yes	—N/a	Yes	—N/a	Yes	Armadillo, Kim Seung-su
Park Jin-Young	"Still Alive"	Still Alive	Yes	—N/a	Yes	—N/a	Yes	Hong Ji-sang
Twice	"I'm Gonna Be A Star"	Page Two	Yes	Olltii	Yes	Frants, Bruce Vanderveer, Ebony Rae	No	—N/a
Twice	"Precious Love"	Page Two	Yes	—N/a	Yes	—N/a	No	—N/a
Unnies	"Shut Up" (feat. You Hee-yeol)	Sister's Slam Dunk	Yes	Jessica H.O	Yes	Yoo Gun-hyung	Yes	Yoo Gun-hyung

=== 2017 ===
Artist	Song	Album	Lyrics		Music		Arrangement	
Artist	Song	Album	Credited	With	Credited	With	Credited	With
Baek A-yeon	"Just Friends"	Bittersweet	Yes	Park U-sang	No	—N/a	No	—N/a
Boy Story	"How Old R U"	Enough	Yes	—N/a	Yes	Big Tone, EJ Show, David Anthony	Yes	Armadillo, Kim Seung-su
Got7	"Never Ever"	Flight Log: Arrival	Yes	Kim Jong-myeong, Hwang Yu-geun, Ear Attack	Yes	Kim Jong-myeong, Hwang Yu-geun, Ear Attack, O Seon-ho	No	—N/a
JJ Project	"Tomorrow, Today"	Verse 2	Yes	JB, Park Jin-young	No	—N/a	No	—N/a
Park Jin-Young, Heize	"Regrets"	Blue & Red	Yes	—N/a	Yes	—N/a	Yes	Armadillo, Kim Seung-su, Kairos
Psy	"Bomb" (feat. B.I, Bobby)	4X2=8	Yes	Psy, B.I, Bobby	Yes	Psy, B.I, Bobby, Yoo Gun-hyung	Yes	Yoo Gun-hyung
Suzy	"Yes No Maybe"	Yes? No?	Yes	—N/a	Yes	Kairos	Yes	Kim Seung-su
Twice	"Merry & Happy"	Merry & Happy	Yes	—N/a	No	—N/a	No	—N/a
Twice	"Signal"	Signal	Yes	—N/a	Yes	Kairos	Yes	Armadillo, Kim Seung-su, Kairos

=== 2018 ===
Artist	Song	Album	Lyrics		Music		Arrangement	
Artist	Song	Album	Credited	With	Credited	With	Credited	With
Twice	"What Is Love?"	What Is Love?	Yes	—N/a	Yes	—N/a	No	Lee Woo-min "collapsedone"
Twice	"BDZ"	BDZ	Yes	—N/a	Yes	—N/a	Yes	—N/a
Twice	"The Best Thing I Ever Did"	The Year of "Yes"	Yes	—N/a	Yes	—N/a	Yes	—N/a
Stray Kids	"My Pace"	I Am Who	Yes	3RACHA	No	—N/a	No	—N/a
Boy Story	"Enough"	Enough	Yes	—N/a	Yes	—N/a	Yes	—N/a
Day6	"Chocolate"	Want More 19 OST	Yes	—N/a	No	—N/a	No	—N/a
Got7	"Miracle"	Present: You & Me	Yes	—N/a	No	—N/a	No	—N/a
Got7	"Take me to you"	Present: You & Me	Yes	—N/a	No	—N/a	No	—N/a
Fei	"Hello" (feat Jackson Wang)	Non-album single	Yes	—N/a	No	—N/a	No	—N/a

=== 2019 ===
Artist	Song	Album	Lyrics		Music		Arrangement	
Artist	Song	Album	Credited	With	Credited	With	Credited	With
g.o.d	"Leave That Man"	Then & Now	Yes	—N/a	Yes	—N/a	Yes	Kim Seung-su, Armadillo
Got7	"Zero"	I Won’t Let You Go	Yes	—N/a	Yes	—N/a	No	—N/a
Got7	"Eclipse"	Spinning Top	Yes	—N/a	No	—N/a	No	—N/a
Got7	"You Calling My Name" (니가 부르는 나의 이름)	Call My Name	Yes	—N/a	No	—N/a	No	—N/a
Park Jin-Young	"꽉 잡은 이 손 (This small hand)"	Non-album single	Yes	—N/a	Yes	—N/a	Yes	—N/a
Park Jin-Young	"Fever"(feat. Superbee, BIBI)	Non-album single	Yes	—N/a	Yes	—N/a	Yes	—N/a
Itzy	"Icy"	It'z Icy	Yes	Penomeco	Yes	Cazzi Opeia, Ellen Berg Tollbom, Daniel Caesar, Ludwig Lindell, Ashley Alisha (Joombas), Cameron Neilson, Lauren Dyson	Yes	Lee Has-seul
Twice	"Feel Special"	Feel Special	Yes	—N/a	Yes	Ollipop, Hayley Aitken	No	-
Brown Eyed Girls	"Invitation" (feat. Uhm Jung-hwa)	RE_vive	Yes	—N/a	Yes	—N/a	No	—N/a
Stray Kids	"Levanter"	Clé: Levanter	Yes	3Racha, Herz Analog	No	—N/a	No	—N/a

== 2020s ==
=== 2020 ===
Artist	Song	Album	Lyrics		Music		Arrangement	
Artist	Song	Album	Credited	With	Credited	With	Credited	With
Got7	"Not By The Moon"	Dye	Yes	Lee Seu-ran	Yes	Aaron Kim, Okiro, Isaac Han, Rudi Daouk, Jakob Mihoubi	Yes	—N/a
Twice	"More & More"	More & More	Yes	Bibi	No	—N/a	Yes	—N/a
Twice	"I Can't Stop Me"	Eyes Wide Open	Yes	Shim Eunji	No	—N/a	No	—N/a
Twice	"Cry For Me"	Non-album single	Yes	Heize	No	—N/a	No	—N/a
NiziU	"Make You Happy"	Make You Happy	Yes	Yuka Matsumoto	Yes	Lee Hae-sol	Yes	—N/a
NiziU	"Baby I'm a Star"	Make You Happy	Yes	Yui Kimura	Yes	—N/a	Yes	—N/a
NiziU	"Step and a Step"	Non-album single	Yes	Kentz, Yui Kimura	Yes	—N/a	Yes	—N/a
Itzy	"Not Shy"	Not Shy	Yes	—N/a	No	—N/a	Yes	—N/a
Park Jin-young & Sunmi	"When We Disco"	Non-album single	Yes	—N/a	Yes	—N/a	Yes	Lee Hae-sol
Stray Kids	"All In"	All In	Yes	3Racha, KM-MARKIT	Yes	3Racha	Yes	—N/a
Stray Kids	"All In" (Korean ver.)	Non-album single	Yes	3Racha	Yes	3Racha	Yes	Lee Hae-sol
Jun. K	"30 Minutes Might Be Too Long"	20 Minutes	Yes	Jun. K	No	—N/a	No	—N/a
Park Jin-young & Rain	"Switch to Me"	Non-album single	Yes	—N/a	Yes	—N/a	Yes	Hong Ji-sang

=== 2021 ===
Artist	Song	Album	Lyrics		Music		Arrangement	
Artist	Song	Album	Credited	With	Credited	With	Credited	With
Park Jin-young	"Corny Love Song (by Yoyomi)"	Non-album single	Yes	—N/a	Yes	—N/a	No	—N/a
Itzy	"In the Morning"	Guess Who	Yes	KASS, danke, LYRE	Yes	earattack, KASS, Lee Hae-sol	Yes	Lee Hae-sol, earattack
Twice	"Kura Kura"	Perfect World	Yes	—N/a	No	—N/a	No	—N/a
Twice	"Alcohol-Free"	Taste of Love	Yes	—N/a	Yes	—N/a	Yes	Lee Hae-sol
2AM	"No Good in Good-Bye"	Ballad 21 F/W	Yes	—N/a	Yes	—N/a	No	—N/a
NiziU	"Take a Picture"	U	Yes	—N/a	Yes	—N/a	No	—N/a
NiziU	"Chopstick"	U	Yes	Yuka Matsumoto	Yes	—N/a	Yes	Lee Hae-Sol

=== 2022 ===
Artist	Song	Album	Lyrics		Music		Arrangement	
Artist	Song	Album	Credited	With	Credited	With	Credited	With
Twice	"Celebrate"	Celebrate	Yes	Twice, Co-sho	No	—N/a	No	—N/a
Park Jin-young	"Groove Back" feat. Gaeko	Non-album single	Yes	Gaeko	Yes	—N/a	Yes	Lee Hae-sol
Babylon	"Rain" (비가 와)	Ego 90's	Yes	Babylon	No	—N/a	No	—N/a
Jo Kwon, Sunye	"Greetings" (안부)	Non-album single	Yes	—N/a	Yes	—N/a	No	—N/a

=== 2023 ===
Artist	Song	Album	Lyrics		Music		Arrangement	
Artist	Song	Album	Credited	With	Credited	With	Credited	With
NiziU	"Coconut"	Coconut	Yes	Mayu Wakisaka	No	—N/a	No	—N/a
Nmixx	"Party O'Clock"	A Midsummer Nmixx's Dream	Yes	Lee Seu-ran, Danke 1, Danke 2, Danke 3, Hwang Yu-bin, WKLY, DR.JO, Oh Hyeon-seon (lalala studio)	Yes	Harry Sommerdahl, Paulina Cerrilla, Josefin Anja Glenmark Breman, Fabian Petter Torsson	No	—N/a
MiSaMo	"Do Not Touch"	Masterpiece	Yes	Mayu Wakisaka	No	—N/a	No	—N/a
Itzy	"Bet On Me"	Kill My Doubt	Yes	12H51M 랑, 12H51M 진, 12H51M 송	No	—N/a	No	—N/a
Jihyo	"Killin' Me Good"	Zone	Yes	—N/a	No	—N/a	Yes	—N/a
Vcha	"Y.O.Universe"	SeVit (New Light)	Yes	Madison Love, Cirkut, LosHendrix	Yes	Madison Love, Cirkut, LosHendrix	No	—N/a
Vcha	"Know Me Like That"	SeVit (New Light)	Yes	Jessica Agombar, David Stewart	Yes	Jessica Agombar, David Stewart	No	—N/a
Vcha	"Go Getter"	SeVit (New Light)	Yes	Nathan Cunningham, Marc Sibley, DEZA, Hadar Adora	Yes	Nathan Cunningham, Marc Sibley, DEZA, Hadar Adora	No	—N/a
Vcha	"Ready for the World"	Non-album single	Yes	—N/a	Yes	—N/a	Yes	—N/a
NiziU	"Heartris"	Press Play	Yes	Lil June, Jeong Na-kyung	No	—N/a	No	—N/a
Park Jin-young	"Changed Man"	Non-album single	Yes	—N/a	Yes	Boy Matthews, Nathan Cunningham, Marc Sibley	No	—N/a
Nexz	"Miracle"	Non-album single	Yes	—N/a	Yes	—N/a	Yes	—N/a

=== 2024 ===
Artist	Song	Album	Lyrics		Music		Arrangement	
Artist	Song	Album	Credited	With	Credited	With	Credited	With
Park Jin-young, Stray Kids, Itzy & Nmixx	"Like Magic"	Non-album single	Yes	—N/a	Yes	—N/a	Yes	—N/a
Hyuna	"RSVP" (featuring Changmo)	Attitude	No	—N/a	Yes	—N/a	No	—N/a
Nayeon	"ABCD"	Na	Yes	Rick Bridges	No	—N/a	No	—N/a
Nexz	"Keep On Moving"	Ride the Vibe (Japanese Ver.) / Keep on moving	Yes	—N/a	No	—N/a	No	—N/a
Nexz	"Here & Now"	Ride the Vibe (Japanese Ver.) / Keep on moving	Yes	—N/a	Yes	—N/a	Yes	—N/a
Nexz	"Nallina"	Nallina	Yes	—N/a	No	—N/a	No	—N/a
Tzuyu	"Run Away"	Aboutzu	Yes	—N/a	No	—N/a	No	—N/a
Park Jin-young	"Easy Lover"	Non-album single	Yes	—N/a	Yes	Nathan Cunningham, Marc Sibley, JBACH	Yes	—N/a
MiSaMo	"Identity"	Haute Couture	Yes	—N/a	No	—N/a	No	—N/a
Yao Chen	"Better With You"	Better With You	Yes	—N/a	Yes	—N/a	Yes	—N/a

=== 2025 ===
Artist	Song	Album	Lyrics		Music		Arrangement	
Artist	Song	Album	Credited	With	Credited	With	Credited	With
Kim Wan Sun & Seulgi	"Lucky"	Non-album single	Yes	—N/a	Yes	Lee Hae-sol, JBACH, DEZA	Yes	—N/a
Yeji	"Air"	Air	Yes	Yeji, Bang Hye-hyun (JamFactory), 3! (Lalala Studio)	No	—N/a	No	—N/a
Park Jin-young	"Gatsby"	World of Street Woman Fighter OST Vol.4 (Final)	Yes	—N/a	Yes	—N/a	Yes	—N/a
Youngbin	"Freak Show"	Non-album single	No	—N/a	Yes	—N/a	Yes	—N/a
Park Jin-young	"Happy Hour" with Kwon Jin-ah	Non-album single	Yes	—N/a	Yes	—N/a	Yes	—N/a

=== 2026 ===
Artist	Song	Album	Lyrics		Music		Arrangement	
Artist	Song	Album	Credited	With	Credited	With	Credited	With
Girlset	"Tweak"	Non-album single	Yes	—N/a	Yes	—N/a	Yes	—N/a
Park Jin-young	"Wet"	Non-album single	Yes	—N/a	Yes	Michael Fatkin, Castle, Bailey Flores, Ninos Hanna, CX Lucas, Maya Rose, Adam Ben Yahia, Lee Hae Sol	Yes	—N/a
