= Hush (Miss A song) =

2013 single by Miss A

Single by Miss A

from the album Hush
- Released: November 6, 2013
- Recorded: 2013
- Genre: K-pop
- Length: 3:07
- Label: JYP
- Songwriters: E-Tribe; Min Yeon Jae/1luv
- Producer: E-Tribe

Miss A singles chronology
"I Don't Need a Man" (2012)	"Hush" (2013)	"Only You" (2015)

Music video
- "Hush" on YouTube

Professional ratings
Review scores
Source	Rating
IZM	2.5/5 stars

"Hush" is a song recorded by K-pop girl group Miss A for their second studio album Hush. The song served as the group's seventh single in November 2013.

== Background and release ==
On October 30, 2013, members of Miss A posted a teaser of their new album on their social media, a photo of the members on a dark set. The group then posted teaser cuts of each member. On November 6, 2013, both the music video for "Hush" and their second studio album Hush were released.

== Composition ==
"Hush" lyrics were written by E-Tribe and Min Yeon Jae/1luv and composed by E-Tribe. The song is composed in the key A-flat minor and has 126 beats per minute and a running time of 3 minutes and 7 seconds.

== Promotion ==
On November 7 2013, Miss A held their first comeback stage for the song on Mnet's M Countdown. They also performed on other music programs such as KBS's Music Bank on November 8, MBC's Show! Music Core on November 9, and SBS's Inkigayo on November 10.

== Accolades ==
Music program awards
Program	Date (3 total)	Ref.
Inkigayo	November 17, 2013	
M Countdown	November 21, 2013	
Music Bank	November 22, 2013	

"Hush" on critic lists
Publisher/critic	List	Rank	Ref.
Billboard	20 Best K-pop Songs of 2013	16	

== Awards and nominations ==
Awards and nominations for "Hush"
Award ceremony	Year	Category	Result	Ref.
Gaon Chart Music Awards	2014	Song of the Month (November)	Won	
Golden Disc Awards	2014	Digital Bonsang Award	Nominated	
Mnet Asian Music Awards	2014	Best Dance Performance Female Group	Nominated	
Mnet Asian Music Awards	2014	Song of the Year	Nominated	

== Charts ==
=== Weekly charts ===
Weekly chart positions
Chart (2013)	Peak position
South Korea (Gaon)	5
South Korea (K-pop Hot 100)	4
US World Digital Songs (Billboard)	4

=== Monthly charts ===
Chart (November 2013)	Peak position
South Korea (Gaon)	4

== Sales ==
Country	Sales
South Korea (digital)	972,717

== Release history ==
Release history for "Hush"
Region	Date	Format	Label
Various	November 6, 2013	Digital download	JYP
