= Min (South Korean singer) =

South Korean singer (born 1991)

- 이민영
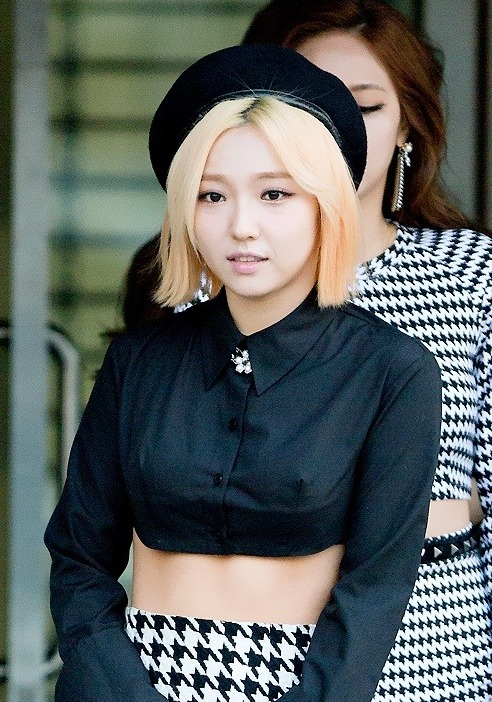
- Min in June 2014
- Born: Lee Min-young; June 21, 1991 (age 35); Seoul, South Korea
- Other name: Min
- Occupations: Singer; television personality; actress; songwriter
- Spouse: Unknown (m. 2025)
- Musical career
- Genre: K-pop
- Instrument: Vocals
- Years active: 2007–present
- Labels: JYP; K-Tigers E&C; Monstar Entertainment
- Formerly of: Miss A; JYP Nation

Korean name
- Hangul: 이민영
- RR: I Minyeong
- MR: I Minyŏng

Lee Min-young (Korean: 이민영; born June 21, 1991), known professionally as Min, is a South Korean singer, television personality, songwriter, and actress. She is best known as a former member of the South Korean girl group Miss A.

== Early life ==
Min was born in Seoul, South Korea on June 21, 1991. At a young age she participated in BoBoBo (the Korean equivalent of Sesame Street), as part of the duo called Eolleong Ddungddang. At 13 years old, she and Girls' Generation member Hyoyeon formed a dance duo called Little Winners. Min auditioned for JYP Entertainment when she was in the 6th grade. After a year of training, she was sent to the U.S. to prepare for a U.S. debut, and studied at the Repertory Company High School for Theatre Arts in Manhattan, New York City.

== Career ==
For Min's U.S. debut, Park Jin-young teamed up with Lil Jon in the production of her album. She released three solo singles in 2007 and 2008: Dance Like This, Go Ahead and Boyfriend.

=== Miss A ===
Min marked her official debut in South Korea as part of the four-member girl group Miss A on July 1, 2010 with the release of the single Bad Girl Good Girl from their debut EP Bad But Good. It remains their most renowned and successful song to date. In November 2017, it was reported that Min had departed from the group as her contract with JYP Entertainment had come to an end.

=== Solo activities ===
After Miss A's formal promotions ended for "Bad Girl Good Girl", Min collaborated with label mate San E for his debut single "Tasty San". She joined him on his debut stages on various music shows for the month of September. Min was then selected to be a part of the G20 Seoul Summit that was held in November 2010. She was chosen to sing with 20 various idols from 2PM, 2AM, Girls' Generation, BEAST, MBLAQ and more for its theme song. The recording was done separately for two days and one day for all the participants to gather for the recording of the chorus. The song, entitled Let's Go, was released through a number of online music charts on October 15, 2010.

In October 2010, Min was cast as a fixed member of Oh! My School, a South Korean variety show broadcast by KBS until its end in May 2011. It was during this time that Min was able to showcase her renowned "kkab" dancing and variety skills. On an episode of Oh! My School, Min had confided in her fellow cast members that at one point, she had given up life as a trainee. Disheartened from the recurring delays and uncertainties of her U.S. debut, she had returned to South Korea. Min had cut off contact with her family for one and a half years, during which time she supported herself by teaching dance and English lessons.

Min made her acting debut in the 2011 South Korean caper film Countdown alongside screen veterans Jung Jae-young and Jeon Do-yeon. She played the role of Hyeon-ji, the estranged and rebellious young daughter of the charismatic fraudster Cha Ha-yeon.

In August 2016, Min collaborated with childhood friends Hyoyeon of Girls' Generation and Jo Kwon of 2AM to form the co-ed project group Triple T. The trio released their debut single titled "Born to be Wild", featuring Park Jin-young, as part of SM Entertainment's ongoing weekly Station music project.

It was revealed in September 2016 that Min would be making her return to the big screen with the movie Sooni: The Executioner's Daughter. Although originally planned for a Summer 2017 release in South Korea, the current status of the movie production is unknown.

In January 2017, the cast of the Korean adaptation of Boys Over Flowers The Musical was revealed, with representatives of the production announcing that Min would be making her musical debut with the star role of Tsukushi Makino. The musical opened on February 24 and had its final curtain call on May 7 at Hongik University Art Center's Grand Theater in Seoul.

On May 22, 2019, it was revealed that Min has signed an exclusive contract with her new agency K-Tigers E&C. On November 8, 2021, Min released her first official solo pre-debut digital single "Onion". On April 18, 2022, Min released her second digital single "Hit Me Up". On September 5, 2022, Min released her third digital single "To The Beach".

On August 22, 2022, Min was confirmed to be making her Broadway debut in Manhattan with the K-pop inspired musical KPOP. The musical featured several K-pop stars in its cast, with Min portraying the role of Riya, a member of the fictional K-pop girl group RTMIS. The musical made its Broadway debut in the fall of 2022 at Circle in the Square Theatre, and abruptly closed two weeks into its run.

On June 21, 2024, Min released her debut EP Prime Time, which features four songs, including one of the same name. The lead single features rapper Lil Cherry. On June 5, 2025, to mark the occasion of her upcoming wedding on June 7, 2025, Min released her special celebratory single "Dive Into You".

== Personal life ==
On April 21, 2025, BeMonstar Entertainment and K-Tigers Entertainment announced that Min would marry her non-celebrity boyfriend, a businessman, in June after dating for seven years. Min married on June 7 in Seoul.

== Discography ==
=== Extended plays ===
Title	Details	Peak chart positions	
Title	Details	KOR	US World
Prime Time	Released: June 21, 2024; Label: Monstar Entertainment; Formats: Digital Download, streaming; Track listing: 1. "Prime Time" (feat. Lil Cherry); 2. "Shimmy (Skip)"; 3. "M.A.W"; 4. "Happy Plant (A Call From Grandma)"	—	—
"—" denotes releases that did not chart or were not released in that region.

=== Singles ===
Title	Year	Peak chart positions		Sales (Digital download)	Album
Title	Year	KOR Gaon	US World (Note: Chart rankings for the Billboard World Digital Songs Chart beyond the top three positions are only viewable with a subscription.)	Sales (Digital download)	Album
As lead artist
"Dance Like This"	2007	—	—	—N/a	Non-album singles
"Go Ahead"	2008	—	—	—N/a	Non-album singles
"Boyfriend"	2008	—	—	—N/a	Non-album singles
"Onion" (feat. Chang Suk-hoon)	2021	—	—	—N/a	Non-album singles
"Hit Me Up" (feat. JMIN)	2022	—	—	—N/a	Non-album singles
"To The Beach" (바다로 가자)	2022	—	—	—N/a	Non-album singles
"Prime Time" (feat. Lil Cherry)	2024	—	—	—N/a	Prime Time
"Dive Into You"	2025	—	—	—N/a	Non-album singles
"Winter's Night"	2025	—	—	—N/a	Non-album singles
As featured artist
"Tasty San" (San E, feat. Min)	2010	45	—	—N/a	Everybody Ready?
"Just The Two Of Us" (Baro, feat. Min)	2012	102	—	KOR: 58,307+	Ignition
"Marathon" (Deepshower, feat. Min)	2018	—	—	—N/a	Colors
"IDK" (Tyroné Laurent, feat. Min)	2022	—	—	—N/a	IDK
Collaborations
"Let's Go" (as part of Group of 20)	2010	116	—	—N/a	G20 Seoul Summit (Non-album release)
"This Christmas" (as part of JYP Nation)	2010	34	—	—N/a	JYP Nation Team Play Concert (Non-album release)
"Born To Be Wild" (as part of Triple T, feat. Park Jin-young)	2016	164	11	KOR: 13,112+	SM Station Season 1
"Encore" (as part of JYP Nation)	2016	—	—	KOR: 2,945+	JYP Nation Mix & Match Concert (Non-album release)
"Rull It Out" (MRSHLL, feat. Min & Ugly Duck)	2018	—	—	—N/a	Alien Issa Mixtape
"Jiryuh" (AFSHeeN, feat. Min)	2020	—	—	—N/a	Jiryuh
"Who We R *" (Lil Cherry and Goldbuuda, feat. Min & Lil Kirby)	2022	—	—	—N/a	Space Talk
"Sweetie Creamy" (Junhong and Yoon Si Yan, feat. Min)	2025	—	—	—N/a	Sweetie Creamy
Soundtrack appearances
"Living Like A Fool" (바보같이 살았죠)	2012	71	—	KOR: 181,793+	Bachelor's Vegetable Store OST
"Let It Bleed" (with About)	2021	—	—	—N/a	Bite Sisters OST
"Mint Candy" (민트맛사탕)	2022	—	—	—N/a	Taste of Love OST
"Perfect" (완벽한 걸) (with various)	2023	—	—	—N/a	KPOP (Original Broadway Cast Recording)
"Shi Gan Nang Bee (Waste of Time)" (시간낭비) (with various)	2023	—	—	—N/a	KPOP (Original Broadway Cast Recording)
"Supergoddess" (슈퍼가디스) (with various)	2023	—	—	—N/a	KPOP (Original Broadway Cast Recording)
"Gin & Tonic" (진 앤 토닉) (with various)	2023	—	—	—N/a	KPOP (Original Broadway Cast Recording)
"—" denotes releases that did not chart or were not released in that region.

=== Songwriting credits ===
Year	Song	Artist	Album	Music publisher	KOMCA		Notes
Year	Song	Artist	Album	Music publisher	Credited	With	Notes
2015	"The Mirene Song"	Mirene	Non-album single	Stone Music	Yes	Irene Kim	Co-lyricist
2015	"Stuck"	Miss A	Colors	JYP	Yes	—N/a	Lyricist
2016	"Far, Far Away"	G.Soul	Far, Far Away	JYP	Yes	G.Soul	Co-lyricist
2018	"Marathon"	Deepshower	COLORS	Stone Music	Yes	Deepshower, MRSHLL	Co-composer, Co-lyricist
2020	"Jiryuh"	AFSHeeN	Jiryuh	CONECTD	No	—N/a	Lyricist
2021	"Onion"	Min	Onion	Danal Entertainment	No	MRSHLL	Co-composer, Co-lyricist
2022	"Hit Me Up"	Min	Hit Me Up	Warner Music Korea	Yes	JMIN, Leanon, Xitsuh	Co-composer
2022	"Who We R *"	Lil Cherry and Goldbuuda	Space Talk	Sony Music Korea	Yes	Goldbuuda, Lil Cherry, Lil Kirby	Co-lyricist
2022	"To The Beach"	Min	To The Beach	Warner Music Korea	Yes	Neckwav	Co-composer, Co-lyricist
2024	"Prime Time"	Min	Prime Time	Monstar Entertainment	No	Abraham Lim, Heeyeon Ko, Lil Cherry, MJ Boaz, Perri Cordray	Co-lyricist
2024	"Shimmy (Skip)"	Min	Prime Time	Monstar Entertainment	No	Heeyeon Ko, MJ Boaz, Perri Cordray	Co-lyricist
2025	"Dive Into You"	Min	Dive Into You	Monstar Entertainment	No	MRSHLL	Co-lyricist

== Filmography ==
=== Drama ===
Year	Title	Role	Notes/Ref.
2011	Dream High	Flash Mob Dancer	Cameo (Episode 16)
2012	Dream High 2	Herself	Cameo (Episode 15)
2013	Reckless Family Season 2	Herself	Sitcom
2015	Dream Knight	Jenny Lee	Web Drama
2015	L.U.V Collage	Kim Na-ra	Web Drama

=== Film ===
Year	Title	Role	Director	Notes
2011	Countdown	Jang Hyeon-ji	Heo Jong-ho	Support Role
TBD	Sooni: The Executioner's Daughter	Soo-ja	Ji Seong-won	Support Role

=== Variety shows ===
Year	Show	Notes
2010	Oh! My School	Fixed cast member
2014	K-Style Season 3	Host with Irene Kim
2015	K-Style Season 4	Host with Irene Kim
2018	Get It Beauty on the Road Malaysia	Host with Kaka Azraff & Kim Jung-min

== Musical theatre ==
Year	Title	Role	Notes
2017	Boys Over Flowers The Musical	Makino Tsukushi	Lead Role
2020-21	Super Lunatic The Musical	Iron Wall Girl	Support Role
2022-23	KPOP The Musical	Riya	RTMIS Member

== See also ==
- Koreans in New York City
