= Touch (Miss A song) =

2012 single by Miss A

Single by Miss A

from the EP Touch
- Released: February 20, 2012
- Recorded: 2012
- Genre: K-pop
- Length: 3:58
- Label: JYP
- Songwriter: Park Jin-Young
- Producer: Park Jin-Young

Miss A singles chronology
"Good-bye Baby" (2011)	"Touch" (2012)	"I Don't Need a Man" (2012)

Music video
- "Touch" on YouTube

Professional ratings
Review scores
Source	Rating
IZM	3/5 stars

"Touch" is a song recorded by K-pop girl group Miss A for their first EP Touch. The song served as the group's fifth single in February 2012.

== Release ==
On February 20, 2012, both the music video for "Touch" and their first EP Touch were released.

== Composition ==
"Touch", was written, composed and arranged by Park Jin-Young with Hong Ji Sang also doing doing the arrangement. The song is composed in the key C major and has 117 beats per minute and a running time of 3 minutes and 57 seconds. "Touch" is described as a song that sings "Love Blooms in Pain." The lyrics express of being hurt by love but starting a new love in that pain are repeated with an addictive melody.

== Promotion ==
Miss A held their first comeback stage on February 23, 2012, on M Countdown, they also performed on M Countdown on March 1, March 8 and March 23. They also performed on KBS's Music Bank on March 2 and SBS's Inkigayo on March 3.

== Accolades ==
Music program awards
Program	Date	Ref.
M Countdown	March 1, 2012	
Show Champion	February 28, 2012	
Show Champion	March 6, 2012	
Music On Top	March 7, 2012	
Inkigayo	March 4, 2012	

== Awards and nominations ==
Awards and nominations for "Touch"
Award ceremony	Year	Category	Result	Ref.
Golden Disc Awards	2012	Digital Bonsang	Won	
Golden Disc Awards	2012	Popularity Award	Nominated	
Golden Disc Awards	2012	MSN International Award	Nominated	
Golden Disc Awards	2012	MSN Southeast Asian Award	Nominated	
Seoul Music Awards	2013	Bonsang Award	Won	

== Charts ==
=== Weekly charts ===
Weekly chart positions
Chart (2012)	Peak position
South Korea (Gaon)	2
South Korea (K-pop Hot 100)	2
US World Digital Songs (Billboard)	6

=== Monthly charts ===
Chart (February 2012)	Peak position
South Korea (Gaon)	7

=== Year-end charts ===
Chart (2012)	Peak position
South Korea (Gaon)	35

== Sales ==
Country	Sales
South Korea (digital)	2,675,320

== Release history ==
Release history for "Touch"
Region	Date	Format	Label
Various	February 20, 2012	Digital download	JYP
