= Breathe (Miss A song) =

2010 single by Miss A

Single by Miss A

from the album A Class and Step Up
- Released: September 27, 2010
- Recorded: 2010
- Genre: K-pop
- Length: 3:33
- Label: JYP
- Songwriter: Park Jin-young
- Producers: Park Jin-young; Hong ji-sang; Sim Eun-ji

Miss A singles chronology
| "Bad Girl Good Girl" (2010) | "Breathe" (2010) | "Love Alone" (2011) |

Music video
- "Breathe" on YouTube

Professional ratings
Review scores
| Source | Rating |
|---|---|
| IZM | 2/5 stars |

"Breathe" is a song recorded by K-pop girl group Miss A for their second single album Step Up. The song served as the group's second single in September 2010.

== Release ==
On September 27, 2010, both the music video for "Breathe" and their second single album Step Up were released. The Music video was directed by Jang Jae-hyeok.

== Composition ==
"Breathe" lyrics were written by Park Jin-young and composed by Park Jin-young, Hong ji-sang and Shim Eun-ji. The song is composed in the key C major and has 112 beats per minute and a running time of 3 minutes and 33 seconds.

== Promotion ==
On October 7, 2010, Miss A held their first comeback stage for the song on Mnet's M Countdown. They also performed on Music Bank on October 8.

== Charts ==
=== Weekly charts ===
Weekly chart positions
| Chart (2010) | Peak position |
|---|---|
| South Korea (Gaon) | 2 |

=== Monthly charts ===
| Chart (October 2010) | Peak position |
|---|---|
| South Korea (Gaon) | 4 |

=== Year-end charts ===
| Chart (2010) | Peak position |
|---|---|
| South Korea (Gaon) | 27 |

== Accolades ==
Music program awards
| Program | Date (1 total) | Ref. |
|---|---|---|
| M Countdown | October 21, 2010 | |

== Sales ==
| Country | Sales |
|---|---|
| South Korea (digital) | 2,080,423 |

== Release history ==
Release history for "Breathe"
| Region | Date | Format | Label |
|---|---|---|---|
| Various | September 27, 2010 | Digital download | JYP |
