= List of Gaon Digital Chart number ones of 2010 =

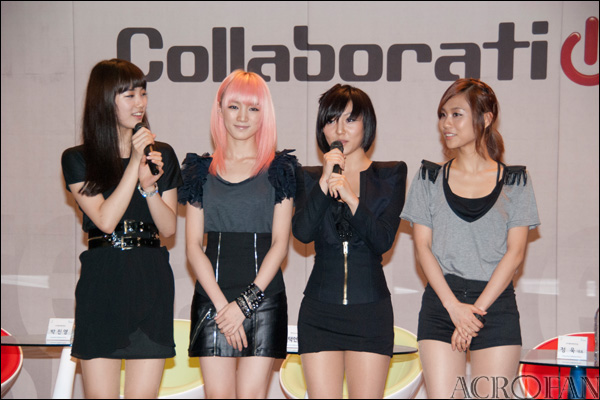
Girl group Miss A topped the chart with "Bad Girl Good Girl" for four consecutive weeks; the song became the best-performing single of 2010.

The Gaon Digital Chart is a chart that ranks the best-performing singles in South Korea. Managed by the domestic Ministry of Culture, Sports and Tourism (MCST). Its data is compiled by the Korea Music Content Industry Association and published by the Gaon Music Chart. The ranking is based collectively on each single's weekly download sales, stream count, and background music usage. In mid-2008, the Recording Industry Association of Korea ceased publishing music sales data. The MCST established a process to collect music sales in 2009, and began publicly publishing its data with the introduction of the Gaon Music Chart the following February. With the creation of the Gaon Digital Chart, digital data for individual songs was provided in the country for the first time.

In 2010, 35 singles claimed the top spot in 52 weeks of rankings. Gain and Jo Kwon's collaboration "I Happen to Love You" became the first song to top the Digital Chart, doing so for three consecutive weeks. "Bad Girl Good Girl" by Miss A, the quartet's debut single, spent four consecutive weeks at number one on the Gaon Digital Chart. It went on to become the best-performing single of 2010, topping the year-end chart. Girls' Generation topped the chart with three different songs, more than any other act. On the monthly chart, Girls' Generation and IU had the most number-one singles, with two each. 2AM logged the most entries on the year-end chart, with five songs ranking in the top 100. "Can't Let You Go Even If I Die" was the most downloaded song with 3,352,827 sales.

== Weekly chart ==
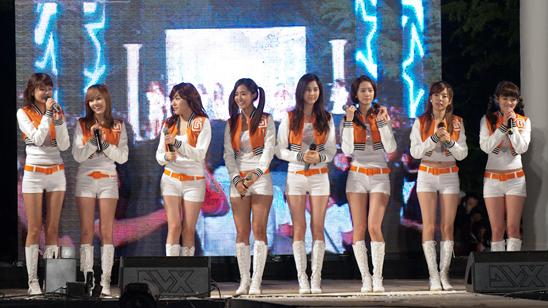
Girls' Generation accumulated three number-one singles in 2010, the most of any act. The group also topped the monthly chart with two entries.

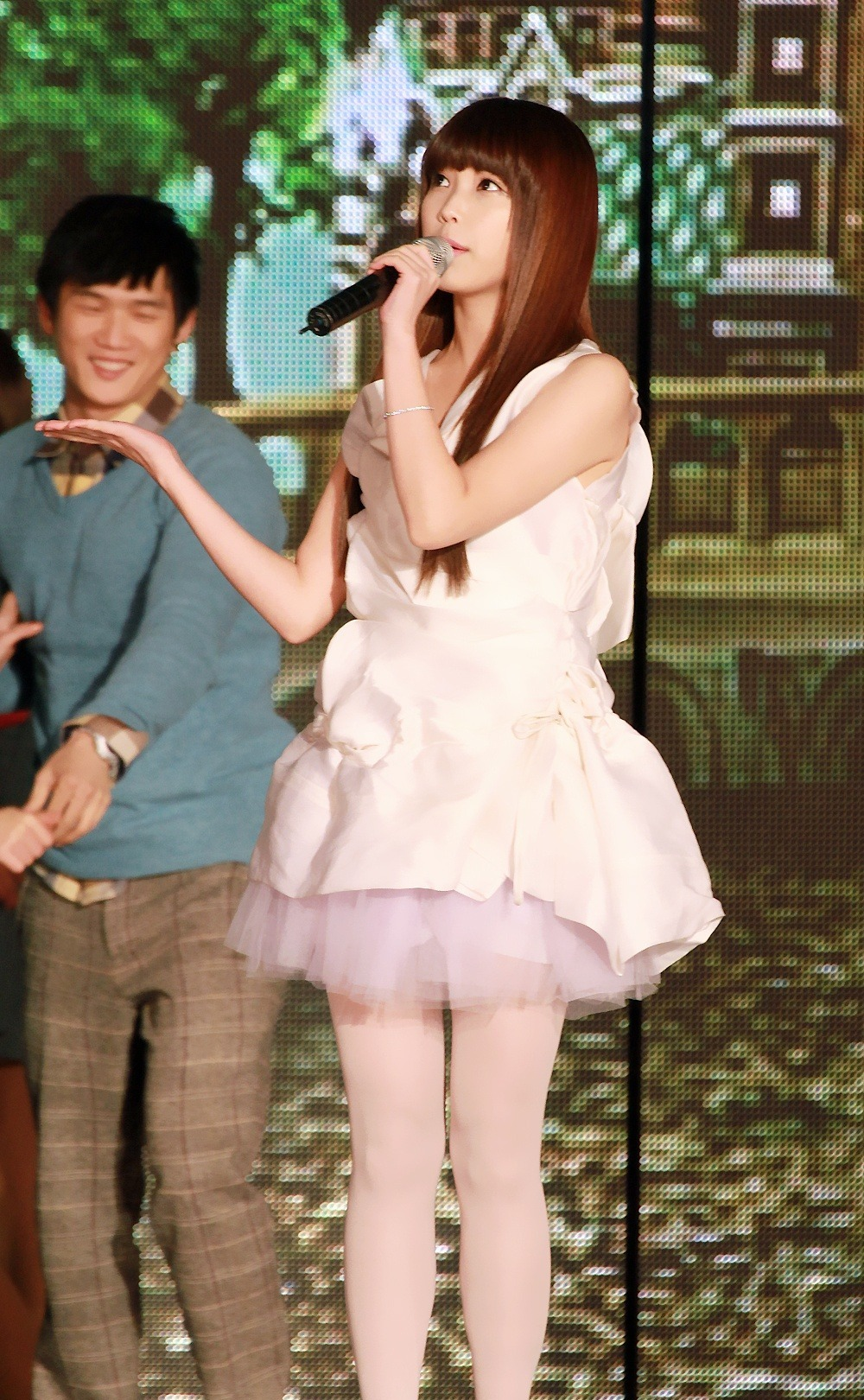
IU, along with Girls' Generation, had the most songs top the monthly chart, with two each.

Key
†	Indicates best-performing single of 2010

Week ending	Song	Artist(s)	Ref.
January 2	"I Happen to Love You" (Korean: 우리 사랑하게 됐어요)	Gain and Jo Kwon	
January 9	"I Happen to Love You" (Korean: 우리 사랑하게 됐어요)	Gain and Jo Kwon	
January 16	"I Happen to Love You" (Korean: 우리 사랑하게 됐어요)	Gain and Jo Kwon	
January 23	"Can't Let You Go Even If I Die" (죽어도 못 보내)	2AM	
January 30	"Can't Let You Go Even If I Die" (죽어도 못 보내)	2AM	
February 6	"Oh!"	Girls' Generation	
February 13	"Try to Follow Me" (날 따라 해봐요)	2NE1	
February 20	"Lupin" (루팡)	Kara	
February 27	"Lupin" (루팡)	Kara	
March 6	"You Drive Me Crazy" (너 때문에 미쳐)	T-ara	
March 13	"You Drive Me Crazy" (너 때문에 미쳐)	T-ara	
March 20	"Run Devil Run"	Girls' Generation	
March 27	"Run Devil Run"	Girls' Generation	
April 3	"Love Song" (널 붙잡을 노래)	Rain	
April 10	"Swing" (그네)	Lee Hyori featuring Gary	
April 17	"Chitty Chitty Bang Bang"	Lee Hyori featuring Ceejay	
April 24	"Without U"	2PM	
May 1	"Spiteful Words" (이 거지같은 말)	Seo Young-eun featuring Jungyup	
May 8	"Nu ABO" (NU 예삐오)	f(x)	
May 15	"Time Please Stop" (시간아 멈춰라)	Davichi	
May 22	"2 Different Tears"	Wonder Girls	
May 29	"2 Different Tears"	Wonder Girls	
June 5	"2 Different Tears"	Wonder Girls	
June 12	"Nagging" (잔소리)	IU with Seulong	
June 19	"Nagging" (잔소리)	IU with Seulong	
June 26	"Nagging" (잔소리)	IU with Seulong	
July 3	"Sick Enough to Die" (죽을 만큼 아파서)	MC Mong featuring Mellow	
July 10	"Bad Girl Good Girl"†	miss A	
July 17	"Bad Girl Good Girl"†	miss A	
July 24	"Bad Girl Good Girl"†	miss A	
July 31	"Bad Girl Good Girl"†	miss A	
August 7	"I'm a Guy Like This" (나 이런사람이야)	DJ DOC	
August 14	"I Was Able to Eat Well" (밥만 잘 먹더라)	Homme	
August 21	"Madonna"	Secret	
August 28	"I Was Able to Eat Well" (밥만 잘 먹더라)	Homme	
September 4	"Love Love Love" (사랑 사랑 사랑)	F.T. Island	
September 11	"Why" (왜)	Supreme Team featuring Youngjun	
September 18	"Go Away"	2NE1	
September 25	"Go Away"	2NE1	
October 2	"It's You" (그대네요)	Sung Si-kyung with IU	
October 9	"Then Then Then" (그땐 그땐 그땐)	Supreme Team featuring Youngjun	
October 16	"Irreversible" (돌이킬 수 없는)	Gain	
October 23	"By Instinct" (본능적으로)	Kang Seung-yoon featuring Swings	
October 30	"Hoot" (훗)	Girls' Generation	
November 6	"You Wouldn't Answer My Calls" (전활 받지 않는 너에게)	2AM	
November 13	"Always" (언제나)	Huh Gak	
November 20	"Always" (언제나)	Huh Gak	
November 27	"Like a Star" (별처럼)	Taeyeon and The One	
December 4	"If It's Same" (똑같다면)	Brown Eyed Soul	
December 11	"Good Day" (좋은 날)	IU	
December 18	"Good Day" (좋은 날)	IU	
December 25	"Good Day" (좋은 날)	IU	

== Monthly charts ==
Month	Song	Artist	Ref.
January	"Can't Let You Go Even If I Die" (죽어도 못 보내)	2AM	
February	"Oh!"	Girls' Generation	
March	"Run Devil Run"	Girls' Generation	
April	"Chitty Chitty Bang Bang"	Lee Hyori featuring Ceejay	
May	"Time Please Stop" (시간아 멈춰라)	Davichi	
June	"Nagging" (잔소리)	IU with Seulong	
July	"Bad Girl Good Girl"	miss A	
August	"I Was Able to Eat Well" (밥만 잘 먹더라)	Homme	
September	"Go Away"	2NE1	
October	"Then Then Then" (그땐 그땐 그땐)	Supreme Team featuring Youngjun	
November	"Always" (언제나)	Huh Gak	
December	"Good Day" (좋은 날)	IU	
