= Colors (EP) =

EP by Miss A
- Released: 30 March 2015
- Recorded: 2015
- Genres: R&B; dance-pop; k-pop
- Length: 21:09
- Languages: Korean; English
- Label: JYP Entertainment

Miss A chronology
Hush (2013)	Colors (2015)

Singles from Colors
- 1. "Only You" Released: 30 March 2015

Colors is the third extended play by South Korean girl group Miss A, which was released on 30 March 2015 by JYP Entertainment. "Only You" serves as the lead single for the album. This is the group's final release before their disbandment on December 27, 2017.

== Background and release ==
In an interview with Star News in November 2014, JYP Entertainment founder Park Jin-young revealed that the group would start working on their next album once member Suzy was finished shooting her upcoming film The Sound of a Flower in December. The album was slated for a summer 2015 release, and it was later announced that they would return sometime in the first half of the year. On 18 March 2015, it was revealed that the album would be released on 30 March, with their first live performance to be held on the same day at K-Art Hall in Olympic Park, Seoul.

As to why it took more than a year for the group's return, member Min explained that the process of finding good songs for their album was longer than they thought with member Jia adding that Park Jin-young gave them one of his songs but it was not included as it didn't have the "right feel".

A special edition of the album was released on 22 May 2015 in Hong Kong and Taiwan and includes Chinese versions of the songs "Only You", "I Caught Ya", and "Stuck", with the lyrics translate by member Fei.

== Composition ==
Colors consists of six songs of various genres. The lead track "Only You" was written and composed by Black Eyed Pilseung, who had produced Sistar's "Touch My Body" and is a dance-pop song that includes hip-hop and trap rhythms. "One Step" is a retro neo soul song that incorporates groove, electronic and acoustic piano sounds. The track "Love Song" blends in violin sounds with a trap beat while "Melting" was composed by Norwegian producer group Dsign Music and is described as a "simple but strong song" with a "polished melody".The lyrics of "I Caught Ya" was written by member Suzy and talks about a girl witnessing her boyfriend cheating. "Stuck" is a medium tempo ballad characterized with "strong beats". The lyrics were written by member Min and is based on her own experiences, describing a love story about whether or not to date someone else.

== Commercial performance ==
Colors debuted at number three on the Gaon Album Chart while "Only You" debuted at number one on the Gaon Digital Chart for the week ending 4 April 2015.

== Track listing ==
Colors EP
No.	Title	Lyrics	Music	Arrangement	Length
1.	"One Step" (한걸음; Hangeoreum)	Yorkie, Sung Hyun-bin	Im Gwan-guk (Devine Channel), Ryan Kim (Devine Channel), Mistazo (Artronic Waves), Dauri (Artronic Waves), Kara Tenae, Chase	Im Gwan-guk (Devine Channel), Ryan Kim (Devine Channel), Mistazo (Artronic Waves), Dauri (Artronic Waves), Kara Tenae, Chase	3:39
2.	"Only You" (다른 남자 말고 너; Dareun Namja Malgo Neo)	Black Eyed Pilseung, Sam Lewis	Black Eyed Pilseung	Black Eyed Pilseung	3:18
3.	"Love Song"	Daniel Kim	Daniel Kim, Mayu Wakisaka	Daniel Kim	3:50
4.	"Melting" (녹아; Noga)	Daniel Kim	Nermin Harambasic, Jin Suk Choi, Courtney Jenaé Stahl, David Siegel, Jesse Saint John	Jin Suk Choi	2:59
5.	"I Caught Ya"	Suzy	Hanif "Hitmanic" Sabzevari, Henrik Janson, Emelie Fjällström	Hanif "Hitmanic" Sabzevari	4:11
6.	"Stuck"	Min	Sophia Pae, Erik Lidbom	Erik Lidbom	3:12
Total length:					21:09

== Charts ==
Chart (2015)	Peak position
Korean Albums (Gaon)	3
US World Albums (Billboard)	4

== Release history ==
Region	Date	Format	Label
South Korea	30 March 2015	CD, digital download	JYP Entertainment
Worldwide	30 March 2015	Digital download	JYP Entertainment
Hong Kong	22 May 2015	CD + DVD	Universal Music Group
Taiwan	22 May 2015	CD + DVD	Universal Music Group
