= Only You (Miss A song) =

2015 single by Miss A

Single by Miss A

from the EP Colors
- Released: March 30, 2015
- Recorded: 2015
- Genre: K-pop
- Length: 3:18
- Label: JYP
- Songwriters: Black Eyed Pilseung; Sam Lewis
- Producer: Black Eyed Pilseung

Miss A singles chronology
"Hush" (2013)	"Only You" (2015)

Music video
- "Only You" on YouTube

"Only You" (Korean: 다른 남자 말고 너; RR: dareun namja malgo neo, lit. 'Not another guy, but you') is a song recorded by K-pop girl group Miss A for their third EP Colors and is their eighth and final single before their disbandment on December 27, 2017. "Only You" topped the Gaon Digital Chart for two weeks and became one of the best-performing singles of 2015.

== Background and release ==
On March 18, JYP Entertainment posted four concept photos of the bright smiles of each Miss A member in a group photo. JYP then posted the teaser image for each member sequentially starting from March 19. On March 30, 2015, both the music video for "Only You" and their third EP Colors were released.

== Composition ==
"Only You" lyrics were written by Black Eyed Pilseung and Sam Lewis and composed by Black Eyed Pilseung. The song is composed in the key C major and has 168 beats per minute and a running time of 3 minutes and 18 seconds. "Only You" is a song that exudes the charm of miss A, conveying women's confident love confessions with an addictive melody.

== Promotion ==
On April 2 2015, Miss A held their first comeback stage for the song on Mnet's M Countdown. They also performed on M Countdown on April 9. KBS's Music Bank on April 3 and April 10, MBC's Show! Music Core on April 11 and SBS's Inkigayo on April 5.

== Music video ==
The music video was directed by Naive Creative Production and was released alongside the song by JYP Entertainment on March 30. The music video shows the group preparing to go to a party while showing off their confident attitude as modern independent women. It gained more than 2 million views in the first 24 hours.

== Charts ==
=== Weekly charts ===
Weekly chart positions
Chart (2015)	Peak position
South Korea (Gaon)	1
US World Digital Songs (Billboard)	6

=== Monthly charts ===
Chart (April 2015)	Peak position
South Korea (Gaon)	1

=== Year-end charts ===
Chart (2015)	Peak position
South Korea (Gaon)	11

== Sales ==
Country	Sales
South Korea (digital)	1,284,135

== Publication lists ==
Publication lists for "Only You"
Critic/Publication	List	Rank	Ref.
Idolator	The 25 Best K-pop Songs of 2015	20	

== Release history ==
Release history for "Only You"
Region	Date	Format	Label
Various	March 30, 2015	Digital download	JYP
