= I Don't Need a Man (Miss A song) =

2012 single by Miss A

Single by Miss A

from the EP Independent Women Part III
- Released: October 15, 2012
- Recorded: 2012
- Genre: K-pop
- Length: 3:30
- Label: JYP
- Songwriter: Park Jin-young
- Producer: Park Jin-young

Miss A singles chronology
"Touch" (2012)	"I Don't Need a Man" (2012)	"Hush" (2013)

Music video
- "I Don’t Need A Man" on YouTube

"I Don't Need A Man" (Korean: 남자 없이 잘 살아; RR: namja eopsi jal sara) is a song recorded by K-pop girl group Miss A for their second EP Independent Women Part III. The song served as the group's sixth single in October 2012.

== Release ==
On October 15, 2012, both the music video for "I Don't Need a Man" and their second EP Independent Women Part III were released.

== Composition ==
"I Don't Need a Man" was written and composed by JYP Entertainment founder Park Jin-young. The song is composed in the key C major and has 156 beats per minute and a running time of 3 minutes and 30 seconds.

== Publication lists ==
Publication lists for "I Don't Need A Man"
Critic/Publication	List	Rank	Ref.
Popjustice	Top 15 K‑Pop Singles of 2012	6	
Spin	Top 20 K-pop Singles of 2012	3	

== Charts ==
=== Weekly charts ===
Weekly chart positions
Chart (2012)	Peak position
South Korea (Gaon)	3
South Korea (K-pop Hot 100)	4
US World Digital Songs (Billboard)	5

=== Monthly charts ===
Chart (October 2012)	Peak position
South Korea (Gaon)	6

=== Year-end charts ===
Chart (2012)	Peak position
South Korea (Gaon)	64

== Sales ==
Country	Sales
South Korea (digital)	1,714,745

== Release history ==
Release history for "I Don’t Need A Man"
Region	Date	Format	Label
Various	October 15, 2012	Digital download	JYP
