= Hush (Miss A album) =

2013 studio album by Miss A

Studio album by Miss A
- Released: November 6, 2013
- Genres: R&B; dance-pop; K-pop
- Length: 45:59
- Languages: Korean; English
- Labels: AQ/JYP; KT Music
- Producer: Park Jin-young

Miss A chronology
Independent Women Part III (2012)	Hush (2013)	Colors (2015)

Singles from Hush
- 1. "Hush" Released: November 6, 2013; 2. "Come On Over" Released: December 18, 2013; 3. "Hide & Sick" Released: January 21, 2014; 4. "Love Is U" Released: February 16, 2014

Hush is the second and final studio album by South Korean-Chinese girl group Miss A. The album and music video called "Hush" was released on November 6, 2013, and contains thirteen songs including seven entirely new songs.

"Hush" served as its lead single. "Come On Over" served to continue the promotion of the album in China and ended in Korea. "Hide & Sick" was released in January 2014. "Love Is U" was used to ended the promotion of the album.

== Track listing ==
Official track listing
No.	Title	Lyrics	Music	Length
1.	"Come on Over" (놀러와)	Tiger Gold	Tiger Gold	3:39
2.	"Hush" (허쉬)	E-Tribe, Min Yeon Jae/1luv	E-Tribe	3:06
3.	"Love Is U"	Heuk Tae, Park Woo Sang	Heuk Tae, Park Woo Sang	3:43
4.	"Spotlight"	Tommy Park, Joo Hyo / Song Seung Geun	Tommy Park, Joo Hyo / Song Seung Geun	3:12
5.	"Hide & Sick"	Lee Woo Min	Lee Woo Min	3:27
6.	"(Mama) I'm Good"	Team One Sound	Team One Sound	3:15
7.	"Like U"	Noday, Park Hye Soo	Noday	4:23
8.	"Hush" (허쉬) (Party version)	E-Tribe, Min Yeon Jae/1luv	E-Tribe	3:51
9.	"Touch" (터치)	Park Jin Young	Park Jin Young	3:57
10.	"Over U"	Kim Eun Soo, Ursula Yancy, Billion Dollar Baby	Yoon Sung Ho, Noday	3:08
11.	"Time's Up"	Rphabet	Rphabet	3:52
12.	"If I Were a Boy"	Kim Eun Soo	Jonathan Ian Green, Mads Hauge, Phil Thornalley	2:56
13.	"I Don't Need a Man" (남자 없이 잘 살아)	Park Jin Young	Park Jin Young	3:30
Total length:				45:59

Taiwan Version - CD/DVD
No.	Title	Lyrics	Music	Length
13.	"I Don't Need a Man" (沒有男人也能好好的)	Park Jin Young	Park Jin Young	3:30
14.	"Hush" (Chinese version)	Wang Yajun	E-Tribe	3:06
Total length:				49:05

== Charts ==
=== Album chart ===
Chart	Peak position
Gaon Weekly album chart	2
Gaon Monthly album chart	8

=== Song chart ===
Song	Peak position	
Song	KOR	US
Song	Gaon Chart	K-Pop Billboard
"Hush"	5	4
