= Good-bye Baby =

2011 single by Miss A

Single by Miss A

from the album A Class
- Released: July 18, 2011
- Recorded: 2011
- Genre: K-pop
- Length: 3:46
- Label: JYP
- Songwriter: Park Jin-young
- Producers: Park Jin-young; Hong ji-sang

Miss A singles chronology
"Love Alone" (2011)	"Good-bye Baby" (2011)	"Touch" (2012)

Music video
- "Good-bye Baby" on YouTube

"Good-bye Baby" is a song recorded by K-pop girl group Miss A for their debut studio album A Class. "Good-bye Baby" topped the Gaon Digital Chart for two weeks and became one of the best-performing singles of 2011.

== Background and release ==
On July 11, 2011 Miss A first teased their comeback nine months after their second single album Step Up, for July 18, 2011, in which the title song "Good-bye Baby" was symbolically written. On July 18, 2011, both the music video for "Good-bye Baby" and their first studio album A Class were released.

== Composition ==
"Good-bye Baby" lyrics were written by Park Jin-young and composed by Park Jin-young and Shim Eun-ji. The song is composed in the key G-sharp minor and has 138 beats per minute and a running time of 3 minutes and 46 seconds. "Good-bye Baby" captured the ears of music fans at once with a powerful hip-hop rhythm and acoustic shuffle soul in the story of a woman who relentlessly abandons a flirting man.

== Promotion ==
On July 21 2011, Miss A held their first comeback stage for the song on Mnet's M Countdown they also performed on M Countdown on July 28. Miss A performed on KBS's Music Bank on July 29 and SBS's Inkigayo on July 31.

== Accolades ==
Music program awards
Program	Date (3 total)	Ref.
M Countdown	July 28, 2011	
Music Bank	July 29, 2011	
Inkigayo	July 31, 2011	

== Awards and nominations ==
Awards and nominations for "Good-bye Baby"
Award ceremony	Year	Category	Result	Ref.
Golden Disc Awards	2012	Digital Daesang of the Year	Nominated	
Golden Disc Awards	2012	Digital Bonsang Award	Won	
Mnet Asian Music Awards	2011	Song of the Year	Nominated	
Mnet Asian Music Awards	2011	Best Dance Performance – Female Group	Won	
Seoul Music Awards	2012	Bonsang Award	Won	

== Charts ==
=== Weekly charts ===
Weekly chart positions
Chart (2011)	Peak position
South Korea (Gaon)	1
South Korea (K-pop Hot 100)	1
US World Digital Songs (Billboard)	3

=== Monthly charts ===
Chart (July 2011)	Peak position
South Korea (Gaon)	4

=== Year-end charts ===
Chart (2011)	Peak position
South Korea (Gaon)	11

== Sales ==
Country	Sales
South Korea (digital)	3,613,664

== Release history ==
Release history for "Good-bye Baby"
Region	Date	Format	Label
Various	July 18, 2011	Digital download	JYP
