= Touch (EP) =

EP by Miss A
- Released: February 20, 2012
- Recorded: JYP Studio, Seoul, South Korea; 2012
- Genres: Dance-pop; electronic
- Length: 20:59
- Labels: JYP Entertainment; KMP Holdings; Universal Music
- Producer: Park Jin Young

Miss A chronology
A Class (2011)	Touch (2012)	Independent Women Part III (2012)

Singles from Touch
- 1. "Touch" Released: February 20, 2012

Touch is the first extended play by South Korean-Chinese girl group Miss A. It was released on February 20, 2012. The album contains six new tracks. The song Touch served as its lead single.

Only track no.1: Touch and track no.5: Over U were later added on Miss A's second album Hush

== Background ==
Miss A announced their comeback in Korea with a new mini-album called "Touch", that is confirmed to be released on February 20, 2012. On February 19, 2012, the music video was uploaded to YouTube through Miss A's official channel and gained over one million views in two days.

== Release and promotion ==
The full mini-album was released on February 20, 2012. Promotions for "Touch" began on February 23, 2012, on M! Countdown. They ended their promotions by performing the second single "Over U" during their last week leading towards April 1, 2012.

== Track listing ==
Official Track list
No.	Title	Lyrics	Music	Arrangement	Length
1.	"Touch" (터치)	Park Jin Young	Park Jin Young	Park Jin Young, Hong Ji Sang	3:58
2.	"Lips"	Billion Dollar Baby	Redd Stylez, Nikki Flores, Alexander Palmer, Billion Dollar Baby	Fuego	3:35
3.	"Rock n Rule"	Noday	Noday, Park Jiho	Noday, Park Jiho	3:20
4.	"No Mercy"	Hong Ji Sang	Hong Ji Sang	Hong Ji Sang	3:29
5.	"Over U"	Kim Eun Soo, Ursula Yancy, Billion Dollar Baby	Yoon Sung Ho, Noday	Noday, Billion Dollar Baby, Thomas J. Heyerdahl, Jan Janski Lindvaag for Deepfrost	3:09
6.	"Touch" (Newport Mix)	Park Jin Young	Park Jin Young	Lee Woo Min	3:23
Total length:					20:49

Asia Version
No.	Title	Lyrics	Music	Arrangement	Length
7.	"Touch" (中文版) (Chinese version)	Park Jin Young	Park Jin Young	Park Jin Young, Hong Ji Sang

Asia Version - DVD
No.	Title	Lyrics	Music	Arrangement	Length
1.	"Touch" (Korean version) (Music video)	Park Jin Young	Park Jin Young	Park Jin Young, Hong Ji Sang
2.	"Touch" (Chinese version) (Music video)	Park Jin Young	Park Jin Young	Park Jin Young, Hong Ji Sang

== Charts ==
Chart	Peak position
Gaon Weekly album chart	2
Gaon Monthly album chart	5
Gaon Yearly album chart	35

=== Sales ===
Chart	Sales
Gaon physical sales	21,613
