= Bad Girl Good Girl =

2010 single by Miss A

Single by Miss A

from the album Bad But Good and A Class
- Released: June 30, 2010
- Recorded: 2010
- Genre: K-pop
- Length: 3:38
- Label: JYP
- Songwriter: Park Jin-young
- Producer: Park Jin-young

Miss A singles chronology
"Bad Girl Good Girl" (2010)	"Breathe" (2010)

Music video
- "Bad Girl Good Girl" on YouTube

"Bad Girl Good Girl" is a song recorded by K-pop girl group Miss A for their debut EP Bad But Good. The song served as the group's debut single in June 2010. An instant commercial success in South Korea, "Bad Girl Good Girl" topped the Gaon Digital Chart and became the best-performing single of 2010. It also won several awards, including Song of the Year at the Mnet Asian Music Awards.

== Release ==
On June 30, 2010, both "Bad Girl Good Girl" and their first EP Bad But Good were released.

== Music video ==
On June 30, 2010, the music video for the song was released online. The music video features the girls in a school, dancing in sync.

== Awards and live performances ==
The group had their debut performance on July 1, 2010, with "Bad Girl Good Girl" on Mnet's M Countdown. They were number one for the first time on M Countdown on July 22. Miss A became number one again on KBS's Music Bank the following day on July 23 and on SBS's Inkigayo on August 1. "Bad Girl Good Girl" was awarded Song of The Month on Cyworld, one of the biggest Korean music portals.

== Accolades ==
Awards and nominations
Year	Organization	Award	Result	Ref.
2010	Cyworld Digital Music Awards	Rookie of the Month (July)	Won	
2010	Cyworld Digital Music Awards	Song of the Month (July)	Won	
2010	Golden Disc Awards	Digital Song Bonsang	Won	
2010	Melon Music Awards	Song of the Year	Nominated	
2010	Melon Music Awards	Best Music Video	Nominated	
2010	Mnet Asian Music Awards	Song of the Year	Won	
2010	Mnet Asian Music Awards	Best Dance Performance – Female Group	Won	
2010	Seoul Music Awards	Digital Bonsang	Won	
2011	KOMCA Music Awards	Best Dance Song	Won	
2011	Korean Music Awards	Best Dance & Electronic Song	Won	
2011	Korean Music Awards	Song of the Year	Nominated	

Music program wins
Program	Date
M Countdown	July 22, 2010
Music Bank	July 23, 2010
Inkigayo	August 1, 2010

== Charts ==
=== Weekly charts ===
Chart (2010)	Peak position
South Korea (Gaon Digital Chart)	1

=== Year-end charts ===
Chart (2010)	Position
South Korea (Gaon Digital Chart)	1

== Sales ==
Country	Sales
South Korea (digital)	3,352,194
