= A Class (album) =

2011 studio album by Miss A

Studio album by Miss A
- Released: July 18, 2011
- Recorded: 2010–2011
- Genres: K-pop; dance-pop
- Length: 46:04
- Languages: Korean; English
- Labels: AQ/JYP; LOEN; KMP
- Producer: Park Jin-young

Miss A chronology
A Class (2011)	Touch (2012)

Singles from A Class
- 1. "Bad Girl Good Girl" Released: July 1, 2010; 2. "Breathe" Released: September 27, 2010; 3. "Love Alone" Released: May 2, 2011; 4. "Goodbye Baby" Released: July 18, 2011

A Class is the debut studio album by South Korean-Chinese girl group Miss A. The album was released on July 18, 2011, and contains thirteen songs. It contained six singles, including the award-winning "Bad Girl Good Girl".

== Background and release ==
Bad But Good, a four-song EP, was released on July 1, 2010. The EP included "Love Again" ("다시 사랑") and "Bad Girl Good Girl", which served as Miss A's first and second singles, released on June 30 and July 1, 2010, respectively. These two tracks plus album track "Break It" were later included on A Class; the track "Looking At Each Other" ("딱 마주쳐)" was not included. The group had their debut performance on July 1, 2010, with "Bad Girl Good Girl" on M.net M! Countdown.

A second four-track EP, Step Up, was released on September 27, 2010. Its track "Breathe" was used as the promotional single, and all the songs were later added to A Class. The "Breathe" music video shows the Miss A members dancing in a room with stripes of various colors. The members are also shown standing around a large cannon from which member Jia is about to be fired.

In July 2011, Miss A announced the upcoming release of their first full-length album called A Class. JYP CEO Park Jin-young uploaded a video of himself at a recording studio with Grammy-winning mixing engineer Manny Marroquin, who has worked with artists like Whitney Houston, Alicia Keys, Kanye West, and Bruno Mars. He also showed a 15-second preview of the group's new song "Goodbye Baby", which eventually became the album's lead single. The single was released on July 8, 2011, followed by the A Class album on July 18.

The album's next single, "Love Alone", was specially created for South Korean figure skating champion Kim Yuna's "Ice Show". The group performed the song as special guests on the show as Yuna and other figure skaters danced to the song. It was also the group's first song sung in the English language, and was released on May 2, 2011.

== Reception and awards ==
In 2010, "Bad Girl Good Girl" was awarded the Cyworld Song Of The Month on Cyworld, and placed at number 1 on the Gaon Weekly Digital Charts and number 1 on the 2010 Gaon Yearly Charts. The Bad but Good EP reached number 6 on the Gaon Weekly Album Chart and number 7 on the monthly chart. The Step Up EP made it to number 6 on Gaon's Weekly Albums Chart and number 10 on the monthly chart, and "Breathe" reached number 2 on Gaon's Weekly Digital Chart and number 27 for the year. Finally, A Class reached number 9 on the Gaon Weekly Albums Chart but finished at number 5 for the month and 44 for the year of 2011. "Good Bye Baby" and "Love Alone" went to numbers 1 and 6 on Gaon's Digital Charts, respectively.

"Bad Girl Good Girl" went on to win the Song of the Year award at the 2010 Mnet Asian Music Awards.

== Track listing ==
A Class track listing
No.	Title	Lyrics	Music	Arrangement	Length
1.	"One to Ten" (하나부터 열까지)	Kupa, Rado	Rado	Tommy Park	3:37
2.	"Good-bye Baby"	J.Y. Park "The Asiansoul"	J.Y. Park "The Asiansoul"	J.Y. Park "The Asiansoul", Shim Eun-ji	3:46
3.	"Help Me"	Hong Ji-sang	Hong Ji-sang	Hong Ji-sang	3:19
4.	"Break It"	Super Changddai	Tommy Park	Super Changddai, Tommy Park	3:50
5.	"Mr. Johnny"	Tommy Park, Kim Eun-soo	Tommy Park	Tommy Park	3:07
6.	"Play That Music DJ" (그 음악을 틀어줘요 DJ)	Super Changddai	Super Changddai	Super Changddai	3:17
7.	"Step Up"	Hong Ji-sang	Hong Ji-sang	Hong Ji-sang	2:47
8.	"Breathe"	J.Y. Park "The Asiansoul"	J.Y. Park "The Asiansoul"	J.Y. Park "The Asiansoul", Shim Eun-ji, Cho Jong-soo, Hong Ji-sang	3:34
9.	"Blankly" (멍하니)	Kim Hee-young	Shim Eun-ji	Shim Eun-ji	4:45
10.	"Love Again" (다시 사랑)	Super Changddai	Super Changddai	Super Changddai	3:26
11.	"Love Alone"	Ursula Yancy	Kahlil Feegel, Alexander Palmer		3:33
12.	"Bad Girl Good Girl"	J.Y. Park "The Asiansoul"	J.Y. Park "The Asiansoul"	J.Y. Park "The Asiansoul", Hong Ji-sang	3:37
13.	"Goodbye Baby" (Silver Mix)	J.Y. Park "The Asiansoul"	J.Y. Park "The Asiansoul"	J.Y. Park "The Asiansoul", Shim Eun-ji	3:53
Total length:					46:04

Taiwan deluxe edition
No.	Title	Lyrics	Music	Arrangement	Length
14.	"Bad Girl Good Girl" (Chinese version)	J.Y. Park "The Asiansoul"	J.Y. Park "The Asiansoul"	J.Y. Park "The Asiansoul", Hong Ji-sang
15.	"Breathe" (Chinese version)	J.Y. Park "The Asiansoul"	J.Y. Park "The Asiansoul"	J.Y. Park "The Asiansoul", Shim Eun-ji, Cho Jong-soo, Hong Ji-sang
16.	"Love Again" (再爱一次) (Chinese version)	Super Changddai	Kahlil Feegel, Alexander Palmer
17.	"Goodbye Baby" (Chinese version)	J.Y. Park "The Asiansoul"	J.Y. Park "The Asiansoul"	J.Y. Park "The Asiansoul", Shim Eun-ji

Taiwan deluxe edition DVD
No.	Title	Lyrics	Music	Arrangement	Length
1.	"Bad Girl Good Girl" (Chinese version; music video)	J.Y. Park "The Asiansoul"	J.Y. Park "The Asiansoul"	J.Y. Park "The Asiansoul", Hong Ji-sang
2.	"Breathe" (Chinese version; music video)	J.Y. Park "The Asiansoul"	J.Y. Park "The Asiansoul"	J.Y. Park "The Asiansoul", Shim Eun-ji, Cho Jong-soo, Hong Ji-sang
3.	"Goodbye Baby" (Chinese version; music video)	J.Y. Park "The Asiansoul"	J.Y. Park "The Asiansoul"	J.Y. Park "The Asiansoul", Shim Eun-ji

== Charts ==
Chart performance for A Class
Chart (2011)	Peak position
South Korean Weekly Albums (Gaon)	9
South Korean Monthly Albums (Gaon)	5
South Korean Yearly Albums (Gaon)	46

== Sales ==
Sales for A Class
Region	Amount
South Korea	31,885
