= Miss A =

Chinese-Korean girl group

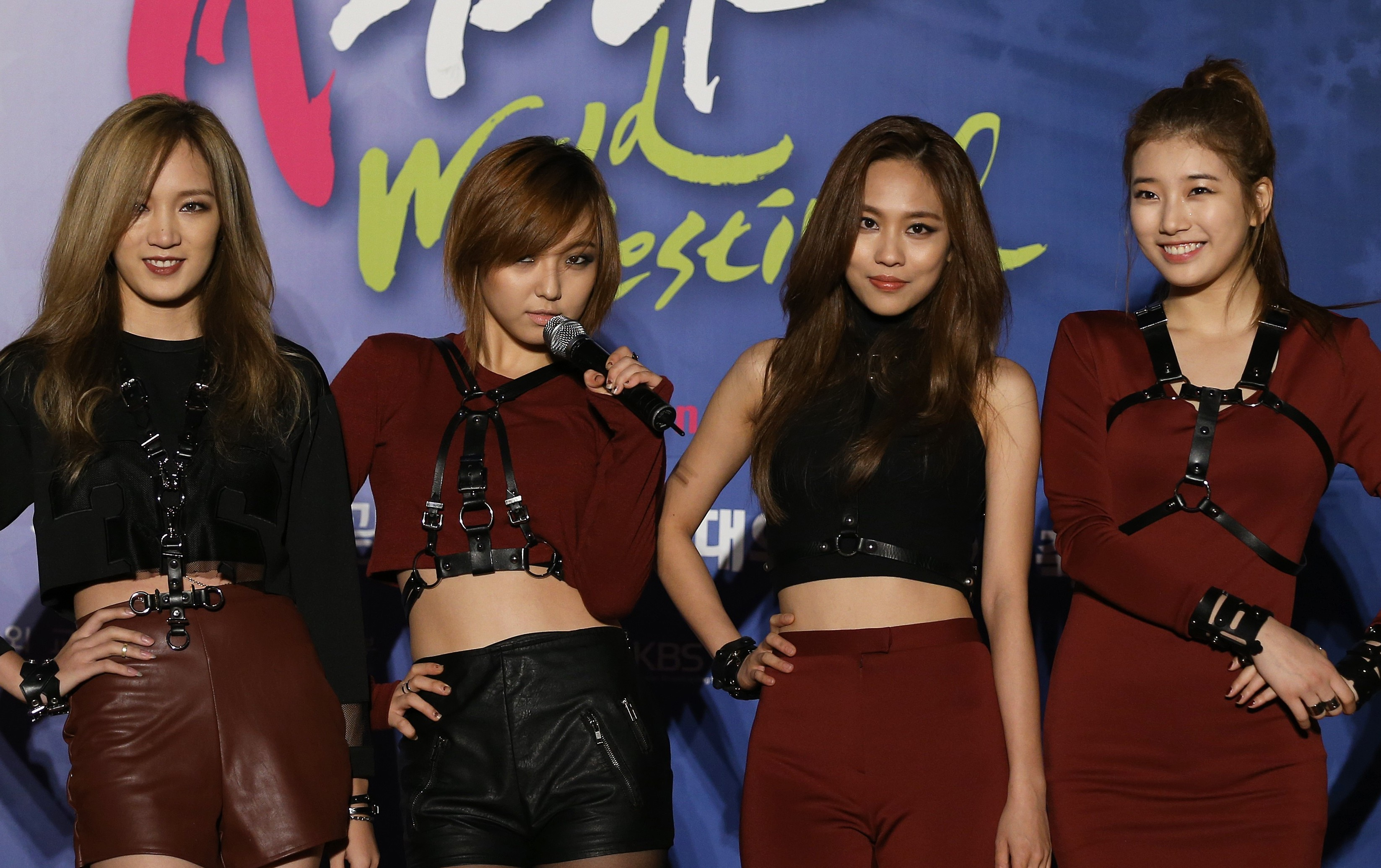
- Miss A in 2013; From left to right: Jia, Min, Fei, and Suzy

Background information
- Also known as: Miss Asia, JYP Sisters
- Origin: Seoul, South Korea
- Genres: K-pop; dance-pop; electropop
- Years active: 2010–2017
- Labels: AQ; Universal Music Group
- Past members: Fei; Jia; Min; Suzy

Miss A (Korean: 미쓰에이; stylized in all caps or miss A) was a South Korean girl group formed by AQ Entertainment, a subsidiary of JYP Entertainment. The group debuted in July 2010 with the single “Bad Girl Good Girl” as a quartet consisting of Fei, Jia, Min, and Suzy. Their debut song reached number one on the Gaon Digital Chart, which made them the first act ever to have their debut song reach the top of the chart; the song also became the best-performing single of 2010 on the chart.

Their debut studio album, A Class (2011) produced two more number one songs, and their follow-up extended plays, Touch and Independent Women Part III (both 2012), proved furthermore success. Their second studio album, Hush (2013), was well received by critics, and its title track has been covered on numerous occasions by girl groups and on survival reality shows. This would be followed by a year-long hiatus, until the release of their third extended play, Colors (2015), which would go on to become their last release before disbandment. In 2017, Billboard ranked Miss A at number ten on their “Top 10 K-pop Girl Groups of the Past Decade” list.

Member Jia left the group in May 2016, while member Min left the group in November 2017. In December 2017, JYP officially announced that Miss A has disbanded.

== History ==
Originally, the group consisted of five trainees who were formed by JYP Entertainment in 2010. They first appeared in Chinese variety shows performing dance routines and songs as the “Chinese Wonder Girls,” with Woo Hyerim as a member, who was placed in Wonder Girls soon before Miss A's debut in order to replace Sunmi. In March 2010, fifteen-year-old trainee Bae Suzy joined the group which then became a trio known as ‘Miss A.’ The group signed with the Samsung Electronics group in China and released a song used for the commercial called “Love Again” for the Samsung Beat Festival. Lee Min Young, a solo artist and a long-time trainee in America, also made a cameo appearance in the music video, and joined the group for their South Korean debut in April 2010.

=== 2010–2011: Debut, A Class, and Chinese debut ===
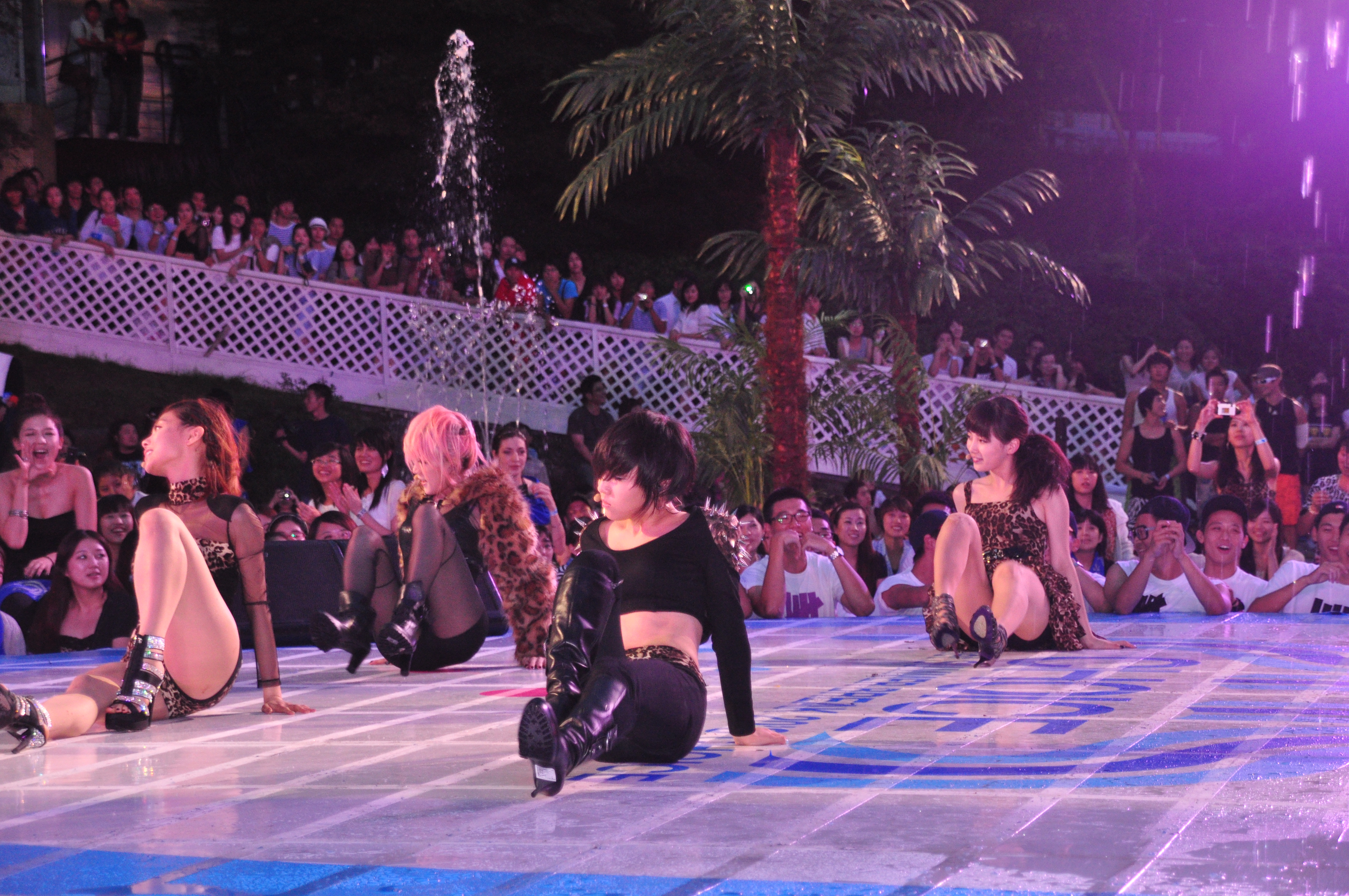
Miss A at Mnet 20's Choice Awards in 2010.

Miss A made their official debut in South Korea as a four-member group on July 1 with their single “Bad Girl Good Girl.” The song was taken from their debut single album Bad but Good. Miss A received first place in the on KBS Music Bank, becoming the fastest girl group to take the #1 spot on a music show at the time, taking only 22 days since debut.

The group also consequently got first place program Inkigayo from the SBS. On August 1, 2010, Miss A received their first “Mutizen” award on Mnet's M Countdown. The song stayed as the number 1 song for four straight weeks, breaking the previous record set by Girls' Generation.

The group later on made their comeback with their second single album called Step Up on September 26. The group promoted “Breathe” as the lead single for the single album and showed an “exotic and [...] doll-like transformation” that was completely different from their debut EP. The first performance was on M! Countdown on October 7. The group received first place on M! Countdown in the last week of October.

In May 2011, Miss A released “Love Alone,” a single from their unreleased album A Class. “Love Alone” was used as a promotional song for Yuna Kim's ice show, and Miss A performed the song at the opening of “All That Skate Spring 2011.”

Miss A announced their comeback with their first full album called A Class, which was released digitally on July 18, 2011. A Class consists of a mix of previously released hits and four new tracks, including the single “Good-bye Baby”. The album has 13 songs. They started promoting “Good Bye Baby” on July 21, 2011, on M.net's M! Countdown, followed by KBS's Music Bank, MBC's Show! Music Core, and SBS's Inkigayo. On the following week of promotions, they won all awards from the shows.

On September 30 of the same year, Miss A debuted in China with the release of a special edition of their first full album, containing a DVD with music videos, as well as Chinese versions of “Bad Girl Good Girl,” “Breathe,” “Good Bye Baby,” and “Love Again.” After the Chinese album release, it ranked #3 on Taiwan's G-Music Chart.

=== 2012: Touch and Independent Women Part III ===
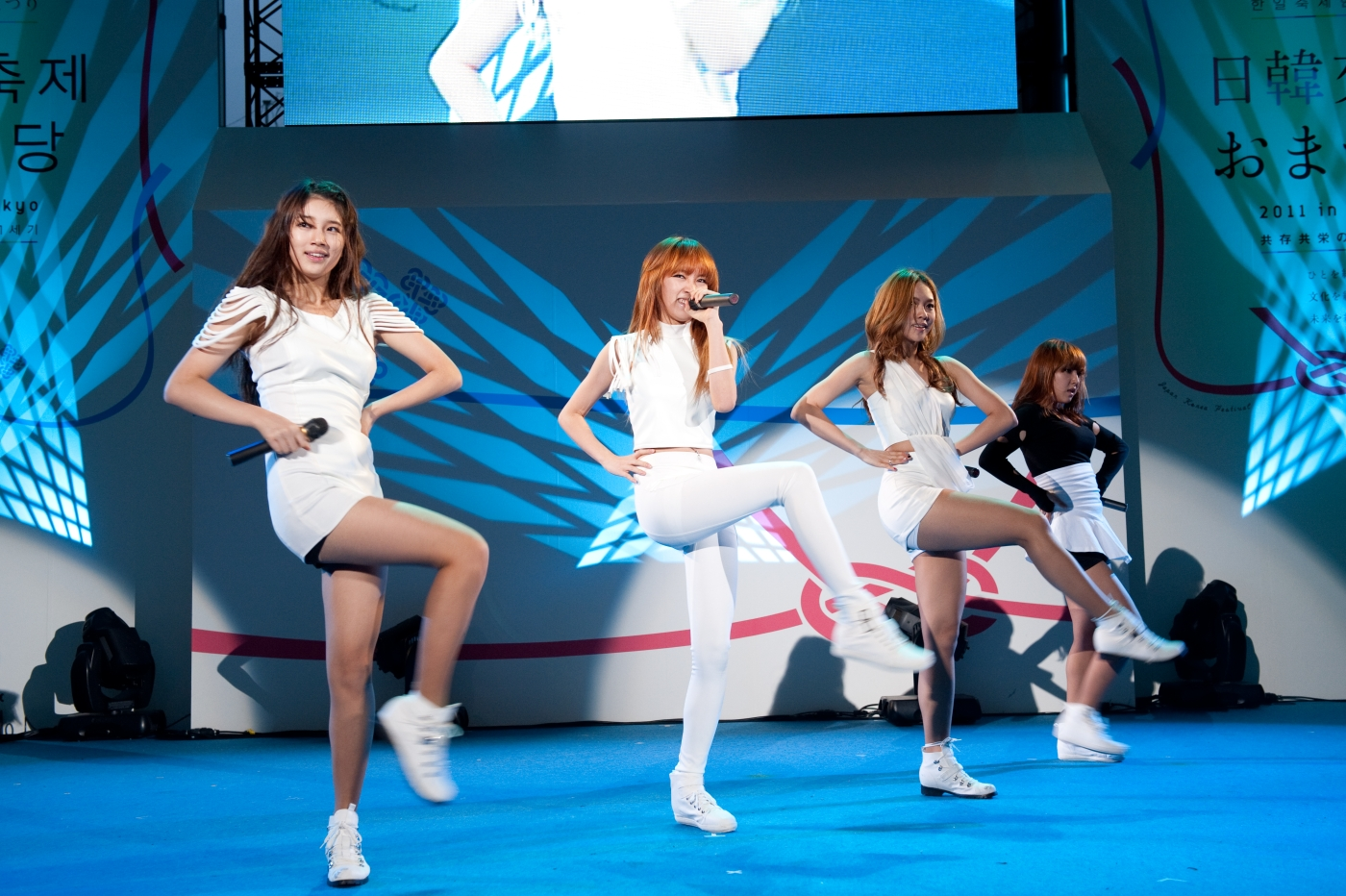
Miss A performing at Korea-Japan Festival in Tokyo in October 2011.

Miss A announced their comeback in Korea with an EP called Touch, released on February 20, 2012. On February 19, 2012, the music video was uploaded to YouTube through Miss A's official channel and gained over one million views in one day.

Touch, both the song and the album, peaked at #2 on Gaon Chart Digital Singles and Physical Albums rankings for the 4th week of February.

Miss A started their promotions for Touch on February 23 on Mnet's M Countdown and on other music shows respectively. On February 29, Miss A won the Champion Song on MBC M's Show Champion with the song “Touch.” On March 1, Touch also went to #1 on M.net M! Countdown. On March 4, they won Mutizen on SBS's Inkigayo with Touch. On March 7 Miss A won on jTBC Music On Top.

On March 22, popular Chinese video sharing site YinYueTai revealed Miss A's Chinese music video for “Touch.” On March 23, Miss A released a Chinese version of the Touch album in Hong Kong and Taiwan. This album contains the Korean and Chinese version of “Touch” and also the music videos under the DVD version. After the release, “Touch” immediately topped Chinese online charts.

The group wrapped up their promotions for the album by performing “Over U,” another song from the album, on each music program during their last week.

On October 8, 2012, Miss A announced their comeback with their fifth project album entitled Independent Women Part III. The five-track mini-album was released on October 15. On October 16, Miss A were involved in a minor car accident. They were taken to a hospital, and continued their schedules with only a few hours delay. They began their promotions for its lead single, “I Don't Need a Man,” on October 18. “I Don't Need a Man” was also included on Miss A's next album, Hush.

=== 2013–2017: Hush, Colors, final activities, and disbandment ===
On October 29, 2013, Miss A released their second studio album, Hush.

Miss A released their extended play Colors on March 30, 2015. This was accompanied by an online reality series, Real Miss A. The music video for the lead single, "Only You", gained more than 2 million views on YouTube within 24 hours. After the promotions of Colors had concluded, Miss A became inactive indefinitely. In May 2016, Jia left the group; according to management, the other members were focusing on solo activities at the time. In November 2017, it was reported that Min had also departed from the group as her contract with JYP Entertainment had come to an end.

On December 27, 2017, JYP Entertainment confirmed that the group had disbanded.

== Discography ==
Miss A's discography consists of 2 albums, three extended plays and 8 singles.

- Bad But Good (2010)
- Step Up (2010)
- A Class (2011)
- Touch (2012)
- Independent Women Part III (2012)
- Hush (2013)
- Colors (2015)

== See also ==
- List of best-selling girl groups
