= Bae Suzy discography =

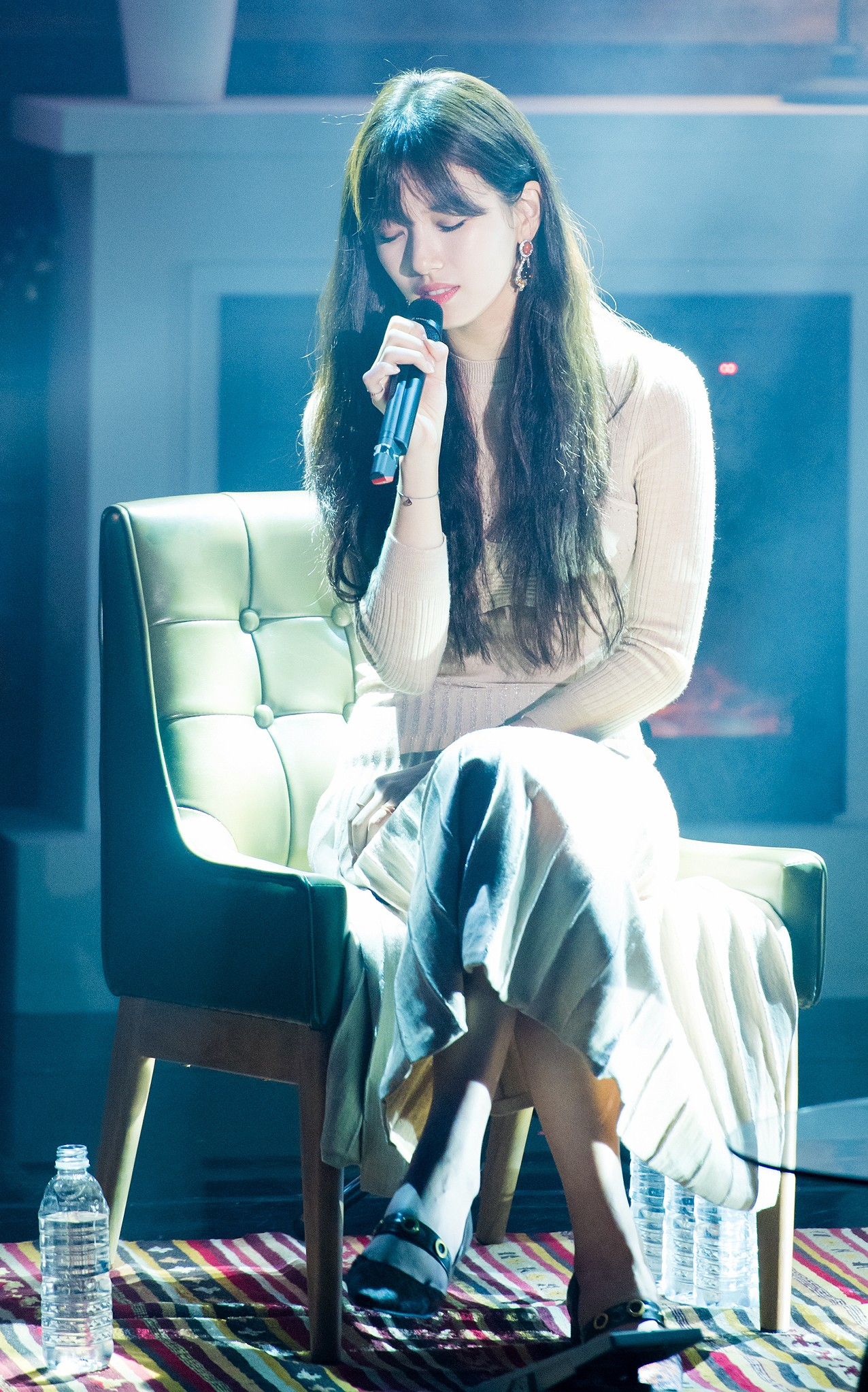
- EPs: 2
- Singles: 10
- Music videos: 13
- Collaborations: 4
- Soundtrack appearances: 22
- Promotional singles: 4

South Korean singer and actress Bae Suzy, known mononymously as Suzy, has released two extended plays, ten singles, and four promotional singles.

== Extended plays ==
List of extended plays, with selected chart positions and sales
Title	Details	Peak chart positions		Sales
Title	Details	KOR	US World	Sales
Yes? No?	Released: January 24, 2017; Label: JYP Entertainment; Formats: CD, digital download	2	15	KOR: 11,020
Faces of Love	Released: January 29, 2018; Label: JYP Entertainment; Formats: CD, digital download	6	—	KOR: 10,269

== Singles ==
=== As lead artist ===
Title	Year	Peak chart positions		Sales (Download)	Album
Title	Year	KOR	KOR Hot	Sales (Download)	Album
"Pretend" (행복한 척)	2017	2	—N/a	KOR: 765,502	Yes? No?
"Yes No Maybe"	2017	19	—N/a	KOR: 148,108	Yes? No?
"Because I Love You" (사랑하기 때문에)	2017	— (Note: "Because I Love You" did not enter the Circle Digital Chart, but peaked at number 15 on the Circle BGM Chart.)	—	—N/a	30 Years Yoo Jae-ha, Forever as We Are
"I'm in Love with Someone Else" (다른 사람을 사랑하고 있어)	2018	3	3	—N/a	Faces of Love
"Holiday" (feat. DPR Live)	2018	17	17	—N/a	Faces of Love
"SObeR"	2018	— (Note: "SObeR" did not enter the Circle Digital Chart, but appeared at number 85 on the Circle Download Chart.)	—	—N/a	Faces of Love
"Midnight" (잘자 내 몫까지) (feat. Yiruma)	2018	— (Note: "Midnight" did not enter the Circle Digital Chart, but appeared at number 81 on the Circle Download Chart.)	—	—N/a	Faces of Love
"Satellite"	2022	117	58	—N/a	Non-album single
"Cape"	2022	— (Note: "Cape" did not enter the Circle Digital Chart, but peaked at number 44 on the Circle Download Chart.)	—N/a	—N/a	Non-album single
"Come Back"	2025	— (Note: "Come Back" did not enter the Circle Digital Chart, but peaked at number 21 on the Circle Download Chart.)	—N/a	—N/a	Non-album single
"—" denotes releases that did not chart or were not released in that region. Note: Billboard Korea K-Pop Hot 100 was discontinued between July 2014 and June 2017, and since April 2022.

=== As featured artist ===
Title	Year	Peak chart positions	Album
Title	Year	KOR	Album
"Before This Song Ends" (이 노래가 끝나기 전에) (JJ Project feat. Suzy)	2012	139	Bounce
"I Won't Do Bad Things" (나쁜 짓안 할게요) (B1A4 narration by Suzy)	2012	82	In The Wind
"Together in Love" (幸福特調) (Show Lo feat. Suzy)	2015	—	Reality Show?
"Out of Breath" (행복해지고 싶어) (Babylon feat. Suzy)	2019	—	Non-album single
"Because I Love You" (널 사랑하니까) (Kang Seung-won feat. Suzy)	2022	— (Note: "Because I Love You" did not enter the Circle Digital Chart, but appeared at number 89 on the Circle Download Chart.)	Kang Seungwon 2nd
"—" denotes releases that did not chart or were not released in that region.

== Collaborations ==
Title	Year	Peak chart positions		Sales (Download)	Album
Title	Year	KOR	US World	Sales (Download)	Album
"Farewell Under the Sun" (대낮에 한 이별) (with Bernard Park)	2014	40	—	KOR: 92,093	JYP Nation Korea 2014 'One Mic'
"Dream" (with Baekhyun)	2016	1	3	KOR: 1,360,267; KOR: 36,900 (phy.)	Dream
"Dream (Club Live Ver.)" (with Baekhyun)	2016	46	—	KOR: 35,140	Dream
"Don't Wait for Your Love" (기다리지 말아요) (with Park Won)	2017	16	—	KOR: 117,608	Non-album single
"—" denotes releases that did not chart or were not released in that region.

== Soundtrack appearances ==
Title	Year	Peak chart positions		Sales (Download)	Album
Title	Year	KOR	KOR Hot	Sales (Download)	Album
"Dream High" (드림하이) (with Taecyeon, Wooyoung, Kim Soo-hyun, JOO)	2011	41	—N/a	—N/a	Dream High OST
"Winter Child" (겨울아이)	2011	12	—N/a	KOR: 1,004,966	Dream High OST
"So Many Tears" (눈물이 많아서)	2011	7	3	KOR: 1,103,111	Me Too, Flower OST
"You're My Star"	2012	23	41	KOR: 389,878	Dream High 2 OST
"I Still Love You" (그래도 사랑해)	2012	15	19	KOR: 523,715	Big OST
"Don't Forget Me" (나를 잊지말아요)	2013	12	5	KOR: 590,321	Gu Family Book OST
"Why Am I Like This" (왜 이럴까)	2015	22	—N/a	KOR: 175,074	The Time We Were Not in Love OST
"Ring My Bell"	2016	18	—N/a	KOR: 343,613	Uncontrollably Fond OST
"When We Were" (좋을땐)	2016	84	—N/a	KOR: 26,583	Uncontrollably Fond OST
"I Love You Boy"	2017	13	60	KOR: 135,855	While You Were Sleeping OST
"I Wanna Say To You" (듣고 싶은 말)	2017	58	—	KOR: 65,806	While You Were Sleeping OST
"My Dear Love"	2020	142	—	—N/a	Start-Up OST
"Inevitable" (안하기가 쉽지 않아요)	2022	184	—N/a	—N/a	Extraordinary Attorney Woo OST
"R.U.N" (전속력으로)	2023	— (Note: "R.U.N" did not enter the Circle Digital Chart, but appeared at number 55 on the Circle Download Chart.)	—N/a	—N/a	R U Next? Theme Song
"Ordinary Days" (보통의 날)	2023	— (Note: "Ordinary Days" did not enter the Circle Digital Chart, but peaked at number 97 on the Circle Download Chart.)	—N/a	—N/a	Doona! OST
"Ordinary Days (Live Band Ver.)"	2023	—	—N/a	—N/a	Doona! OST
"Undercover"	2023	—	—N/a	—N/a	Doona! OST
"The Whispering Spell" (네 꿈에 숨어들어가) (as part of Dream Sweet)	2023	—	—N/a	—N/a	Doona! OST
"Waiting on a Wish" (간절한 소원)	2025	— (Note: "Waiting on a Wish" did not enter the Circle Digital Chart, but appeared at number 90 on the Circle Download Chart.)	—N/a	—N/a	Snow White OST
"Dream High" (with D.O., Jeong Dong-won feat. Lim Se-jun, Yoon Seo-bin)	2025	— (Note: "Dream High" did not enter the Circle Digital Chart, but peaked at number 29 on the Circle Download Chart.)	—N/a	—N/a	SHOW MUSICAL Dream High OST
"A Night Full of You" (너로 가득찬 밤) (with So Soo-bin)	2025	— (Note: "A Night Full of You" did not enter the Circle Digital Chart, but peaked at number 45 on the Circle Download Chart.)	—N/a	—N/a	Genie, Make a Wish OST
"A Day" (하루)	2025	—	—N/a	—N/a	Exchange 4 OST
"—" denotes releases that did not chart or were not released in that region. Note: Billboard Korea K-Pop Hot 100 was introduced in August 2011 and discontinued between July 2014 and June 2017, and since April 2022.

== Other charted songs ==
Title	Year	Peak chart positions	Sales (Download)	Album
Title	Year	KOR	Sales (Download)	Album
"Sick and Tired" (다 그런거잖아) (feat. Reddy)	2017	71	KOR: 25,389	Yes? No?
"Les Préférences" (취향)	2017	— (Note: "Les Préférences" did not enter the Circle Digital Chart, but appeared at number 76 on the Circle Download Chart.)	KOR: 18,392	Yes? No?
"Question Mark" (난로 마냥)	2017	— (Note: "Question Mark" did not enter the Circle Digital Chart, but appeared at number 89 on the Circle Download Chart.)	KOR: 16,980	Yes? No?
"Little Wildflower" (꽃마리)	2017	— (Note: "Little Wildflower" did not enter the Circle Digital Chart, but appeared at number 78 on the Circle Download Chart.)	KOR: 18,157	Yes? No?
"—" denotes releases that did not chart or were not released in that region.

== Promotional singles ==
Title	Year	Peak chart positions		Sales (Download)	Product
Title	Year	KOR	KOR Hot	Sales (Download)	Product
"Come Out If You Love Me" (사랑한다면 밖으로 나와) (with Choo Seung-yeop of Achtung)	2012	—	—	—	Bean Pole
"Classic" (with JYP, Taecyeon, Wooyoung)	2012	58	66	KOR: 60,635	Reebok Classic
"Moment" (with Deokwon of Broccoli, You Too?)	2012	— (Note: "Moment" did not enter the Circle Digital Chart, but peaked at number 1 on the Circle BGM Chart.)	—	—	Canon EOS M
"Wind, Wind, Wind" (바람바람바람)	2014	— (Note: "Wind, Wind, Wind" did not enter the Circle Digital Chart, but peaked at number 2 on the Circle BGM Chart.)	—	—	Bean Pole
"—" denotes releases that did not chart or were not released in that region.

== Songwriting and composing credits ==
All song credits are adapted from the Korea Music Copyright Association's database unless stated otherwise.

Year	Album	Song	Lyrics		Music	
Year	Album	Song	Credited	With	Credited	With
2015	Colors	"I Caught Ya"	Yes	—N/a	No	—
2016	Uncontrollably Fond OST	"When We Were" (좋을땐)	Yes	—N/a	Yes	Shim Eun-ji
2017	Yes? No?	"Les Préférences" (취향)	Yes	—N/a	No	—
2017	Yes? No?	"Question Mark" (난로 마냥)	Yes	—N/a	Yes	Jo Hyun-ah
2018	Faces of Love	"SObeR"	Yes	—N/a	No	—
2018	Faces of Love	"Bxatxh" (나쁜X)	Yes	—N/a	Yes	Shim Eun-ji
2018	Faces of Love	"Sleeplessness" (너는 밤새도록)	Yes	—N/a	No	—
2019	Non-album single	"Out of Breath" (행복해지고 싶어)	Yes	Babylon, Armadillo	No	—
2022	Non-album single	"Satellite"	Yes	—	No	—
2022	Non-album single	"Cape"	Yes	—	Yes	Kang Hyun-min

== Music videos ==
Year	Title	Album	Director
2015	"Together in Love" (幸福特調) (Show Lo featuring Suzy)	Reality Show?	Unknown
2016	"Dream" (with Baekhyun)	Dream	Hwang Soo-Ah
2017	"Yes No Maybe"	Yes? No?	Hobin (a Hobin film)
2017	"Don't Wait for Your Love" (기다리지 말아요) (with Park Won)	Non-album single	Unknown
2018	"I'm in Love with Someone Else" (다른 사람을 사랑하고 있어)	Faces of Love	Yun Kim
2018	"Holiday" (featuring DPR Live)	Faces of Love	VISUALSFROM.
2018	"SObeR"	Faces of Love	Tiger Cave
2018	"Midnight" (잘자 내 몫까지) (featuring Yiruma)	Faces of Love	Yeom Woojin
2022	"Satellite" (starring Monika Shin)	Non-album single	Lee Suho (Boring Studio)
2022	"Cape"	Non-album single	Unknown
2025	"Come Back"	Non-album single	Suzy Kang
2025	"Come Back (Story Ver.)"	Non-album single	Suzy Kang
2025	"Waiting on a Wish" (간절한 소원)	Non-album single	Shim Jihyoung

== See also ==
- Miss A discography
