= List of awards and nominations received by Bae Suzy =

Bae Suzy awards and nominations
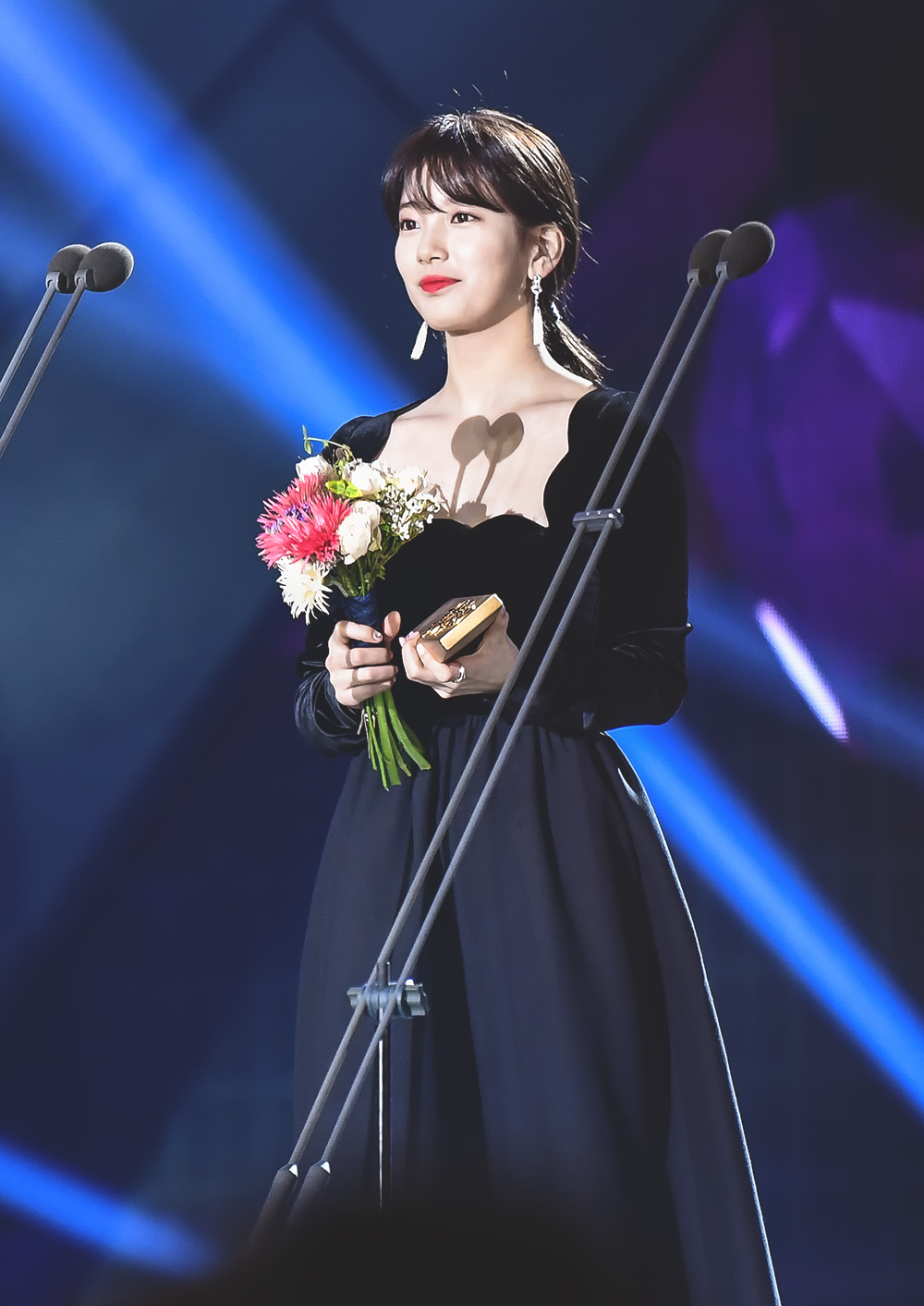
- Bae at the 2018 Baeksang Arts Awards
Awards and nominations
| Award | Wins | Nominations |
| APAN Star Awards | 0 | 5 |
| Asia Artist Awards | 3 | 4 |
| Asian Pop Music Awards | 2 | 4 |
| Baeksang Art Awards | 4 | 6 |
| Blue Dragon Film Awards | 1 | 2 |
| Blue Dragon Series Awards | 1 | 1 |
| Brand of the Year Awards | 1 | 1 |
| Buil Film Awards | 0 | 1 |
| Content Asia Awards | 1 | 1 |
| Director's Cut Awards | 1 | 1 |
| Fashionista Awards | 0 | 3 |
| Fundex Awards | 0 | 1 |
| Gaon Chart Music Awards | 0 | 2 |
| Genie Music Awards | 0 | 3 |
| Golden Disc Awards | 1 | 1 |
| Grand Bell Awards | 0 | 1 |
| InStyle Star Icon | 0 | 2 |
| KBS Drama Awards | 3 | 9 |
| KBS Entertainment Awards | 2 | 2 |
| Korea Drama Awards | 0 | 3 |
| Korea First Brand Awards | 3 | 3 |
| Korean Advertisers Association Awards | 1 | 1 |
| MBC Drama Awards | 2 | 2 |
| Melon Music Awards | 1 | 1 |
| Mnet 20's Choice Awards | 3 | 3 |
| Mnet Asian Music Awards | 1 | 5 |
| MTN Broadcast Advertisement Festival | 1 | 1 |
| SBS Drama Awards | 4 | 6 |
| Seoul International Drama Awards | 3 | 6 |
| Seoul Music Awards | 0 | 2 |
| Sina Weibo Night Awards | 1 | 1 |
| Style Icon Asia | 1 | 1 |

Totals (Note: Certain award groups do not simply award one winner. They acknowledge several different recipients, have runners-up, and have third place. Since this is a specific recognition and is different from losing an award, runner-up mentions are considered wins in this award tally. For simplification and to avoid errors, each award in this list has been presumed to have had a prior nomination.)
- Wins: 41
- Nominations: 85

This is a list of awards and nominations received by South Korean singer and actress Bae Suzy. She was the first female celebrity to win a rookie award in all three fields of music, television and movies, and the youngest recipient of a Style Icon Asia award.

== Awards and nominations ==
Name of the award ceremony, year presented, category, nominee of the award, and the result of the nomination
| Award ceremony | Year | Category | Nominee / Work | Result | Ref. |
|---|---|---|---|---|---|
| APAN Star Awards | 2016 | Excellence Award, Actress in a Miniseries | Uncontrollably Fond | Nominated | |
| APAN Star Awards | 2018 | Excellence Award, Actress in a Miniseries | While You Were Sleeping | Nominated | |
| APAN Star Awards | 2018 | K-Star Award, Actress | While You Were Sleeping | Nominated | |
| APAN Star Awards | 2022 | Top Excellence Award, Actress in an OTT Drama | Anna | Nominated | |
| APAN Star Awards | 2022 | Popularity Star Award, Actress | Anna | Nominated | |
| Asia Artist Awards | 2016 | Best Star Award | Uncontrollably Fond | Won | |
| Asia Artist Awards | 2017 | Asia Star Award, Actress | While You Were Sleeping | Won | |
| Asia Artist Awards | 2018 | Asia Celebrity Award | Bae Suzy | Won | |
| Asia Artist Awards | 2026 | Popularity Award – Actress | Bae Suzy | Pending | |
| Asian Pop Music Awards | 2022 | Best Music Video (Overseas) | "Satellite" | Won | |
| Asian Pop Music Awards | 2022 | Best OST (Overseas) | "Inevitable" | Nominated | |
| Asian Pop Music Awards | 2023 | Best OST (Overseas) | "Ordinary Days" | Nominated | |
| Asian Pop Music Awards | 2023 | Top 20 Songs of the Year (Overseas) | "Ordinary Days" | Won | |
| Baeksang Art Awards | 2011 | Best New Actress – Television | Dream High | Nominated | |
| Baeksang Art Awards | 2012 | Best New Actress – Film | Architecture 101 | Won | |
| Baeksang Art Awards | 2016 | Most Popular Actress – Film | The Sound of a Flower | Won | |
| Baeksang Art Awards | 2016 | InStyle Fashionista Award | Bae Suzy | Won | |
| Baeksang Art Awards | 2018 | Most Popular Actress – Television | While You Were Sleeping | Won | |
| Baeksang Art Awards | 2023 | Best Actress – Television | Anna | Nominated | |
| Blue Dragon Film Awards | 2012 | Best New Actress | Architecture 101 | Nominated | |
| Blue Dragon Film Awards | 2012 | Popular Star Award | Architecture 101 | Won | |
| Blue Dragon Series Awards | 2023 | Best Actress | Anna | Won | |
| Brand of the Year Awards | 2018 | Actress of the Year | While You Were Sleeping | Won | |
| Buil Film Awards | 2012 | Best New Actress | Architecture 101 | Nominated | |
| Content Asia Awards | 2023 | Best Female Lead in a TV Programme/Series Made in Asia | Anna | Won | |
| Director's Cut Awards | 2023 | Best Actress in a Series | Anna | Won | |
| Fashionista Awards | 2015 | Best Fashionista – Make-up Sector | Bae Suzy | Nominated | |
| Fashionista Awards | 2016 | Best Dresser – Female | Bae Suzy | Nominated | |
| Fashionista Awards | 2017 | Best Fashionista – Red Carpet Category | Bae Suzy | Nominated | |
| Fundex Awards | 2023 | Best Actress of OTT Drama | Doona! | Nominated | |
| Gaon Chart Music Awards | 2017 | Song of the Year – January | "Dream" (with Baekhyun) | Nominated | |
| Gaon Chart Music Awards | 2018 | Song of the Year – January | "Pretend" | Nominated | |
| Genie Music Awards | 2018 | Best Female Artist | Bae Suzy | Nominated | |
| Genie Music Awards | 2018 | Genie Music Popularity Award | Bae Suzy | Nominated | |
| Genie Music Awards | 2018 | Artist of the Year | Bae Suzy | Nominated | |
| Golden Disc Awards | 2017 | Best Digital Song (Bonsang) | "Dream" (with Baekhyun) | Won | |
| Grand Bell Awards | 2012 | Best New Actress | Architecture 101 | Nominated | |
| InStyle Star Icon | 2016 | Best Idol Actress | The Sound of a Flower | Nominated | |
| InStyle Star Icon | 2016 | Best Female Beauty Model | "The Face Shop" | Nominated | |
| KBS Drama Awards | 2011 | Best New Actress | Dream High | Won | |
| KBS Drama Awards | 2011 | Best Couple Award (with Kim Soo-hyun) | Dream High | Won | |
| KBS Drama Awards | 2011 | Excellence Award, Actress in a Miniseries | Dream High | Nominated | |
| KBS Drama Awards | 2012 | Excellence Award, Actress in a Miniseries | Big | Nominated | |
| KBS Drama Awards | 2012 | Popularity Award, Actress | Big | Won | |
| KBS Drama Awards | 2016 | Top Excellence Award, Actress | Uncontrollably Fond | Nominated | |
| KBS Drama Awards | 2016 | Excellence Award, Actress in a Mid-length Drama | Uncontrollably Fond | Nominated | |
| KBS Drama Awards | 2016 | Netizen Award | Uncontrollably Fond | Nominated | |
| KBS Drama Awards | 2016 | Best Couple Award (with Kim Woo-bin) | Uncontrollably Fond | Nominated | |
| KBS Entertainment Awards | 2012 | Best Female Newcomer in a Variety Show | Invincible Youth Season 2 | Won | |
| KBS Entertainment Awards | 2012 | Best Cameo Appearance | Gag Concert | Won | |
| Korea Drama Awards | 2011 | Best New Actress | Dream High | Nominated | |
| Korea Drama Awards | 2013 | Excellence Award, Actress | Gu Family Book | Nominated | |
| Korea Drama Awards | 2013 | Best Couple Award (with Lee Seung-gi) | Gu Family Book | Nominated | |
| Korea First Brand Awards | 2020 | Actress of the Year | Start-Up | Won | |
| Korea First Brand Awards | 2024 | Best Actress – OTT | Doona! | Won | |
| Korea First Brand Awards | 2026 | Best Actress – OTT | Genie, Make a Wish | Won | |
| Korean Advertisers Association Awards | 2013 | Best Model Award | Bae Suzy | Won | |
| MBC Drama Awards | 2013 | Top Excellence Award, Actress in a Miniseries | Gu Family Book | Won | |
| MBC Drama Awards | 2013 | Best Couple Award (with Lee Seung-gi) | Gu Family Book | Won | |
| Melon Music Awards | 2016 | Best R&B / Soul | "Dream" (with Baekhyun) | Won | |
| Mnet 20's Choice Awards | 2011 | Hot New Star | Dream High | Won | |
| Mnet 20's Choice Awards | 2012 | Hot Movie Star – Female | Architecture 101 | Won | |
| Mnet 20's Choice Awards | 2013 | 20's Drama Star – Female | Gu Family Book | Won | |
| Mnet Asian Music Awards | 2013 | Best OST | "Don't Forget Me" | Nominated | |
| Mnet Asian Music Awards | 2016 | Best Collaboration | "Dream" (with Baekhyun) | Won | |
| Mnet Asian Music Awards | 2017 | Best Female Artist | Bae Suzy | Nominated | |
| Mnet Asian Music Awards | 2017 | Best OST | "I Love You Boy" | Nominated | |
| Mnet Asian Music Awards | 2026 | Best OST | "A Day" | Pending | |
| MTN Broadcast Advertisement Festival | 2012 | Women's CF Model Award | Bae Suzy | Won | |
| SBS Drama Awards | 2017 | Grand Prize (Daesang) | While You Were Sleeping | Nominated | |
| SBS Drama Awards | 2017 | Top Excellence Award, Actress in a Wednesday–Thursday Drama | While You Were Sleeping | Won | |
| SBS Drama Awards | 2017 | Best Couple Award (with Lee Jong-suk) | While You Were Sleeping | Won | |
| SBS Drama Awards | 2019 | Best Couple Award (with Lee Seung-gi) | Vagabond | Won | |
| SBS Drama Awards | 2019 | Top Excellence Award, Actress in a Miniseries | Vagabond | Won | |
| SBS Drama Awards | 2019 | Producer Award | Vagabond | Nominated | |
| Seoul International Drama Awards | 2012 | Outstanding Korean Actress | Dream High | Nominated | |
| Seoul International Drama Awards | 2013 | Outstanding Korean Actress | Gu Family Book | Won | |
| Seoul International Drama Awards | 2013 | Outstanding Korean OST | "Don't Forget Me" | Nominated | |
| Seoul International Drama Awards | 2021 | Outstanding Korean Actress | Start-Up | Won | |
| Seoul International Drama Awards | 2023 | Best Actress (International Category) | Anna | Won | |
| Seoul International Drama Awards | 2026 | Outstanding Asian Star (South Korea) | Genie, Make a Wish | Nominated | |
| Seoul Music Awards | 2026 | Popularity Award | Bae Suzy | Nominated | |
| Seoul Music Awards | 2026 | New Icon Award | Bae Suzy | Nominated | |
| Sina Weibo Night Awards | 2015 | Goddess Award | Bae Suzy | Won | |
| Style Icon Asia | 2012 | Teenagers' Style Icon | Bae Suzy | Won | |

== Other accolades ==
=== Listicles ===
Name of publisher, year listed, name of listicle, and placement
| Publisher | Year | Listicle | Placement | Ref. |
|---|---|---|---|---|
| Forbes | 2014 | Korea Power Celebrity | 3rd | |
| Forbes | 2015 | Korea Power Celebrity | 34th | |
| Forbes | 2016 | Korea Power Celebrity | 39th | |
| Forbes | 2017 | Korea Power Celebrity | 6th | |
| Forbes | 2018 | Korea Power Celebrity | 12th | |
| Forbes | 2021 | Korea Power Celebrity | 23rd | |
| Forbes | 2022 | Korea Power Celebrity | 22nd | |
| Forbes | 2025 | Korea Power Celebrity | 38th | |
| Forbes | 2026 | Korea Power Celebrity | 31st | |
| Forbes | 2020 | 100 Digital Stars (Asia) | Included | |
| Forbes | 2021 | 30 Under 30 Asia | Included | |

== See also ==
- List of awards and nominations received by Miss A
