= Bae Suzy =

South Korean singer and actress (born 1994)

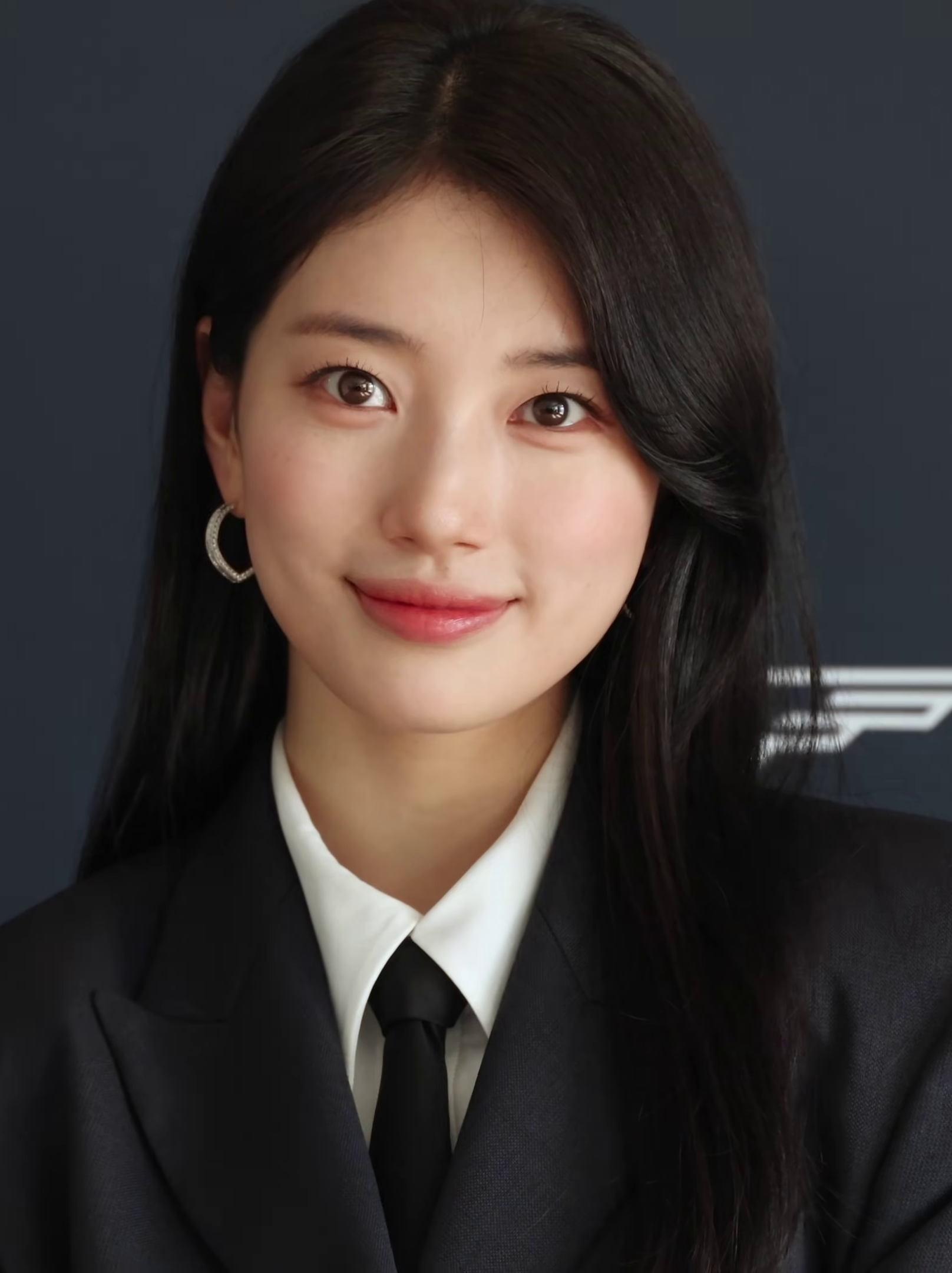
- Bae in 2026
- Born: Bae Su-ji; October 10, 1994 (age 32); Gwangju, South Korea
- Education: School of Performing Arts Seoul
- Occupations: Singer; actress; model
- Years active: 2010–present
- Agent: Management Soop
- Works: Discography; filmography
- Musical career
- Genres: K-pop; dance-pop
- Instrument: Vocals
- Label: JYP
- Formerly of: Miss A; JYP Nation

Korean name
- Hangul: 배수지
- Hanja: 裵秀智
- RR: Bae Suji
- MR: Pae Suji
- IPA: pɛ.su.dʑi

Bae Su-ji (Korean: 배수지; born October 10, 1994), anglicized as Bae Suzy, and also known mononymously as Suzy, is a South Korean singer and actress. A former member of girl group Miss A (2010–2017), she made her debut as an actress in 2011 with the television series Dream High and starred in the film Architecture 101 (2012). Following the latter's success, Bae has been nicknamed the "Nation's First Love" by South Korean media outlets. She then starred in dramas Gu Family Book (2013), Uncontrollably Fond (2016), and While You Were Sleeping (2017). In 2017, she made her debut as a solo recording artist with the extended play Yes? No?, and gained further prominence after starring in the television series Anna (2022) and Doona! (2023), as well as the films Ashfall (2019) and Wonderland (2024).

== Early life ==
Bae Su-ji was born in Buk District, Gwangju, South Korea on October 10, 1994, to Bae Wan-young, former coach of the Korean national youth taekwondo team, and Jeong Hyun-sook. She has an elder sister and a younger brother. She attended the School of Performing Arts Seoul and graduated in 2013. Before debuting, she was an online shopping model and was part of a street dancing crew to show her parents that she was serious about becoming an idol.

== Career ==
=== 2009–2010: Beginnings with Miss A ===
In 2009, Bae auditioned for Mnet Superstar K and made it through the preliminary round but was ultimately eliminated. However, she caught the attention of a scout from JYP Entertainment and soon became a trainee after singing an excerpt from Younha's "Love". In March 2010, Bae became a member of the group Miss A.

=== 2010–2016: Rising popularity and acting debut ===
In October 2010, Bae became the fixed host for MBC Show! Music Core alongside Minho and Onew, both members of Shinee, and Jiyeon, of T-ara. She left it in October 2011 and later hosted other events such as the Seoul Music Awards, Golden Disc Awards, and Mnet 20's Choice Awards where she won an award under the category "Hot New Star of 2011".

Apart from her group activities, Bae ventured into acting. She made her acting debut in the teen drama Dream High, which aired on KBS from January 3 to February 28. She also released a soundtrack for it, titled "Winter Child". The drama was a local success, earning high ratings during its two-month run, and also gained popularity in other countries. At the KBS Drama Awards, Bae won the Best New Actress award and the Best Couple award with co-star Kim Soo-hyun. She also became a cast member in KBS' reality show Invincible Youth 2. The show began filming on October 19 and aired on November 11.

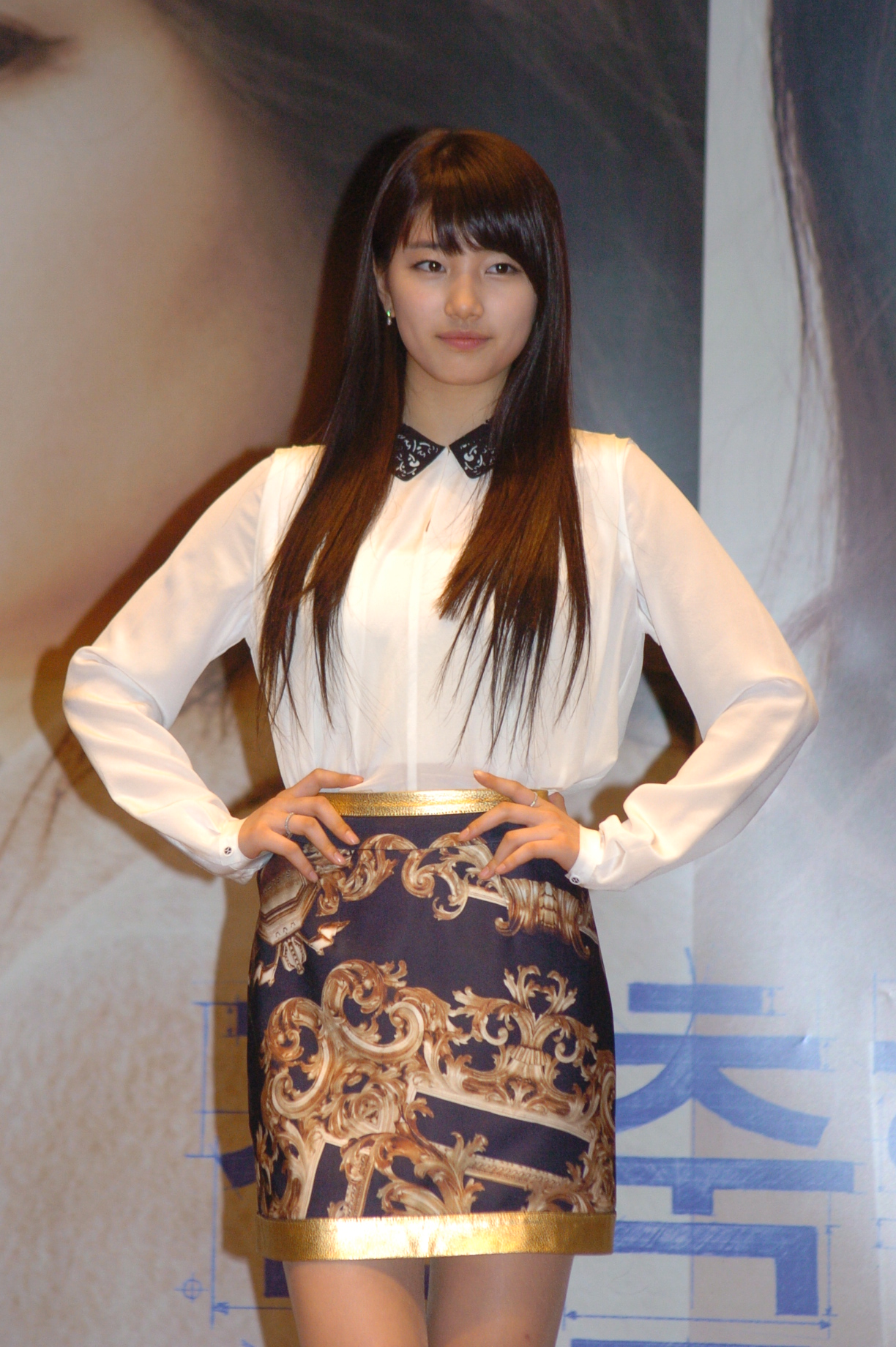
Bae at the press conference for Architecture 101, February 2012

In 2012, Bae made her film debut with Architecture 101, playing the younger version of the female protagonist. Architecture 101 was one of the ten most-watched films in South Korea in the first quarter of 2012, and achieved over 4.1 million admissions nine weeks after its theater release, a new box-office record for Korean melodramas. The same year, Bae played a supporting role in the romantic comedy Big, written by the Hong sisters and starring Gong Yoo and Lee Min-jung.

Bae was the first Korean female celebrity to win a singer rookie award, drama rookie award, film rookie award, and variety rookie award. She received the Best New Actress award at the 48th Baeksang Arts Awards for her acting performance in Architecture 101, and the Best Newcomer award in the variety category at the KBS Entertainment Awards for her stint in Invincible Youth 2.

In 2013, she starred in the fusion sageuk Gu Family Book alongside Lee Seung-gi. She received acting recognition at the MBC Drama Awards, winning the Top Excellence award and at the Seoul International Drama Awards, winning the Outstanding Actress award. She also featured on the variety show Healing Camp, becoming the youngest guest on the show.

In May 2014, Bae was cast in the film The Sound of a Flower as Jin Chae-seon, Korea's first female pansori singer. The film, which was released in 2015, depicts the struggle of a singer who is not allowed to perform in public because of her gender during the Joseon era. To prepare herself for the role, Bae received training in pansori for a year. The same year, she collaborated with Taiwanese singer-actor Show Lo in the single "Together In Love", featured in his album Reality Show?.

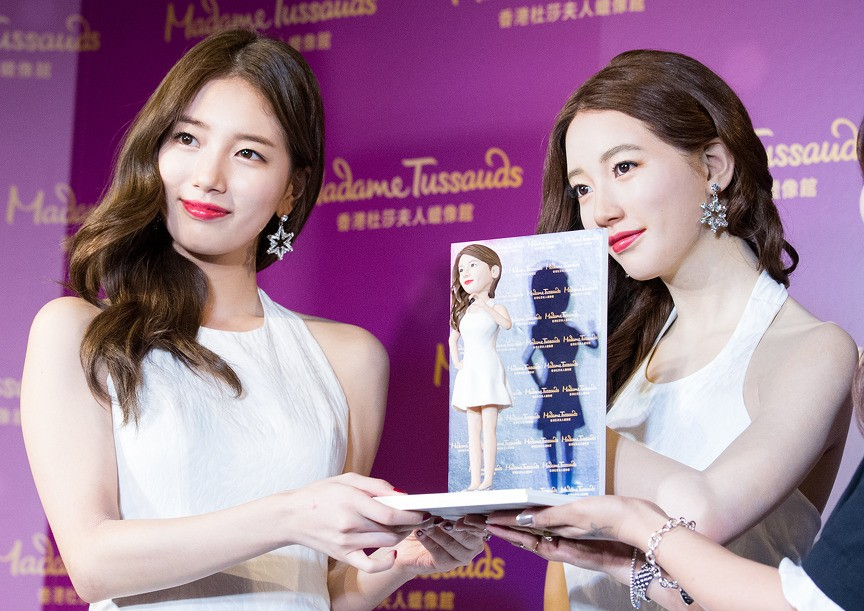
Bae with her wax figure at Madame Tussauds Hong Kong on September 13, 2016

In January 2016, Bae released a digital single titled "Dream" in collaboration with Exo's Baekhyun. The song debuted at number one on Gaon's weekly digital chart and proceeded to win the Best Collaboration award at the Mnet Asian Music Awards. She then starred in the melodrama Uncontrollably Fond with Kim Woo-bin. Bae released two OSTs for the drama, one of which she co-composed. The series was a commercial success in China and gained more than 4 billion views on Youku. In September 2016, Bae's wax figure at Madame Tussauds Hong Kong was unveiled. She is the first Korean female celebrity to receive a wax-likeness of herself at Madame Tussauds. A second wax figure of Bae also went on display at Madame Tussauds Singapore.

=== 2017–2023: Debut as a solo recording artist and acting recognition ===
In early 2017, Bae made her debut as a solo artist with the EP Yes? No?. Her pre-release single "Pretend" was released on January 17 and achieved an all-kill by topping all eight South Korean online music charts. The title track "Yes No Maybe" was released a week later, on January 24. In the same month, Dingo Studio ran a ten-episode reality show documenting Bae's everyday life called Off The Record, Suzy. In February 2017, Bae released a duet with singer Park Won, titled "Don't Wait for Your Love". She then returned to television in September 2017, starring alongside Lee Jong-suk in the fantasy romance While You Were Sleeping as a field reporter who can see the future through her dreams. On December 7, Bae released a remake of Yoo Jae-ha's "Because I Love You" for Yoo's 30th anniversary tribute album. On December 27, following the announcement of Min's departure, JYP Entertainment announced that Miss A had disbanded. Bae renewed her contract with JYP Entertainment.

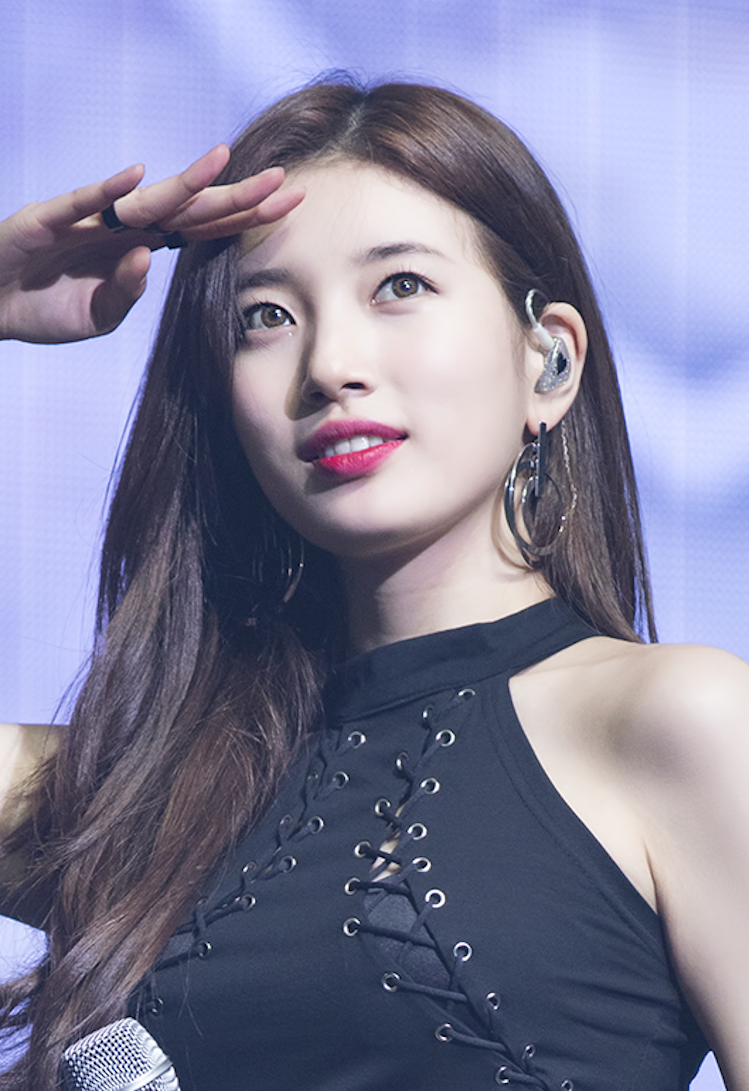
Bae performing in 2018

On January 22, 2018, Bae's pre-release single "I'm in Love with Someone Else" was released and achieved a real-time all-kill. Her second EP, Faces of Love, was released on January 29, with the title track "Holiday" featuring rapper DPR Live. On February 14, the music video for her b-side track, "SObeR", was released. On March 9, Bae released her fourth music video for the single "Midnight", featuring a piano ensemble by Yiruma. On March 31, 2019, Bae left JYP Entertainment following the expiration of her contract. She then signed a contract with acting agency Management Soop. On September 20, Bae co-wrote and featured on Babylon's single "Out of Breath". She then starred in the spy-action drama Vagabond, playing a secret agent; and disaster film Ashfall, playing Ha Jung-woo's wife. On September 4, 2020, Bae starred in the short film Live Your Strength as a woman who suddenly breaks up with her lover and finds a new beginning. The film is directed and adapted to screenplay by Kim Jee-won based on an original story written by Bae. A month later, she starred in the romantic drama Start-Up as an aspiring entrepreneur who dreams of becoming Korea's Steve Jobs.

In 2021, Bae held an online concert titled Suzy: A Tempo to commemorate her 10th debut anniversary. On February 17, 2022, she made her comeback as a singer after four years with a single titled "Satellite". Three months later, she joined musician Kang Seung-won's second album project, singing the fifth track, "Because I Love You", a ballad about shy love feelings. The same year, she starred in Coupang Play's psychological thriller Anna, playing the title role of Lee Anna/Lee Yu-mi, and was praised for her acting skills and expression of Anna's emotions by audiences and critics alike. On October 6, Bae released the digital single "Cape" and its music video. On June 12, 2023, she released "R.U.N" as the theme song for the survival reality show R U Next?. In October 2023, Bae starred in the Netflix series Doona! as the titular character, who is a retired idol having a romantic relationship with a university student portrayed by Yang Se-jong. The series is a live-action adaptation of Naver Webtoon's The Girl Downstairs by Min Song-ah.

=== 2024–present: Further acting roles ===
In 2024, Bae returned to the big screen with science-fiction film Wonderland, portraying a woman who revived her comatose boyfriend in a simulated reality. She then took part in KBS2's busking variety show Moving Voices in Germany, which aired on December 7, 2024. On February 17, 2025, Bae made her comeback as a singer after two years with the digital single "Come Back".

In March 2025, she released the Korean version of "Waiting on a Wish" for the soundtrack of the Disney fantasy film Snow White. She then starred in the Netflix series Genie, Make a Wish as an emotionless woman whose routine-bound life begins to change after meeting a genie. The series is a rom-com fantasy written by Kim Eun-sook and was released on October 3, 2025. The same month, Bae released an OST titled "A Day" for the dating reality show Exchange 4. She also starred in the novel-based film Seven O'Clock Breakfast Club for the Brokenhearted, which had its world premiere in the competition section of the 30th Busan International Film Festival. Bae has also been confirmed to star in the upcoming Disney+ series Portraits of Delusion, playing the role of a mysterious vampire.

In 2026, she voiced over an animation film, Long Long Night directed by Youm Kyu-bock. She also narrated the film, which premiered at the Centrepiece section of the 2026 Toronto International Film Festival in September.

== Public image ==
After starting her acting career, Bae became one of South Korea's hottest stars, and following the success of Architecture 101 in 2012 she was nicknamed "The Nation's First Love" (국민첫사랑; Gungmin Cheotsarang) thanks to the innocent charm of her character. Writing for magazine Ize, journalist Kim Na-ra named Bae, Im Yoon-ah and IU the most in-demand troika of all-round entertainers of the 2020s in the fields of television, film, and advertising in South Korea, identifying them as successors to Kim Tae-hee, Song Hye-kyo, and Jun Ji-hyun. Idols who have cited Bae as an influence or role model include WJSN's Bona, Oh My Girl's Arin, Jung Chae-yeon, Secret Number's Soodam, Berry Good's Johyun, GFriend's Yerin, Momoland's Nayun, and Melody Day's Yoomin.

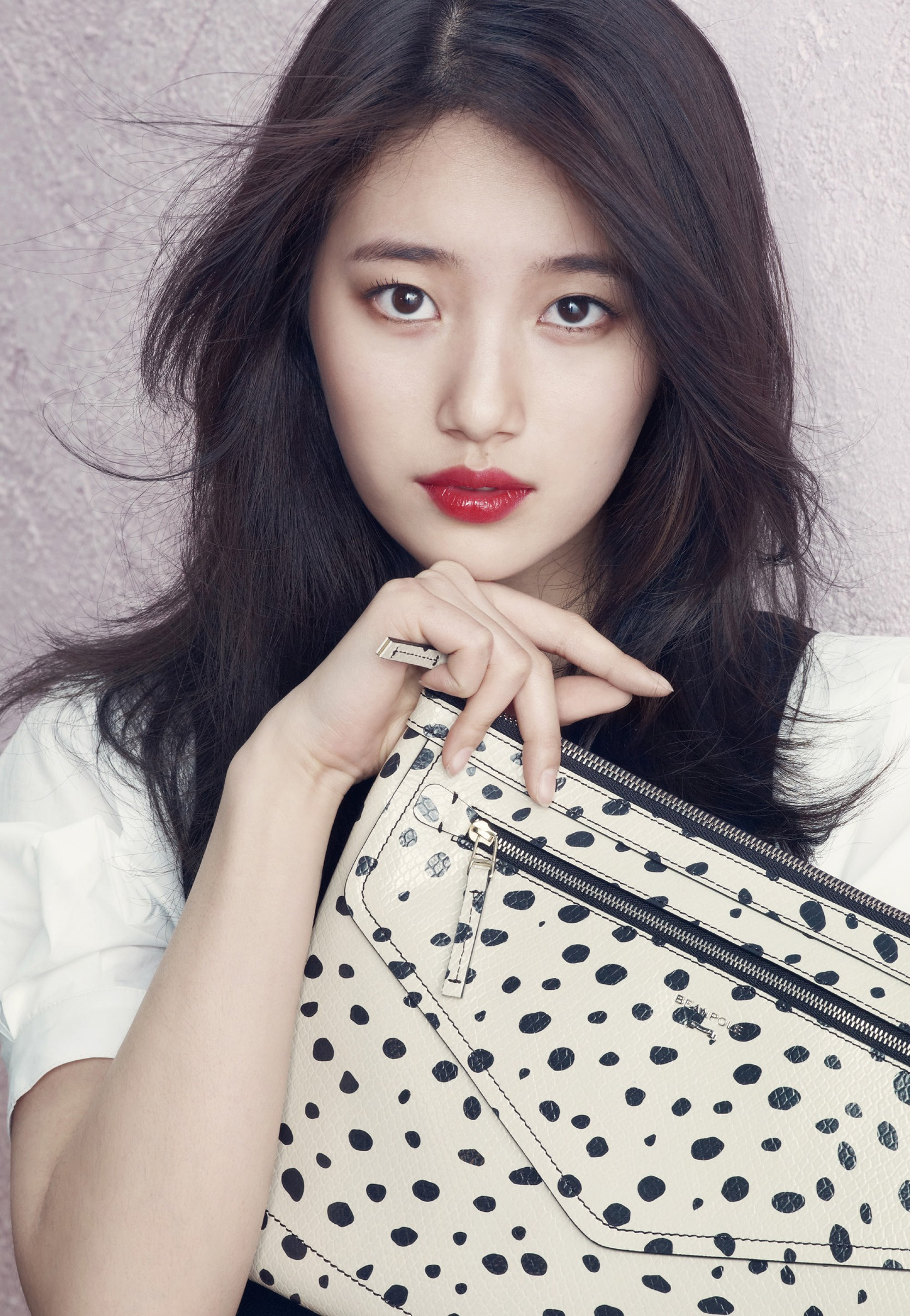
Bae for Bean Pole in 2015

Bae became one of the most in-demand endorsers in her home country, and has been hailed as a "CF Queen" due to numerous endorsement deals ranging from cosmetics, apparel, up to basic commodities like sugar. She made more than ₩10 billion in 2013 with more than 14 endorsement deals. The term "Suzy power" was coined to describe the surge in sales experienced by the companies she promoted. Some products were named after her, such as a perfume by The Face Shop, contact lenses by Clalen, a line of Guess jeans, and two lipsticks by Lancôme. In fall 2015, she designed the Bonnie Bag for Bean Pole.

In 2020, Bae was nicknamed "Human Dior" as fans noticed her always wearing and promoting the brand. In 2021, South China Morning Post estimated her net worth as US$25 million. In April 2022, she was announced as house ambassador for French luxury fashion house Dior after attending the Dior Fall 2022 show at South Korea's Ewha Womans University. In May 2022, she was the first South Korean female artist to become ambassador of elegance for Swiss luxury watch brand Longines. In 2023, she collaborated with six fashion houses to create and promote hanboks around the world through a campaign sponsored by the Ministry of Culture, Sports and Tourism together with the Korea Craft & Design Culture Promotion Agency.

== Philanthropy ==
In 2012, Bae joined Vogue Girl magazine's "Pink Wings" campaign to support children raised by grandfamilies. In 2014, reports revealed that Bae had been donating ₩10 million every year to support children with cancer and leukemia. In April, she donated ₩50 million to the victims of the Sewol ferry sinking, to be used for the relief work of the Sewol ferry missing and survivors and for the families of the victims. The same year, she registered herself for organ and tissue donation. In 2015, to celebrate Children's Day, she donated her doll collection to children in orphanage. She also donated ₩130 million to the Community Chest of Korea (Fruit of Love), joining as the 791st member of the Honor Society, a group of high-value donors. In 2019, she represented the society at a Blue House event and was acknowledged for her charitable efforts by President Moon Jae-in.

In May 2016, Bae participated in the "Let's Share the Heart" fundraising campaign and donated ₩44 million. The following month, she donated ₩10 million to the low-income families in her hometown of Gwangju. In August, she donated ₩500 million to support the welfare of preschool children. Bae has also been a consistent supporter of the Life Sharing Practice Headquarters since 2016. Through the organization, she had donated a total of ₩500 million by 2022 to support patients with incurable diseases, pediatric cancer and leukemia. Her contributions continued with donations of ₩100 million in 2021 and ₩20 million in 2024 to sponsor heart surgeries and treatments for premature infants. In addition, she has been donating ₩15 million to ₩20 million annually to provide supplies for underprivileged groups, including disabled individuals and elderly people living alone.

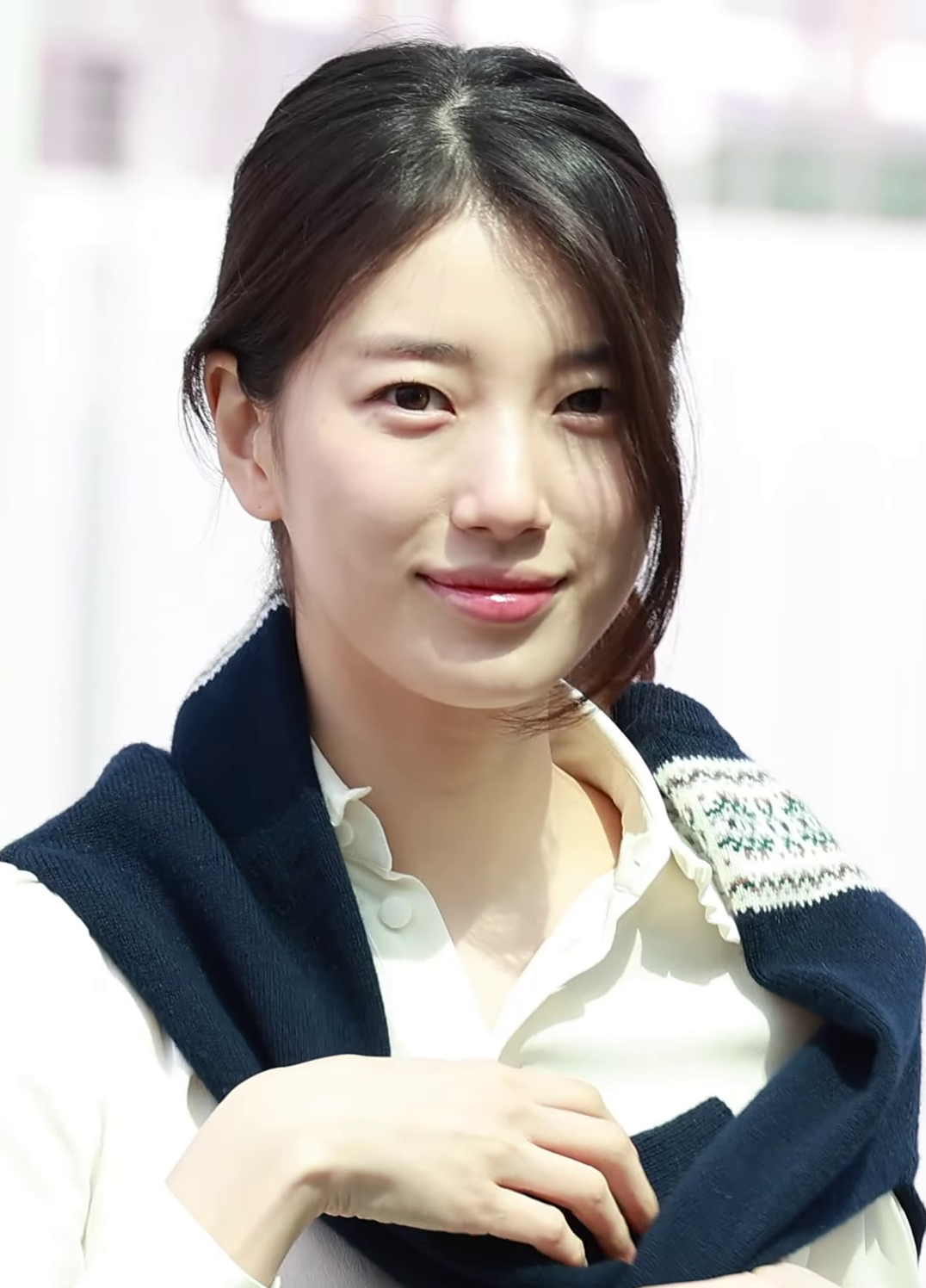
Bae in March 2025

In April 2018, Bae donated ₩20 million to Korea Single Mothers Support Network. In October 2019, she donated ₩20 million through "Our Mom" campaign to support female heads of household in need. In February 2020, Bae donated ₩100 million to Good Neighbors (International Humanitarian Development NGO) to prevent the spread of COVID-19 and support the low-income class. In May 2020, Bae worked with Lancôme to publish a beauty book and donated ₩120 million worth of sanitary pads from the sales to low-income female adolescents and single mothers. In May 2021, Bae donated ₩100 million to Happiness Sharing Association ahead of Children's Day; her donation supported children in orphanages and the livelihoods of aging out youths.

In terms of educational support, she donated ₩10 million in 2016 through Dream On Social Welfare Association in Boseong County to support middle school students in need. In 2018, she donated ₩20 million to help improve the educational environment in other countries through international relief organization World Mercy Korea. In March 2019, Bae donated ₩5 million to the Happiness Sharing Taekwondo Federation to provide uniforms for orphaned children wishing to learn taekwondo, followed by ₩50 million in 2020 to celebrate Taekwondo Day. In September, she donated ₩50 million to the "Dreams of Eunbyul" campaign to fund learning activities for children from low-income families and marginalized groups. In 2022, she promoted the "Write Her Future" campaign, which provides education programs to help female youths living in rural regions improve their digital literacy and career planning.

Bae has also made donations for disaster relief efforts. In April 2014, she donated ₩50 million to be used for the relief work of the victims and survivors of the Sewol ferry sinking, as well as their families. Since 2019, Bae has continued donating to help flood and wildfire victims through the Hope Bridge National Disaster Relief Association and was inducted into their major donors club. By 2025, her contributions to the organization had reached ₩600 million. She also donated ₩100 million to aid victims of the Turkey–Syria earthquakes through UNICEF Korea and became a member of their honors club in 2023.

Other than monetary donations, Bae also participated in charity auctions and bazaars. In 2011, a pair of autographed shoes she donated was auctioned, with the proceeds benefiting a group of young single mothers. In 2012, she joined in charity auctions again with the profits donated to Green Umbrella Children's Foundation and UNICEF's "Moms and Babies" campaign. She also donated one of her stage costumes to a charity bazaar hosted by singer Lee Hyo-ri, which aimed to help abandoned animals. In 2019 and 2020, she donated items to the WeAja charity auction, and the sales proceeds were used to support underprivileged children and communities vulnerable to the climate crisis. In 2022 and 2023, she participated in the Green Ball Campaign Bazaar, with the proceeds donated to animal shelters.

Bae's philanthropic efforts further extend to lending her voice for several charitable projects. In 2016, she narrated the barrier‑free version of the Japanese animation The Girl Who Leapt Through Time for visually impaired audiences. In 2024, she was one of the audiobook narrators for actor Moon Sang‑hoon's sound‑reading event, with all proceeds donated to support vulnerable children. In 2025, she sang the opening theme for the remake album of Dream High soundtracks, and the proceeds were donated to young adults preparing for independence. In March 2025, Suzy donated ₩100 million to support relief efforts for wildfires in the Yeongnam region, including Uiseong County in North Gyeongsang Province.

== Discography ==
=== Extended plays ===
- Yes? No? (2017)
- Faces of Love (2018)

== Filmography ==
Film

- Architecture 101 (2012)
- Ashfall (2019)
- Wonderland (2024)

Television

- Dream High (2011)
- Gu Family Book (2013)
- Uncontrollably Fond (2016)
- While You Were Sleeping (2017)
- Start-Up (2020)
- Anna (2022)
- Doona! (2023)
- Genie, Make a Wish (2025)
