= Yoo Jae-ha Music Contest =

South Korean music competition

- Genre: Music competition
- Frequency: Annually
- Location: South Korea
- Years active: 37
- Inaugurated: 1989
- Website: yjh.or.kr/about

Yoo Jae-ha Music Contest is South Korea's oldest singer-songwriter music competition, which began in 1989.

== History ==
After Yoo Jae-ha died on 1 November 1987, his family established the Yoo Jae-ha Music Scholarship Association in 1988, with proceeds from the sale of his first studio album Because I Love You. The following year, in 1989, the first contest was held by the Yoo Jae-ha Music Scholarship Association, and Cho Kyu-chan became the grand prize winner of the first competition. The competition is being held at Hanyang University's Baeknam Music Hall, Yoo Jae-ha's alma mater, and it has been held every year since 1989 until present, except in 2005, when the competition was cancelled due to financial problems.
