= Bae Suzy filmography =

List of performances by Bae Suzy

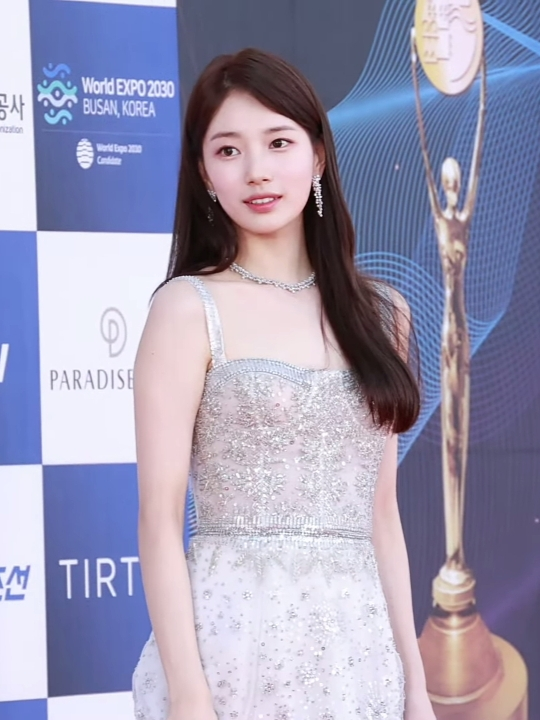
- Bae at the 2nd Blue Dragon Series Awards in July 2023
- Film: 7
- Television series: 15
- Television show: 6
- Music videos: 4

Bae Suzy (Korean: 배수지; born October 10, 1994), better known by the mononym Suzy, is a South Korean singer and actress. She was a member of the girl group Miss A under JYP Entertainment.

== Film ==
Year	Title	Role	Notes	Ref.
2012	Architecture 101	Yang Seo-yeon (young)		
2015	The Sound of a Flower	Jin Chae-seon		
2017	Real	Tattooist	Cameo	
2019	Ashfall	Choi Ji-young		
2020	Live Your Strength	Suzy	Short film	
2024	Wonderland	Gu Jeong-in		
2025	Seven O'Clock Breakfast Club for the Brokenhearted	Yoon Sa-gang		

== Television series ==
Year	Title	Role	Notes	Ref.
2011	Dream High	Go Hye-mi		
2011	Drama Special	Girlfriend	Episode: "Human Casino" (cameo)	
2012	Dream High 2	Herself	Episode 15 (cameo)	
2012	Sent from Heaven	Aspiring actress	Episode 26 (cameo)	
2012	Big	Jang Ma-ri		
2013	Gu Family Book	Dam Yeo-wool		
2014	My Love from the Star	Go Hye-mi	Episode 17 (cameo)	
2016	Uncontrollably Fond	Noh Eul		
2017	While You Were Sleeping	Nam Hong-ju		
2019	Vagabond	Go Hae-ri		
2020	Start-Up	Seo Dal-mi		
2022	Anna	Lee Yumi / Lee Anna		
2023	Doona!	Lee Doo-na		
2025	Genie, Make a Wish	Gi Ga-young		
2026	Portraits of Delusion	Madam Song Jeong-hwa		

== Television shows ==
Year	Title	Role	Notes	Ref.
2011–12	Invincible Youth 2	Cast member		
2012	Style Log: Weekly – Much Wanted Life	Narrator		
2013	Real Man	Narrator		
2014	Connection	Narrator		
2017	Off The Record, Suzy	Herself	Documentary	
2024	Moving Voices	Cast member	In Germany (Episode 6–8)	

== Hosting ==
Year	Title	Notes	Ref.
2010–11	Show! Music Core	with Park Ji-yeon, Choi Min-ho and Onew	
2011	5th Mnet 20's Choice Awards	with Song Joong-ki	
2012	21st Seoul Music Awards	with Tak Jae-hoon and Shin Hyun-joon	
2012	26th Golden Disc Awards	with Lee Hong-gi	
2012	M! Countdown One Asia Tour 'Hello Japan'	with Lee Joon	
2012	18th Korea Musical Awards	with Kim Won-jun	
2012	MBC College Musicians Festival	with Lee Juck	
2012	11th KBS Entertainment Awards	with Shin Dong-yup and Lee Ji-ae	
2012	SBS Gayo Daejeon	with IU and Jung Gyu-woon	
2013	22nd Seoul Music Awards	with Tak Jae-hoon	
2013	Korean Music Wave in Bangkok	with Nichkhun, Jo kwon, Choi Min-ho and Park Ji-yeon	
2013	8th Seoul International Drama Awards	with Lee Sung-jae	
2013	Music Bank World Tour in Istanbul	with Cho Kyu-hyun, Yoon Doo-joon and Ayşe Süberker	
2013	KBS Song Festival	with Lee Hwi-jae and Yoon Shi-yoon	
2014	MBC Infinite Dream Concert	with Lee Hanee, Sung Si-kyung, Lee Deok-hwa	
2016	52nd Baeksang Arts Awards	with Shin Dong-yup	
2017	53rd Baeksang Arts Awards	with Park Joong-hoon	
2018	54th Baeksang Arts Awards	with Shin Dong-yup and Park Bo-gum	
2019	55th Baeksang Arts Awards	with Shin Dong-yup and Park Bo-gum	
2020	56th Baeksang Arts Awards	with Shin Dong-yup and Park Bo-gum	
2021	57th Baeksang Arts Awards	with Shin Dong-yup	
2022	58th Baeksang Arts Awards	with Shin Dong-yup and Park Bo-gum	
2023	59th Baeksang Arts Awards	with Shin Dong-yup and Park Bo-gum	
2024	60th Baeksang Arts Awards	with Shin Dong-yup and Park Bo-gum	
2025	61st Baeksang Arts Awards	with Shin Dong-yup and Park Bo-gum	
2026	62nd Baeksang Arts Awards	with Shin Dong-yup and Park Bo-gum	

== Music video appearances ==
Year	Title	Artist(s)	Ref.
2011	"Pretty But Hateful"	Son Ho-young	
2018	"First Love"	Epitone Project	
2022	"Celeb"	Psy	
2025	"Stay"	Urban Zakapa	
