= Dream (Suzy and Baekhyun song) =

- Digital cover art

Single by Suzy and Baekhyun
- Released: January 7, 2016
- Recorded: 2015
- Genre: K-pop; R&B; Jazz
- Length: 3:42
- Label: JYP; SM; MYSTIC; Choongang ICS; LOEN
- Composers: Park Geun-tae; Choi Jin-suk
- Lyricist: Kim Eana
- Producers: Park Geun-tae; Choi Jin-suk

Suzy singles chronology
"Dream" (2016)	"Pretend" (2017)

Baekhyun singles chronology
"Beautiful" (2015)	"Dream" (2016)	"The Day" (2016)

"Dream" is a song recorded by South Korean singers Suzy and Baekhyun, members of K-pop groups miss A and Exo respectively. It was released digitally on January 7 and later physically on January 14, 2016 by Mystic Entertainment. Written by Kim Eana and composed by Park Geun-tae and Jin Suk Choi, the song was described as a R&B song with jazz and neo soul sounds and lyrics about a couple falling in love.

"Dream" was a commercial success, having sold over 1.3 million digital downloads. It debuted at number 1 on the Gaon Digital Chart and remained at this position for three consecutive weeks. The song received multiple accolades at major South Korean music award shows in 2016, including the Digital Bonsang at the 31st Golden Disk Awards.

== Background and release ==
On December 31, 2015, Suzy and Baekhyun were announced to be collaborating on a duet titled "Dream", described as a R&B song with jazz and neo soul sounds and lyrics about a couple falling in love. Two teaser videos for the song, the first one featuring Suzy and the second one featuring Baekhyun, were released on January 4 and 5 respectively. The song was released digitally accompanied by its music video on January 7. Physical copies were later released on January 14.

Shortly after "Dream" was released, Park Geun-tae, one of the song's composers, revealed that he had been working on the song for two years, and that it took one year to get both singers to participate in its production. He noticed Suzy in 2013 after listening to her soundtrack "Don't Forget Me" for the MBC television series Gu Family Book in which she also played the female lead, and later decided to choose Baekhyun as her duet partner.

== Music video ==
Throughout most of the music video for "Dream", Suzy and Baekhyun are seen performing the song and interacting with each other while sitting on stools in the center of a vintage styled room, surrounded by a jazz band consisting of four men playing the electric guitar, double bass, piano and drum set. There are also brief scenes where they are seen presumably preparing for a date; Suzy sitting in front of the mirror at a makeup table and Baekhyun putting on a suit jacket. The music video ends with the singers giving each other high five and a fist bump before standing up from the stools and thanking the band.

== Live performances ==
Suzy and Baekhyun performed the song together for the first time on December 2, 2016 at the 18th Mnet Asian Music Awards. On January 13, 2017, they performed the song again at the 31st Golden Disk Awards.

== Reception ==
"Dream" debuted at number one on South Korea's Gaon weekly digital chart and remained at this position for three consecutive weeks. The physical version also debuted at the same position on the Gaon weekly album chart. The song won first place five times in total on South Korean music television shows Music Bank and Inkigayo. "Dream" went on to win Best Collaboration at the 18th Mnet Asian Music Awards, Best R&B Song at the 8th Melon Music Awards, and Digital Bonsang at the 31st Golden Disk Awards.

== Track listing ==
No.	Title	Lyrics	Music	Length
1.	"Dream"	Kim Eana	Park Geun-tae; Choi Jin-suk	3:42
2.	"Dream" (Club Live Ver.)	Kim Eana	Park Geun-tae; Choi Jin-suk	3:33
Total length:				7:15

== Credits and personnel ==
- Suzy – vocals
- Baekhyun – vocals
- Park Geun-tae – producer, composer, arranger
- Choi Jin-suk – producer, composer, arranger
- Kim Eana – lyrics
- Choi In-sung – bass
- Park Eun-ooh – chorus
- Lee Seung-woo – chorus
- Hong So-jin – piano
- Jung Jae-won – recording, electric guitar
- Jo Joon-sung – mixing
- Choi Hyo-young – mastering

Credits are adapted from album liner notes.

== Charts ==
=== Weekly charts ===
Chart (2016)	Peak position
South Korea (Gaon)	1
South Korean Albums (Gaon)	1
US World Digital Songs (Billboard)	3

=== Monthly charts ===
Chart (January 2016)	Peak position
South Korea (Gaon)	1
South Korean Albums (Gaon)	4

=== Year-end charts ===
Chart (2016)	Peak position
South Korea (Gaon)	20
South Korean Albums (Gaon)	77

== Accolades ==
Awards and nominations
Year	Award	Category	Result
2016	8th Melon Music Awards	Best R&B/Soul Song	Won
2016	18th 18th Mnet Asian Music Awards	Best Collaboration	Won
2017	31st Golden Disc Awards	Digital Bonsang	Won
2017	31st Golden Disc Awards	Asian Choice Popularity Award	Won
2017	6th Gaon Chart Music Awards	Song of the Year – January	Nominated

Music program awards
Program	Date
Music Bank (KBS)	January 15, 2016
Music Bank (KBS)	January 22, 2016
Inkigayo (SBS)	January 17, 2016
Inkigayo (SBS)	January 24, 2016
Inkigayo (SBS)	January 31, 2016

== Release history ==
Region	Date	Format	Label
Various	January 7, 2016	Digital download; streaming	JYP; SM; MYSTIC; Choongang ICS; LOEN
South Korea	January 14, 2016	CD	JYP; SM; MYSTIC; Choongang ICS; LOEN
