= Faces of Love (EP) =

EP by Suzy
- Released: January 29, 2018
- Recorded: 2017
- Studios: JYP Studios, Seoul, South Korea
- Genres: K-pop; R&B; Soul
- Length: 24:35
- Language: Korean
- Labels: JYP Entertainment; IRIVER

Suzy chronology
Yes? No? (2017)	Faces of Love (2018)

Singles from Faces of Love
- 1. "I'm in Love With Someone Else" Released: January 22, 2018; 2. "Holiday" Released: January 29, 2018; 3. "Sober" Released: February 14, 2018; 4. "Midnight" Released: March 9, 2018

Faces of Love is the second extended play by South Korean singer Suzy. It was released by JYP Entertainment and distributed by IRIVER on January 29, 2018. The extended play features seven original tracks including the title track "Holiday".

== Background and release ==
On January 2, JYP Entertainment reviled that Suzy went to Los Angeles on January 1 to film her music video for her second mini album. On January 4, JYP announced that the artist will be releasing her second solo mini album on January 29 and will be dropping a pre-release track on January 22. On January 16, a prequel video of the mini album Faces of Love was released featuring Suzy showing different concepts to her tracks. The tracks titles of the mini album were unveiled on the same day along with the pre-release date of the track "I'm in Love With Someone Else". On January 17, a teaser of the pre-released track "I'm in Love With Someone Else" was released. On January 18, teaser photos of Suzy for the track "I'm in Love With Someone Else" were released. On January 19, teaser photos for the title track "Holiday" were released. On January 20, teaser photos for the track "Midnight" were released. On January 21, teaser photos for the track "SObeR" and additional teaser photos for "Midnight" were released. On January 22, "I'm in Love With Someone Else" was released along with a music video and a live video. A lyrics photo and a cover of the track were also released. On the same day, additional teaser photos of "SObeR" were released. On January 24, the first teaser of the title track "Holiday" was released. On the same day, additional photos of "I'm in Love With Someone Else" were released. On January 25, the second teaser of "Holiday" was released along with photo teasers. On January 26, the third teaser of "Holiday" was released. On the same day, the first poster of the mini album Faces of Love was released along with additional photo teasers of "Holiday". On January 28, an album spoiler video was released and other photo teasers of the mini album. On January 29, the mini album was released along with the title track "Holiday".

On February 14, Suzy released a music video for her track "SObeR".

== Promotion ==
On January 29, Suzy held a press showcase where she talked about her second mini album Faces of Love and performed some of the tracks.

Suzy started promoting the tracks "Holiday" and "SObeR" on South Korean music shows on February 2.

== Track listing ==
No.	Title	Lyrics	Music	Arrangement	Length
1.	"I'm in Love With Someone Else" (다른사람을 사랑하고 있어)	Armadillo	Armadillo	Kwon Young-chan	3:50
2.	"Holiday" (featuring DPR Live)	Jin Ri (Full8loom); DPR Live	Glory Face (Full8loom); Jin Ri (Full8loom)	Glory Face (Full8loom)	3:12
3.	"SObeR"	Suzy	Andrew Choi; EJAE; Aron Kim; Isaac Han	Aron Kim; Isaac Han; EJAE	3:08
4.	"Bxatxh" (나쁜X)	Suzy	Suzy; Shim Eun-ji	Shim Eun-ji	3:22
5.	"Midnight" (잘자 내 몫까지)	Night Sky	Night Sky	Night Sky	4:15
6.	"Clumsy Heart" (서툰 마음 (Prod. Jung Key))	Jung Key	Jung Key	Jung Key; Humbert	3:23
7.	"Sleeplessness" (너는 밤새도록)	Suzy	Locomotive	Locomotive; Jeon Ji-han	3:25
Total length:					24:35

== Charts ==
Chart (2018)	Peak position
South Korean Weekly Album Chart (Gaon)	6
South Korean Monthly Album Chart (Gaon)	30

== Sales ==
Region	Sales
South Korea (Gaon)	10,269+
