= Yoo Jae-ha =

South Korean musician (1962–1987)

Yoo Jae-ha 유재하

Background information
- Born: June 6, 1962; Andong, South Korea
- Died: November 1, 1987 (aged 25) Seoul, South Korea
- Cause of death: Car accident
- Education: Hanyang University
- Genres: Pop
- Occupations: Singer; songwriter
- Instruments: Singing; guitar; keyboard
- Years active: 1984–1987
- Labels: Seoul Records

Korean name
- Hangul: 유재하
- Hanja: 柳在夏
- RR: Yu Jaeha
- MR: Yu Chaeha

Yoo Jae-ha (Korean: 유재하; Hanja: 柳在夏; June 6, 1962 – November 1, 1987) was a South Korean singer and songwriter. His first and only album, Because I Love You (Korean: 사랑하기 때문에) was released through Seoul Records in 1987. Yoo died in a car accident months later from the album release at age 25. Even though he died with only one album, Yoo Jae-ha's music has a great legacy in South Korea, and it is credited with exerting tremendous influence in Korean popular music.

== Biography and death ==
Yoo was born in Andong, North Gyeongsang Province in South Korea. He attended Hanyang University, where he studied music composition and began playing the keyboard for Cho Yong-pil's band, The Great Birth in 1984.

After graduating from college, he worked with Kim Hyun-sik for Kim's first album Spring-Summer-Fall-Winter, and in 1986, he wrote the song "Hidden Road" (Korean: 골목길) from Kim's 3rd album, which contributed to the creation of Kim's early alum. The following year, in 1987, he released his first and only album, Because I Love You, and then died in a car accident on November 1 of the same year at the age of 25.

== Legacy ==
Following Yoo's death in 1987, his family established the Yoo Jae-ha Scholarship Foundation, followed in 1989 by the Yoo Jae-ha Music Contest. Winners of the contest include You Hee-yeol, Kim Yeon-woo, Bang Si-hyuk, and Choi Yu-ree.

As of 2011, Because I Love You has sold more than 2 million copies. The album was remastered and re-released on vinyl in 2014. In 2013, Mnet ranked Yoo at number one on their Legend 100 list of the most influential musicians in South Korean history since the 1960s. In 2018, Because I Love You was ranked the best pop album in South Korean history by a panel of music critics and music industry experts in collaboration with The Hankyoreh and Melon.

== Discography ==
=== Studio albums ===
Title	Album details	Peak chart positions	Sales
Title	Album details	KOR	Sales
Because I Love You (사랑하기 때문에)	Released: August 20, 1987; Label: Seoul Records; Formats: LP, cassette, CD	37	KOR: 2,000,000
