= Good Neighbors (organization) =

Humanitarian organization based in South Korea

Good Neighbors(굿 네이버스)
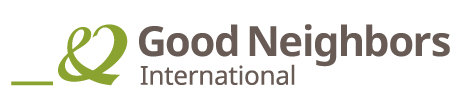
- Formation: 1991
- Headquarters: Seoul, South Korea
- Chairman: Il-ha YI
- Website: www.goodneighbors.kr

Good Neighbors is a South Korean non-profit organization and international non-governmental organization (NGO) that advocates for humanitarian aid, children's rights, and sustains the development of communities. Good Neighbors was founded in 1991 and has since expanded to over 45 countries. It works predominantly in Asia and Africa. Fundraising programs and other activities are present in the United States, Canada, Japan, and Australia. The organization is also supported by influentiel individuals, such as South Korean celebrities.

== History ==
=== Foundational context ===
Good Neighbors was founded on March 28, 1991, by Yi Il-ha along with seven members who were part of the Korea Neighborhood Love Association. The current chairman of Good Neighbors is Yang Jin-ok, who took the role in 2016 after Yi Il-ha stepped down from his position at 69 years old. The organization was established at the time when South Korea went through a political and economic transition before the International Monetary Fund (IMF) crisis of 1997.

=== Early international projects ===
The organization's first intervention was in Bangladesh in 1992. Key issues included poverty and malnutrition, as well as refugee support in Somalia in 1993 and Rwanda in 1994.

=== North Korea support ===
Good Neighbors was involved in aid to North Korea through the Sunshine Policy. This policy was established by the South Korean president Kim Dae-Jung in 1998. The policy was inspired from Germany's division and involved three principles: no armed conflicts or other aggressions, respect for independence, and peaceful cooperation among both territories of the Korean peninsula.

Good Neighbors built a bread factory in Dandong, China to supply North Korean schools because the country did not accept direct aid from South Korea. South Korea also built the Pyongyang Children's Heart Hospital in 2004. Between 1995 and 2010, the organization sent 2,054 South Koreans to visit North Korea. The main reason of these trips was to connect the two Korean governments through humanitarian diplomacy.

=== Timeline ===
Sources:

- 1991: Foundation of the NGO under the name of Korea Neighborhood Love Association.
- 1992 to 1994: International projects in Bangladesh, Somalia, and Rwanda.
- 1996: Korea's first child abuse center with consultative status through the UN ECOSOC.
- 2002: Name changed to Good Neighbors.
- 2003: Good Neighbors internationalization through the Ministry of Foreign Affairs.
- 2008-2015: Aid to disaster relief in Haiti, East Japan, and Nepal earthquakes.
- 2014-2018: Tanzania projects implementation of water, school, and life conditions solutions.
- 2014-2017: Projects in Bangladesh about women's empowerment.
- 2019: Development across 45 countries and constant worldwide participation.

== Mission and development approach ==
=== Mission ===
Good Neighbors protects and promotes the rights of children by reducing poverty and supporting vulnerable individuals through education and health programs. The goal of this NGO is connected to the United Nations Convention on the Rights of the Child (UN CRC) and the United Nations Sustainable Development Goals (SDGs).

Majority of the Good Neighbors' programs address poverty, child protection, education, access to clean water, disaster relief, helping families and marginalized groups such as women, elderly, and people with disabilities.

This South Korean NGO has partnership with important institutions such as the World Food Programme (WFP), World Health Organization (WHO), and United Nations High Commissioner for Refugees (UNHCR). Good Neighbors focuses on community improvements through collaborative projects. According to its 2019 Annual Report, Good Neighbors had 3,567 people subscribed as staff members, 89,763 volunteers, and 465,999 community partners around the world.

=== Development approach ===
Good Neighbors NGO was inspired by a South Korean movement in the 1970s which focused on empowerment, participation, and infrastructure development. The main goal is to ensure social changes and opportunity access among children, gender, and marginalized communities.

Good Neighbors' principles involve cooperative work among communities, which automatically push individuals to not rely on external aid, but improve conditions to develop local income that will be sustainable long-term.

== Saemaul Undong Movement ==
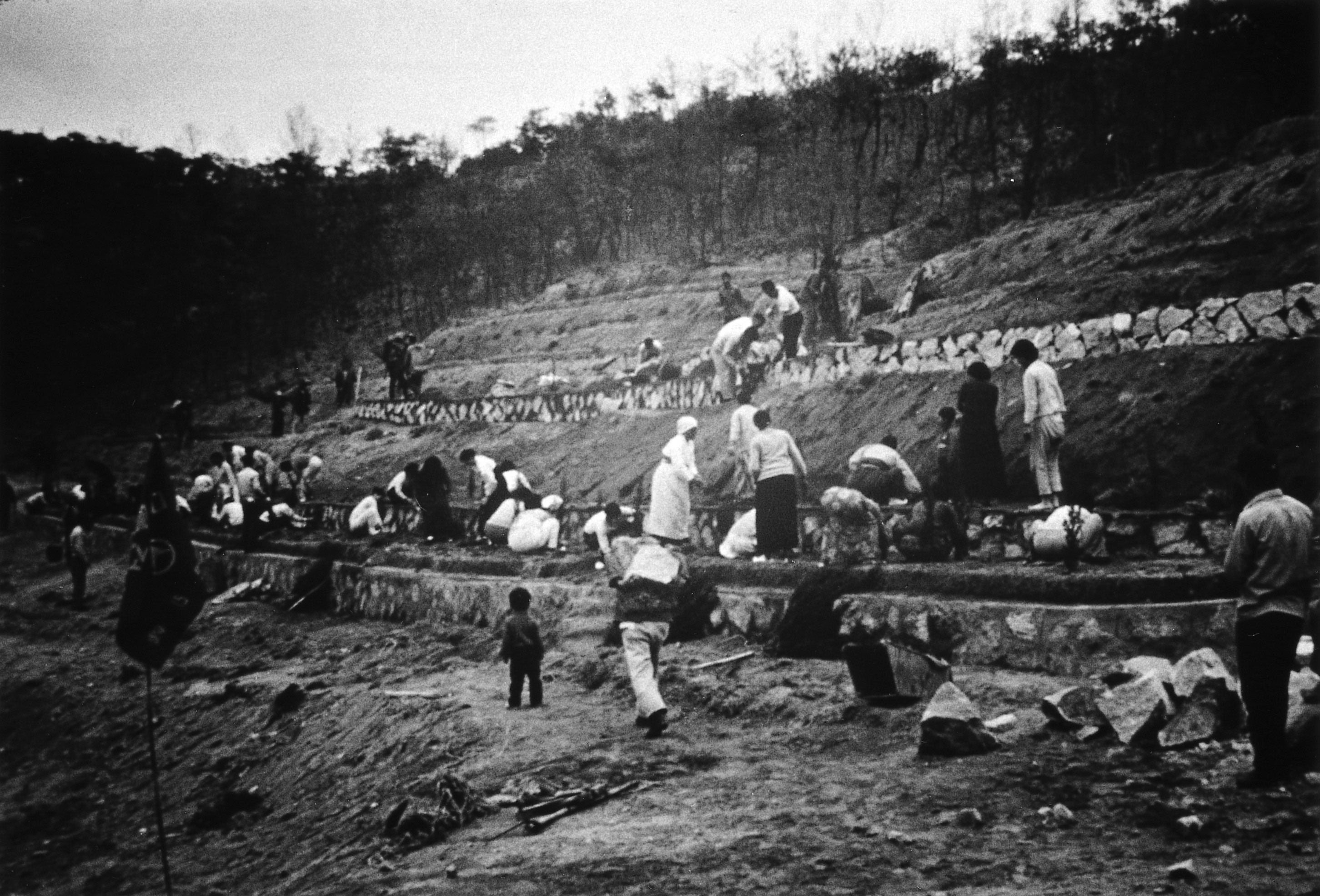
Forest Land Improvement during Saemaul Undong Movement in 1973.

Good Neighbors took the South Korean model of Saemaul Undong (새마을 운동), which translates to "New Community Movement". This model consists of rural development of communities that began in the 1970s. It was initiatives linked with cooperation, self-help and diligence that made communities participate and be involved in changing their living conditions.

The goal of this movement was to reduce inequalities between urban and rural communities. Saemaul Undong was about infrastructure development, income increase, and better organization of the population. Most of the villages had basic resources and had to start working on the modifications of their environments. Some of the improvements in these cities involved the development of roads, water systems, and housing. This strategy became a solution to reduce poverty and allowed citizens better life quality, and it has spread through other Asian and African countries.

== Child Rights Protection (CRC) ==
Another program that inspired Good Neighbors is the United Nations Convention on the Rights of the Child, adopted in 1989 to prioritize children's rights in terms of civil, political, economic, social, and cultural rights.

In the Convention, children are defined as individuals aged under 18 with their own rights. This United Nations Convention includes 54 articles that advocates for the well-being of children through educational access, healthcare, violent protection, and even engagement in decision-making situations.

The implementation of the Convention contains principles for Child Rights Protection (CRC):

- Non-discrimination
- Child interests focus
- Right to life, survival, and development
- Child respect

These principles are followed by Good Neighbors. Children can always develop while living under safe and supportive conditions where they can take actions about their lives without having to worry about consequences.

== Food Security with World Food Programme ==
Good Neighbors is an organization that considers poverty as an obstacle for people to live in equity and have access to food. This is one of the reasons they work close with the World Food Programme (WFP). Through the programme's support, Good Neighbors has focused on food security and the reduction of malnutrition. Activities are combined with development of infrastructures, so the communities can become less independent from these humanitarian organizations. For example, in Tanzania and Bangladesh, the Saemaul projects were used to pursue the construction of water systems, schools and other buildings. Another activity developed for these communities was agriculture, so they could self-sufficient themselves because the development of these projects only target audiences in need, so these can learn to be autonomous.

== United Nations Economic and Social Council ==
Good Neighbors is recognized by the United Nations system while also gaining a consultative status with the United Nations Economic and Social Council (ECOSOC). This status allows the organization to become more active in discussions to improve humanitarian aid and the spread of human rights allowing a political position where discussions occur freely.

According to the 2019 Good Neighbors Annual Report, there were 342,368 beneficiaries from emergency relief, humanitarian assistance, reconstruction, and risk reduction projects . The socioeconomic challenges in the 1990s led to the development of South Korean organization to improve the citizens's situation.

== Activities and programs ==
According to the 2014 Annual Report of Good Neighbors in the projects occurred with the help of almost 2 million of participants. The areas prioritized were education, health, water and sanitation and income generation. Some of the organization projects have been used in rural communities based in Tanzania, Bangladesh, Chile, and Haiti. These programs are mostly based on field research while integrating humanitarian strategies to respond to citizens needs.

=== Education ===
The predominant sector for Good Neighbors work is education. Most people helped are children to increase literacy rates and access to scholarships. Many school constructions occurred in Bangladesh, Tanzania, Cambodia, and North Korea. North Korean support was shown through childcare centers and schools involving 4,700 children among 14 centers in the early 2000s and 9 between 2004 and 2010. Initiatives among young children have contributed to reduce school dropout rates among groups coming from disadvantaged backgrounds.

In Africa, school projects are connected to the concept of hope. This connection allows motivation and development of educational programs seeking the increase of basic education improvement. The project was developed in Africa in Nigeria, South Sudan, Rwanda, Zambia, Chad, Ethiopia, Kenya, Tanzania, and Malawi, establishing a total of 36 Hope Schools. In these schools, 26,512 students were benefitted by these constructions.

=== Water ===
Good Neighbors also focuses on solving clean water issues. For example, communities in Bangladesh have projects for environment, infrastructure, and disaster solution. A field study stated that clean water access has benefited health and reduced responsibility among children while also reducing risks of illness among poor communities. In Bangladesh, infrastructure projects have allowed financial support for households living under poverty conditions. In Tanzania, there has been farming and beekeeping which has also helped in the life quality. These programs have led to income increase and food improvement according to research.

=== Health ===
One of the main factors that also affects health is medical checkup because it does not allow to track vaccination or get medical facilities. Aside malnutrition, mosquitoes are another reason of illness spread.

=== Income generation ===
Good Neighbors create strategies that benefits groups to stop living in poverty conditions. Statistics show that 13,054 of households participate in agriculture programs and it has increased the creation of 6,546 small businesses.

=== Disaster relief ===
Good Neighbors has assisted in disaster relief in Haiti, Chile, Nepal, and Japan. Most of the aid comes from food distribution, medical supplies, temporary shelters, rebuilding efforts and addressing issues fast.

== Regional operations ==
Good Neighbors is present in Africa and Asia. Most of the time, the range of development and humanitarian programs involve school, water, and food access. In Africa, projects in Tanzania and Rwanda reached around 12,000 people. In Asia, children protection is highlighted in Bangladesh, Nepal, Cambodia, and North Korea, mostly when it involves single female households. Despite being less heard in the Americas and the Middle East, it was part of the Chile and Dubai humanitarian aid. Good Neighbors covers needs while adapting to the contexts of each territory where the help is needed. The variations depend on population size, economic conditions, and environmental challenges.

== Reviews of campaigns and fundraising by continent ==
=== Korea ===
Campaigns occur each year. The Good Water Project helped on the distribution of accessible drinking water for citizens suffering from shortages across the world. Mother Only for a Day was created to solve the issue of high mortality among children and pregnancy risks of African women. The campaign was spread through media: television, radio, phones spreading awareness of African communities' hardships. Hopeful Heart was a project focused on Korea to help families in poverty. For this campaign, 7,876 people were donors, supplying resources for 79 schools and around 400 households. The distribution of help was done through a radio program selection.

=== USA ===
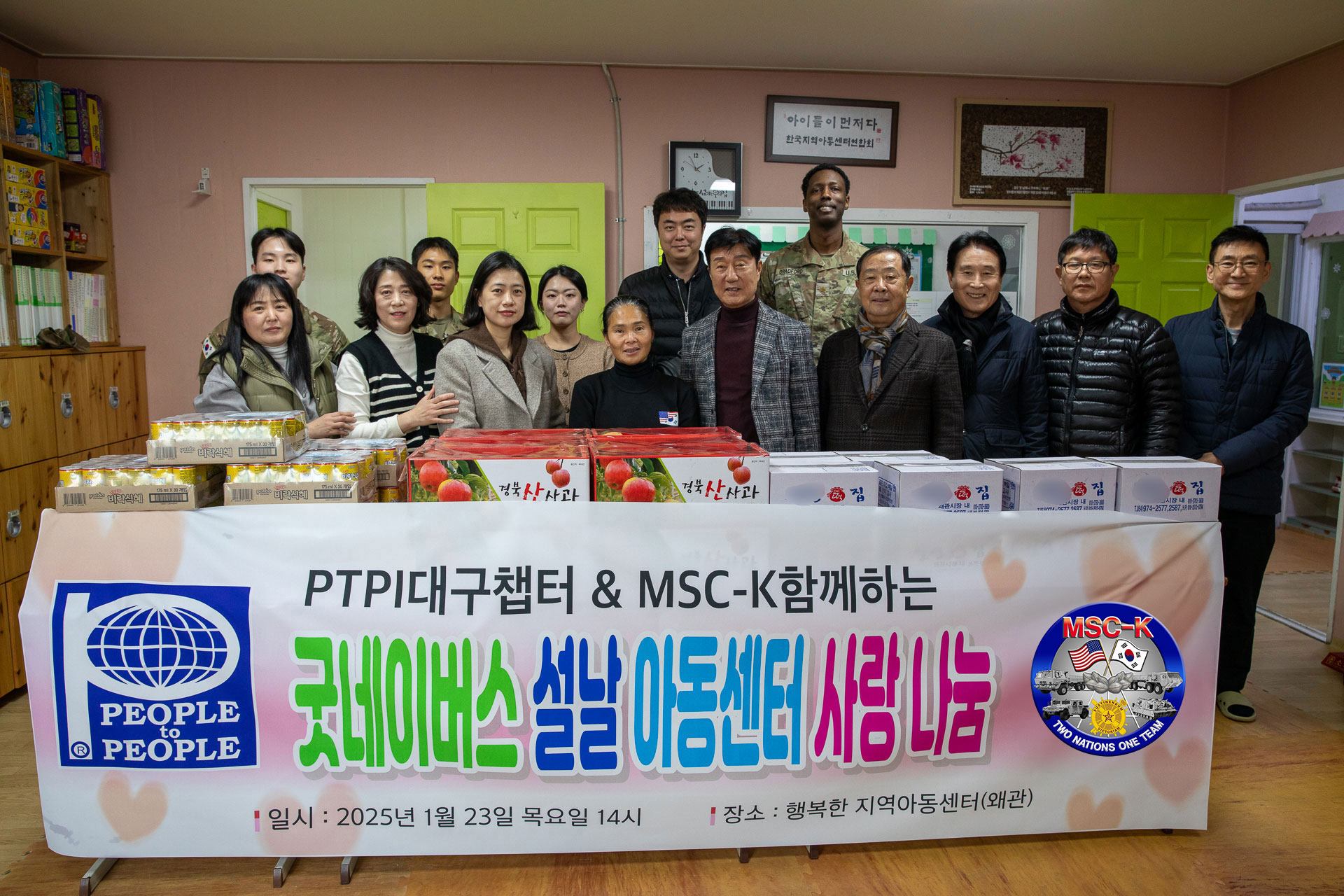
U.S. support to Good Neighbors in South Korea.

Good Neighbors USA provided support for Malawi, Ethiopia and Zambia for water access.

Three projects were developed in 2014:

The Coffee Meets Water campaign fundraised for water repair. Good Neighbors worked with coffee roasters from Los Angeles and Let It Flow to help African countries with water sanitation projects.

The High School Club includes different events to spread support for Water for Life. These events include activities such as bake sales, helping to spread a sense of taking action to help citizens in need. ASICS LA Marathon occurred on March 9, 2014 with 10 runners participating to raise funds for cookstoves in Guatemala.

=== Japan ===
In 2014, Japan had its 10th anniversary with Good Neighbors. A ceremony took place in November where members of Ethiopia were invited to celebrate.

Throughout this year different campaign events occurred: 10 Tons of Old Clothes for clothing donation which was a collaboration with a Japanese recycling company. People would send clothing directly to Good Neighbors. The 2014 report shows that 2,555 kg of clothing was collected and these pieces of clothing were sent to Indonesia, Philippines and Chile. Finally, the Hope Letter Contest was held during the summer and many children wrote letters to raise awareness. The letters who received the most votes were sent from Japan to Bangladesh.

== Partnerships and recognition ==
Good Neighbors holds partnerships with other international organizations and governments: United Nations agencies such as the WFP, WHO and UNHCR, and local governments of the countries being benefited.

Primary education allowed the recognition of Good Neighbors through the Millennium Development Goals Award (MDGs Award). Good Neighbors is also promoted by famous South Koreans who are chosen as honorary ambassadors. These selections occur to raise awareness and advocate for global initiatives' support.

In 1996, South Korea's first NGO was granted comprehensive consultation status by the United Nations Economic and Social Council(UN ECOSOC). On August 1, 2002, the organization was renamed Good Neighbors, and in August 2003, Good Neighbors International was registered with the South Korean Ministry of Foreign Affairs. Since then, emergency relief has been provided for disasters such as the Sichuan earthquake, Haiti earthquake, East Japan earthquake, and Nepal earthquake. In 2007, the group was awarded the Millennium Development Goals Award, organized by the United Nations and the International Union of Labor and Management Organizations, for his contribution to universal primary education.

== Humanitarian diplomacy ==
Good Neighbors is referred to as a mediator between governments and communities. In fact, it is valuable in the Korean Peninsula due to the remaining political tensions between both Koreas. The support from the Sunshine Policy allowed its to be active in North Korean projects. Diplomacy was sought through the maintenance engagement with the Dandong bread factory and Pyongyang's hospital development.

== Good Neighbors Canada ==
The Canadian Good Neighbors organization was registered by Canada Revenue Agency in 2023. It started in Scarborough and it is now located in Markham. The Canadian mission focuses on children's educational access and girls' empowerment. Canada has focused on maternal issues in Cameroon and on helping with the emergency relief floods in Mozambique. In 2024-2025 initiatives include support for Myanmar and Ukraine as well as the program Better Life for Girls to reduce gender restrictions.

== Activities ==
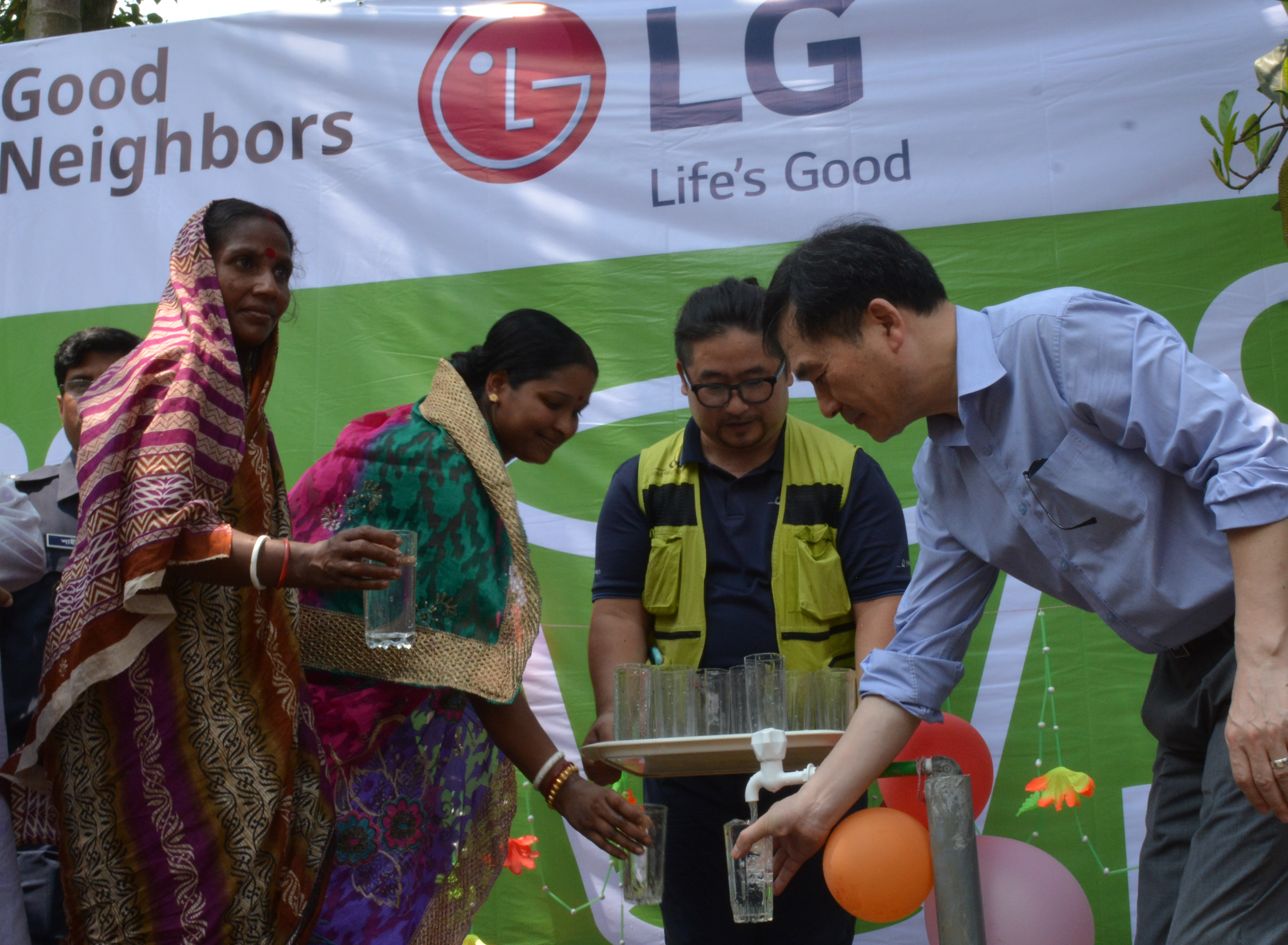
Good Neighbors, which operates 'WASH' business in Bangladesh with LG Electronics

Good Neighbors is currently carrying out international development projects in South Korea, North Korea, and 39 countries abroad. And eight developed countries, including the United States, Canada, Japan, Australia, and Taiwan, are expanding their fundraising activities and children's rights advocacy activities. Based on the United Nations Convention on the Rights of the Child(UN CRC) and the United Nations Sustainable Development Goals(UN SDGs), it targets 5.8 million children and local residents in areas such as children's rights protection, education, health, drinking water sanitation, income increase, union activities, networks, disaster relief and humanitarian support, social economic projects, and sustainable environments.

== Criticism ==
Good Neighbors has been accused of using volunteer work as a disguise for missionary work, a charge that the organization has denied.

In 2015, Good Neighbors was one of 26 charities found to have low transparency in its financial reporting, in a review of 45 large charities operating in South Korea by the media outlet Hankook Ilbo on the eve of tax law changes designed to force greater transparency in how charitable organizations spend their funds. In 2017, Good Neighbors received a 100% score in a similar transparency evaluation conducted by Yonhap News.

== Honorary ambassador ==
The following celebrities in South Korea act as ambassadors for Good Neighbors: Choi Soo-jong, Kim Jong-seok, Byun Jung-soo, Lee Se-joon, Jo Su-ah, Soriel Jang Hyuk-jae, Kim Byung-man, Kim Hyun-joo, Kim Soo-jin, Seo Young-hee, Jeon Jeong-hyang, Jin Se-yeon, Kim Ji-woo, Rayman Kim, Ham Chun-ho, Yun Sung-bin, Lee Jung-min and Go A-ra.

== See also ==
- World Vision
