= List of awards and nominations received by Miss A =

Miss A awards and nominations
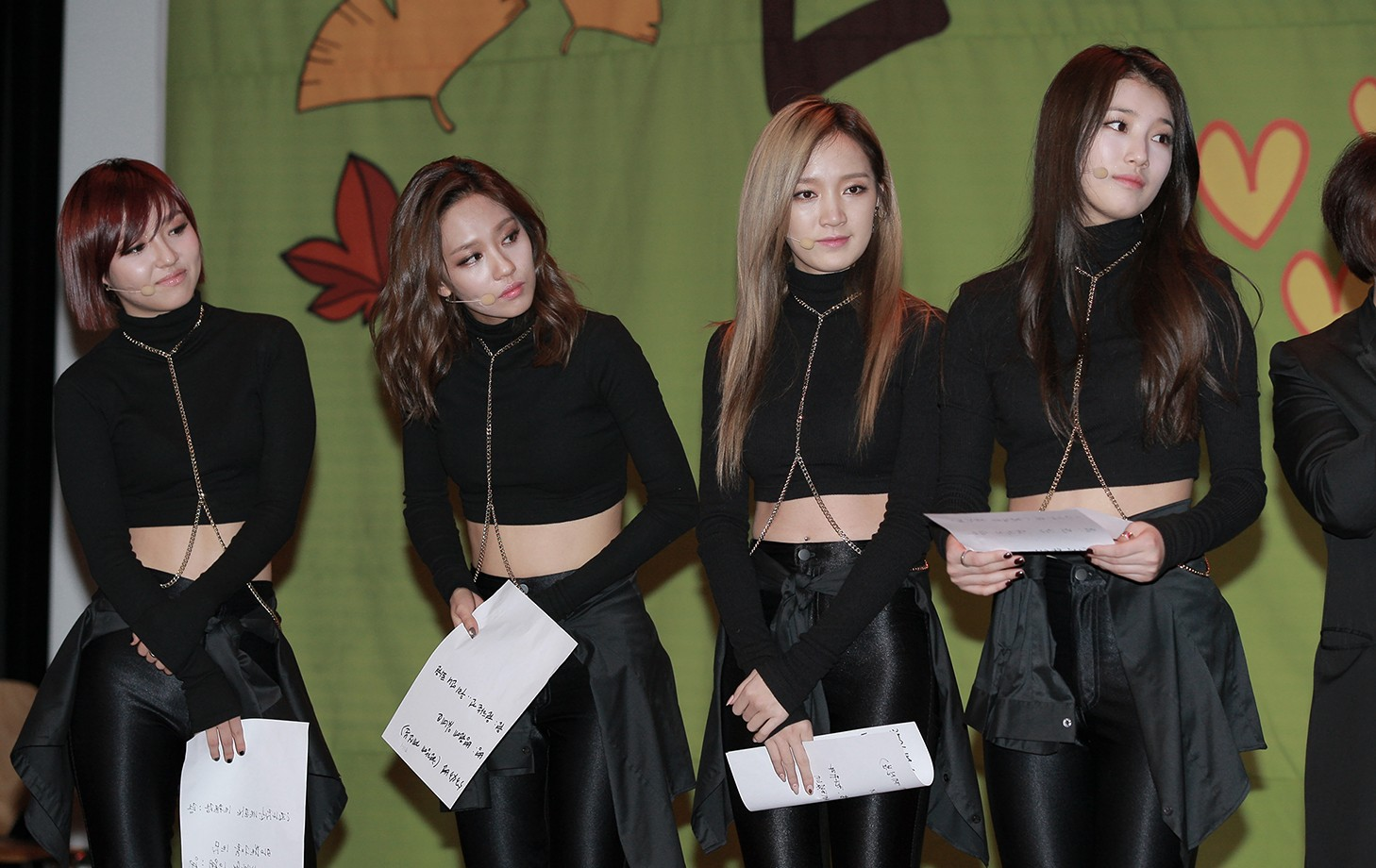
- Miss A at Severance Hospital, December 5, 2013.
Awards and nominations
Award	Wins	Nominations
Asia Song Festival	1	1
China CETV Asia Teen Star Ceremony	1	1
Cyworld Digital Music Awards	2	2
Gaon Chart Music Awards	2	3
Golden Disc Awards	3	15
KOMCA Music Awards	1	1
Korean Music Awards	1	3
Melon Music Awards	1	10
Mnet 20's Choice Awards	0	1
Mnet Asian Music Awards	4	12
Nate Year End Awards	1	1
SBS MTV Best of the Best	0	4
Seoul Music Awards	3	9
Singapore Entertainment Awards	0	1

Totals (Note: Certain award groups do not simply award one winner. They acknowledge several different recipients, have runners-up, and have third place. Since this is a specific recognition and is different from losing an award, runner-up mentions are considered wins in this award tally. For simplification and to avoid errors, each award in this list has been presumed to have had a prior nomination.)
- Wins: 20
- Nominations: 64

The following are the list of awards and nominations received by the South Korean girl group Miss A. The group gathered 20 awards over 64 nominations.

== Awards and nominations ==
Name of the award ceremony, year presented, category, nominee(s) of the award, and the result of the nomination
Award ceremony	Year	Category	Nominee / work	Result	Ref.
Asia Song Festival	2011	Best New Asian Artist	Miss A	Won	
China CETV Asia Teen Star Ceremony	2011	Best Rookie Award	Miss A	Won	
Cyworld Digital Music Awards	2010	Rookie of the Month (July)	"Bad Girl Good Girl"	Won	
Cyworld Digital Music Awards	2010	Song of the Month (July)	"Bad Girl Good Girl"	Won	
Gaon Chart Music Awards	2013	Song of the Month (November)	"Hush"	Won	
Gaon Chart Music Awards	2015	Artist of the Year (Song) (April)	"Only You"	Won	
Gaon Chart Music Awards	2015	Popularity Award	Miss A	Nominated	
Golden Disc Awards	2010	Digital Music Bonsang	"Bad Girl Good Girl"	Won	
Golden Disc Awards	2010	Best New Artist	Miss A	Nominated	
Golden Disc Awards	2010	Popularity Award	Miss A	Nominated	
Golden Disc Awards	2010	Asia Popularity Award	Miss A	Nominated	
Golden Disc Awards	2011	Disc Album Bonsang	A Class	Nominated	
Golden Disc Awards	2011	Digital Daesang of the Year	"Goodbye Baby"	Nominated	
Golden Disc Awards	2011	Digital Bonsang	"Goodbye Baby"	Won	
Golden Disc Awards	2011	Popularity Award	Miss A	Nominated	
Golden Disc Awards	2012	Digital Bonsang	"Touch"	Won	
Golden Disc Awards	2012	Popularity Award	"Touch"	Nominated	
Golden Disc Awards	2012	MSN International Award	"Touch"	Nominated	
Golden Disc Awards	2012	MSN Southeast Asian Award	"Touch"	Nominated	
Golden Disc Awards	2013	Digital Bonsang	"Hush"	Nominated	
Golden Disc Awards	2016	Digital Bonsang	"Only You"	Nominated	
Golden Disc Awards	2016	Popularity Award	Miss A	Nominated	
KOMCA Music Awards	2011	Dance Award	"Bad Girl Good Girl"	Won	
Korean Music Awards	2011	Best Dance & Electronic Song	"Bad Girl Good Girl"	Won	
Korean Music Awards	2011	Song of the Year	"Bad Girl Good Girl"	Nominated	
Korean Music Awards	2011	Group Musician of the Year	Miss A	Nominated	
Melon Music Awards	2010	Best Music Video Award	"Bad Girl Good Girl"	Nominated	
Melon Music Awards	2010	Song of the Year	"Bad Girl Good Girl"	Nominated	
Melon Music Awards	2010	Best New Artist Award	Miss A	Nominated	
Melon Music Awards	2010	MBC Music Star Award	Miss A	Won	
Melon Music Awards	2010	Hot Trend Song Award	"Breathe"	Nominated	
Melon Music Awards	2011	Top 10 Artists	Miss A	Nominated	
Melon Music Awards	2012	Global Star Award	Miss A	Nominated	
Melon Music Awards	2015	Top 10 Artists	Miss A	Nominated	
Melon Music Awards	2015	Song of the Year	"Only You"	Nominated	
Melon Music Awards	2015	Best Dance Song	"Only You"	Nominated	
Mnet 20's Choice Awards	2012	20's Trendy Music	"Touch"	Nominated	
Mnet Asian Music Awards	2010	Song of the Year	"Bad Girl Good Girl"	Won	
Mnet Asian Music Awards	2010	Best Dance Performance – Female Group	"Bad Girl Good Girl"	Won	
Mnet Asian Music Awards	2010	Artist of the Year	Miss A	Nominated	
Mnet Asian Music Awards	2010	Best New Female Artist	Miss A	Won	
Mnet Asian Music Awards	2011	Song of the Year	"Goodbye Baby"	Nominated	
Mnet Asian Music Awards	2011	Best Dance Performance – Female Group	"Goodbye Baby"	Won	
Mnet Asian Music Awards	2012	Song of the Year	"Touch"	Nominated	
Mnet Asian Music Awards	2012	Best Dance Performance – Female Group	"Touch"	Nominated	
Mnet Asian Music Awards	2014	Best Dance Performance Female Group	"Hush"	Nominated	
Mnet Asian Music Awards	2014	Song of the Year	"Hush"	Nominated	
Mnet Asian Music Awards	2015	Best Female Group	Miss A	Nominated	
Mnet Asian Music Awards	2015	UnionPay Artist of the Year	Miss A	Nominated	
Nate Year End Awards	2013	Best Female Group	Miss A	Won	
SBS MTV Best of the Best	2011	Best Music Video Female	"Goodbye Baby"	Nominated	
SBS MTV Best of the Best	2012	Best Music Video Female	"I Don't Need A Man"	Nominated	
SBS MTV Best of the Best	2012	Best Rival (Live)	Miss A vs Sistar	Nominated	
SBS MTV Best of the Best	2013	Best Female Group	Miss A	Nominated	
Seoul Music Awards	2010	Best New Artist	Miss A	Nominated	
Seoul Music Awards	2010	Bonsang Award	"Bad Girl Good Girl"	Won	
Seoul Music Awards	2011	Bonsang Award	"Goodbye Baby"	Won	
Seoul Music Awards	2012	Bonsang Award	Touch	Won	
Seoul Music Awards	2013	Bonsang Award	Hush	Nominated	
Seoul Music Awards	2013	Popularity Award	Hush	Nominated	
Seoul Music Awards	2016	Bonsang Award	Colors	Nominated	
Seoul Music Awards	2016	Popularity Award	Miss A	Nominated	
Seoul Music Awards	2016	Hallyu Special Award	Miss A	Nominated	
Singapore Entertainment Awards	2012	Most Popular Korean Artist	Miss A	Nominated	

== Listicles ==
Name of publisher, year listed, name of listicle, and placement
Publisher	Year	Listicle	Placement	Ref.
Forbes	2013	Korea Power Celebrity	17th	
