= Yes? No? =

EP by Suzy
- Released: January 24, 2017
- Recorded: 2016
- Studio: JYP Studios, Seoul, South Korea
- Genre: R&B; Soul
- Language: Korean
- Label: JYP Entertainment; KT Music

Suzy chronology
Yes? No? (2017)	Faces of Love (2018)

Singles from Yes? No?
- 1. "Pretend" Released: January 17, 2017; 2. "Yes No Maybe" Released: January 24, 2017

Yes? No? is the debut extended play by South Korean singer Suzy. It was released by JYP Entertainment on January 24, 2017. The extended play features six original tracks.

== Background and release ==
On December 2, 2016, Suzy was announced to be debuting as a solo singer in January 2017, becoming the second Miss A member to have released a solo album, after Fei. On January 10, JYP producer Park Jin-young was reported to have written the album's title track. On January 24, the album was officially released.

== Track listing ==
No.	Title	Lyrics	Music	Arrangement	Length
1.	"Pretend" (행복한 척; Haengbokhan Cheok)	Armadillo	Armadillo	Armadillo	3:41
2.	"Yes No Maybe"	J.Y. Park "The Asiansoul"	J.Y. Park "The Asiansoul"; Kairos	J.Y. Park "The Asiansoul"; Kim Seung-soo	3:06
3.	"Sick and Tired (feat. Reddy)" (다 그런거잖아; Da Geureongeo Janha)	Kim Won; G.Soul	Kim Won; G.Soul	Kim Won	3:39
4.	"Preference (Les Préférences)" (취향; Chwihyang)	Suzy	1Piece	1Piece	4:28
5.	"Question Mark" (난로 마냥; Nanro Manyang)	Suzy	Suzy; Jo Hyun-ah	Shim Eunjee	4:02
6.	"Little Wildflower" (꽃마리; Kkochmari)	Epitone Project	Epitone Project	Epitone Project	4:04
Total length:					23:00

== Charts ==
=== Weekly charts ===
Chart (2017)	Peak position
South Korean Weekly Album Chart (Gaon)	2
US World Albums (Billboard)	15

=== Monthly charts ===
Chart (2017)	Peak position
South Korean Monthly Album Chart (Gaon)	14

== Sales ==
Region	Sales
South Korea (Gaon)	11,020

== Awards and nominations ==
=== Music program awards ===
Song	Program	Date
"Pretend"	Music Bank (KBS)	January 27, 2017
"Pretend"	Music Bank (KBS)	February 3, 2017

== Release history ==
Region	Date	Format	Label
Worldwide	January 24, 2017	Digital download	JYP Entertainment
South Korea	January 24, 2017	Digital download; CD	JYP Entertainment; KT Music
