= Because I Love You (album) =

1987 studio album by Yoo Jae-ha

- 1987 LP cover

Studio album by Yoo Jae-ha
- Released: August 20, 1987
- Recorded: December 1986 – March 1987
- Studios: Seoul Studio (Ichon-dong, Seoul)
- Length: 47:22 (2014 remastering)
- Label: Seoul Records
- Producer: Yoo Jae-ha

Because I Love You (Korean: 사랑하기 때문에; RR: Saranghagi ttaemune) is the only studio album by South Korean singer and songwriter Yoo Jae-ha, released on August 20, 1987, by Seoul Records, three months before the singer's sudden death.

Considered one of the best South Korean pop albums of all time and the first one where a singer wrote, composed, and arranged the songs all by himself, it influenced the music of subsequent generations, starting the evolution of Korean ballads.

== Background ==
Yoo Jae-ha decided to pursue a solo career in the winter of 1986, at the age of 24, and turned to Kim Hyun-sik's bassist Jo Won-ik for help, presenting him a detailed project of the entire album, with the lyrics, composition and instrumentation of each track already complete. The songs were recorded at Seoul Studio in Ichon-dong between December 1986 and March 1987, and Yoo personally paid ₩8 million for the recording studio and played all the instruments himself.

== Production and composition ==
In composing the songs, Yoo resorted to modulation, a technique hardly used at the time, and tried to mix a variety of musical instruments such as flute, violin, oboe and cello, not just drums, guitar, bass and keyboard. The lyrics were inspired by his personal life and by a flautist, Kim Mo-seong, whom he dated for four years. Apart from "Minuet", a lively instrumental piece played by violin, viola and cello, all others are sung.

"Our Love" and "You In My Arms" express the ecstasy of love with comparisons reminiscent of fairy tales: the first one opens with a cheerful atmosphere and sings of a love as warm and lively as spring, but also reflects the loneliness in his voice. Natural elements such as the sun, moon, birds and flowers are personified, and either bless the lovers or are jealous of their love. The second song is a love confession that expresses the narrator's intense desire to become one with his lover, rendered through lyrical metaphors that recall a romantic and dreamy fantasy world. According to the singer's brother, it was written by Yoo at about 20–21 years old.

In the next four songs Yoo sings about break up and parting: "Empty Tonight" expresses the narrator's confusion and immobility in the face of an unexpected breakup, while "My Image Reflected in My Heart" finds him reflecting on himself during the subsequent period of suffering. The State Committee for Morality proposed to change the title to "Your Image Reflected in My Heart" (내 마음에 비친 네 모습), but Yoo insisted on the original title as adhering to the meaning of the song. "Hidden Road" is a prayer to his lover to show him the way so that he can stop wandering, and first appeared in Kim Hyun-sik's third album in 1986. In "Past Days" Yoo recalls the past after some time, resigned but still hopeful because he did his best, anticipating the couple's reunion narrated in the last two songs.

"Gloomy Letter", which is based on the first letter Yoo received after two years of unsuccessful courtship, is divided into two parts: in the first the singer, who has met his lover again and is parting with her after the reunion, receives a letter from her and read it on returning home, while in the second he answers her and asks her to believe in them again if she still loves him. "Because I Love You" was written by Yoo when he was around 22-23 and was first released in 1985 on Cho Yong-pil's seventh album, but like "Hidden Road", Yoo decided to re-sing it and release it under his own name because his musical style was different. Through the lyrics, the narrator confesses that he fell in love at first sight and that he has never been able to forget his love, realizing that he belongs completely to his lover: he therefore promises her complete obedience and to try harder.

The album ends with "Song of Purity", a patriotic song requested by the State Committee for Morality that was removed in subsequent editions, starting with the 1987 cassette.

== Release and commercial reception ==
Because I Love You was released on August 20, 1987, on vinyl under Seoul Records, with a plain white background and the title letters formed from cigarette smoke on the cover.

The album received little media attention due to the anachronistic musical style and vocal technique, which were considered strange. The syncopation at the beginning of the songs caused the television producers to deem Yoo unable to follow the beat, and as a result his only small screen appearance was on KBS variety show Youth March with a performance of "My Image Reflected in My Heart". The singer also presented "Past Days" at the Yamada Music Festival in Japan, where it was eliminated in the preliminary round.

Although initial sales were far below expectations, with the author's posthumous popularity Because I Love You ballooned to nearly 1.5 million copies sold in 1997 and surpassed two million in 2011. The 2014 reissue ranked #37 on the Gaon Weekly Album Chart.

== Critical reception ==
In 1987, critics found the use of complex harmonies and counterpoint melodies strange; however, the singer's sudden death a few months later led to a re-evaluation of Because I Love You. Over time, the record has become a classic, influencing the music of subsequent generations – also thanks to the music contest in his name established in 1989 – and earning Yoo the title of "father of Korean ballads". First album to assimilate varied and difficult harmonies into pop ballads, the genre's evolution is believed to have started with Because I Love You, and critic Choi Ji-ho thus called it "a noble finished product in itself", not only "beautiful", but "extraordinary". In an article published in February 2005, critic Im Jin-mo described Because I Love You as "a monumental achievement that brought about the full realization of the musical independence musicians dreamed of for the first time in the history of Korean pop music", referencing the fact that Yoo wrote, composed and arranged all the songs himself.

Music critic Shim Eui-pyeong noted that the reason Yoo's songs were still able to touch many people's sensibilities and inspire them was the innocence and purity they contained, contrasting with modern times, and that though his voice wasn't particularly strong or beautiful, its simplicity and lack of frills managed to leave a bigger impression and bring comfort.

In the polls conducted on a decennial basis among music critics, producers and industry journalists to determine the 100 best South Korean pop albums, Because I Love You ranked seventh in 1998, second in 2007 and first in 2018. Critic Park Eun-seok's comment to the latter positioning called it "a new model for writing pop music", identifying in Yoo's skill as an arranger, "an invisible hand that made Because I Love You sound fresh even to today's youth", the most powerful factor for the album's elevation to a "masterpiece of our time". He further stressed that while the record was universally recognized as the first in Korean music where a singer wrote, composed and arranged the songs all by himself, it was important to note that all of these was also done properly.

== Reissues ==
Because I Love You was reissued in 1987 both on vinyl, using a black and white photo of the singer posted on a wall for the cover and changing the order of the tracks, and on cassette. In 1988, Seoul Records released two CDs featuring a pastel portrait of Yoo by artist Seo Do-ho on the cover. It was remastered on cassette and CD with 24-bit/96 kHz audio on December 10, 2001, by T-Entertainment, and on CD by Loen on December 28, 2012, for its 25th anniversary.

In February 2014, the album was re-released in a thousand-copy remastered limited edition, LP format, containing the nine original songs, plus a cover of "Vincent" by Don McLean revealed for the first time by the family. The remastering cleaned the tracks of foreign sounds and adjusted the speed of the songs.

== Track listing ==
=== 1987 LP ===
Side A
No.	Title	Length
1.	"Our Love" (우리들의 사랑; Urideurui sarang)	4:31
2.	"You In My Arms" (그대 내 품에; Geudae nae pume)	5:53
3.	"Empty Tonight" (텅빈 오늘밤; Teongbin oneulbam)	4:55
4.	"My Image Reflected in My Heart" (내 마음에 비친 내 모습; Nae maeume bichin nae moseup)	4:48
5.	"Minuet" (경음악; Gyeongeumak)	2:39
Total length:		22:46

Side B
No.	Title	Length
1.	"Hidden Road" (가리워진 길; Gariwojin gil)	3:16
2.	"Past Days" (지난 날; Jinan nal)	5:00
3.	"Gloomy Letter" (우울한 편지; Uulhan pyeonji)	5:04
4.	"Because I Love You" (사랑하기 때문에; Saranghagi ttaemune)	6:15
5.	"Song of Purity" (정화의 노래; Jeonghwaui norae)

=== 2014 LP remastering ===
Side A
No.	Title	Length
1.	"Our Love" (우리들의 사랑)	4:35
2.	"You In My Arms" (그대 내 품에)	5:56
3.	"Empty Tonight" (텅빈 오늘밤)	4:58
4.	"My Image Reflected in My Heart" (내 마음에 비친 내 모습)	4:52
5.	"Minuet" (경음악)	2:41
Total length:		23:02

Side B
No.	Title	Length
1.	"Hidden Road" (가리워진 길)	3:17
2.	"Past Days" (지난 날)	5:03
3.	"Gloomy Letter" (우울한 편지)	5:06
4.	"Because I Love You" (사랑하기 때문에)	6:15
5.	"Vincent"	4:39
Total length:		24:20

== Personnel ==
Personnel as listed in the album's liner notes are:

- Yoo Jae-ha – lyrics, composition, arrangements, production, vocals (1–4, 6–9), piano (1–3, 6–9), synthesizer (1, 3, 4, 7), guitar (1, 3, 7, 9), background vocals (7)
- Jo Won-ik – bass (1–4, 7–9)
- Yoo Young-soo – drums (1, 2, 7, 9)
- Yoo Hyun-ah – violin (2, 5, 6, 8, 9)
- Jung Sung-hee – viola (2, 5, 8, 9)
- Kim Ae-ran – flute (2, 6, 8, 9)
- Kim Eun-young – violin (2, 6, 8, 9)
- Park Hae-jung – viola (2, 6, 8, 9)
- Kim Ji-yeon – cello (2, 6, 8, 9)
- Park Sang-eun – violin (2, 8, 9)
- Son Mi-ae – violin (2, 8, 9)
- Song Chang-soo – violin (2, 8, 9)
- Woo Hye-kyung – violin (2, 8, 9)
- Lee Young-hee – violin (2, 8, 9)
- Jo Won-kyung – violin (2, 8, 9)
- Choi Eun-mi – violin (2, 8, 9)
- Kwon Jin-young – viola (2, 8, 9)
- Kim Shin-bum – cello (2, 8, 9)
- Ahn Ki-seung – drums (3, 4, 8)
- No In-kyung – cello (5)
- Im Jung-hee – oboe (6)
- Kim Yoo-mi – bassoon (6)
- Lee Kwang-woon – clarinet (6, 9)
- Lee Ji-won – horn (6, 9)
- Lee Moon-se – background vocals (7)

== Charts ==
Chart (2014)	Peak position
South Korean Albums (Gaon)	37
