= List of K-pop songs on the World Digital Song Sales chart =

Current Billboard logo.

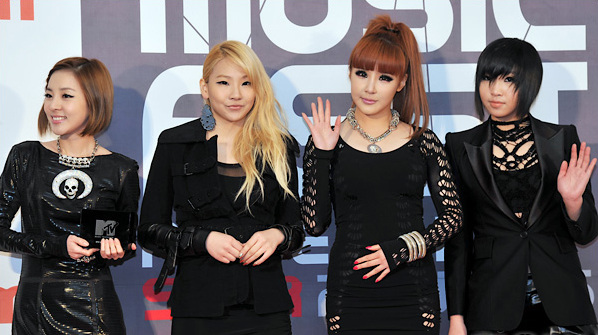
2NE1, at the MTV-DAUM Music Fest in Seoul in 2011. Although Psy was the first to top the chart with Gangnam Style in 2012, 2NE1's earlier 2011 debut on the chart "I Am the Best" eventually rose to No. 1 for two non-consecutive weeks in 2014 and 2015.

List of K-pop songs on the World Digital Song Sales chart is a compilation of weekly chart information for K-pop music published on the World Digital Song Sales chart by the Billboard charts, and reported on by Billboard K-Town, an online Billboard column. This is a list of K-pop songs and singles, and songs performed by K-pop artists, on the Billboard chart. More song chart information can be found at the List of K-pop songs on the Billboard charts.

== 2010–present ==
- This list depends on continual updates taken from *Billboard artist/title/chart search and *Billboard charts.
- The chart has been updated from 2010–present and is marked (Complete).
- Billboard artists comprehensive update incomplete.
- Figures in red highlight indicate the highest ranking achieved by K-pop artists on the chart.
- – Current week's charting

== World Digital Song Sales (Complete) ==
- Chart started 2010-01-23 listing the top 25; reduced to top 10 on 2023-10-28

Chart date	Artist	Song title	Peak position	Consecutive entry weeks	Total weeks
2010-07-31	Super Junior	"No Other"	5	3	3
2010-07-31	Taeyang	"Wedding Dress"	9	4	6
2010-07-31	Taeyang feat. G-Dragon	"I Need a Girl"	17	1	1
2010-08-07	Shinee	"Lucifer"	3	20	57
2010-08-07	Shinee	"Up and Down"	18	1	1
2010-10-02	2NE1	"Can't Nobody"	2	3	6
2010-10-02	2NE1	"Clap Your Hands"	4	2	2
2010-10-02	2NE1	"Go Away"	6	3	3
2010-10-23	Shinee	"Hello"	3	8	17
2010-10-30	2PM	"I'll Be Back"	3	3	3
2010-11-20	2NE1	"It Hurts"	7	1	1
2011-01-08	Super Junior	"Bonamana"	18	1	1
2011-01-22	GD & TOP	"Knock Out"	15	1	1
2011-01-22	GD & TOP	"High High"	17	2	2
2011-04-09	Se7en	"Drips"	22	1	2
2011-04-16	Jaejoong	"To You It's Goodbye, To Me It's Waiting"	2	1	1
2011-04-30	BigBang	"Love Song"	2	5	5
2011-04-30	BigBang	"Stupid Liar"	6	2	2
2011-04-30	BigBang	"Baby Don't Cry"	19	1	1
2011-04-30	BigBang	"Tonight"	19	2	2
2011-05-07	f(x)	"Pinocchio (Danger)"	7	3	3
2011-05-14	Jay Park	"Abandoned" feat. Dok2	2	2	2
2011-05-14	Jay Park	"Touch the Sky" feat. The Quiett	15	1	1
2011-05-14	Jay Park	"Tonight" feat. Kang Min-kyung	21	1	1
2011-07-02	f(x)	"Hot Summer"	8	4	4
2011-07-09	2PM	"Hands Up"	3	5	5
2011-07-09	2PM	"Electricity"	20	1	1
2011-07-30	Shinee	"Ring Ding Dong"	17	5	9
2011-07-30	Shinee	"Replay"	12	1	2
2011-08-06	2NE1	"Hate You"	2	6	6
2011-08-06	miss A	"Good-bye Baby"	3	5	5
2011-08-06	HyunA	"Bubble Pop!"	10	6	7
2011-08-06	2NE1	"Ugly"	2	6	6
2011-08-13	2NE1	"I Am the Best"	1 (Total 2 weeks) (Note: 2014-10-11 (1 week), 2015-02-14 (1 week))	31	121
2011-08-06	2NE1	"Don't Stop the Music"	10	1	1
2011-08-20	Super Junior	"Sorry, Sorry"	9	9	12
2011-08-20	Super Junior	"Opera"	17	1	1
2011-08-27	MBLAQ	"Mona Lisa"	16	1	1
2011-08-27	Jaejoong	"Jikyeojulge (I"ll Protect You)"	17	1	1
2011-09-24	U-KISS	"Neverland"	4	2	2
2011-10-01	JYJ	"In Heaven"	10	1	1
2011-10-08	Super Junior	"A-Cha"	2	6	10
2011-10-08	Super Junior	"Oops!"	10	1	1
2011-10-08	Super Junior	"Andante"	19	1	1
2011-10-08	Super Junior	"A Day"	22	1	1
2011-10-22	Brown Eyed Girls	"Sixth Sense"	18	1	1
2011-10-29	Tablo feat. Naul of Brown Eyed Soul	"Airbag"	10	1	1
2011-11-12	Tablo feat. Jinsil	"Bad"	7	2	2
2011-11-19	Jay Park	"Girlfriend"	4	1	1
2011-11-19	Wonder Girls	"Be My Baby"	2	13	13
2011-11-26	Girls' Generation	"Mr. Taxi"	12	3	5
2011-12-03	T-ara	"Cry Cry"	8	2	2
2011-12-17	IU	"You & I"	3	6	6
2012-01-07	Donghae & Eunhyuk	"Oppa, Oppa"	20	2	2
2012-01-21	T-ara	"Lovey-Dovey"	9	3	3
2012-01-28	MBLAQ	"It's War"	6	2	2
2012-01-28	Trouble Maker	"Trouble Maker"	13	4	4
2012-02-11	B.A.P	"Warrior"	5	3	3
2012-02-13	Block B	"NalinA"	3	3	3
2012-02-18	Se7en	"When I Can't Sing"	20	1	1
2012-02-25	Jay Park	"Know Your Name" feat. Dok2	3	2	2
2012-02-25	Jay Park	"Star"	22	1	1
2012-03-10	BigBang	"Blue"	3	10	10
2012-03-10	miss A	"Touch"	6	2	2
2012-03-10	BigBang	"Haru Haru"	13	1	1
2012-03-10	BigBang	"Lies"	24	1	1
2012-03-17	BigBang	"Bad Boy"	3	11	11
2012-03-17	BigBang	"Fantastic Baby"	3	114	136
2012-03-17	BigBang	"Love Dust"	6	2	2
2012-03-17	BigBang	"Ain't No Fun"	7	1	1
2012-03-17	Exo-K	"History"	4	6	6
2012-03-17	BigBang	"Wings"	10	1	1
2012-03-17	BigBang	"Intro"	12	1	1
2012-04-07	Shinee	"Sherlock (Clue + Note)"	4	10	10
2012-04-14	Shinhwa	"Venus"	14	1	1
2012-04-28	Sistar	"Alone"	7	4	5
2012-04-28	Exo-K	"Two Moons"	14	1	1
2012-04-28	Exo-K	"Angel"	15	1	1
2012-05-12	U-KISS	"DoraDora"	4	2	2
2012-05-12	Girls' Generation-TTS	"Twinkle"	4	6	7
2012-05-12	B.A.P	"Power"	9	3	3
2012-05-12	U-KISS	"Tick Tack"	14	1	1
2012-05-19	4Minute	"Volume Up"	9	2	2
2012-06-02	XIA feat. Flowsik	"Tarantallegra"	13	1	1
2012-06-02	IU	"Peach"	24	1	1
2012-06-09	JJ Project	"Bounce"	14	1	1
2012-06-09	B1A4	"Baby Goodnight"	15	1	1
2012-06-16	BigBang	"Monster"	3	15	15
2012-06-16	BigBang	"Still Alive"	5	3	3
2012-06-16	BigBang	"Bingle Bingle"	7	2	2
2012-06-16	BigBang	"Ego"	8	2	2
2012-06-16	BigBang	"Feeling"	9	2	2
2012-06-16	Wonder Girls	"Like This"	4	7	7
2012-06-30	f(x)	"Electric Shock"	3	13	13
2012-06-30	f(x)	"Beautiful Stranger"	18	1	1
2012-07-07	Teen Top	"To You"	21	1	1
2012-07-14	Super Junior	"Sexy, Free & Single"	4	9	9
2012-07-21	2NE1	"I Love You"	3	10	21
2012-07-21	Super Junior	"From You"	23	1	1
2012-07-28	Sistar	"Loving U"	16	1	1
2012-08-04	Psy	"Gangnam Style"	1 (Total 48 weeks ?) (Note: 2012-8-18 (36 weeks), 2013 -06-15 (12 weeks), rest of history incomplete)	?	381
2012-08-04	B.A.P	"No Mercy"	10	3	3
2012-08-11	BoA	"Only One"	7	3	3
2012-08-18	Super Junior	"Spy"	5	6	6
2012-08-18	Super Junior	"Haru"	14	1	1
2012-08-18	Super Junior	"Only U"	15	1	1
2012-08-18	Super Junior	"Outsider"	18	1	1
2012-08-25	B2ST	"Beautiful Night"	5	5	5
2012-08-25	Teen Top	"Be Ma Girl"	25	1	1
2012-09-08	Kara	"Pandora"	18	2	2
2012-09-15	B.A.P	"Crash"	19	2	2
2012-09-22	T-ara	"Sexy Love"	7	1	1
2012-09-22	Ultimate Pop Hits!	"Gangnam Style"	2	4	4
2012-09-22	Psy	"Right Now"	6	4	4
2012-09-29	G-Dragon	"One of a Kind"	7	5	5
2012-09-29	G-Dragon	"Crayon"	5	9	10
2012-09-29	Psy feat. G-Dragon	"Blue Frog"	20	2	2
2012-09-29	Psy feat. Sung Si-kyung	"Passionate Goodbye"	22	2	3
2012-09-29	G-Dragon feat. Kim Yuna of Jaurim	"Missing You"	23	1	1
2012-10-06	U-Kiss	"Stop Girl"	8	4	4
2012-10-13	TVXQ	"Catch Me"	7	5	5
2012-10-27	Epik High feat. Lee Hi	"It's Cold"	5	1	1
2012-11-03	miss A	"I Don't Need a Man"	5	4	4
2012-11-03	Block B	"Nillili Mambo"	6	3	3
2012-11-03	Ailee	"I Will Show You"	7	3	3
2012-11-10	B.A.P	"Stop It"	5	3	3
2012-11-10	B.A.P	"Yessir"	10	1	1
2012-11-10	B.A.P	"Happy Birthday"	12	1	1
2012-11-17	HyunA	"Ice Cream"	5	4	4
2012-11-17	Lee Hi	"1,2,3,4"	5	4	4
2012-11-17	Girls' Generation	"Paparazzi"	20	1	1
2012-12-01	B1A4	"Tried to Walk"	5	1	1
2012-12-15	TVXQ	"Humanoids"	8	3	3
2013-01-05	Girls' Generation	"Dancing Queen"	5	3	3
2013-01-19	Girls' Generation	"I Got a Boy"	3	10	24
2013-01-19	Girls' Generation	"Talk Talk"	18	1	1
2013-01-19	Girls' Generation	"Romantic St."	22	1	1
2013-01-26	Super Junior-M	"Break Down"	5	5	5
2013-01-26	Super Junior-M	"Go"	19	1	1
2013-02-02	B.A.P	"Rain Sound"	5	3	4
2013-02-02	Infinite H feat. Bumkey	"Special Girl"	11	1	1
2013-02-02	CNBLUE	"I'm Sorry"	17	2	2
2013-02-09	Jaejoong	"Mine"	6	2	2
2013-02-16	Sistar	"Gone Not Around Any Longer"	5	5	5
2013-02-16	BoA	"Disturbance"	8	2	2
2013-02-16	Boyfriend	"I Yah"	19	1	1
2013-03-02	B.A.P	"One Shot"	3	4	7
2013-03-02	B.A.P	"Coma"	7	1	1
2013-03-02	B.A.P	"Punch"	13	1	1
2013-03-02	B.A.P	"0(Zero)"	16	1	1
2013-03-09	Shinee	"Dream Girl"	3	3	6
2013-03-09	Shinee	"Spoiler"	17	1	1
2013-03-09	Shinee	"Dynamite"	21	1	1
2013-03-09	Shinee	"Beautiful"	22	1	1
2013-03-16	Teen Top	"Miss Right"	6	2	5
2013-03-23	U-KISS	"Standing Still"	6	1	3
2013-03-23	Lee Hi	"It's Over"	13	1	2
2013-04-06	Infinite	"Man in Love"	8	3	3
2013-04-06	Girl's Day	"Expect"	15	2	2
2013-04-13	Lee Hi	"Rose"	4	3	3
2013-04-27	Psy	"Gentleman"	1 (Total 7 weeks ?) (Note: Entered at No. 1 for 7 weeks, rest of history incomplete)	?	101
2013-04-27	Jay Park	"Joah"	4	1	1
2013-04-27	Jay Park	"Welcome"	6	1	1
2013-04-27	K.Will	"Love Blossom"	17	1	1
2013-04-27	G.NA feat. Jung Il-hoon of BtoB	"Oops!"	19	1	1
2013-05-04	Brown Eyed Girls	"Abracadabra"	21	1	1
2013-05-11	Shinee	"Why So Serious?"	6	5	5
2013-05-11	Shinee	"Evil"	21	1	1
2013-05-18	T-ara N4 feat. Duble Sidekick & Taewoon	"Jeon Won Diary"	5	2	2
2013-05-25	2PM	"Comeback When You Hear This Song"	5	3	3
2013-05-25	2PM	"A.D.T.O.Y."	5	4	8
2013-05-25	B1A4	"What's Going On?"	8	4	4
2013-06-08	VIXX	"Hyde"	6	2	2
2013-06-08	4Minute	"What's Your Name"	9	2	2
2013-06-15	CL	"The Baddest Female"	4	7	8
2013-06-15	Exo	"Wolf"	4	9	9
2013-06-15	Exo	"Baby Don't Cry"	6	3	3
2013-06-15	Exo	"Black Pearl"	8	2	2
2013-06-15	Exo	"Heart Attack"	11	2	2
2013-06-15	Exo	"Let Out the Beast"	10	2	2
2013-06-15	Exo	"Don't Go"	13	2	2
2013-06-22	Henry Lau	"Trap"	5	6	8
2013-06-22	Exo	"Peter Pan"	16	1	1
2013-06-22	MBLAQ	"Smokey Girl"	12	4	4
2013-06-22	Exo	"Baby"	20	1	1
2013-06-22	Exo	"3.6.5"	24	1	1
2013-06-29	Sistar	"Give It To Me"	6	5	5
2013-06-29	BTS	"No More Dream"	1 (Note: Peaked at No. 1 on 2023-12-30 (1 week))	3	8
2013-07-06	Wonder Boyz	"Tarzan"	22	1	1
2013-07-13	B.A.P	"Coffee Shop"	4	4	4
2013-07-13	Girl's Day	"Female President"	7	1	1
2013-07-20	XIA	"11am"	22	1	1
2013-07-27	2NE1	"Falling in Love"	4	7	7
2013-07-27	Ailee	"U&I"	14	3	3
2013-07-27	Jay Park	"I Like 2 Party"	16	2	2
2013-08-03	B.A.P	"Hurricane"	4	4	4
2013-08-03	Kim Hyun-joong feat. Jay Park	"Unbreakable"	9	2	2
2013-08-03	XIA feat. Quincy	"Incredible"	10	2	2
2013-08-17	Exo	"Growl"	3	30	39
2013-08-17	f(x)	"Rum Pum Pum Pum"	5	5	5
2013-08-17	Exo	"XOXO (Kisses & Hugs)"	6	3	3
2013-08-17	Exo	"Lucky"	7	3	3
2013-08-17	VIXX	"G.R.8.U"	10	2	2
2013-08-17	Brown Eyed Girls	"Kill Bill"	12	1	1
2013-08-17	4Minute	"Is It Poppin'?"	18	1	1
2013-08-17	f(x)	"Shadow"	21	1	1
2013-08-24	2NE1	"Do You Love Me"	4	5	5
2013-08-31	B2ST	"Shadow"	7	3	3
2013-09-07	Seungri	"Let's Talk About Love"	9	1	1
2013-09-14	Teen Top	"Rocking"	5	5	5
2013-09-21	G-Dragon feat. Diplo & Baauer	"Coup d'Etat"	4	4	4
2013-09-21	G-Dragon	"Crooked"	5	12	12
2013-09-21	G-Dragon feat. Missy Elliott	"Niliria"	8	2	2
2013-09-21	G-Dragon	"Go"	9	3	3
2013-09-21	G-Dragon feat. Sky Ferreira	"Black"	10	2	2
2013-09-21	G-Dragon	"Shake the World"	11	1	1
2013-09-21	G-Dragon feat. Lydia Paek	"R.O.D."	16	2	2
2013-09-21	G-Dragon	"Who You?"	6	1	4
2013-10-12	Block B	"Be the Light"	6	2	2
2013-10-19	Block B	"Very Good"	4	6	6
2013-10-26	T-ara	"Number 9"	7	3	3
2013-10-26	IU	"The Red Shoes"	19	1	1
2013-11-02	Shinee	"Everybody"	3	6	7
2013-11-02	Shinee	"Symptoms"	5	3	3
2013-11-02	Jaejoong	"Shiny Day"	9	1	1
2013-11-09	Jaejoong	"Butterfly"	4	11	11
2013-11-16	Geumary (Park Myung Soo & Primary) feat. Gaeko	"I Got C"	6	2	2
2013-11-16	Jaejoong	"Just Another Girl"	10	1	1
2013-11-16	UKISS	"My Girl"	17	2	2
2013-11-16	Win	"Climax (Team B)"	19	1	1
2013-11-16	Win	"Just Another Boy (Team A)"	23	1	1
2013-11-23	Taeyang	"Ringa Linga"	2	16	16
2013-11-23	miss A	"Hush"	4	5	5
2013-11-30	T.O.P	"Doom Dada"	3	9	9
2013-12-07	2NE1	"Missing You"	2	6	7
2013-12-07	VIXX	"Only U"	8	2	2
2013-12-14	VIXX	"Voodoo Doll"	4	5	5
2013-12-14	Hyolyn	"One Way Love"	11	2	2
2013-12-21	Exo	"Miracles in December"	3	4	4
2013-12-28	Exo	"My Turn to Cry"	7	1	1
2013-12-28	Exo	"The Star"	9	1	1
2013-12-28	Exo	"Christmas Day"	10	2	2
2014-01-04	Donghae & Eunhyuk	"Still You"	5	1	1
2014-01-18	Girl's Day	"Something"	9	4	4
2014-01-18	Rain	"30 Sexy"	15	2	3
2014-01-18	Rain	"La Song"	25	1	1
2014-01-25	TVXQ	"Something"	5	2	2
2014-02-01	B1A4	"Lonely"	10	3	3
2014-02-08	Got7	"Girls Girls Girls"	8	3	3
2014-02-22	B.A.P	"1004 (Angel)"	4	3	3
2014-02-22	Royal Pirates	"Drawing the Line"	13	1	1
2014-02-22	B.A.P	"Save Me"	21	1	1
2014-03-01	BTS	"Boy in Luv"	3	4	21
2014-03-01	SM the Ballad feat. Taeyeon & Jonghyun	"Breath"	8	1	1
2014-03-01	Sung Si-kyung	"Every Moment of You"	14	2	2
2014-03-01	BTS	"Tomorrow"	7	1	2
2014-03-08	Sunmi feat. Lena	"Full Moon"	13	1	1
2014-03-15	Girls' Generation	"Mr.Mr."	4	9	9
2014-03-15	2NE1	"Come Back Home"	4	10	13
2014-03-15	2NE1	"Crush"	7	2	2
2014-03-15	2NE1	"MTBD (CL solo)"	9	3	6
2014-03-15	TVXQ	"Spellbound"	15	1	1
2014-03-15	2NE1	"Gotta Be You"	16	1	1
2014-03-15	CNBLUE	"Can't Stop"	19	1	1
2014-03-15	2NE1	"Scream"	20	1	1
2014-03-15	2NE1	"If I Were You"	24	1	1
2014-03-22	2NE1	"Happy"	15	1	1
2014-03-29	Orange Caramel	"Catallena"	11	3	3
2014-04-05	Michelle Lee	"Without You"	14	2	2
2014-04-12	MBLAQ	"Be a Man"	9	2	2
2014-04-19	Super Junior-M	"Swing"	5	3	3
2014-04-19	Crayon Pop	"Uh-ee"	15	1	1
2014-04-26	AKMU	"200%"	5	6	6
2014-04-26	Eric Nam feat. Hoya	"Ooh Ooh"	6	1	1
2014-04-26	Jay Park feat. Simon Dominic & Gray	"Metronome"	7	2	2
2014-04-26	4Minute	"Whatcha Doin' Today"	12	1	1
2014-04-26	Jay Park	"Ride Me"	16	1	1
2014-04-26	Apink	"Mr. Chu"	20	1	1
2014-04-26	High4 with IU	"Not Spring, Love, or Cherry Blossoms"	21	1	1
2014-04-26	BTS	"Just One Day"	5	1	3
2014-05-03	AKMU	"Melted"	21	1	1
2014-05-24	Exo	"Overdose"	2	14	54
2014-05-24	Exo	"Thunder"	5	2	2
2014-05-24	Exo	"Moonlight"	16	1	1
2014-05-24	Exo	"Love, Love, Love"	19	1	1
2014-05-24	Exo	"Run"	23	1	1
2014-05-31	Hyoseong	"Good-Night Kiss"	13	1	1
2014-06-07	Infinite	"Last Romeo"	8	2	2
2014-06-14	VIXX	"Eternity"	3	2	2
2014-06-21	Taeyang	"Eyes, Nose, Lips"	3	11	21
2014-06-21	Taeyang feat. G-Dragon	"Stay With Me"	4	2	2
2014-06-21	B.A.P	"Where Are You"	6	1	1
2014-06-21	Taeyang	"1AM"	10	2	2
2014-06-21	UKISS	"Quit Playing"	11	1	1
2014-06-21	Taeyang	"Love You to Death"	12	1	1
2014-06-21	Soyou & Junggigo feat. Geeks' Lil Boi	"Some"	19	1	1
2014-06-21	B.A.P	"Just For Today"	21	1	1
2014-06-21	Taeyang	"Body"	22	1	1
2014-06-28	Psy feat. Snoop Dogg	"Hangover"	1 (Note: Entered at No. 1 for 1 week)	?	15
2014-07-12	Got7	"A"	5	3	3
2014-07-12	Got7	"Good Tonight"	18	1	1
2014-07-26	f(x)	"Red Light"	3	3	3
2014-07-26	B2ST	"Good Luck"	5	3	3
2014-07-26	f(x)	"Milk"	9	1	1
2014-07-26	Nu'est	"Good Bye Bye"	19	1	1
2014-07-26	f(x)	"Dracula"	21	1	1
2014-08-02	Girl's Day	"Darling"	5	2	2
2014-08-02	Henry Lau	"Fantastic"	8	1	1
2014-08-02	B1A4	"Solo Day"	16	1	1
2014-08-09	Sistar	"Touch My Body"	3	3	3
2014-08-09	Block B	"Her"	4	3	3
2014-08-09	Block B	"Jackpot"	7	1	1
2014-08-16	Infinite	"Back"	4	3	3
2014-08-16	JYJ	"Back Seat"	11	1	1
2014-08-23	Red Velvet	"Happiness"	4	3	3
2014-08-30	Winner	"Empty"	4	2	2
2014-08-30	Ailee	"Good Bye My Love"	13	3	3
2014-08-30	Winner	"Color Ring"	24	1	1
2014-09-06	Taemin	"Danger"	4	4	4
2014-09-06	Orange Caramel	"My Copycat"	6	3	3
2014-09-06	BTS	"Danger"	1 (Note: Peaked at No. 1 on 2024-02-03 (1 week))	2	9
2014-09-06	Kara	"Mamma Mia"	14	1	1
2014-09-06	Taemin	"Pretty Boy"	15	1	1
2014-09-06	Taemin	"Ace"	25	1	1
2014-09-13	Super Junior	"Mamacita"	4	4	4
2014-09-13	Sistar	"I Swear"	6	2	2
2014-09-20	HyunA	"Red"	5	3	3
2014-09-20	Ladies' Code	"I'm Fine Thank You"	6	1	1
2014-09-20	Ladies' Code	"Kiss Kiss"	21	1	1
2014-09-27	T-ara	"Sugar Free"	4	5	5
2014-09-27	Team B	"Wait for Me"	22	1	1
2014-10-04	2PM	"Go Crazy!"	5	5	6
2014-10-04	Girls' Generation-TTS	"Holler"	6	2	2
2014-10-04	Teen Top	"Missing"	14	1	1
2014-10-11	Ailee	"Don't Touch Me"	16	2	2
2014-10-11	Song Jieun	"Don't Look At Me Like That"	22	1	1
2014-10-25	AKMU	"Time and Fallen Leaves"	6	2	2
2014-10-25	IU & Seo Taiji	"Sogyeokdong"	21	1	1
2014-11-01	Red Velvet feat. SM Rookies SR14B Taeyong	"Be Natural"	6	1	1
2014-11-08	VIXX	"Error"	4	6	6
2014-11-08	Epik High feat. Beenzino, Verbal Jint, B.I, Mino, Bobby	"Born Hater"	5	2	2
2014-11-08	Super Junior	"This is Love"	8	3	3
2014-11-08	BTS	"War of Hormone"	11	2	8
2014-11-08	Epik High feat. Taeyang	"Eyes Nose Lips"	12	1	1
2014-11-08	Epik High feat. Joe Won Sun	"Happen Ending"	14	1	1
2014-11-08	Epik High	"Spoiler"	16	1	1
2014-11-15	Zhou Mi	"Rewind"	5	3	3
2014-11-15	Super Junior	"Evanesce"	17	1	1
2014-11-29	Hi Suhyun feat. Bobby	"I'm Different"	3	4	4
2014-12-06	GD X Taeyang	"Good Boy"	1	19	25
2014-12-06	Got7	"Stop Stop It"	4	6	6
2014-12-06	B2ST	"12:30"	8	1	1
2014-12-13	Apink	"Luv"	5	1	1
2014-12-13	AOA	"Like a Cat"	7	3	3
2014-12-20	Masta Wu feat. Dok2 & Bobby	"Come Here"	4	1	1
2015-01-10	Exo	"December, 2014 (The Winter's Tale)"	14	1	1
2015-01-24	Hello Venus	"Wiggle Wiggle"	8	1	1
2015-01-31	Jonghyun feat. Iron	"Crazy (Guilty Pleasure)"	12	1	1
2015-01-31	Jonghyun feat. Zion.T	"Déjà-Boo"	21	1	1
2015-02-07	Jung Seung-hwan & Park Yun Ha	"Forgot You In Sad"	21	1	1
2015-02-07	G.Soul	"You"	23	1	1
2015-02-28	Amber feat. Taeyeon	"Shake That Brass"	4	3	3
2015-03-14	VIXX	"Love Equation"	9	1	1
2015-03-14	Rainbow	"Black Swan"	16	1	1
2015-03-14	Shinhwa	"Sniper"	18	1	1
2015-03-21	4Minute	"Crazy"	2	11	11
2015-03-01	XIA feat. Tablo	"Flower"	4	1	1
2015-03-21	Rap Monster & Warren G	"P.D.D"	9	1	1
2015-03-21	Donghae & Eunhyuk	"Growing Pains"	15	1	1
2015-03-28	Boyfriend	"Bounce"	18	1	1
2015-04-04	Red Velvet	"Ice Cream Cake"	3	5	5
2015-04-04	Red Velvet	"Automatic"	9	1	1
2015-04-04	Minah	"I Am A Woman Too"	17	1	1
2015-04-18	Exo	"Call Me Baby"	2	18	36
2015-04-18	miss A	"Only You"	6	4	4
2015-04-18	Exo	"El Dorado"	7	1	1
2015-04-18	Exo	"Exodus"	8	2	2
2015-04-18	Exo	"Transformer"	11	1	1
2015-04-18	Exo	"Hurt"	14	1	1
2015-04-18	Exo	"Playboy"	18	1	1
2015-04-18	Exo	"Beautiful"	19	1	1
2015-04-18	Exo	"What If"	24	1	1
2015-04-25	Girls' Generation	"Catch Me If You Can"	2	11	11
2015-04-25	Girls' Generation	"Girls"	7	2	2
2015-05-02	Bastarz	"Conduct Zero"	5	2	2
2015-05-02	EXID	"Ah Yeah"	6	4	4
2015-05-02	Jinusean feat. Jang Han Na	"Tell Me One More Time"	9	1	1
2015-05-02	J.Y. Park feat. Jessi	"Who's Your Mama?"	12	1	1
2015-05-09	Lim Kim	"Awoo"	9	2	2
2015-05-09	Baekhyun	"Beautiful"	10	1	1
2015-05-09	Uniq	"EOEO"	16	3	3
2015-05-16	BigBang	"Loser"	1	13	24
2015-05-16	BigBang	"Bae Bae"	2	23	23
2015-05-16	BTS	"I Need U"	3	17	123
2015-05-16	BTS	"Dope"	3	1	140
2015-05-16	BTS	"Hold Me Tight"	12	1	1
2015-05-16	BTS	"Boyz with Fun"	13	1	1
2015-05-16	BTS	"Converse High"	15	1	1
2015-05-16	BTS	"Outro: Love Is Not Over"	10	2	2
2015-05-30	Girl's Day	"Hello Bubble"	11	1	1
2015-05-30	BoA	"Kiss My Lips"	12	1	1
2015-05-30	BoA feat. Gaeko	"Who Are You"	16	1	1
2015-06-06	Shinee	"View"	2	6	6
2015-06-06	Jay Park feat. Ugly Duck	"Mommae"	12	2	2
2015-06-06	Monsta X	"Trespass"	14	1	1
2015-06-06	Tiger JK	"Reset"	22	1	1
2015-06-13	Kara	"Cupid"	12	1	1
2015-06-20	BigBang	"Bang Bang Bang"	1	57	58
2015-06-20	BigBang	"We Like 2 Party"	2	8	13
2015-06-20	Exo	"Love Me Right"	3	7	9
2015-06-20	Exo	"EXO 2014"	5	2	2
2015-06-20	Exo	"Tender Love"	6	2	2
2015-06-20	Exo	"First Love"	7	2	2
2015-06-20	Seventeen	"Adore U"	13	5	5
2015-07-04	2PM	"My House"	7	2	2
2015-07-04	Tiger JK feat. Yoon Mi-rae	"Forever"	24	1	1
2015-07-11	Sistar	"Shake It"	6	4	6
2015-07-11	AOA	"Heart Attack"	7	3	3
2015-07-11	Teen Top	"Ah-Ah"	20	1	1
2015-07-13	BigBang	"If You"	2	17	17
2015-07-13	BigBang	"Sober"	3	16	16
2015-07-13	Nine Muses	"Hurt Locker"	20	2	2
2015-07-25	Girls' Generation	"Party"	4	7	7
2015-07-25	Girls' Generation	"Check"	9	2	2
2015-07-25	Girl's Day	"Ring My Bell"	25	1	1
2015-08-01	Got7	"Just Right"	3	32	32
2015-08-01	Super Junior	"Devil"	6	5	5
2015-08-08	Apink	"Remember"	14	1	1
2015-08-08	Jay Park feat. Loco and Gray	"My Last"	19	1	1
2015-08-08	Zion.T	"Yanghwa BRDG"	17	2	2
2015-08-15	Zion.T	"Eat"	25	1	1
2015-08-22	BigBang	"Let's Not Fall In Love"	1	15	15
2015-08-22	GD & TOP	"Zutter"	2	13	13
2015-08-22	Shinee	"Married to the Music"	5	4	4
2015-08-22	Shinee	"Savior"	8	1	1
2015-08-22	Shinee	"Chocolate"	10	1	1
2015-08-22	Wonder Girls	"I Feel You"	12	2	2
2015-08-22	Shinee	"Hold You"	14	1	1
2015-09-05	Girls' Generation	"You Think"	3	4	4
2015-09-05	Girls' Generation	"Lion Heart"	3	6	6
2015-09-05	VIXX LR	"Beautiful Liar"	8	2	2
2015-09-12	Mino feat. Taeyang	"Fear"	9	2	2
2015-09-12	Hwangtaeji – Kwanghee, G-Dragon, Taeyang	"Oh My God"	10	1	1
2015-09-12	IU feat. Park Myeong-su	"Leong"	18	1	1
2015-09-12	B2ST	"YeY"	21	1	1
2015-09-26	Red Velvet	"Dumb Dumb"	3	9	9
2015-09-26	Seventeen	"Mansae"	5	6	6
2015-09-26	Day6	"Congratulations"	6	2	2
2015-09-26	Tablo and Joey Bada$$	"Hood"	9	2	2
2015-09-26	Seventeen	"Rock"	19	1	1
2015-09-26	Seventeen	"Fronting"	21	1	1
2015-09-26	Seventeen	"OMG"	23	1	1
2015-10-03	iKON	"My Type"	3	2	2
2015-10-03	Super Junior	"Magic"	13	2	2
2015-10-10	HyunA feat. Jung Il-hoon of BtoB	"Roll Deep"	3	3	3
2015-10-17	iKON	"Rhythm Ta"	11	4	4
2015-10-17	iKON	"Airplane"	21	2	2
2015-10-24	Jay Park feat. Hoody	"$olo"	11	2	2
2015-10-24	Ailee	"Mind Your Own Business"	20	1	1
2015-10-31	Oh My Girl	"Closer"	12	1	1
2015-11-14	f(x)	"4 Walls"	2	5	5
2015-11-14	IU	"Twenty-Three"	4	3	3
2015-11-14	MONSTA X	"Hero"	12	4	4
2015-11-28	Exo	"Lightsaber"	3	9	9
2015-11-28	VIXX	"Chained Up"	4	3	3
2015-11-28	Jay Park feat. Okasian	"You Know"	9	1	1
2015-12-05	iKON	"Apology"	3	3	3
2015-12-05	iKON	"Anthem"	4	2	2
2015-12-05	B.A.P	"Young, Wild & Free"	6	2	2
2015-12-05	MADTOWN	"OMGT"	22	1	1
2015-12-19	Psy feat. CL	"Daddy"	1 (Total 2 weeks) (Note: Entered at No. 1 for 2 weeks)	23	25
2015-12-19	BTS	"Run"	3	19	44
2015-12-19	BTS	"Butterfly"	4	10	13
2015-12-19	Got7	"Confession Song"	5	3	3
2015-12-19	BTS	"Silver Spoon"	8	2	12
2015-12-19	BTS	"Ma City"	1 (Note: Peaked at No. 1 on 2025-11-22 (1 week))	1	2
2015-12-19	BTS	"Autumn Leaves"	10	1	1
2015-12-19	BTS	"Outro: House Of Cards"	9	4	4
2015-12-19	Psy	"Napal Baji"	12	3	3
2015-12-19	BTS	"Whalien 52"	14	1	1
2015-12-19	BTS	"Intro: Never Mind"	19	1	1
2015-12-19	Got7	"To. Star"	21	1	1
2015-12-19	Got7	"Everyday"	22	1	1
2015-12-26	Seventeen and Ailee	"Q&A"	3	4	4
2015-12-26	Girls' Generation-TTS	"Dear Santa"	7	2	2
2015-12-26	Zico feat. Zion.T	"Eureka"	11	2	2
2015-12-26	Twice	"Like Ooh-Ahh"	6	11	11
2015-12-26	Zico	"Veni Vidi Vici"	16	1	1
2015-12-26	Zico feat. Suran	"Pride And Prejudice"	19	1	1
2016-01-02	Exo	"Unfair"	9	3	1
2016-01-02	Exo	"Girl x Friend"	9	1	5
2016-01-02	Exo	"On the Snow"	23	1	1
2016-01-09	iKON	"Dumb and Dumber"	7	4	4
2016-01-09	iKON	"What's Wrong?"	14	1	1
2016-01-09	iKON	"I Miss You So Bad"	17	1	1
2016-01-16	EXID	"Hot Pink"	9	3	3
2016-01-30	Bae Suzy & Baekhyun	"Dream"	3	2	2
2016-01-30	Mino & Taehyun	"Pricked"	4	1	1
2016-01-30	Dalshabet	"Someone Like U"	18	1	1
2016-02-13	Zico	"I Am You, You Are Me"	4	3	3
2016-02-13	Zico feat. Luna	"It Was Love"	20	1	1
2016-02-20	4Minute	"Hate"	2	11	11
2016-02-20	Taeyeon	"Rain"	3	3	3
2016-02-20	Taeyeon	"Secret"	7	2	2
2016-02-20	Mamamoo	"I Miss You"	16	1	1
2016-03-05	AOA Cream	"I'm Jelly Baby"	4	1	1
2016-03-05	Mamamoo	"1cm Pride (Taller Than You)"	8	2	2
2016-03-12	Yoo Young-jin and D.O.	"Tell Me (What Is Love)"	2	1	1
2016-03-12	Taemin	"Press Your Number"	3	3	3
2016-03-12	Taemin	"Drip Drop"	4	3	3
2016-03-12	Nu'est	"Overcome"	5	1	1
2016-03-12	Ladies' Code	"Galaxy"	9	2	2
2016-03-12	B.A.P	"Feel So Good"	10	3	3
2016-03-12	Brave Girls	"Deepened"	14	1	1
2016-03-12	Ladies' Code	"My Flower"	15	1	1
2016-03-12	Ladies' Code	"Chaconne"	17	1	1
2016-03-19	Mamamoo	"You're The Best"	3	2	2
2016-03-19	Stellar	"Sting"	16	1	1
2016-03-19	Chen and Punch	"Everytime"	14	4	8
2016-03-19	Yoon Mi-rae	"Always"	7	9	9
2016-03-26	Ji-min feat. Xiumin	"Call You Bae"	5	1	1
2016-03-26	KNK	"Knock"	18	1	1
2016-03-26	Lee Hi	"Breathe"	20	1	2
2016-03-26	Davichi	"This Love"	22	2	2
2016-04-02	Gummy	"You Are My Everything"	4	8	8
2016-04-02	Yoona feat. 10cm	"Deoksugung Stonewall Walkway"	7	1	1
2016-04-02	Red Velvet	"One of These Nights"	6	3	3
2016-04-02	Mad Clown and Kim Na Young	"Once Again"	14	2	5
2016-04-09	Got7	"Fly"	2	7	7
2016-04-09	K.Will	"Taeyangyi Huye" ("Talk Love"?)	3	6	6
2016-04-09	Got7	"Can't"	19	1	1
2016-04-09	Got7	"Rewind"	21	1	1
2016-04-09	Red Velvet	"Cool Hot Sweet Love"	23	1	1
2016-04-09	Got7	"Beggin On My Knees"	24	1	1
2016-04-16	Block B	"A Few Years Later"	6	2	2
2016-04-16	Oh My Girl	"Liar Liar"	9	2	2
2016-04-16	Dean	"Bonnie & Clyde"	12	1	1
2016-04-16	Day6	"Letting Go"	16	2	2
2016-04-23	Boys Republic	"Get Down"	25	1	1
2016-04-30	NCT U	"The 7th Sense"	2	7	7
2016-04-30	NCT U	"Without You"	3	3	3
2016-04-30	Got7	"Home Run"	3	3	3
2016-04-30	Block B	"Toy"	5	3	3
2016-04-30	XIA	"How Can I Love You"	12	2	2
2016-04-30	Chen, Heize and Vibe	"Lil' Something"	17	1	1
2016-05-07	VIXX	"Dynamite"	4	3	3
2016-05-14	Twice	"Cheer Up"	3	7	10
2016-05-14	Seventeen	"Pretty U"	4	3	3
2016-05-21	BTS	"Fire"	1	26	124
2016-05-21	BTS	"Save Me"	2	26	113
2016-05-21	BTS	"Epilogue: Young Forever"	3	5	7
2016-05-21	BTS	"House of Cards"	9	3	3
2016-05-21	BTS	"Love Is Not Over"	10	1	1
2016-05-21	BTS	"Intro: The Most Beautiful Moment In Life"	24	1	1
2016-05-28	R3hab, Amber and Luna feat. Xavi & GI	"Wave"	5	2	2
2016-05-28	Tiffany	"I Just Wanna Dance"	5	4	4
2016-05-28	Tiffany	"What Do I Do"	14	1	1
2016-06-04	AOA	"Good Luck"	5	3	3
2016-06-04	Jessica Jung feat. Fabolous	"Fly"	9	3	3
2016-06-04	Amber feat. Gen Neo	"On My Own"	11	2	2
2016-06-04	Monsta X	"All In"	6	3	3
2016-06-04	K.Will and Baekhyun	"The Day"	21	1	1
2016-06-11	BgA (*K-pop parody group)	"Dong Saya Dae"	7	1	2
2016-06-11	Jonghyun	"She Is"	18	2	2
2016-06-18	iKON	"#WYD"	6	1	1
2016-06-18	Luna	"Free Somebody"	8	2	2
2016-06-18	Oh My Girl	"Windy Day"	23	1	1
2016-06-18	EXID	"L.I.E"	16	3	3
2016-06-25	Exo	"Monster"	1 (Total 2 weeks)	18	25
2016-06-25	Exo	"Lucky One"	3	9	11
2016-06-25	Exo	"Artificial Love"	5	2	2
2016-06-25	Exo	"Heaven"	6	2	2
2016-06-25	Exo	"They Never Know"	8	2	2
2016-06-25	Exo	"Cloud Nine"	9	2	2
2016-06-25	Exo	"White Noise"	11	2	2
2016-06-25	Exo	"One and Only"	12	2	2
2016-06-25	Exo	"Stronger"	13	2	2
2016-06-25	Heize feat. DEAN	"Shut Up & Groove"	24	1	1
2016-07-09	Sistar	"I Like That"	4	6	6
2016-07-09	BoA feat. Beenzino	"No Matter What"	17	1	1
2016-07-16	Taeyeon feat. DEAN	"Starlight"	6	1	1
2016-07-16	Taeyeon	"Why"	6	6	6
2016-07-16	Simon Dominic, Gray & One	"Comfortable"	13	1	1
2016-07-23	Seventeen	"Very Nice"	2	6	6
2016-07-23	Wonder Girls	"Why So Lonely"	5	5	5
2016-07-23	Seventeen	"No F.U.N"	7	1	1
2016-07-23	Seventeen	"Simple"	8	1	1
2016-07-23	Seventeen	"Healing"	9	1	1
2016-07-23	Seventeen	"Space"	15	1	1
2016-07-23	Wonder Girls	"Beautiful Boy"	16	1	1
2016-07-23	Wonder Girls	"Sweet & Easy"	17	1	1
2016-07-23	ASTRO	"Breathless"	21	1	1
2016-07-30	NCT 127	"Fire Truck"	2	4	4
2016-07-30	GFriend	"Navillera"	12	3	3
2016-07-30	B2ST	"Ribbon"	17	1	1
2016-08-06	Eric Nam feat. Loco	"Can't Help Myself"	4	3	3
2016-08-06	Jay Park feat. Ugly Duck	"Ain't No Party Like An AOMG Party"	24	1	1
2016-08-13	f(x)	"All Mine"	2	2	2
2016-08-13	Fei	"Fantasy"	6	1	1
2016-08-27	Blackpink	"Boombayah"	1	17	39
2016-08-27	Blackpink	"Whistle"	2	9	18
2016-08-27	Girls' Generation	"Sailing (0805)"	6	1	1
2016-08-27	B.A.P	"That's My Jam"	7	2	2
2016-08-27	HyunA	"How's This?"	8	2	2
2016-08-27	Monsta X	"Stuck"	11	2	2
2016-08-27	I.O.I	"Whatta Man"	12	2	2
2016-08-27	Taemin	"Goodbye"	14	1	1
2016-08-27	B.A.P	"Do What I Feel"	16	1	1
2016-08-27	B.A.P	"What More Can I Say"	17	1	1
2016-09-03	VIXX	"Fantasy"	5	2	2
2016-09-03	VIXX	"Love Me Do"	16	1	1
2016-09-10	Exo	"Lotto"	1	7	8
2016-09-10	Exo	"Can't Bring Me Down"	3	1	1
2016-09-10	Exo	"She's Dreaming"	5	1	1
2016-09-10	Yuri and Seohyun	"Secret"	10	1	1
2016-09-17	NCT Dream	"Chewing Gum"	2	2	2
2016-09-17	Baekhyun, Chen & Xiumin	"For You"	9	3	3
2016-09-17	J.Y. Park, Hyoyeon, Min and Jo Kwon	"Born To Be Wild"	11	1	1
2016-09-17	Spica	"Secret Time"	20	1	1
2016-09-17	Nu'est	"Love Paint"	22	1	1
2016-09-24	Red Velvet	"Russian Roulette"	2	5	5
2016-09-24	Bobby	"HOLUP!"	3	2	2
2016-09-24	Mino	"Body"	4	3	3
2016-10-01	MOBB feat. KUSH	"Hit Me"	3	1	1
2016-10-01	MOBB	"Full House"	4	1	1
2016-10-01	2PM	"Promise (I'll Be)"	11	3	3
2016-10-08	Yoo Jae-suk X Exo	"Dancing King"	2	6	6
2016-10-08	Infinite	"The Eye"	3	3	3
2016-10-08	Epik High feat. Lee Hi	"Can You Hear My Heart"	14	3	3
2016-10-15	Got7	"Hard Carry"	2	6	7
2016-10-22	Shinee	"1 of 1"	3	3	3
2016-10-22	Amber and Luna feat. Ferry Corsten & Kago Pengchi	"Heartbeat"	6	1	1
2016-10-22	Monsta X	"Fighter"	8	2	2
2016-10-22	Ailee feat. Yoon Mi-rae	"Home"	10	3	3
2016-10-22	Lee Hi	"My Love"	22	1	1
2016-10-29	BTS	"Blood Sweat & Tears"	1	98	118
2016-10-29	BTS	"Lie" (Jimin solo)	2	3	8
2016-10-29	BTS	"Begin" (Jungkook solo)	1 (Note: Peaked at No. 1 on 2021-08-21 (1 week))	1	3
2016-10-29	BTS	"Awake" (Jin solo)	6	2	2
2016-10-29	BTS	"BTS Cypher 4"	6	1	3
2016-10-29	BTS	"Intro: Boy Meets Evil"	9	1	1
2016-10-29	BTS	"Stigma" (V solo)	1 (Note: Peaked at No. 1 on 2021-06-12 (1 week))	1	3 (R) 5
2016-10-29	BTS	"Lost"	11	1	1
2016-10-29	BTS	"21st Century Girls"	3	5	7
2016-10-29	BTS	"MAMA" (J-Hope solo)	13	1	1
2016-10-29	BTS	"Am I Wrong"	9	2	2
2016-10-29	BTS	"First Love" (Suga solo)	8	1	2
2016-10-29	Alesso and Chen	"Years"	20	1	1
2016-10-29	BTS	"Interlude: Wings"	24	1	1
2016-11-05	I.O.I	"Very Very Very"	4	3	3
2016-11-05	Ladies' Code	"The Rain"	25	1	1
2016-11-12	Twice	"TT"	2	14	16
2016-11-12	Jay Park feat. Gray	"Drive"	8	1	1
2016-11-12	Jay Park feat. Hoody & Loco	"All I Wanna Do"	9	5	5
2016-11-19	Blackpink	"Playing with Fire"	1	14	14
2016-11-19	Blackpink	"Stay"	4	4	4
2016-11-19	Taeyeon	"11:11"	5	3	3
2016-11-19	Exo-CBX	"Hey Mama!"	7	4	4
2016-11-19	VIXX	"The Closer"	14	1	1
2016-11-19	Bastarz	"Make It Rain"	15	2	2
2016-11-26	B.A.P	"Skydive"	9	2	2
2016-11-26	Mamamoo	"Décalcomanie"	12	1	1
2016-12-03	Shinee	"Tell Me What To Do"	3	3	3
2016-12-03	Shinee	"Rescue"	9	1	1
2016-12-03	Shinee	"If You Love Her"	11	1	1
2016-12-03	Shinee	"Beautiful Life"	12	1	1
2016-12-03	Shinee	"Wish Upon A Star"	16	1	1
2016-12-17	Zico feat. Crush & Dean	"Bermuda Triangle"	3	6	6
2016-12-17	B1A4	"A Lie"	16	1	1
2016-12-24	Chanyeol & Punch	"Stay with Me"	3	3	10
2016-12-24	Seventeen	"BOOMBOOM"	5	4	4
2016-12-24	Hyoyeon	"Mystery"	12	1	1
2016-12-31	BigBang	"Fxxk It"	2	10	10
2016-12-31	BigBang	"Last Dance"	3	4	4
2016-12-31	BigBang	"Girlfriend"	4	2	2
2016-12-31	Kard feat. Heo Young-ji	"Oh NaNa"	5	5	8
2016-12-31	Jonghyun	"Inspiration"	19	1	1
2016-12-31	Jessica Jung	"Wonderland"	23	1	1
2017-01-07	Exo	"For Life"	8	1	1
2017-01-07	Crush	"Beautiful"	7	1	7
2017-01-07	Exo	"Twenty Four"	12	1	1
2017-01-07	Exo	"Falling For You"	14	1	1
2017-01-07	Exo	"What I Want For Christmas"	19	1	1
2017-01-07	Exo	"Winter Heat"	20	1	1
2017-01-21	AOA	"Excuse Me"	6	2	2
2017-01-21	Seventeen	"Highlight"	8	2	2
2017-01-21	AOA	"Bing Bing"	15	1	1
2017-01-28	Day6	"I Wait"	3	2	3
2017-01-28	NCT 127	"Limitless"	4	2	2
2017-01-28	Day6	"Goodbye Winter"	6	1	1
2017-02-04	CLC	"Hobgoblin"	4	3	3
2017-02-04	V & Jin	It's Definitely You	8	3	6
2017-02-04	Seohyun	"Don't Say No"	18	1	1
2017-02-04	Rain	"The Best Present"	22	1	1
2017-02-11	2NE1	"Goodbye"	1	3	3
2017-02-11	Heize feat. Han Soo-ji	"Round and Round"	4	3	3
2017-02-11	Ailee	"I Will Go to You Like the First Snow"	10	1	1
2017-02-11	Soyou	"I Miss You"	11	1	1
2017-02-11	Sam Kim	"Who Are You"	15	1	1
2017-02-11	Kim Kyung-hee	"And I'm Here"	18	1	1
2017-02-18	Red Velvet	"Rookie"	4	4	4
2017-02-25	Day6	"You Were Beautiful"	3	2	2
2017-02-25	Block B	"Yesterday"	5	2	2
2017-02-25	Day6	"My Day"	6	1	1
2017-02-25	Suho & Song Young-joo	"Curtain"	16	1	1
2017-02-25	NCT Dream	"My First and Last"	11	2	2
2017-03-04	BTS	"Spring Day"	1 (Total 2 weeks) (Note: Entered at No. 1 (1 week); peaked on 2023-12-23 (1 week))	34	64
2017-03-04	BTS	"Not Today"	1 (Total 2 weeks) (Note: 2017-03-11 (1 week), 2024-05-18 (1 week))	38	62
2017-03-04	BTS	"A Supplementary Story: You Never Walk Alone"	3	3	4
2017-03-04	BTS	"Outro: Wings"	4	3	3
2017-03-04	Kard	"Don't Recall"	5	8	12
2017-03-11	Twice	"Knock Knock"	5	5	5
2017-03-11	DEAN feat. Baek Ye-rin	"Come Over"	8	1	1
2017-03-11	DEAN	"The Unknown Guest"	13	1	1
2017-03-11	Twice	"Ice Cream"	18	1	1
2017-03-18	Taeyeon	"Fine"	7	2	2
2017-03-18	Taeyeon	"I Got Love"	9	1	1
2017-03-25	Day6	"How Can I Say"	3	2	2
2017-03-25	B.A.P	"Wake Me Up"	4	2	2
2017-03-25	Day6	"I Would"	9	1	1
2017-03-25	B.A.P	"Dystopia"	10	1	1
2017-03-25	B.A.P	"Diamond 4 Ya"	11	1	1
2017-03-25	GFriend	"Fingertip"	13	2	2
2017-03-25	BtoB	"Movie"	25	1	1
2017-04-01	Got7	"Never Ever"	3	7	7
2017-04-01	Got7	"Paradise"	23	1	1
2017-04-08	Monsta X	"Beautiful"	4	5	5
2017-04-08	Pristin	"Wee Woo"	11	2	2
2017-04-08	Highlight	"Plz Don't Be Sad"	22	1	1
2017-04-15	BgA (*K-pop parody group)	"Who's It Gonna Be"	3	1	1
2017-04-15	Girl's Day	"I'll Be Yours"	11	1	1
2017-04-15	IU	"Through the Night"	16	1	1
2017-04-22	Winner	"Really Really"	3	6	7
2017-04-22	Winner	"Fool"	4	2	2
2017-04-22	Day6	"I'm Serious"	5	2	2
2017-04-22	Day6	"Say Wow"	10	1	1
2017-04-22	Taeyeon	"Make Me Love You"	11	1	1
2017-04-29	Ten	"Dream in a Dream"	5	2	2
2017-04-29	Dreamcatcher	"Good Night"	23	1	1
2017-05-06	Zico	"She's a Baby"	4	1	1
2017-05-06	Baekhyun	"Take You Home"	5	1	1
2017-05-06	Minzy feat. Flowsik	"Ni Na No"	18	1	1
2017-05-13	Kard	"Rumor"	3	4	4
2017-05-13	IU feat. G-Dragon	"Palette"	4	3	3
2017-05-13	Suran feat. Changmo	"Wine"	5	2	2
2017-05-20	Triple H	"365 Fresh"	7	2	2
2017-05-27	Day6	"Dance Dance"	6	2	2
2017-05-27	Day6	"Man In A Movie"	8	1	1
2017-05-27	Psy	"I Luv It"	4	3	3
2017-06-03	Twice	"Signal"	3	7	7
2017-06-03	Psy	"New Face"	5	2	2
2017-06-03	VIXX	"Shangri-La"	6	3	3
2017-06-03	Unnies	"Right?"	10	1	1
2017-06-03	Unnies	"LaLaLa Song"	22	1	1
2017-06-10	Seventeen	"Don't Wanna Cry"	3	8	8
2017-06-10	iKON	"Bling Bling"	5	3	3
2017-06-10	iKON	"B-Day"	10	1	1
2017-06-17	Sistar	"Lonely"	6	2	2
2017-06-17	Sistar	"For You"	18	1	1
2017-06-17	A.C.E	"Cactus"	21	1	1
2017-06-24	Hyoyeon feat. San E	"Wannabe"	8	1	1
2017-06-24	Day6	"I Smile"	9	2	2
2017-06-24	G-Dragon	"Untitled, 2014"	4	3	3
2017-06-24	ASTRO	"Baby"	24	1	1
2017-06-24	Day6	"Lean On Me"	25	1	1
2017-07-01	NCT 127	"Cherry Bomb"	3	6	6
2017-07-01	G-Dragon	"Bullshit"	10	1	1
2017-07-01	Daehyun feat. Zelo	"Shadow"	12	1	1
2017-07-01	Jongup	"Try My Luck"	19	1	1
2017-07-08	Blackpink	"As If It's Your Last"	1 (Total 3 weeks) (Note: Entered at No. 1 for 3 weeks)	20	27
2017-07-08	Monsta X	"Shine Forever"	4	2	2
2017-07-08	Monsta X	"Gravity"	7	1	1
2017-07-08	Produce 101 Season 2 contestants	"Hands on Me"	25	1	1
2017-07-15	Mamamoo	"Yes I Am"	7	1	1
2017-07-15	BoA	"Camo"	11	2	2
2017-07-22	BTS	"Come Back Home"	2	9	10
2017-07-22	Day6	"Hi Hello"	9	2	2
2017-07-22	Hyolyn & Kisum	"Fruity"	18	1	1
2017-07-22	Day6	"Be Lazy"	19	2	2
2017-07-29	Red Velvet	"Red Flavor"	4	4	4
2017-07-29	Xiumin & Mark Lee	"Young & Free"	6	1	1
2017-07-29	One	"Heyahe"	17	1	1
2017-08-05	Exo	"Ko Ko Bop"	2	13	13
2017-08-05	Kard	"Hola Hola"	4	3	3
2017-08-05	Exo	"The Eve"	5	9	9
2017-08-05	Jessi	"Gucci"	9	1	1
2017-08-05	Kard	"I Won't Stop"	10	1	1
2017-08-05	Kard	"Living Good (Special thanks to)"	12	1	1
2017-08-05	Exo	"Forever"	24	1	1
2017-08-12	Akdong Musician	"Dinosaur"	9	1	1
2017-08-12	Monsta X	"Newton"	8	2	2
2017-08-12	Nu'est W	"If You"	23	1	1
2017-08-19	JJ Project	"Tomorrow, Today"	9	1	1
2017-08-26	Winner	"Island"	3	2	2
2017-08-26	Winner	"Love Me Love Me"	4	1	1
2017-08-26	Girls' Generation	"All Night"	5	2	2
2017-08-26	Girls' Generation	"Holiday"	6	2	2
2017-08-26	Day6	"What Can I Do"	9	2	2
2017-08-26	Wanna One	"Energetic"	6	4	4
2017-08-26	The Rose	"Sorry"	14	1	1
2017-08-26	Day6	"Whatever!"	15	1	1
2017-09-02	Taeyang	"Wake Me Up"	5	2	2
2017-09-09	Sunmi	"Gashina"	3	13	15
2017-09-09	NCT Dream	"We Young"	11	1	1
2017-09-09	Red Velvet	"Rebirth"	25	1	1
2017-09-16	VIXX LR	"Whisper"	9	1	1
2017-09-16	HyunA	"Babe"	10	2	2
2017-09-23	Exo	"Power"	3	6	7
2017-09-23	B.A.P	"Honeymoon"	4	2	2
2017-09-23	Exo	"Sweet Lies"	5	2	2
2017-09-23	Day6	"I Loved You"	6	2	2
2017-09-23	B.A.P	"Rewind"	7	1	1
2017-09-23	B.A.P	"All the Way Up"	8	1	1
2017-09-23	Day6	"I'll Remember"	10	1	1
2017-09-23	Exo	"Boomerang"	11	1	1
2017-09-30	Yoona	"When The Wind Blows"	8	1	1
2017-10-07	BTS	"DNA"	1 (Total 3 weeks) (Note: Entered at No. 1 for 2 weeks, returned to No. 1 on 2017-12-09 (1 week))	28	78
2017-10-07	BTS	"Intro: Serendipity"	2	11	11
2017-10-07	BTS	"Best of Me"	3	6	15
2017-10-07	BTS	"Dimple"	4	4	6
2017-10-07	BTS	"Go Go"	3	31	38
2017-10-07	BTS feat. Desiigner	"MIC Drop" (Steve Aoki remix)	1 (Total 13 weeks) (Note: Entered at No. 1 on 2017-12-16 (13 weeks))	96	163 (R) 164
2017-10-07	BTS	"Pied Piper"	8	4	8
2017-10-07	BTS	"Outro: Her"	10	1	2
2017-10-07	Bobby	"I Love You"	14	1	1
2017-10-21	Day6	"When You Love Someone"	5	1	1
2017-10-21	Day6	"I Need Somebody"	7	1	1
2017-10-28	Got7	"You Are"	4	4	4
2017-11-04	Taemin	"Move"	4	4	4
2017-11-04	SF9	"O Sole Mio"	7	2	2
2017-11-04	Got7	"Teenager"	14	1	1
2017-11-04	UP10TION	"Going Crazy"	22	1	1
2017-11-04	BtoB	"Missing You"	23	1	1
2017-11-11	JBJ	"Fantasy"	14	1	1
2017-11-11	Twice	One More Time	8	2	2
2017-11-18	Twice	"Likey"	1 (Total 2 weeks)	16	16
2017-11-18	Stray Kids	"Hellevator"	6	2	3
2017-11-18	ASTRO	"Crazy Sexy Cool"	11	3	3
2017-11-18	Loona	"Sweet Crazy Love"	15	1	1
2017-11-18	Playback	"Want You To Say"	23	1	1
2017-11-25	Seventeen	"Clap"	4	4	5
2017-11-25	EXID	"DDD"	6	4	4
2017-11-25	Monsta X	"Dramarama"	7	4	4
2017-11-25	Super Junior	"Black Suit"	8	3	3
2017-11-25	Day6	"All Alone"	11	1	1
2017-11-25	Seventeen	"Change Up"	12	1	1
2017-11-25	Block B	"Shall We Dance"	5	2	2
2017-11-25	Seventeen	"Trauma"	15	1	1
2017-11-25	Day6	"Pouring"	17	1	1
2017-11-25	Seventeen	"Lilili Yabbay"	20	1	1
2017-11-25	10 cm & Chen	"Bye Babe"	24	1	1
2017-12-02	Wanna One	"Beautiful"	15	2	2
2017-12-02	Taemin	"Thirsty"	23	1	1
2017-12-08	Red Velvet	"Peek-a-Boo"	2	8	10
2017-12-09	Kard	"You In Me"	11	2	2
2017-12-23	BTS	"Crystal Snow"	2	5	6
2017-12-23	HyunA	"Lip & Hip"	5	3	3
2017-12-23	Day6	"I Like You"	18	1	1
2017-12-30	Twice	"Heart Shaker"	2	6	6
2017-12-30	B.A.P	"Hands Up"	7	1	1
2017-12-30	Twice	"Merry & Happy"	12	1	1
2017-12-30	B.A.P	"Think Hole"	16	1	1
2017-12-30	B.A.P	"Moondance"	17	1	1
2018-01-03	Jonghyun feat. Taeyeon	"Lonely"	6	1	1
2018-01-13	Exo	"Universe"	16	1	1
2018-01-20	Amber and Luna	"Lower"	4	1	1
2018-01-20	Momoland	"Bboom Bboom"	4	7	23
2018-01-20	Infinite	"Tell Me"	19	1	1
2018-01-20	DEAN	"Instagram"	20	1	1
2018-01-20	Mamamoo	"Paint Me"	22	1	1
2018-01-27	Sunmi	"Heroine"	3	3	3
2018-01-27	Dreamcatcher	"Full Moon"	16	1	1
2018-02-03	Jonghyun	"Shinin'"	9	2	2
2018-02-03	Chung Ha	"Roller Coaster"	19	1	1
2018-02-10	Red Velvet	"Bad Boy"	2	9	13
2018-02-10	iKON	"Love Scenario"	4	6	8
2018-02-10	Exo	"Electric Kiss"	5	3	3
2018-02-17	Seventeen	"Thanks"	4	3	3
2018-02-17	Henry Lau	"Monster"	9	1	1
2018-02-17	BoA	"NEGA DOLA"	25	1	1
2018-03-03	Agust D	"Give It To Me"	4	2	2
2018-03-03	Agust D feat. Suran	"So Far Away"	19	2	2
2018-03-03	Agust D	"The Last"	1 (Note: Peaked at No. 1 on 2024-09-07 (1 week))	2	23
2018-03-10	J-Hope	"Daydream"	1	6	6
2018-03-10	CLC	"Black Dress"	5	1	1
2018-03-10	Got7 feat. Hyolyn	"One And Only You"	6	3	3
2018-03-10	J-Hope	"Hope World"	5	2	3
2018-03-10	Agust D feat. Yankie	"Tony Montana"	22	1	1
2018-03-10	J-Hope feat. Supreme Boi	"Hangsang"	11	2	2
2018-03-17	J-Hope	"Airplane"	5	2	2
2018-03-17	J-Hope	"Base Line"	8	1	1
2018-03-17	iKON	"Rubber Band"	10	2	2
2018-03-17	J-Hope	"P.O.P (Piece Of Peace), Pt. 1"	5	1	1
2018-03-17	Mamamoo	"Starry Night"	8	3	3
2018-03-24	BigBang	"Flower Road"	1	3	3
2018-03-24	Got7	"Look"	3	4	4
2018-03-24	NCT U	"Baby Don't Stop"	2	5	5
2018-03-24	NCT U	"Boss"	3	5	6
2018-03-24	Suho and Jang Jane	"Dinner"	11	1	1
2018-03-24	NCT 127	"Touch"	11	3	3
2018-03-24	NCT Dream	"Go"	18	2	2
2018-04-07	Monsta X	"Jealousy"	4	4	4
2018-04-07	Stray Kids	"District 9"	10	2	2
2018-04-07	BSS	"Just Do It"	17	1	1
2018-04-14	BTS	"Don't Leave Me"	1 (Total 2 weeks)	9	9
2018-04-14	BTS	"Let Go"	2	8	8
2018-04-14	BTS	"Intro: Ringwanderung"	4	2	2
2018-04-14	BTS	"Outro: Crack"	5	1	1
2018-04-14	Loona feat. JinSoul	"Egoist"	9	1	1
2018-04-14	Pentagon	"Shine"	6	21	21
2018-04-14	EXID	"Lady"	9	2	2
2018-04-14	Loona (Go Won & Olivia Hye feat. HeeJin)	"Rosy"	22	1	1
2018-04-21	Twice	"What Is Love?"	3	6	6
2018-04-21	Ten	"New Heroes"	4	2	2
2018-04-21	Exo-CBX	"Blooming Day"	8	3	3
2018-04-21	Winner	"Everyday"	10	1	1
2018-04-28	Super Junior feat. Leslie Grace & Play-N-Skillz	"Lo Siento"	2	3	3
2018-04-28	VIXX	"Scentist"	6	3	3
2018-04-28	The Rose	"Baby"	14	2	2
2018-04-28	Hyoyeon feat. Ummet Ozcan	"Sober"	15	2	2
2018-05-05	Hyolyn feat. Gray	"Dally"	6	4	4
2018-05-12	(G)I-dle	"Latata"	4	5	5
2018-05-12	GFriend	"Time for the Moon Night"	17	1	1
2018-05-26	Dreamcatcher	"You and I"	9	1	1
2018-06-02	BTS	"Fake Love"	1 (Total 6 weeks) (Note: Entered at No. 1 for 4 weeks, returned to No. 1 on 2018-10-27 (1 week), 2024-03-09 (1 week))	64	71
2018-06-02	BTS feat. Steve Aoki	"The Truth Untold"	2	6	8
2018-06-02	BTS	"Intro: Singularity"	3	3	3
2018-06-02	BTS	"Airplane pt. 2"	4	11	17
2018-06-02	BTS	"Anpanman"	1 (Note: Peaked at No. 1 on 2025-12-20 (1 week))	13	17
2018-06-02	BTS	"Magic Shop"	3	4	7
2018-06-02	BTS	"Love Maze"	7	2	2
2018-06-02	BTS	"Paradise"	8	2	2
2018-06-02	BTS	"So What"	9	2	2
2018-06-02	BTS	"Outro: Tear"	2	1	4
2018-06-02	BTS	"134340"	11	1	1
2018-06-09	Pristin V	"Get It"	6	3	3
2018-06-09	Shinee	"Good Evening"	8	3	3
2018-06-09	Pristin V	"Spotlight"	19	1	1
2018-06-16	Seventeen	"Call Call Call!"	16	1	1
2018-06-23	Shinee	"I Want You"	10	2	2
2018-06-30	Blackpink	"Ddu-Du Ddu-Du"	1	57	93
2018-06-30	Blackpink	"Forever Young"	4	3	4
2018-06-30	Blackpink	"Really"	11	1	1
2018-06-30	Blackpink	"See U Later"	12	1	1
2018-06-30	Twice	"I Want You Back"	20	1	1
2018-06-30	Taeyeon	"Something New"	24	1	1
2018-07-07	Momoland	"Baam"	5	6	12
2018-07-07	Day6	"Shoot Me"	8	3	3
2018-07-07	Shinee	"Our Page"	16	1	1
2018-07-14	Taeyeon	"Stay"	13	1	1
2018-07-14	Apink	"I'm So Sick"	8	3	3
2018-07-14	Taeyeon	"I'm The Greatest"	18	1	1
2018-07-21	Twice	"Dance The Night Away"	2	7	7
2018-07-21	Twice	"Chillax"	9e	1	1
2018-07-21	Twice	"Shot Thru The Heart"	12	1	1
2018-07-21	Red Velvet	"#Cookie Jar"	20	1	1
2018-07-28	Mamamoo	"Egotistic"	4	5	5
2018-07-28	Seventeen	"Oh My!"	6	4	4
2018-07-28	Triple H	"Retro Future"	16	2	2
2018-08-04	Hyolyn	"See Sea"	5	2	2
2018-08-04	Seungri	"1, 2, 3!"	11	1	1
2018-08-11	iKON	"Killing Me"	2	7	7
2018-08-11	SF9	"Now or Never"	14	2	2
2018-08-11	Kard	"Ride On the Wind"	19	1	1
2018-08-18	Loona	"Favorite"	4	1	1
2018-08-18	Red Velvet	"Power Up"	6	3	3
2018-08-18	Stray Kids	"My Pace"	8	3	3
2018-08-25	(G)I-dle	"Hann (Alone)"	2	3	3
2018-09-01	Loona	"Hi High"	11	1	1
2018-09-01	Hyolyn	"Bae"	22	1	1
2018-09-01	Super Junior-D&E	"Bout You"	24	1	1
2018-09-08	BTS feat. Nicki Minaj	"Idol"	1 (Total 6 weeks) (Note: Entered at No. 1 for 6 weeks)	52	56
2018-09-08	BTS	"Euphoria" (Jungkook solo)	1 (Note: Peaked at No. 1 on 2021-07-17 (1 week))	10	92
2018-09-08	BTS	"I'm Fine"	3	13	13
2018-09-08	BTS	"Epiphany" (Jin solo)	4	7	9
2018-09-08	BTS	"Trivia: Seesaw" (Suga solo)	5	9	9
2018-09-08	BTS	"Answer: Love Myself"	6	7	7
2018-09-08	BTS	"Trivia: Just Dance" (J-Hope solo)	7	5	5
2018-09-08	BTS	"Serendipity" (full length edition) (Jimin solo)	5	10	12
2018-09-08	BTS	"Trivia: Love" (RM solo)	9	4	4
2018-09-08	BTS	"Singularity" (V solo)	1 (Note: 2021-05-08 (1 week))	1	5
2018-09-15	Baekhyun & Loco	"Young"	4	1	1
2018-09-15	Oh!GG	"Lil' Touch"	3	4	4
2018-09-15	NCT Dream	"We Go Up"	11	2	2
2018-09-15	Oh!GG	"Fermata"	22	1	1
2018-09-22	Shinee	"Countless"	4	1	1
2018-09-22	Sunmi	"Siren"	5	4	4
2018-09-22	Pentagon	"Naughty Boy"	7	3	3
2018-09-22	Jay Park	"V"	19	1	1
2018-09-22	Jay Park	"Dank"	24	1	1
2018-09-22	Day6	"Beautiful Feeling"	25	1	1
2018-09-29	Got7	"Lullaby"	2	5	5
2018-09-29	Chanyeol & Sehun	"We Young"	3	1	1
2018-09-29	Got7	"Sunrise"	22	1	1
2018-09-29	Dreamcatcher	"What"	8	1	1
2018-10-13	Seulgi, SinB, Chung Ha, Soyeon	"Wow Thing"	3	2	2
2018-10-13	iKON	"Goodbye Road"	20	1	1
2018-10-20	Super Junior & Reik	"One More Time"	4	2	2
2018-10-20	IU	"Bbibbi"	5	6	6
2018-10-20	The Rose	"She's in the Rain"	13	1	1
2018-10-20	Yuri	"Into You"	22	1	1
2018-10-27	NCT 127	"Regular"	2	10	10
2018-10-27	Weki Meki	"Crush"	14	1	1
2018-10-27	Fromis 9	"Love Bomb"	22	1	1
2018-10-03	RM	"Seoul"	5	2	2
2018-10-03	RM	"Forever Rain"	6	1	1
2018-10-03	RM	"Moonchild"	8	1	1
2018-10-03	Monsta X	"Shoot Out"	6	5	5
2018-10-03	RM feat. Nell	"Everythingoes"	12	1	1
2018-10-03	RM	"Uhgood"	13	1	1
2018-10-03	RM feat. eAeon	"Badbye"	14	1	1
2018-10-03	Stray Kids	"I Am You"	19	1	1
2018-11-10	Iz*One	"La Vie en Rose"	6	3	3
2018-11-17	K/DA feat. Miyeon & Soyeon, Madison Beer, & Jaira Burns	"Pop/Stars"	1	23	30
2018-11-17	Exo	"Tempo"	2	9	9
2018-11-17	Twice	"Yes or Yes"	5	8	8
2018-11-17	Exo	"Ooh La La La"	15	1	1
2018-11-17	Key feat. Soyou	"Forever Yours"	14	1	1
2018-11-17	Exo	"Oasis"	19	1	1
2018-11-17	Exo	"Gravity"	21	1	1
2018-11-17	Twice	"BDZ"	23	1	1
2018-11-24	BTS	"2! 3!"	1	1	3
2018-11-24	Jennie	"Solo"	1 (Note: 2018-12-01 (1 week))	18	26
2018-11-24	Tiger JK feat. RM	"Timeless"	4	1	1
2018-11-24	Hyoyeon & 3lau	"Punk Right Now"	16	1	1
2018-11-24	DEAN feat. Sulli, Rad Museum	"Dayfly"	17	1	1
2018-11-24	EXID	"I Love You"	5	5	5
2018-12-08	NCT 127	"Simon Says"	1	4	4
2018-12-08	Mino	"Fiancé"	6	2	2
2018-12-08	NCT 127	"Welcome to My Playground"	7	1	1
2018-12-08	Key feat. Crush	"One of Those Nights"	20	1	1
2018-12-08	Yubin	"Thank U Soooo Much"	21	1	1
2018-12-15	Red Velvet	"RBB (Really Bad Boy)"	1	4	7
2018-12-15	Got7	"Miracle"	4	2	2
2018-12-15	Got7	"Take Me to You"	14	1	1
2018-12-15	Mamamoo	"Wind Flower"	16	1	1
2018-12-15	Got7	"1:31 AM"	18	1	1
2018-12-15	Got7	"Come On"	19	1	1
2018-12-15	Got7	"Think About It"	24	1	1
2018-12-22	Exo	"Love Shot"	1 (Total 3 weeks)	11	11
2018-12-22	Exo	"Trauma"	8	1	1
2018-12-22	Exo	"Wait"	14	1	1
2018-12-22	Twice	"The Best Thing I Ever Did"	15	2	2
2018-12-22	Day6	"Days Gone By"	25	1	1
2018-12-29	Winner	"Millions"	5	2	
2019-01-12	Chung Ha	"Gotta Go"	6	3	4
2019-01-19	IKON	"I'm OK"	2	2	2
2019-01-19	Apink	"%% (Eung Eung)"	8	2	2
2019-01-19	Red Velvet	"Sappy"	13	1	1
2019-01-19	Luna	"Even So"	22	1	1
2019-01-19	Luna	"Do You Love Me"	23	1	1
2019-01-26	Oneus	"Valkyrie"	15	1	1
2019-01-26	ASTRO	"All Night"	6	3	3
2019-01-26	Ateez	"Say My Name"	8	4	5
2019-01-26	GFriend	"Sunrise"	25	1	1
2019-02-02	Lee So-ra feat. Suga	"Song Request"	2	2	2
2019-02-02	Seventeen	"Getting Closer"	5	1	1
2019-02-02	Seventeen	"Home"	7	3	3
2019-02-02	Cherry Bullet	"Q&A"	17	1	1
2019-02-02	Bang Yongguk	"Hikikomori"	19	1	1
2019-02-09	CLC	"No"	4	3	3
2019-02-16	VIXX	"Walking"	17	1	1
2019-02-23	Itzy	"Dalla Dalla"	2	7	8
2019-02-23	Hwasa	"Twit"	3	6	6
2019-02-23	Taemin	"Want"	5	3	4
2019-02-23	Itzy	"Want It?"	8	2	2
2019-02-23	Dreamcatcher	"Piri"	12	2	2
2019-03-02	Monsta X	"Alligator"	5	2	2
2019-03-02	Loona	"Butterfly"	6	3	3
2019-03-09	(G)I-dle	"Senorita"	7	2	2
2019-03-16	TXT	"Crown"	1	5	5
2019-03-16	Sunmi	"Noir"	3	3	3
2019-03-16	TXT	"Blue Orangeade"	10	1	1
2019-03-16	Key feat. Soyeon	"I Wanna Be"	13	1	1
2019-03-16	TXT	"Cat & Dog"	14	1	1
2019-03-16	TXT	"Our Summer"	17	1	1
2019-03-16	Jus2	"Focus On Me"	23	2	2
2019-03-23	Park Bom	"Spring" feat. Sandara Park	2	2	2
2019-03-23	Park Bom	"Shameful"	4	2	
2019-03-23	Park Bom	"My Lover"	5	2	2
2019-03-23	Mamamoo	"gogobebe"	2	5	5
2019-03-23	Epik High	"Eternal Sunshine"	13	1	1
2019-03-30	Everglow	"Bon Bon Chocolat"	5	4	4
2019-03-30	Momoland	"I'm So Hot"	13	2	2
2019-04-06	Stray Kids	"Miroh"	2	3	3
2019-04-06	Kard	"Bomb Bomb"	3	3	3
2019-04-06	Taeyeon	"Four Seasons"	6	1	1
2019-04-06	Taeyeon	"Blue"	7	1	1
2019-04-06	Minho	"I'm Home"	12	2	2
2019-04-06	Pentagon	"Sha La La"	15	2	2
2019-04-06	Jus2	"Take"	25	1	1
2019-04-13	Blackpink	"Kill This Love"	1 (Note: 2019-04-20 (1 week))	47	87
2019-04-13	Iz*One	"Violeta"	8	1	1
2019-04-20	Blackpink	"Don't Know What to Do"	4	5	5
2019-04-20	Blackpink	"Kick It"	8	2	2
2019-04-20	Blackpink	"Hope Not"	9	1	1
2019-04-27	BTS feat. Halsey	"Boy with Luv"	1 (Total 8 weeks) (Note: Entered at No. 1 for 8 weeks)	30	89
2019-04-27	BTS; BTS feat Lauv	"Make It Right" "Make It Right remix"	2; 1 (Total 3 weeks) (Note: Entered at No. 1 for 1 week, returned to No. 1 on 2019-11-16 (2 weeks))	3; 21	30
2019-04-27	BTS	"Mikrokosmos"	3	8	12
2019-04-27	BTS	"Home"	1 (Note: Peaked at No. 1 on 2025-07-05 (1 week))	4	7
2019-04-27	BTS	"Dionysus"	5	8	10
2019-04-27	BTS	"Jamais Vu"	6	3	5
2019-04-27	BTS	"Intro: Persona"	2	3	6
2019-05-04	Twice	"Fancy"	4	13	23
2019-05-25	EXID	"Me & You"	15	2	2
2019-06-01	Got7	"Eclipse"	13	2	2
2019-06-01	A.C.E	"Under Cover"	23	1	1
2019-06-08	NCT 127	"Superhuman"	3	2	2
2019-06-08	Hyolyn	"youknowbetter"	23	1	1
2019-06-15	NCT Dream and HRVY	"Don't Need Your Love"	4	3	3
2019-06-15	Lee Hi feat. B.I	"No One"	6	1	1
2019-06-22	BTS and Charli XCX	"Dream Glow"	1	6	6
2019-06-22	Jeon So-mi	"Birthday"	5	3	3
2019-06-22	Jeon So-mi	"Outta My Head"	9	2	2
2019-06-22	Ateez	"Wave"	17	1	1
2019-06-22	Ateez	"Illusion"	23	1	1
2019-06-29	BTS and Zara Larsson	"A Brand New Day"	1	5	5
2019-06-29	Red Velvet	"Zimzalabim"	10	2	2
2019-06-29	Stray Kids	"Side Effects"	13	3	3
2019-07-06	BTS and Juice Wrld	"All Night"	1	3	3
2019-07-06	(G)I-dle	"Uh-Oh"	7	3	3
2019-07-06	Chung Ha	"Snapping"	9	4	4
2019-07-13	BTS	"Heartbeat"	1	7	7
2019-07-13	BTS	"Lights"	1 (Total 2 weeks) (Note: 2019-07-20 (1 week), 2025-09-20 (1 week))	11	14
2019-07-13	BTS performed by Lee Hyun	"You Are Here"	9	1	1
2019-07-13	D.O.	"That's Okay"	11	2	2
2019-07-13	Okdal	"LaLaLa"	16	1	1
2019-07-20	Heize feat. Giriboy	"We Don't Talk Together"	4	2	2
2019-07-20	Ailee	"Room Shaker"	22	1	1
2019-07-27	Taeyong	"Long Flight"	6	2	2
2019-07-27	NCT 127	"Highway to Heaven"	5	4	6
2019-07-27	NCT Dream	"Fireflies"	11	1	1
2019-07-27	BTS	"Cypher Pt. 2: Triptych"	17	2	3
2019-07-27	Baekhyun	"UN Village"	23	1	1
2019-08-03	BTS feat. Supreme Boi	"BTS Cypher Pt. 3: Killer"	3	1	3
2019-08-03	Mamamoo	"Gleam"	15	2	2
2019-08-10	NCT Dream	"Boom"	6	5	5
2019-08-10	Itzy	"Icy"	7	7	7
2019-08-10	The Rose's Woosung	"Face"	21	1	1
2019-08-10	Itzy	"Cherry"	23	1	1
2019-08-17	Seventeen	"Hit"	4	3	3
2019-08-24	The Rose	"Red"	7	2	2
2019-08-24	Jinu feat. Mino	"Call Anytime"	14	1	1
2019-08-31	Everglow	"Adios"	2	6	6
2019-08-31	Everglow	"Hush"	9	1	1
2019-08-31	Red Velvet	"Umpah Umpah"	9	3	3
2019-08-31	Everglow	"You Don't Know Me"	11	1	1
2019-09-07	Sunmi	"Lalalay"	4	3	3
2019-09-07	X1	"Flash"	15	3	3
2019-09-07	Punch	"Done for Me"	22	1	1
2019-09-14	Wheein	"Good Bye"	24	1	1
2019-09-28	Seventeen	"Fear"	6	3	3
2019-09-28	Mamamoo	"Good Luck"	12	1	1
2019-09-28	Park Bom feat. Cheetah	"Hann"	13	1	1
2019-09-28	AOA	"Egotistic"	14	1	1
2019-09-28	Dreamcatcher	"Deja Vu"	12	2	2
2019-10-05	Twice	"Feel Special"	1	7	12
2019-10-05	Kard	"Dumb Litty"	3	4	4
2019-10-05	Jessi	"Who Dat B"	8	2	2
2019-10-05	VIXX	"Parallel"	10	1	1
2019-10-05	Twice	"Breakthrough"	11	1	1
2019-10-12	J-Hope feat. Becky G	"Chicken Noodle Soup"	1	9	15
2019-10-12	Oneus	"Lit"	14	2	2
2019-10-19	SuperM	"Jopping"	1	5	6
2019-10-19	Stray Kids	"Double Knot"	4	3	5
2019-10-19	Ateez	"Wonderland"	6	5	6
2019-10-19	SuperM	"I Can't Stand the Rain"	10	1	1
2019-10-19	SuperM	"Super Car"	15	1	1
2019-10-19	SuperM	"No Manners"	20	1	1
2019-10-19	SuperM	"2 Fast"	24	1	
2019-10-26	Sulli	"Goblin"	14	1	1
2019-10-26	Super Junior	"I Think I"	19	1	1
2019-11-02	TXT	"9 and Three Quarters (Run Away)"	2	4	5 (R) 6
2019-11-02	AleXa	"Bomb"	7	2	2
2019-11-02	TXT	"New Rules"	16	1	1
2019-11-02	TXT	"20cm"	18	1	1
2019-11-02	Super Junior	"SUPER Clap"	20	1	1
2019-11-02	TXT	"Angel or Devil"	21	1	1
2019-11-02	Wengie feat. Minnie	"Empire"	22	1	1
2019-11-09	Monsta X	"Follow"	5	2	2
2019-11-09	Mamamoo	"Destiny"	7	1	2
2019-11-09	(G)I-dle	"Lion"	5	4	4
2019-11-09	Park Bom	"Wanna Go Back"	18	1	1
2019-11-09	Monsta X	"Find You"	21	1	1
2019-11-09	Taeyeon	"Spark"	25	1	1
2019-11-16	Got7	"You Calling My Name"	3	6	7
2019-11-16	HyunA	"Flower Shower"	6	3	3
2019-11-16	IU	"Love Poem"	9	1	1
2019-11-16	Dawn	"Money"	11	2	2
2019-11-16	Jessi and Jay Par	"Drip"	16	1	1
2019-11-16	Hinipia	"Drip"	18	1	1
2019-11-23	Mamamoo	"Hip"	1 (Note: 2019-11-30 (1 week))	12	14
2019-11-23	Stray Kids	"A Story Never Ending"	14	1	1
2019-11-30	IU	"Blueming"	10	1	1
2019-12-07	Exo	"Obsession"	1 (Note: 2019-12-14 (1 week))	6	6
2019-12-07	AOA	"Come See Me"	8	2	2
2019-12-07	ASTRO	"Blue Flame"	14	1	1
2019-12-07	Exo	"Trouble"	19	1	1
2019-12-07	Exo	"Jekyll"	22	1	1
2019-12-14	CL	"+DONE161201+"	3	2	2
2019-12-14	CL	"+REWIND170205+"	4	2	2
2019-12-14	Loona	"The Carol"	5	1	1
2019-12-21	CL	"+Paradox171115+"	7	2	2
2019-12-21	CL	"+I QUIT180327+"	9	1	1
2019-12-21	Stray Kids	"Levanter"	5	2	3
2019-12-21	Park Bom & Sandara Park	"The First Snow"	19	1	1
2019-12-28	Loona	"365"	1	1	1
2019-12-28	NCT U	"Coming Home"	7	1	1
2019-12-28	CL	"+ONE AND ONLY180228+"	13	1	1
2019-12-28	CL	"+THNX190519+"	16	1	1
2020-01-04	Red Velvet	"Psycho"	1	8	8
2020-01-04	Stray Kids	"Mixtape: Gone Days"	8	2	2
2020-01-11	Momoland	"Thumbs Up"	13	1	1
2020-01-11	SuperM	"Let's Go Everywhere"	23	1	1
2020-01-18	Younha feat. RM	"Winter Flower"	1	3	3
2020-01-18	Ateez	"Answer"	6	3	4
2020-01-18	Loona	"Boy, Girl"	14	1	1
2020-01-18	Ateez	"Horizon"	18	1	1
2020-01-18	Baekhyun	"My Love"	20	1	1
2020-01-25	Zico	"Any Song"	4	6	7
2020-02-01	BTS	"Black Swan"	1 (Total 3 weeks)	5	16
2020-02-01	Chanyeol & Punch	"Go Away Go Away"	21	1	1
2020-02-08	Siyeon	"Paradise"	10	1	1
2020-02-08	Super Junior	"2YA2YAO!"	14	2	2
2020-02-15	Everglow	"Dun Dun"	3	5	5
2020-02-15	Loona	"So What"	4	2	2
2020-02-22	Kard	"Red Moon"	8	2	2
2020-02-22	Cherry Bullet	"Hands Up"	11	2	2
2020-02-22	iKon	"Dive"	15	1	1
2020-02-22	Sunmi	"Gotta Go"	17	1	1
2020-02-22	Pentagon	"Dr. Bebe"	18	2	2
2020-02-22	Crush	"Let Us Go"	21	2	2
2020-02-29	CLC	"Me"	5	1	1
2020-02-29	Dreamcatcher	"Scream"	6	2	2
2020-02-29	CLC	"Devil"	7	1	1
2020-02-29	IU	"Give You My Heart"	11	1	1
2020-02-29	Iz*One	"Fiesta"	13	1	1
2020-02-29	Moonbyul	"Eclipse"	14	1	1
2020-02-29	Kim Kyung-hee	"Sigriswil"	18	1	1
2020-02-29	Baek Ye-rin	"Here I Am Again"	21	1	1
2020-03-07	BTS	"On"	1 (Total 4 weeks) (Note: Entered at No. 1 for 3 weeks, returned to No. 1 on 2020-09-05 (1 week))	12	26
2020-03-07	BTS	"My Time" (Jungkook solo)	1 (Note: 2020-08-15 (1 week.))	5	85
2020-03-07	BTS	"Filter" (Jimin solo)	1 (Note: 2020-10-10 (1 week.))	5	82
2020-03-07	BTS	"Friends" (V, Jimin)	3	3	5
2020-03-07	BTS	"Louder Than Bombs"	2	6	9
2020-03-07	BTS	"Inner Child" (V solo)	1 (Note: 2021-03-06 (1 week))	4	13 (R) 14
2020-03-07	BTS	"We Are Bulletproof: The Eternal"	2	5	11
2020-03-07	BTS	"Ugh!" (RM, J-Hope, Suga)	2	5	9
2020-03-07	BTS	"00:00 (Zero O'Clock)" (Jin, V, Jimin, Jungkook)	2	4	7
2020-03-07	BTS	"Moon" (solo by Jin)	2	4	8
2020-03-07	BTS	"Interlude: Shadow" (solo by Suga)	11	3	4
2020-03-07	BTS	"Outro: Ego" (solo by J-Hope)	12	3	3
2020-03-07	BTS	"Respect" (performed by RM and Suga)	13	2	2
2020-03-21	NCT 127	"Kick It"	3	3	5
2020-03-21	Itzy	"Wannabe"	4	7	7
2020-03-21	AleXa	"Do Or Die"	23	1	1
2020-03-21	NCT 127	"Sit Down!"	25	1	1
2020-03-28	Monsta X	"From Zero"	1	1	1
2020-04-04	Oneus	"A Song Written Easily"	11	2	2
2020-04-04	Stray Kids	"Mixtape: On Track"	13	1	1
2020-04-04	Kim Feel	"Someday, the Boy"	15	1	1
2020-04-11	BTS	"Like"	10	1	2
2020-04-11	Winner	"Hold"	15	1	1
2020-04-11	Joohoney	"Red Carpet"	16	1	1
2020-04-11	BTS feat. DJ Friz	"Intro: 2 Cool 4 Skool"	18	1	1
2020-04-11	Seventeen	"Fallin' Flower"	21	1	1
2020-04-11	BTS	"Interlude"	22	1	1
2020-04-11	BTS	"Skit: Circle Room Talk"	23	1	1
2020-04-11	BTS	"Outro: Circle Room Cypher"	24	1	1
2020-04-18	(G)I-dle	"Oh My God"	3	3	3
2020-04-18	Monsta X	"I Do Love U"	5	1	1
2020-04-18	Onewe feat. Hwasa	"Q"	12	1	1
2020-04-25	Loona's JinSoul	"As Time Goes"	2	1	1
2020-04-25	Apink	"Dumhdurum"	10	3	3
2020-05-02	Got7	"Not By The Moon"	5	2	2
2020-05-02	Solar	"Spit it Out"	6	2	2
2020-05-02	Hwasa	"Orbit"	16	2	2
2020-05-09	Chung Ha	"Stay Tonight"	4	3	3
2020-05-09	Oh My Girl	"Nonstop"	14	1	1
2020-05-09	NCT Dream	"Ridin'"	18	2	2
2020-05-09	Stray Kids	"Top"	10	6	8
2020-05-16	IU feat. Suga	"Eight"	1	4	4
2020-05-16	Taeyeon	"Happy"	9	1	1
2020-05-23	Raiden & Chanyeol feat. Lee Hi, Changmo	"Yours"	8	1	1
2020-05-23	Day6	"Zombie"	13	2	2
2020-05-23	Stray Kids	"Slump"	17	2	2
2020-05-30	TXT	"Can't You See Me?"	2	3	3
2020-05-30	NCT 127	"Punch"	5	2	2
2020-05-30	TXT	"Drama"	9	1	1
2020-05-30	NCT 127	"NonStop"	11	1	1
2020-05-30	TXT	"Fairy of Shampoo"	12	1	1
2020-05-30	TXT	"Eternally"	14	1	1
2020-05-30	TXT	"PUMA"	16	1	2
2020-05-30	TXT	"Maze in the Mirror"	18	1	1
2020-05-30	(G)I-dle	"Latata" (English version)	22	1	1
2020-06-06	Suga (Agust D)	"Daechwita"	1 (Total 2 weeks) (Note: Entered at No. 1 for 1 week, returned to No. 1 on 2021-03-13 (1 week))	7	8
2020-06-06	Suga (Agust D) feat. RM	"Strange"	2	1	1
2020-06-06	Suga (Agust D) feat. Max Schneider	"Burn It"	3	2	2
2020-06-06	Suga (Agust D)	"What Do You Think?"	4	2	2
2020-06-06	Suga (Agust D)	"Moonlight"	5	1	2
2020-06-06	Suga (Agust D)	"People"	4	1	3
2020-06-06	Suga (Agust D) feat. Niihwa	"28"	7	1	1
2020-06-06	Suga (Agust D) feat. Kim Jong-wan	"Dear My Friend"	8	1	1
2020-06-06	Suga (Agust D)	"Interlude: Set Me Free"	9	1	1
2020-06-06	Suga (Agust D)	"Honsool"	10	1	1
2020-06-06	Baekhyun	"Candy"	16	1	1
2020-06-06	Monsta X	"Fantasia"	11	2	2
2020-06-13	Twice	"More & More"	2	5	6
2020-06-13	Moonbyul	"Absence"	12	1	1
2020-06-13	Victon	"Mayday"	23	1	1
2020-06-20	Bang Ye-dam	"Wayo"	10	1	1
2020-06-27	Stray Kids	"God's Menu"	4	8	11
2020-06-27	Iz*One	"Secret Story of the Swan"	11	2	2
2020-07-04	BTS	"Stay Gold"	1	6	8
2020-07-04	Seventeen	"Left & Right"	8	3	3
2020-07-04	Zhou Mi and Kim Ryeo-wook	"Starry Night"	23	1	1
2020-07-04	IU	"Into the I-Land"	24	1	1
2020-07-11	Blackpink	"How You Like That"	1 (Note: Entered at No. 1 for 2 weeks, returned to No. 1 on 2020-08-01 (1 week))	14	67
2020-07-11	Sunmi	"Pporappippam"	5	2	2
2020-07-11	Hwasa	"Maria"	6	8	8
2020-07-18	Red Velvet - Irene & Seulgi	"Monster"	7	3	3
2020-07-18	Chung Ha feat. Changmo	"Play"	17	2	2
2020-07-18	Exo-SC feat. 10 cm	"Telephone"	23	1	1
2020-07-25	BTS	"Your Eyes Tell"	1	5	6
2020-07-25	BTS	"Outro : The Journey"	4	2	2
2020-07-25	BTS	"Intro: Calling"	5	2	2
2020-07-25	BTS	"Black Swan" (Japanese version)	8	1	1
2020-07-25	BTS	"On" (Japanese version)	9	1	1
2020-07-25	BTS	"Dionysus" (Japanese version)	10	1	1
2020-07-25	BTS	"Make It Right" (Japanese version)	11	1	1
2020-07-25	BTS	"Boy With Luv" (Japanese version)	12	1	1
2020-07-25	BTS	"Idol" (Japanese version)	13	1	1
2020-07-25	BTS	"Airplane Pt.2" (Japanese version)	14	1	1
2020-07-25	BTS	"Fake Love" (Japanese version)	15	1	1
2020-08-01	Red Velvet - Irene & Seulgi	"Naughty"	6	2	2
2020-08-01	Jeon So-mi	"What You Waiting For"	8	2	2
2020-08-01	Hyoyeon feat. Loopy & Jeon So-yeon	"Dessert"	16	2	2
2020-08-01	Stray Kids	"Hello Stranger"	21	1	1
2020-08-01	SSAK3	"Beach Again"	16	2	2
2020-08-08	Chuu	"Spring Flower"	5	1	1
2020-08-08	Lee Hi	"Holo"	6	1	1
2020-08-08	Ateez	"Inception"	9	2	2
2020-08-08	Ateez	"Thanxx"	18	1	1
2020-08-15	Taemin	"2 Kids"	13	1	1
2020-08-15	(G)I-dle	"Dumdi Dumdi"	13	2	2
2020-08-15	Jessi	"Nunu Nana"	17	2	2
2020-08-22	Treasure	"Boy"	7	1	1
2020-08-22	Treasure	"Come To Me"	10	1	1
2020-08-29	SuperM	"100"	7	1	1
2020-08-29	Itzy	"Not Shy"	8	3	3
2020-08-29	Dreamcatcher	"BOCA"	11	1	1
2020-08-29	J.Y. Park and Sunmi	"When We Disco"	22	1	1
2020-09-05	Kard	"Gunshot"	9	3	3
2020-09-12	K/DA: Miyeon & Soyeon, Wolftyla, & Bea Miller	"The Baddest"	1	7	9 (R) 10
2020-09-12	CLC	"Helicopter"	6	3	3
2020-09-12	SuperM	"Tiger Inside"	7	2	2
2020-09-12	Kard	"Ah Ee Yeah"	20	1	1
2020-09-12	Kard	"Hold On"	24	1	1
2020-09-19	Wonho	"Open Mind"	4	3	3
2020-09-19	Taemin	"Criminal"	10	4	4
2020-09-19	Mamamoo	"Wanna Be Myself"	11	2	2
2020-09-26	Stray Kids	"Back Door"	2	4	5
2020-09-26	Stray Kids	"We Go"	10	1	1
2020-09-26	Stray Kids	"Wow"	12	1	1
2020-09-26	Stray Kids	"Any"	13	1	1
2020-09-26	Stray Kids	"B Me"	15	1	1
2020-09-26	Stray Kids	"Ex"	17	1	1
2020-09-26	Stray Kids	"The Tortoise and the Hare"	20	1	1
2020-09-26	Stray Kids	"My Universe"	21	1	1
2020-10-03	Everglow	"La Di Da"	5	3	3
2020-10-03	Treasure	"I Love You"	9	1	1
2020-10-03	Treasure	"B.L.T (Bling Like This)"	14	1	1
2020-10-10	SuperM	"One (Monster & Infinity)"	7	1	1
2020-10-17	Blackpink	"Lovesick Girls"	1	5	10
2020-10-17	Blackpink	"Pretty Savage"	2	2	4
2020-10-17	Blackpink	"You Never Know"	4	1	1
2020-10-24	Refund Sisters	"Don't Touch Me"	8	1	1
2020-10-24	NCT	"Make A Wish (Birthday Song)"	11	3	3
2020-10-24	Dawn feat. Jessi	"Dawndididawn"	13	1	1
2020-10-24	Weki Meki	"Cool"	25	1	1
2020-10-31	Verivery	"G.B.T.B."	1	1	1
2020-10-31	BTS	"Jump"	6	1	1
2020-10-31	Mamamoo	"Dingga"	8	3	3
2020-10-31	BTS	"Intro: Skool Luv Affair"	9	1	1
2020-10-31	BTS	"Where You From"	10	1	1
2020-10-31	BTS	"Outro: Propose"	13	1	1
2020-10-31	BTS	"Miss Right"	14	1	1
2020-10-31	BTS	"Spine Breaker"	15	1	1
2020-11-07	Twice	"I Can't Stop Me"	1	14	14
2020-11-07	K/DA Miyeon & Soyeon, Madison Beer, Jaira Burns, & Lexie Liu as Seraphine	"More"	1 (Note: 2020-11-14 (1 week))	5	5
2020-11-07	TXT	"Blue Hour"	5	3	4
2020-11-07	Stray Kids	"All In"	21	1	1
2020-11-07	Seventeen	"Home;Run"	22	1	1
2020-11-07	TXT	"Ghosting"	23	1	1
2020-11-07	TXT	"Wishlist"	25	1	1
2020-11-14	CL	"Hwa"	3	1	1
2020-11-14	CL	"5-Star"	13	2	2
2020-11-14	Monsta X	"Love Killa"	14	1	1
2020-11-14	Mamamoo	"Aya"	17	1	1
2020-11-21	K/DA: Twice feat. Bekuh Boom, Annika Wells, & League of Legends	"I'll Show You"	10	1	1
2020-11-21	Treasure	"MMM"	11	1	1
2020-11-21	GFriend	"Mago"	16	2	2
2020-11-21	Taemin	"Idea"	20	2	2
2020-11-21	Treasure	"Orange"	22	1	1
2020-11-28	Aespa	"Black Mamba"	5	3	3
2020-11-28	STAYC	"So Bad"	21	1	1
2020-12-05	BTS	"Life Goes On"	1 (Total 5 weeks) (Note: Entered at No. 1 for 4 weeks, returned to No. 1 on 2021-06-05 (1 week))	14	27
2020-12-05	BTS	"Blue & Grey"	2	5	7
2020-12-05	BTS	"Stay"	1 (Note: 2021-01-09 (1 week))	7	7
2020-12-05	BTS	"Telepathy"	4	4	5
2020-12-05	BTS	"Dis-ease"	5	4	4
2020-12-05	BTS	"Fly to My Room"	6	4	4
2020-12-05	Got7	"Breath"	8	1	1
2020-12-05	NCT U	"90's Love"	15	3	3
2020-12-05	NCT U	"Work It"	23	2	2
2020-12-12	Got7	"Last Piece"	10	1	1
2020-12-12	Enhypen	"Given-Taken"	13	3	3
2020-12-12	Kai	"Mmmh"	15	2	4
2020-12-12	Enhypen	"Let Me In (20 CUBE)"	24	1	1
2020-12-12	Enhypen	"Flicker"	25	1	1
2020-12-19	NCT 2020	"Resonance"	14	1	1
2020-12-19	Red Velvet	"Future"	21	1	1
2020-12-19	Iz*One	"Panorama"	22	1	1
2021-01-02	Twice	"Cry for Me"	1	4	4
2021-01-02	Baekhyun	"Amusement Park"	10	1	1
2021-01-16	Baekhyun	"Get You Alone"	14	1	1
2021-01-23	A.C.E	"Fav Boyz"	4	1	1
2021-01-23	(G)I-dle	"Hwaa"	6	6	6
2021-01-23	Monsta X	"Nobody Else"	10	1	1
2021-01-23	Victon	"What I Said"	21	1	1
2021-01-23	MCND	"Crush"	25	1	1
2021-01-30	Epik High feat. CL & Zico	"Rosario"	11	2	2
2021-01-30	Monsta X	"Night View"	13	1	1
2021-01-30	Oneus	"No Diggity"	18	2	2
2021-02-06	IU	"Celebrity"	3	3	3
2021-02-06	Dreamcatcher	"Odd Eye"	5	2	2
2021-02-06	HyunA	"I'm Not Cool"	8	3	3
2021-02-06	Iz*One	"D-D-Dance"	25	1	1
2021-02-13	Cha Eun-woo	"Love So Fine"	13	2	2
2021-02-20	Aespa	"Forever"	11	1	1
2021-02-27	NCT 127	"Gimme Gimme"	4	2	2
2021-02-27	Kang Daniel	"Paranoia"	5	3	3
2021-02-27	Chung Ha	"Bicycle"	11	2	2
2021-02-27	Treasure	"Beautiful"	23	1	1
2021-02-27	Chuu & Lee Hyeop	"Hello"	25	1	1
2021-03-06	Got7	"Encore"	3	1	1
2021-03-06	Shinee	"Don't Call Me"	8	4	5
2021-03-06	I.M	"God Damn"	9	1	1
2021-03-06	Sunmi	"Tail"	13	3	3
2021-03-06	I.M	"Howlin'"	17	1	1
2021-03-06	Sunmi	"What the Flower"	18	1	1
2021-03-06	I.M	"Happy to Die"	19	1	1
2021-03-06	I.M	"Deadhead (Flower-ed)"	20	1	1
2021-03-06	I.M	"Burn"	21	1	1
2021-03-13	Wonho	"Lose"	5	2	2
2021-03-13	Ateez	"Fireworks (I'm The One)"	6	2	2
2021-03-13	iKon	"Why Why Why"	14	2	2
2021-03-13	Ateez	"Take Me Home"	16	1	1
2021-03-13	Wonho feat. Kilara	"Ain't About You"	18	1	1
2021-03-13	Rain feat. Jackson Wang	"Magnetic"	15	3	3
2021-03-13	Wonho	"Devil"	22	1	1
2021-03-13	Wonho	"Weneed"	23	1	1
2021-03-13	Wonho	"Flash"	25	1	1
2021-03-20	Verivery	"Get Away"	1 (Total 2 weeks)	2	2
2021-03-27	Jessi	"What Type of X"	5	4	4
2021-03-27	Brave Girls	"Rollin'"	13	2	2
2021-03-27	Super Junior	"House Party"	2	2	
2021-04-03	Itzy	"Trust Me (Midzy)"	11	1	1
2021-04-03	B.I	"Midnight Blue"	14	1	1
2021-04-03	B.I	"Blossom"	17	1	1
2021-04-03	B.I	"Remember Me"	18	1	
2021-04-03	Ateez	"Still Here"	24	1	1
2021-04-10	Baekhyun	"Bambi"	10	2	2
2021-04-10	IU	"Lilac"	11	1	1
2021-04-10	IU	"Coin"	18	1	1
2021-04-17	BTS	"Film Out"	1	5	8
2021-04-17	Hoshi (Seventeen)	"Spider"	5	2	2
2021-04-17	Chanyeol	"Tomorrow"	9	1	1
2021-04-17	ASTRO	"One"	15	1	1
2021-04-24	Shinee	"Atlantis"	3	2	2
2021-04-24	Shinee	"Area"	6	1	1
2021-04-24	Shinee	"Days and Years"	7	1	1
2021-04-24	Wheein	"Water Color"	15	1	1
2021-04-24	Seventeen	"Not Alone"	13	2	2
2021-04-24	Kang Daniel	"Antidote"	21	1	1
2021-05-01	Weeekly	"After School"	21	2	2
2021-05-08	Enhypen	"Drunk-Dazed"	3	4	4
2021-05-08	Enhypen	"Fever"	18	1	2
2021-05-08	Enhypen	"Not For Sale"	21	1	1
2021-05-15	eAeon feat. RM	"Don't"	1	1	1
2021-05-15	Itzy	"In the Morning"	3	4	4
2021-05-15	John Park	"I'm Always By Your Side"	15	1	1
2021-05-15	(G)I-dle	"Last Dance"	16	1	1
2021-05-22	NCT Dream	"Hot Sauce"	8	2	2
2021-05-22	Monsta X	"Be Quiet"	14	1	1
2021-05-22	Monsta X	"Rush"	15	1	1
2021-05-22	WJSN The Black	"Easy"	17	1	1
2021-05-22	Monsta X	"Myself"	18	1	1
2021-05-22	Monsta X	"Ready or Not"	19	1	1
2021-05-22	Monsta X	"Mirror"	20	1	1
2021-05-22	Baekhyun with Seomoon Tak	"Hurt"	21	1	1
2021-05-22	Monsta X	"Stand Up"	25	1	1
2021-05-29	Aespa	"Next Level"	3	2	3
2021-05-29	Taemin	"Advice"	4	2	2
2021-05-29	Fromis 9	"We Go"	14	1	1
2021-05-29	Rocket Punch	"Ring Ring"	17	1	2
2021-06-05	Everglow	"First"	5	3	3
2021-06-05	Everglow	"Don't Ask Don't Tell"	20	1	1
2021-06-05	Everglow	"Please Please	21	1	1
2021-06-12	TXT feat. Seori	"0X1=Lovesong (I Know I Love You)"	2	7	9
2021-06-12	Stray Kids	"Wolfgang"	4	1	2
2021-06-12	Monsta X	"Gambler"	5	2	2
2021-06-12	Ateez	"The Real"	6	1 (R) 2	1
2021-06-12	TXT	"Anti-Romantic"	8	5	7
2021-06-12	Monsta X	"Addicted"	11	1	1
2021-06-12	Monsta X	"Secrets"	12	1	1
2021-06-12	Monsta X	"Rotate"	13	1	1
2021-06-12	Monsta X	"Livin' It Up"	14	1	1
2021-06-12	Monsta X	"Heaven"	15	1	1
2021-06-12	Monsta X	"Bebe"	16	1	1
2021-06-12	Seventeen's Mingyu & Wonwoo feat. Lee Hi	"Bittersweet"	21	1	1
2021-06-19	Exo	"Don't Fight the Feeling"	6	2	2
2021-06-19	NCT 127	"Save"	8	1	1
2021-06-19	Twice	"Alcohol-Free"	3	6	6
2021-06-19	Ravi feat. Wonstein	"Cardigan"	22	1	1
2021-06-19	Mamamoo	"Where Are We Now"	24	1	1
2021-06-26	Yugyeom feat. DeVita	"I Want U Around"	2	1	1
2021-06-26	Lightsum	"Vanilla"	8	1	1
2021-06-26	TXT	"Magic"	13	2	2
2021-06-26	BamBam	"riBBon"	17	2	2
2021-06-26	Yugyeom feat. Gray	"All Your Fault"	18	1	1
2021-06-26	BTS	"Wishing On a Star"	20	1	1
2021-07-03	Seventeen	"Ready To Love"	5	1	1
2021-07-03	Seventeen	"Heaven's Cloud"	18	1	1
2021-07-03	Seventeen	"Anyone"	19	1	1
2021-07-10	Stray Kids	"Mixtape: Oh"	1	1	1
2021-07-10	Loona	"PTT (Paint the Town)"	6	2	3
2021-07-10	JSDK	"Only You"	15	1	1
2021-07-10	NCT Dream	"Hello Future"	17	1	1
2021-07-10	M.O.M	"Foolish Love"	18	1	1
2021-07-10	2PM	"Make It"	20	1	1
2021-07-17	Taeyeon	"Weekend"	7	2	2
2021-07-17	Kingdom	"Karma"	8	1	1
2021-07-17	Drippin	"Free Pass"	9	1	1
2021-07-17	BM	"13IVI"	19	1	1
2021-07-24	Minzy	"Teamo"	6	1	1
2021-07-24	Ateez	"Dreamers"	16	1	1
2021-08-07	Monsta X	"Kiss or Death"	11	2	2
2021-08-07	Jin-young	"Dive"	12	2	2
2021-08-07	D.O.	"Rose"	16	1	1
2021-08-07	DPR Live feat. Beenzino & Hwasa	"Hula Hoops"	21	1	1
2021-08-14	Somi	"Dumb Dumb"	5	3	3
2021-08-14	Dreamcatcher	"BEcause"	6	1	1
2021-08-14	ONF	"Ugly Dance"	8	1	1
2021-08-14	ASTRO	"After Midnight"	24	1	1
2021-08-21	Golden Child	"Ra Pam Pam"	2	1	1
2021-08-21	Sunmi	"You Can't Sit with Us"	10	1	1
2021-08-21	Kim Hyo-yeon feat. Bibi	"Second"	17	1	1
2021-08-21	Oneus	"Shut Up Get Crazy Hot!"	22	1	1
2021-08-21	Hyolyn & Dasom	"Summer or Summer"	24	1	1
2021-08-28	ONF	"Popping"	2	1	1
2021-08-28	TXT	"Loser=Lover"	6	5	5
2021-08-28	Red Velvet	"Queendom"	10	2	2
2021-08-28	TXT	"Moa Diary (Dubaddu Wari Wari)"	13	1	1
2021-08-28	Kim Jong-kook & Ateez	"Be My Lover"	17	1	1
2021-08-28	Ateez	"The Black Cat Nero"	21	1	1
2021-08-28	Ateez	"White Love"	25	1	1
2021-09-04	Stray Kids	"Thunderous"	3	6	6
2021-09-04	Verivery	"Trigger"	4	1	1
2021-09-04	Stray Kids	"Domino"	11	1	1
2021-09-04	Stray Kids' Bang Chan & Hyunjin	"Red Lights"	13	1	3
2021-09-04	Stray Kids	"Cheese"	14	1	1
2021-09-04	Jay B feat. Jay Park	"B.T.W"	15	1	1
2021-09-04	CL	"Spicy"	16	2	2
2021-09-04	Stray Kids	"The View"	18	1	1
2021-09-04	Stray Kids	"Ssick"	22	1	1
2021-09-04	Stray Kids	"Sorry, I Love You"	24	1	1
2021-09-11	Kwon Eun-bi	"Door"	3	1	1
2021-09-11	Key feat. Taeyeon	"Hate That..."	5	2	1
2021-09-18	Loona	"Not Friends"	7	1	1
2021-09-18	STAYC	"Stereotype"	16	1	1
2021-09-18	Oneus	"Life is Beautiful"	17	1	1
2021-09-18	I.M	"Loop"	20	1	1
2021-09-21	Reapers Team	"Special Music Video"	34	3	3
2021-09-25	Ateez	"Deja Vu"	4	3	3
2021-09-25	Lisa	"Lalisa"	1	10	10
2021-09-25	Ateez	"Deja Vu"	4	3	3
2021-09-25	HyunA & Dawn	"Ping Pong"	10	2	2
2021-09-25	Wonho	"Blue"	14	1	1
2021-09-25	Chanmina	"I'm a Pop"	16	1	1
2021-09-25	Lee Hi feat. Yoon Mi-rae	"Red Lipstick"	22	1	1
2021-10-02	NCT 127	"Sticker"	5	2	2
2021-10-02	NCT 127	"Lemonade"	8	1	1
2021-10-09	Itzy	"Loco"	4	3	3
2021-10-09	Key	"Bad Love"	13	1	1
2021-10-09	Itzy	"Swipe"	23	1	1
2021-10-16	E'Last	"Dark Dream"	4	1	1
2021-10-16	Stray Kids	"Scars"	7	2	1
2021-10-16	Aespa	"Savage"	13	2	2
2021-10-23	Seungmin (Stray Kids)	"Here Always"	8	1	1
2021-10-23	Enhypen	"Tamed-Dashed"	11	2	2
2021-10-23	Jessi	"Cold Blooded"	12	2	2
2021-10-30	Lightsum	"Vivace"	8	1	1
2021-10-30	IU	"Strawberry Moon"	10	1	1
2021-11-06	Seventeen	"Rock with You"	5	2	2
2021-11-06	Kingdom	"Black Crown"	7	1	1
2021-11-06	NCT 127	"Favorite"	8	2	2
2021-11-06	DreamNote	"Ghost"	10	1	1
2021-11-06	Seventeen	"To You"	15	1	1
2021-11-06	NCT 127	"Love on the Floor"	17	1	1
2021-11-06	Seventeen	"2 Minus 1"	18	1	1
2021-11-06	Seventeen	"Crush"	19	1	1
2021-11-06	Seventeen	"Imperfect Love"	22	1	1
2021-11-06	NCT 127	"Pilot"	23	1	1
2021-11-06	Seventeen	"I Can't Run Away"	25	1	1
2021-11-13	Somi	"XOXO"	9	1	1
2021-11-13	The Boyz	"Maverick"	13	1	1
2021-11-13	F.Hero and Milli feat. Stray Kids' Changbin	"Mirror Mirror"	19	1	1
2021-11-20	Jin	"Yours"	1	2	4
2021-11-27	Twice	"Scientist"	7	2	2
2021-11-27	Mirani feat. Uneducated Kid	"Lambo!"	12	1	1
2021-12-04	Hwasa	"I'm a B"	7	2	2
2021-12-04	Hwasa	"Bless U"	10	1	1
2021-12-04	Monsta X	"Rush Hour"	11	1	1
2021-12-11	Chung Ha	"Killing Me"	9	1	1
2021-12-11	Stray Kids	"Christmas EveL"	10	2	2
2021-12-11	IVE	"Eleven"	9	3	2
2021-12-11	Kai	"Peaches"	13	2	2
2021-12-18	Everglow	"Pirate"	13	1	1
2021-12-25	Ateez	"Turbulence"	9	1	1
2021-12-25	NCT U	"Universe (Let's Play Ball)"	14	1	1
2022-01-01	Aespa	"Dreams Come True (Aespa version)"	7	3	3
2022-01-01	Minho	"Heartbreak"	9	1	1
2022-01-08	BamBam feat. Seulgi	"Who Are You"	9	1	1
2022-01-08	The Rose	"Beauty and the Beast"	15	1	1
2022-01-15	Got the Beat	"Step Back"	5	2	2
2022-01-15	Kep1er	WA DA DA	13	1	1
2022-01-22	Enhypen	"Blessed-Cursed"	7	2	2
2022-01-22	Enhypen	"Polaroid Love"	9	1	1
2022-01-29	Taeyeon	"Can't Control Myself"	13	1	1
2022-02-12	Ateez	"Don't Stop"	6	2	2
2022-02-12	Mamadol	"WooAH HIP"	14	1	1
2022-02-19	Mark Lee	"Child"	8	1	1
2022-02-26	Jungkook	"Stay Alive"	1 (Total 2 weeks)	3	3
2022-02-26	Taeyeon	"INVU"	8	3	3
2022-02-26	Wonho	"Eye On You"	9	1	1
2022-02-26	Apink	"Dilemma"	14	1	1
2022-03-05	STAYC	"Run2U"	9	2	2
2022-03-05	Sky-Hi and Stray Kids' 3Racha	"Just Breathe"	11	1	1
2022-03-12	Loona's Olivia Hye	"I'll Be Your Spring"	14	1	1
2022-03-19	Jihyo	"Stardust Love Song"	14	1	1
2022-03-26	Kihyun	"Voyager"	6	1	1
2022-03-26	Kihyun	"Rain"	8	1	1
2022-03-26	Kihyun	", (Comma)"	9	1	1
2022-03-26	Jay Park feat. IU	"Ganadara"	10	1	1
2022-03-26	(G)I-dle	"Tomboy"	12	2	1
2022-04-02	Stray Kids	"Maniac"	1	6	7
2022-04-02	Stray Kids	"Venom"	7	2	2
2022-04-02	Red Velvet	"Feel My Rhythm"	8	2	2
2022-04-02	Stray Kids	"Charmer"	10	1	1
2022-04-02	Solar	"Honey"	13	1	1
2022-04-02	Stray Kids	"Freeze"	14	1	1
2022-04-09	Red Velvet	"Wildside"	9	1	1
2022-04-09	Ateez	"HALA HALA (Hearts Awakened, Live Alive)"	15	1	1
2022-04-16	BigBang	"Still Life"	1	3	3
2022-04-16	Kingdom	"Ascension"	6	1	1
2022-04-16	Ive	"Love Dive"	8	3	3
2022-04-23	Hong Jin-young	"Viva La Vida"	8	2	2
2022-04-30	Loona	"Shake It"	1	1	1
2022-04-30	Jessi	"Zoom"	7	6	6
2022-04-30	Taeyong & Wonstein	"Love Theory"	8	1	1
2022-05-07	Monsta X	"Love"	10	1	1
2022-05-14	Psy feat. Suga	"That That"	1 (Total 2 weeks) (Note: Entered at No. 1 for 2 weeks)	6	12
2022-05-14	Viviz	"Bop Bop!"	5	1	1
2022-05-14	E'Last	"Creature"	8	1	1
2022-05-14	Le Sserafim	"Fearless"	14	2	2
2022-05-14	Psy feat. Jessi	"Ganji"	15	1	1
2022-05-21	TXT	"Good Boy Gone Bad"	7	2	2
2022-05-21	BTS	"24/7=Heaven"	9	1	1
2022-05-21	Loona & Kep1er	"Don't Go"	14	1	1
2022-05-21	TXT	"Opening Sequence"	15	1	1
2022-05-21	Brave Girls & Loona	"Tell Me Now"	11	1	1
2022-06-04	Got7	"Nanana"	6	2	2
2022-06-11	Seventeen	"Hot"	3	2	2
2022-06-11	Loona	"Pose"	4	2	2
2022-06-11	NCT Dream	"Beatbox"	9	2	2
2022-06-11	Seventeen	"Don Quixote"	14	1	1
2022-06-11	Seventeen	"Shadow"	15	1	1
2022-06-25	BTS	"Yet to Come"	1 (Total 3 weeks)	4	14 (R) 18
2022-06-25	BTS	"Run BTS"	1 (Note: Peaked at No. 1 on 2026-01-26 (1 week))	4	10
2022-06-25	BTS	"For Youth"	3	4	4
2022-06-25	BTS	"Born Singer"	4	3	3
2022-06-25	BTS	"N.O"	7	1	1
2022-07-09	Nayeon	"Pop!"	7	1	1
2022-07-09	Nayeon feat. Felix (Stray Kids)	"No Problem"	10	1	1
2022-07-16	J-Hope	"More"	1	1	5
2022-07-16	Sunmi	"Heart Burn"	14	1	1
2022-07-23	Aespa	"Girls"	6	1	1
2022-07-30	J-Hope	"Arson"	1	3	5
2022-07-30	J-Hope	"=" (Equal Sign)	2	2	3
2022-07-30	J-Hope	"Safety Zone"	3	1	2
2022-07-30	J-Hope	"Pandora's Box"	4	1	2
2022-07-30	J-Hope	"Future"	5	1	3
2022-07-30	J-Hope	"What If..."	6	1	1
2022-07-30	J-Hope	"Stop"	6	1	2
2022-07-30	Seventeen	"World"	12	2	2
2022-07-30	Seventeen	"Cheers"	13	1	1
2022-08-06	J-Hope	"Blue Side"	3	1	2
2022-08-13	Stray Kids	"Mixtape: Time Out"	4	1	1
2022-08-13	Ateez	"Guerrilla"	5	1	1
2022-08-13	ILY:1	"Que Sera Sera"	6	1	1
2022-08-20	X ARA	"Hitchhiker"	3	1	1
2022-08-20	Girls' Generation	"Forever 1"	4	1	2
2022-09-03	Blackpink	"Pink Venom"	1	4	11
2022-09-03	Ive	"After Like"	3	3	3
2022-09-03	Ive	"My Satisfaction"	8	1	1
2022-09-03	Jaehyun	"Forever Only"	14	1	1
2022-09-10	Balming Tiger's Omega Sapien, bj Wnjn & Mudd the Student, feat. RM	"Sexy Nukim"	1 (Total 2 weeks)	3	5
2022-09-10	Twice	"Talk That Talk"	4	3	3
2022-09-10	Twice	"Queen of Hearts"	13	1	1
2022-09-10	Twice	"Basics"	15	1	1
2022-10-01	Blackpink	"Shut Down"	1	1	6
2022-10-01	Blackpink	"Ready For Love"	8	1	1
2022-10-01	Blackpink	"Yeah Yeah Yeah"	9	1	1
2022-10-01	Crush feat. J-Hope	"Rush Hour"	1 (Note: Peaked at No. 1 on 2022-10-08 (1 week))	1	3
2022-10-01	NCT 127	"2 Baddies"	11	1	1
2022-10-01	Stray Kids	"Heyday"	13	1	1
2022-10-08	Jun	"Limbo"	11	1	1
2022-10-22	Stray Kids	"Case 143"	1	3	3
2022-10-22	Mamamoo	"Illella"	5	2	2
2022-10-22	Mamamoo	"1,2,3 Eoi!"	8	1	1
2022-10-22	Stray Kids	"Taste"	9	1	1
2022-10-22	Mamamoo	"L.I.E.C."	10	1	1
2022-10-22	Stray Kids	"3Racha"	13	1	1
2022-10-29	Le Sserafim	"Antifragile"	8	2	2
2022-10-29	(G)I-dle	"Nxde"	13	1	1
2022-11-05	Jin	"Super Tuna"	1 (Total 3 weeks) (Note: Entered at No. 1 for 1 week, returned to No. 1 on 2024-06-22 (1 week), 2024-10-26 (1 week))	2	4
2022-11-05	Jin	"Abyss"	2	2	2
2022-11-05	Jin	"Tonight"	3	2	2
2022-11-12	Jin	"The Astronaut"	1 (Total 3 weeks) (Note: Entered at No. 1 for 3 weeks)	7	18
2022-12-03	Jungkook	"Dreamers"	1 (Total 2 weeks)	10	12
2022-12-10	RM	"Bicycle"	3	2	2
2022-12-17	RM with Youjeen	"Wild Flower"	1	4	8
2022-12-17	RM with Anderson .Paak	"Still Life"	2	2	3
2022-12-17	RM with Erykah Badu	"Yun"	3	1	1
2022-12-17	RM	"Lonely"	4	1	1
2022-12-17	RM with Tablo	"All Day"	5	1	1
2022-12-17	RM with Colde	"Hectic"	6	1	1
2022-12-17	RM with Park Ji-yoon	"No.2"	7	1	1
2022-12-17	RM with Kim Sa-wol	"Forg_tful"	8	1	1
2022-12-31	NewJeans	"Ditto"	4	12	12
2023-01-14	Ateez	"Halazia"	2	1	1
2023-01-14	NewJeans	"OMG"	3	11	12
2023-01-21	Monsta X	"Beautiful Liar"	8	1	1
2023-01-28	Taeyang feat. Jimin	"Vibe"	1	5	6
2023-01-28	Dreamcatcher	"Reason"	8	1	1
2023-01-28	ILY:1	"Twinkle, Twinkle"	10	1	1
2023-02-11	TXT	"Sugar Rush Ride"	1	2	2
2023-02-11	TXT	"Devil by the Window"	4	1	1
2023-02-11	TXT	"Tinnitus (Wanna Be a Rock)"	6	1	1
2023-02-11	TXT	"Farewell, Neverland"	7	1	1
2023-02-11	TXT	"Happy Fools"	8	1	1
2023-02-11	Stray Kids	"The Sound"	11	1	2
2023-02-18	BTS	"Attack On Bangtan"	1	1	2
2023-02-18	BSS feat. Lee Young-ji	"Fighting"	8	1	1
2023-02-18	BSS feat. Peder Elias	"7PM"	13	1	1
2023-02-18	BSS	"Lunch"	14	1	1
2023-02-25	Key	"Heartless"	5	3	3
2023-02-25	Key	"Killer"	10	1	1
2023-03-11	Fifty Fifty	"Cupid"	2	1	41
2023-03-18	Jimin	"Promise"	2	4	4
2023-03-18	Jimin	"Christmas Love"	3	1	2
2023-03-25	Twice	"Set Me Free"	2	2	2
2023-03-25	Twice	"Crazy Stupid Love"	9	1	1
2023-03-25	Twice	"Got the Thrills"	10	1	1
2023-03-25	Twice	"Wildflower"	11	1	1
2023-03-25	Twice	"Blame It On Me"	12	1	1
2023-04-01	Jimin	"Set Me Free Pt. 2"	1	4	4
2023-04-01	Kai	"Rover"	12	1	1
2023-04-08	Jimin	"Like Crazy"	1 (Total 4 weeks) (Note: Entered at No. 1 (2 weeks); peaked on 2023-04-29 (1 week), 2023-07-08 (1 week))	7	17
2023-04-08	Jimin	"Face-Off"	4	2	2
2023-04-08	Jimin	"Alone"	5	2	2
2023-04-08	Ive	"Kitsch"	11	1	1
2023-04-15	Jisoo	"Flower"	2	3	6
2023-04-15	Jisoo	"All Eyes on Me"	4	2	1
2023-04-15	Agust D	"Agust D"	6	2	2
2023-04-22	Agust D & IU	"People Pt. 2"	1	2	2
2023-04-22	Ive	"I Am"	6	2	2
2023-04-22	Mark Lee	"Golden Hour"	13	1	1
2023-05-06	Agust D	"Haegeum"	1	4	6
2023-05-06	Agust D feat. J-Hope	"Huh?!"	3	1	1
2023-05-06	Agust D	"Amygdala"	5	1	1
2023-05-06	Agust D feat. Ryuichi Sakamoto & Woosung	"Snooze"	6	1	3
2023-05-06	Agust D	"D-Day"	4	1	2
2023-05-06	Agust D	"Life Goes On"	8	1	1
2023-05-06	Agust D	"SDL"	9	1	1
2023-05-06	Agust D	"Polar Night"	3	1	2
2023-05-06	Taeyang feat. Lisa	"Shoong!"	11	3	3
2023-05-06	Seventeen	"Super"	8	3	2
2023-05-13	Colde feat. RM	"Don't Ever Say Love Me"	4	2	2
2023-05-13	Le Sserafim feat. Nile Rodgers	Unforgiven	7	4	4
2023-05-27	BTS	"The Planet"	1	1	1
2023-05-27	(G)I-dle	"Queencard"	9	3	3
2023-06-03	Enhypen	"Bite Me"	7	2	2
2023-06-10	Le Sserafim	"Eve, Psyche and Bluebeard's Wife"	8	1	2
2023-06-10	Kard	"Icky"	15	1	1
2023-06-17	Stray Kids	"S-Class"	2	1	3
2023-06-17	Stray Kids feat. Tiger JK	"Topline"	8	1	1
2023-06-17	Stray Kids	"Hall of Fame"	11	1	1
2023-06-17	Stray Kids	"Super Bowl"	13	1	1
2023-06-17	Stray Kids	"Item"	15	1	1
2023-06-24	BTS	"Take Two"	1	1	5
2023-06-24	Exo	"Let Me In"	5	1	1
2023-07-01	Ateez	"Bouncy"	4	2	2
2023-07-01	NCT Dream	"Broken Melodies"	8	1	1
2023-07-08	Shinee	"Hard"	13	1	1
2023-07-15	Jungkook	"Still With You"	1	1	3
2023-07-15	Jungkook	"My You"	2	1	3
2023-07-15	Exo	"Hear Me Out"	5	1	1
2023-07-22	NewJeans	"Super Shy"	2	1	2
2023-07-22	NewJeans	"New Jeans"	5	1	2
2023-07-22	Exo	"Cream Soda"	12	1	1
2023-08-05	NewJeans	"ETA"	5	1	3
2023-08-05	NewJeans	"Cool with You"	7	1	1
2023-08-12	Enhypen	"Criminal Love"	12	1	1
2023-08-19	Lim Kim	"Confess To You"	12	1	1
2023-08-19	Somi	"Fast Forward"	10	1	2
2023-08-26	V	"Love Me Again"	1	6	6
2023-08-26	Aespa	"Spicy"	6	1	1
2023-09-02	Jihyo	"Killin' Me Good"	7	1	2
2023-09-02	Everglow	"Slay"	13	1	1
2023-09-09	V feat. Peakboy	"Snow Flower"	2	1	1
2023-09-09	V	"Scenery"	3	1	1
2023-09-16	Hwasa	"I Love My Body"	8	2	3
2023-09-16	Stray Kids	"Butterflies"	14	1	1
2023-09-23	D.O.	"I Do"	11	1	1
2023-09-30	Loossemble	"Sensitive"	10	1	1
2023-10-07	Ive	"Either Way"	8	1	1
2023-10-21	NCT 127	"Fast Check"	8	1	1
2023-10-21	Ive	"Off The Record"	10	1	1
2023-10-28	TXT	"Chasing That Feeling"	1	1	2
2023-10-28	TXT	"Growing Pain"	7	1	1
2023-10-28	TXT	"Blue Spring"	8	1	1
2023-10-28	TXT	"Dreamer"	9	1	1
2023-10-28	TXT	"Deep Down"	10	1	1
2023-11-04	Chanyeol	"Good Enough"	8	1	1
2023-11-04	Seventeen	"God of Music"	9	1	1
2023-11-11	Taemin	"Guilty"	8	2	
2023-11-18	A.C.E	"Effortless"	10	1	1
2023-11-25	Stray Kids	"Lalalala"	1	3	3
2023-11-25	Stray Kids	"Megaverse"	6	1	1
2023-11-25	Aespa	"Drama"	8	1	1
2023-12-02	Enhypen	"Sweet Venom"	5	2	2
2023-12-09	Babymonster	"Batter Up"	5	1	1
2023-03-16	Ateez	"Crazy Form"	3	1	1
2023-03-16	Ateez (Yeo-sang, San, Woo-young)	"It's You"	7	1	1
2023-03-16	Ateez	"Silver Light"	8	1	1
2023-03-16	Ateez	"We Know"	10	1	1
2024-01-06	Jimin	"Closer Than This"	1	1	3
2024-01-27	Itzy	"Untouchable"	8	1	1
2024-02-03	IU	"Love Wins All"	3	3	1
2024-02-03	Zhang Hao	"I Wanna Know"	9	1	1
2024-02-03	Ive	"All Night"	10	1	1
2024-03-02	Le Sserafim	"Easy"	4	4	4
2024-03-09	Twice	"One Spark"	3	2	1
2024-03-09	Twice	"You Get Me"	8	1	1
2024-03-09	Twice	"Rush"	10	1	1
2024-03-16	Le Sserafim	"Smart"	9	2	3
2024-03-23	Chung Ha feat. Ateez's Hongjoong	"Eenie Meenie"	6	1	1
2024-04-13	J-Hope with Gaeko & Yoon Mi-rae	"Neuron"	1	1	1
2024-04-13	J-Hope with Jungkook	"I Wonder..."	2	1	1
2024-04-13	J-Hope	"On the Street solo version	2	1	2
2024-04-13	J-Hope with Huh Yunjin	"I Don't Know"	4	1	1
2024-04-13	J-Hope with Jinbo the SuperFreak	"What If..."	5	1	1
2024-04-13	TXT	"Deja Vu"	3	2	1
2024-04-20	Illit	"Magnetic"	6	8	8
2024-04-13	Stray Kids	"Why?"	2	1	1
2024-05-04	Crush	"Love You with All My Heart"	4	3	3
2024-05-11	Zico feat. Jennie	"Spot!"	1	1	1
2024-05-11	Seventeen	"Maestro"	5	2	2
2024-05-25	Aespa	"Supernova"	5	2	2
2024-06-08	RM	"Nuts"	1	1	2
2024-06-08	RM	"Groin"	2	1	1
2024-06-08	RM & Little Simz	"Domodachi"	3	1	1
2024-06-08	NewJeans	"How Sweet"	4	2	2
2024-06-08	NewJeans	"Bubble Gum"	6	1	1
2024-06-15	Ateez	"Work"	1	3	4
2024-06-15	ARTMS	"Virtual Angel"	9	1	1
2024-06-29	Nayeon	"ABCD"	2	2	2
2024-07-06	NewJeans	"Supernatural"	2	1	1
2024-07-06	NewJeans	"Right Now"	6	1	1
2024-07-13	Jimin feat. Loco	"Smeraldo Garden Marching Band"	1	2	3
2024-07-13	Babymonster	"Forever"	7	1	1
2024-07-13	Be First & Ateez	"Hush-Hush"	9	1	1
2024-07-20	Kiss of Life	"Sticky"	10	1	1
2024-07-27	Enhypen	"XO (Only If You Say Yes)"	2	1	
2024-08-03	Stray Kids	"Chk Chk Boom"	1 (Total 2 weeks)	5	12
2024-08-03	Jimin	"Rebirth (Intro)"	2	1	1
2024-08-03	Stray Kids	"Slash"	5	2	2
2024-08-03	Stray Kids	"Mountains"	7	1	1
2024-08-03	Stray Kids	"Jjam"	9	1	1
2024-08-03	Stray Kids	"Twilight"	10	1	1
2024-08-17	Enhypen	"Brought the Heat Back"	8	1	1
2024-09-14	Le Sserafim	"Crazy"	1	1	4
2024-09-21	Meovv	"Meow"	10	1	1
2024-09-28	Yeonjun	"Ggum"	4	2	2
2024-10-05	Fifty Fifty	"SOS"	7	1	1
2024-10-19	Stray Kids	"Falling Up"	2	2	2
2024-11-02	Seventeen feat. DJ Khaled	"Love, Money, Fame	4	1	1
2024-11-09	Jin	"I'll Be There"	1	2	3
2024-11-16	TXT	"Over the Moon"	3	2	1
2024-11-23	Stray Kids	"Giant"	2	1	2
2024-11-23	Enhypen	"No Doubt"	4	2	2
2024-11-23	Enhypen	"Daydream"	10	1	1
2024-11-30	Jin & Wendy	"Heart on the Window"	1	1	1
2024-11-30	Jin	"Another Level"	2	1	1
2024-11-30	Jin	"I Will Come to You"	3	1	1
2024-11-30	Jin	"Falling"	1 (Note: Peaked at No. 1 on 2024-12-07 (1 week))	3	3
2024-11-30	Ateez	"Ice on My Teeth"	3	4	4
2024-12-28	Stray Kids	"Walkin on Water"	1	2	2
2024-12-28	Stray Kids feat. Tablo	"U"	5	1	1
2024-12-28	Stray Kids	"Hallucination" (I.N)	6	1	1
2024-12-28	Stray Kids	"Bounce Back"	7	1	1
2024-12-28	Hyunjin	"So Good"	8	1	1
2024-12-28	Han	"Hold My Hand"	9	1	1
2025-01-04	Im Hyun-sik	"See The Light"	10	1	1
2025-01-18	Yoo Yeon-seok	"Say My Name"	7	1	1
2025-01-18	BSS	"CBZ (Prime Time)"	10	1	1
2025-01-25	Ive	"Rebel Heart"	6	1	1
2025-02-01	Got7	"Python"	4	4	4
2025-02-01	D.O.	"Snowfall At Night"	7	1	1
2025-02-08	Jin	"Close to You"	1	2	2
2025-03-01	Jisoo	"Earthquake"	1	3	3
2025-03-08	Hearts2Hearts	"The Chase"	9	1	1
2025-03-15	G-Dragon & Anderson .Paak	"Too Bad"	6	1	1
2025-03-22	Hoshi X Woozi	"96ers"	9	1	1
2025-03-29	Le Sserafim	"Hot"	1	2	2
2025-03-29	Le Sserafim	"Ash"	8	1	1
2025-03-29	Yeji	"Air"	9	1	1
2025-04-05	Bang Chan & Hyunjin	"Escape"	1	2	2
2025-04-05	Lee Know & Seungmin	"Cinema"	2	1	1
2025-04-05	Changbin & I.N	"Burnin' Tires"	3	1	1
2025-04-05	Beomgyu	"Panic"	8	2	1
2025-04-19	Kai	"Adult Swim"	7	1	1
2025-05-03	Astro with Viviz, etc.	"Moon"	4	1	1
2025-05-17	TXT	"Love Language"	1	1	1
2025-05-17	Meovv	"Hands Up"	9	1	1
2025-05-24	E'Last	"Crazy Train"	8	1	1
2025-05-31	Jin	"Nothing Without Your Love"	1	1	1
2025-05-31	Jin	"Rope It"	2	1	2
2025-05-31	Jin	"Background"	3	1	1
2025-05-31	Jin & Yena	"Loser"	4	1	1
2025-05-31	Jin	"With the Clouds"	5	1	1
2025-05-31	Jin	"To Me, Today"	6	1	1
2025-06-07	Shinee	Artist"	5	1	1
2025-06-07	Shinee	"Starlight"	6	1	1
2025-06-07	Seventeen	"Thunder"	8	2	2
2025-06-07	Enhypen	"Bad Desire (With or Without You)"	3	2	2
2025-06-21	Stray Kids	"Hollow"	7	2	2
2025-06-21	Le Sserafim	"Different"	9	1	1
2025-06-28	Ateez	"Lemon Drop"	1	1	1
2025-06-28	Ateez	"Castle"	8	1	1
2025-06-28	Ateez	”Masterpiece"	9	1	1
2025-07-26	Ateez	"In Your Fantasy"	1	1	4
2025-07-26	Ateez	"Sagittarius"	6	1	1
2025-07-26	Ateez	"Skin"	7	1	1
2025-07-26	Ateez	"Slide to Me"	8	1	1
2025-07-26	Ateez	"Legacy"	9	1	1
2025-07-26	Ateez	"Roar"	10	1	1
2025-08-02	BTS	"Permission to Dance" (Live)	1	1	1
2025-08-02	BTS	"On" (Live)	2	1	1
2025-08-02	BTS	"Fire" (Live)	3	1	1
2025-08-02	BTS	"Blue & Grey" (Live)	4	1	1
2025-08-02	BTS	"Dope" (Live)	5	1	1
2025-08-02	BTS	"Black Swan" (Live)	6	1	1
2025-08-02	BTS	"Fake Love" (Live)	7	1	1
2025-08-02	BTS	"DNA" (Live)	8	1	1
2025-08-02	BTS	"Blood Sweat & Tears" (Live)	9	1	1
2025-08-02	BTS	"Life Goes On" (Live)	10	1	1
2025-09-06	Stray Kids	"Ceremony"	1 (Total 2 weeks)	7	7
2025-09-06	Stray Kids	"Creed"	6	1	1
2025-09-06	Stray Kids	"Bleep"	7	1	1
2025-09-06	Stray Kids	"Phoenix"	8	1	1
2025-09-06	Stray Kids	"In My Head"	9	1	1
2025-09-06	Stray Kids	"0801"	10	1	1
2025-09-27	Taemin	"Veil"	3	1	1
2025-10-11	Zhang Hao	"Refresh!"	4	1	1
2025-10-11	Doyoung	"I Find You"	10	1	1
2025-10-18	Han, Felix & I.N	"Genie"	4	1	1
2025-10-25	Cortis	"Go!"	4	1	1
2025-10-25	Meovv	"Burning Up"	5	2	2
2025-10-25	Babymonster	"We Go Up"	6	1	1
2025-10-25	Hwasa	"Good Goodbye"	1 (Note: Peaked at No. 1 on 2025-12-13 (1 week))	2	10 (R) 11
2025-11-08	Le Sserafim & J-Hope	"Spaghetti"	1 (Total 2 weeks)	3	3
2025-11-08	Ateez	"From (2018)"	9	1	1
2025-11-29	Ateez	"Choose"	4	1	1
2025-12-06	Stray Kids	"Do It"	1	2	4
2025-12-06	Stray Kids	"Divine"	3	1	1
2025-12-06	Stray Kids	"Photobook"	7	1	1
2025-12-06	Illit	"Not Cute Anymore	4	2	7
2026-01-31	Enhypen	"Knife"	1	1	2
2026-01-31	Enhypen feat. Hwang So-yoon	"No Way Back"	7	1	1
2026-01-31	Enhypen	"Sleep Tight"	9	1	1
2026-01-31	Enhypen	"Stealer"	10	1	1
2026-02-21	Ateez	"Adrenaline"	1	2	2
2026-02-21	Ive	"Bang Bang"	6	2	2
2026-02-21	Ateez	"NASA"	7	1	1
2026-02-21	Ateez	"Ghost"	10	1	1
2026-03-07	Hearts2Hearts	"Rude!"	10	1	1
2026-04-04	BTS	"Aliens"	1	4	4
2026-04-04	BTS	"Please"	2	2	3
2026-04-04	BTS	"One More Night"	3	2	2
2026-04-04	Stray Kids	"Stay"	4	1	1
2026-04-18	Kiss of Life	"Who Is She"	6	1	1
2026-04-25	TXT	"Stick with You"	6	1	1
2026-05-09	Le Sserafim	"Celebration"	2	1	1
2026-05-09	Cortis	"RedRed"	10	1	1
2026-05-19	Illit	"It's Me"	8	2	2
2026-05-23	Babymonster	"Choom"	9	1	1
2026-05-30	Byeon Woo-seok	"Fate Line"	9	1	1
2026-06-06	Taemin	"Permission"	5	1	1

== See also ==
- List of K-pop on the Billboard charts
- List of K-pop albums on the Billboard charts
- List of K-pop on the Billboard year-end charts
- Timeline of K-pop at Billboard
- Timeline of K-pop at Billboard in the 2020s
- Korea K-Pop Hot 100
- List of K-pop artists
- List of South Korean idol groups
- World Digital Song Sales
