= (Hash) =

[#]
- Digital and Limited A cover

EP by Loona
- Released: February 5, 2020
- Genre: K-pop
- Length: 17:40
- Language: Korean
- Label: Blockberry Creative
- Producers: Lee Jong-myung (exec.); Lee Soo-man; Coach & Sendo; David Anthony; Anna Timgren; Makeumine Works; MinGtion; Le'mon; Kim Yeonseo; Johan Gustafsson; Realmeee; Hayley Aitken

Loona chronology
[+ +] (2019)	[#] (2020)	[12:00] (2020)

Singles from [#]
- 1. "365" Released: December 13, 2019; 2. "So What" Released: February 5, 2020

[#] (read as "hash") is the second extended play by South Korean girl group Loona. It was released on February 5, 2020, by Blockberry Creative and distributed by Kakao M.

== Background ==
On March 31, 2019, a teaser titled "#" was released on the group's official YouTube channel. The clip looks back to Loona's previous releases and teaser films and ends with the word "burn". It also features imagery of butterflies, as well as the symbols "++" and "xx". On May 31, a second teaser was released titled "La Maison Loona", with the phrase "delayed but someday" showed at the end. On December 13, a teaser titled "#1" was released. On December 31, an image teaser was released.

On January 8, 2020, it was announced that member HaSeul would halt activities with the group due to health concerns. On January 10, a second teaser was released titled "#2", setting the release date to February 5. On January 13, individual teasers started to being released, starting with member HyeJu (formerly Olivia Hye) and ending with a group photo on January 19. On the same day, the track list was released, revealing the proper lead single as "So What". On January 22, a third teaser was released titled "#3". On February 5, 2020, member Yves confirmed in the album's press showcase that SM Entertainment founder Lee Soo-man was involved in the production of this album, doing so after he watched the group's cover video for NCT 127's "Cherry Bomb".

The description of the "So What" music video announced that the album's limited editions included a CD-only song, "Day & Night".

== Singles ==
"365" was released as a lead single on December 13, 2019.

"So What" was released as the 2nd single and title track in conjunction with the EP on February 5, 2020.

== Commercial performance ==
The EP debuted at number 2 on South Korea's Gaon Album Chart and sold 79,797 copies in the month of February, becoming the group's best selling work at the time, while "So What" was the group's highest-charting song on one of Gaon's singles charts, reaching number 68 on the Download Chart. The EP also charted at number 28 on the UK Digital Albums Chart, surpassing their previous EP which charted at number 48.

[#] debuted at No. 4 on Billboard's World Albums chart, tying their highest position on the tally to date with their previous two EPs, while earning 3,000 units in the week ending February 6, which marks their best sales week in America.

On March 12, 2020, Loona received their first music show win on Mnet's M Countdown with "So What".

== Track listing ==
[#] track listing
No.	Title	Lyrics	Music	Arrangement	Length
1.	"#"		Coach & Sendo	Coach & Sendo	1:06
2.	"So What"	Cho Yoon-kyung	David Anthony; Anna Timgren	David Anthony; IMLAY	3:18
3.	"Number 1"	makeumine works; JQ	minGtion; Tara Nabavi; Malin Johansson	minGtion	3:22
4.	"Oh (Yes I Am)"	Le'mon	Coach & Sendo; Le'mon	Coach & Sendo	3:15
5.	"Ding Ding Dong" (땡땡땡, Ttaeng Ttaeng Ttaeng)	Kim Yeonseo	minGtion; Kim Yeonseo	minGtion; Kim Yeonseo	2:58
6.	"365"	Hwang Yubin	Johan Gustafsson; Realmeee; Hayley Aitken	Johan Gustafsson; Realmeee; Hayley Aitken	3:41
Total length:					17:40

Limited A and B hidden track
No.	Title	Lyrics	Music	Arrangement	Length
7.	"Day and Night"	Kim Yeonseo	Coach & Sendo; Kim Yeonseo	Coach & Sendo; Kim Yeonseo	3:34
Total length:					21:14

== Charts ==
Chart performance for [#]
Chart (2020)	Peak position
Australian Digital Albums (ARIA)	20
Hungarian Albums (MAHASZ)	22
South Korean Albums (Gaon)	2
UK Digital Albums (OCC)	28
UK Independent Albums (Official Charts)	48
US Heatseekers Albums (Billboard)	19
US Independent Albums (Billboard)	44
US World Albums (Billboard)	4

Chart performance for singles from [#]
Song	Chart (2019)	Peak position
"365"	US World Digital Songs (Billboard)	1
"So What"	US World Digital Songs (Billboard)	4
"So What"	South Korea (K-pop Hot 100)	89

== Certification and sales ==
Region	Certification	Certified units/sales
South Korea	—	80,208
United States	—	3,000

== Release history ==
Region	Date	Format	Label
South Korea	February 5, 2020	Digital download; streaming; CD	Blockberry Creative; Kakao M
Various	February 5, 2020	Digital download; streaming	Blockberry Creative

== See also ==
- List of 2020 albums
