= So What (Loona song) =

2020 single by Loona

Single by Loona

from the EP [#]
- Language: Korean
- Released: February 5, 2020
- Recorded: 2020
- Genre: Dance-pop; bass house
- Length: 3:18
- Label: Blockberry Creative
- Songwriter: Jo Yoon-kyung
- Producers: David Anthony; Anna Timgren

Loona singles chronology
"365" (2019)	"So What" (2020)	"Why Not?" (2020)

Music video
- "So What" on YouTube

"So What" is a song released by the South Korean girl group Loona. It was released on February 5, 2020, as the lead single from their mini-album [#]. It earned their first music show win on M! Countdown on March 12.

== Background and release ==
On December 15, 2019, a teaser title Number 1 or #1 was released. On January 1 at midnight, Loona released a teaser for their EP [#] with the title "Coming Soon". They had previously shared the promotional single "365" from the EP. A few days later on January 10, they released another teaser titled Number 2 or #2, which revealed their comeback date as February 5, 2020. Between January 14 and 19, teaser photos for the group were released, with the first teaser photo of HyeJu (formerly Olivia Hye), and the second of HyunJin. A day later the tracklist for the EP was released, including "So What". On January 23, another teaser titled Number 3 or #3 was released along with teasers for the members being issued between January 24 and 27. The final teasers to be released were "To all LOONA's around the world", a highlight medley, and lastly a teaser for the music video.

== Commercial performance ==
The song debuted at number 89 on the Billboard K-Pop Hot 100 chart becoming their first entry on the chart. On the US World songs chart the song peaked at number 4 becoming their second highest-peaking song on the chart.

== Promotion ==
On January 8, 2020, Blockberry Creative announced that the leader HaSeul would be sitting out from promotions for health reasons. On February 5, the day of the song's release, Loona planned to hold a showcase for "So What" at 8:00PM. Due to COVID-19 concerns, on February 2, Blockberry Creative announced that the showcase was canceled for fans, and it would be held without them as planned. On February 25, a few weeks after [#]'s release, Loona made their first appearance on Weekly Idol as special guests with Oh My Girl's Seunghee and Hyojung.

== Accolades ==
On March 12, 2020, Loona received their first music show win on Mnet's M Countdown with the song.

Music program awards
Program	Date	Ref.
M Countdown (Mnet)	March 12, 2020	

== Charts ==
Chart performance for "So What"
Chart (2020)	Peak position
South Korea (Gaon Download)	68
South Korea (K-pop Hot 100)	89
US World Digital Song Sales (Billboard)	4

== Release history ==
Region	Date	Format	Label
Various	February 5, 2020	Digital download; streaming	Blockberry Creative

== See also ==
- List of M Countdown Chart winners (2020)
