= 365 (Loona song) =

2019 single by Loona

- Digital cover

Single by Loona

from the EP [#]
- Language: Korean
- Released: December 13, 2019
- Genre: Pop; R&B
- Length: 3:41
- Label: Blockberry Creative
- Songwriter: Hwang Yu-bin
- Producers: Johan Gustafsson; Realmeee; Hayley Aitken

Loona singles chronology
| "Butterfly" (2019) | "365" (2019) | "So What" (2020) |

"365" is a song by South Korean girl group Loona. It was released on December 13, 2019, as a pre-release single from their second extended play [#], released in February 2020.

== Composition ==
The song was written by Hwang Yubin and was produced and arranged by Johan Gustafsson, Realmeee, and Hayley Aitken."365" is a sweet piano-led, wintertime pop and R&B ballad that features dramatic instrumentals and soaring synth elements. Lyrically, the song is full of heartfelt meaning from the group, as they sing about how they appreciate the fans who wait for them, as they promise to shine for "365" days, or the span of a year.

== Commercial performance ==
"365" reached number one on the US iTunes chart and debuted at the US World Digital Song Sales chart. It is their first number one single on the chart, third top ten single and fourth entry as a group.

== Music video ==
A stripped-back music video for the song was released on group's official YouTube channel, featuring the members getting some down time in an art studio with each working on a painting.

== Credits and personnel ==
Credits adapted from Melon.

- Korean Lyrics - Hwang Yu-bin
- Composition & Arranged - Johan Gustafsson, Realmeee, Hayley Aitken
- Vocal Directed - Realmeee
- Background Vocal - Choi Young-kyoung
- Recording Engineer - Min Seong-su at doobdoob Studio
- Digital Editor - Jang Woo-young at doobdoob Studio, Jeong Yu-ra
- Mixing Engineer - Koo Jong-pil at KLANG STUDIO
- Mastering Engineer- Kwon Nam-woo at 821 Sound Mastering

== Charts ==
| Chart (2019) | Peak position |
|---|---|
| US World Digital Songs (Billboard) | 1 |

== Release history ==
| Region | Date | Format | Label |
|---|---|---|---|
| Various | December 13, 2019 | Digital download; streaming | Blockberry Creative |
