= Universe Ticket missions =

Universe Ticket is a South Korean reality competition show produced by SBS, airing from 2023 to 2024. The show aimed to form an eight-member girl group with a two-and-a-half-year contract. The final group, UNIS, debuted under F&F Entertainment, a newly established agency affiliated with the clothing brand F&F.

== Missions ==
=== Battle Week (Episode 1-4) ===
==== 1:1 Battle (Episode 1-2) ====
The Battle Week is an intense two-part showdown where the contestants will go head to head for a chance at survival. The first battle, being the 1:1 Battle, is an individual head to head competition between two contestants, where contestants can showcase their vocals, dance, and/or performance skills. Any girl in the top 41 from the profile pre-voting gets to choose their opponent from the bottom 41 to determine each matchup. where the top 41 contestants pick their opponents from ranks 42-82. The winners of each matchup are voted by majority from the five Unicorns, with all of them getting a benefit for the second part of Battle Week.

Color key

Not Broadcast

Round 1: 1:1 Battle
#	High Rank					Low Rank				
#	Episode 1									
#	Contestant	Rank	Song	Original artist(s)	Votes	Contestant	Rank	Song	Original artist(s)	Votes
1	Hwang Si-eun	5	"Alone" + "Hurt"	Coogie + NewJeans	1	Choi Yeo-jin	50	"Smiley"	Yena	4
2	Kotoko	18	"Pop!"	Nayeon	0	Yu	80	"Queencard"	(G)I-dle	5
3	Nana	19	"Gashina"	Sunmi	5	Izumi	81	"Knock"	Lee Chaeyeon	0
4	Elisia	11	"Selfish"	YooA	3	Yukino	73	"Dumb Dumb"	Jeon Somi	2
5	Kim Su-jin	39	"Bbibbi" + "Beatbox"	IU + NCT Dream	3	Bae Ha-ram	71	"What Type of X"	Jessi	2
6	Kwon Chae-won	2	"Heroine"	Sunmi	5	Jeon Ji-eun	42	"Broken Clock"	Busters	0
7	Bang Yun-ha	31	"Sneakers"	Itzy	5	Laura	65	"Hurt" + "Boss"	NewJeans+ NCT U	0
8	Lim Seo-won	9	"Atlantis Princess"	BoA	5	Yamaguchi Yuriko	47	"Eight" + "Panorama"	IU + Iz*One	0
#	Episode 2									
1	Ahn Seung-bi	33	"1, 2, 3, 4" + "Boss"	Lee Hi + NCT U	3	Oh Yoon-a	49	"Don't Know What To Do"	Blackpink	2
2	Jang Su-a	36	"Smiley"	Yena	0	Narumi	53	"Gotta Go"	Chungha	5
3	Gabi	7	"Solo"	Jennie	5	Jessica	61	"Pink Venom"	Blackpink	0
4	Anxin	14	"Flower"	Jisoo	4	Idota Yui	79	"Bubble Pop!"	Hyuna	1
5	Gehlee Dangca	22	"Pretty Girl"	Kara	2	Jayla	43	"Queencard"	(G)I-dle	3
#	Not Broadcast									
1	Riel	1	"Siren"	Sunmi	1	Xiaoyu	54	"24 Hours"	Sunmi	4
2	Vanesya	3	"ASAP"	STAYC	0	Nako	60	"ASAP"	STAYC	5
3	Vũ Linh Ðan	4	"Psycho"	Red Velvet	3	Yona	63	"Don't Know What To Do"	Blackpink	2
4	Jin Hyeonju	6	"Snapping"	Chungha	2	Bae Yeram	58	"Rover"	Kai	3
5	Lee Sun-woo	8	"Wa Da Da"	Kep1er	3	Kim Hyemi	55	"Secret Garden"	Oh My Girl	2
6	Aya Natsumi	10	"Queencard"	(G)I-dle	N/A	Jeong Huigyeong	77	"Pop!"	Nayeon	N/A
7	Alyssa	12	"Roller Coaster"	Chungha	5	Cho Minseo	52	"Glass Bead"	GFriend	0
8	Kim Su-min	13	"Black Mamba"	Aespa	4	Lee Su-an	51	"Next Level"	Aespa	1
9	Oh Da-eun	15	"Drive"	Miyeon	4	Kwon Ye-jin	69	"Selfish"	YooA	1
10	Heo Sunbin	16	"24 Hours"	Sunmi	3	Yang Eugene	82	"Pop!"	Nayeon	2
11	Kwon Eun-hyung	17	"Pretty Girl"	Kara	3	Zhou Jiaqi	72	"Queencard"	(G)I-dle	2
12	Enny	20	"Solo"	Jennie	4	Pia	44	"Hurt" + "Loco"	NewJeans + Itzy	1
13	Kim Soyul	21	"Gashina"	Sunmi	3	Natchayathorn	62	"Knock"	Lee Chae-yeon	2
14	Kim Seo-yeon	23	"24 Hours"	Sunmi	0	Jung Ji-won	56	"Flower"	Jisoo	5
15	Park Ye-won	24	"Tunnel"	Kim Se-jeong	N/A	Cho Chae-young	70	"Drive"	Miyeon	N/A
16	May	26	"Sneakers"	Itzy	3	Honma Yuriko	64	"Psycho"	Red Velvet	2
17	Choi Hye-rin	27	"Secret Garden"	Oh My Girl	N/A	Park Ye-hyeon	66	"Dreams Come True"	Aespa	N/A
18	Choi Sung-eun	28	"Skyline"	Kim Se-jeong	4	Lee Eunchae	46	"Comet"	Younha	1
19	Minari	29	"Hello"	Joy	0	Oukikk	67	"Dessert"	Kim Hyo-yeon	5
20	Lee Soo-vin	30	"Gee"	Girls' Generation	2	Lee Huran	59	"Mr. Chu"	Apink	3
21	Kim Hyo-jin	32	"Way to Go!"	Girls' Generation	3	Jang Su-bin	76	"Dumb Dumb"	Jeon Somi	2
22	Noh Yeon-woo	34	"Glass Bead"	GFriend	N/A	Yoo Yena	75	"Knock"	Lee Chaeyeon	N/A
23	Mila	35	"Psycho"	Red Velvet	1	Yuri	68	"Yukino Hana" + "Loco"	Ailee + Itzy	4
24	Kim Chae-a	37	"Way to Go!"	Girls' Generation	0	Nizi	74	"Loco"	Itzy	5
25	Kim Chae-won	38	"Sneakers"	Itzy	3	Kim Soobin	57	"Dessert"	Kim Hyo-yeon	2
26	Lee Jine	40	"Gotta Go"	Chungha	2	Yoon Sooin	45	"Workaholic" + "Hot"	Bolbbalgan4 + Seventeen	3
27	Kim Yuri	41	"Not Shy"	Itzy	4	Jeon Jin-yeong	78	Better	BoA	1
28	Jang Min-ju	25	"Sneakers"	Itzy	0	Goo Gyo-ryeon	48	"Dumb Dumb"	Jeon Somi	5

==== Revenge Battle (Episode 2-4) ====
The second battle of Battle Week is the Revenge Battle, which will have the Winners and the Challengers (the losers) from the 1:1 Battles going up against each other. The Winners get to form their own teams, and then each Winner's corresponding Challenger that they won against in the 1:1 Battle would be on the opposing team. The contestants are presented with five concepts, without knowing what songs each one has. The concepts are as follows: Sparkling, Pure, Cute, Charismatic, and Enchanting. Once the teams have formed, the Winners team of each concept will find out the two song options, and choose the one that they want, giving the other team the other song option. All the teams would have three days to prepare for their performances on the final day of Battle Week. The winning team of each matchup are voted by majority from the five Unicorns, with each winning team having four members passed directly to the next round. The other 21 contestants who would be moving onto the next round would be decided through the global fan votes.

Color key

Leader
Winning Team

Round 2: Revenge Battle
Concept	Winners					Challengers				
Concept	Performance			Contestants	Unicorn Votes	Performance			Contestants	Unicorn Votes
Concept	#	Song	Original artist(s)	Contestants	Unicorn Votes	#	Song	Original artist(s)	Contestants	Unicorn Votes
Sparkling	8	"Red Flavor"	Red Velvet	Elisia	2	7	"Dolphin"	Oh My Girl	Yukino	3
Sparkling	8	"Red Flavor"	Red Velvet	Choi Sung-eun	2	7	"Dolphin"	Oh My Girl	Lee Eun-chae	3
Sparkling	8	"Red Flavor"	Red Velvet	Kim Hyo-jin	2	7	"Dolphin"	Oh My Girl	Jang Su-bin	3
Sparkling	8	"Red Flavor"	Red Velvet	Kim Chae-won	2	7	"Dolphin"	Oh My Girl	Kim Soo-bin	3
Sparkling	8	"Red Flavor"	Red Velvet	Choi Yeo-jin	2	7	"Dolphin"	Oh My Girl	Hwang Si-eun	3
Sparkling	8	"Red Flavor"	Red Velvet	Oukikk	2	7	"Dolphin"	Oh My Girl	Minari	3
Sparkling	8	"Red Flavor"	Red Velvet	Yoo Ye-na	2	7	"Dolphin"	Oh My Girl	Noh Yeon-woo	3
Sparkling	8	"Red Flavor"	Red Velvet	Yu	2	7	"Dolphin"	Oh My Girl	Kotoko	3
Pure	5	"Into the New World"	Girls' Generation	Kwon Chae-won	4	6	"Ah-Choo"	Lovelyz	Jeon Ji-eun	1
Pure	5	"Into the New World"	Girls' Generation	Lee Sun-woo	4	6	"Ah-Choo"	Lovelyz	Kim Hye-mi	1
Pure	5	"Into the New World"	Girls' Generation	Heo Sun-bin	4	6	"Ah-Choo"	Lovelyz	Yang Eugene	1
Pure	5	"Into the New World"	Girls' Generation	Kim So-yul	4	6	"Ah-Choo"	Lovelyz	Natchayathorn	1
Pure	5	"Into the New World"	Girls' Generation	Bang Yun-ha	4	6	"Ah-Choo"	Lovelyz	Laura	1
Pure	5	"Into the New World"	Girls' Generation	Yoon Soo-in	4	6	"Ah-Choo"	Lovelyz	Lee Jin-e	1
Pure	5	"Into the New World"	Girls' Generation	Goo Gyo-ryeon	4	6	"Ah-Choo"	Lovelyz	Jang Min-ju	1
Pure	5	"Into the New World"	Girls' Generation	Jung Ji-won	4	6	"Ah-Choo"	Lovelyz	Kim Seo-yeon	1
Pure	5	"Into the New World"	Girls' Generation	Lee Hu-ran	4	6	"Ah-Choo"	Lovelyz	Lee Soo-vin	1
Cute	2	"TT"	Twice	Vũ Linh Ðan	4	1	"Tell Me"	Wonder Girls	Yona	1
Cute	2	"TT"	Twice	Gabi	4	1	"Tell Me"	Wonder Girls	Jessica	1
Cute	2	"TT"	Twice	Lim Seo-won	4	1	"Tell Me"	Wonder Girls	Yamaguchi Yuriko	1
Cute	2	"TT"	Twice	Oh Da-eun	4	1	"Tell Me"	Wonder Girls	Kwon Ye-jin	1
Cute	2	"TT"	Twice	Kwon Eun-hyung	4	1	"Tell Me"	Wonder Girls	Zhou Jiaqi	1
Cute	2	"TT"	Twice	Choi Hye-rin	4	1	"Tell Me"	Wonder Girls	Park Ye-hyeon	1
Cute	2	"TT"	Twice	Nako	4	1	"Tell Me"	Wonder Girls	Vanesya	1
Cute	2	"TT"	Twice	Yuri	4	1	"Tell Me"	Wonder Girls	Mila	1
Charismatic	10	"Ddu-Du Ddu-Du"	Blackpink	Alyssa	4	9	"Fire"	2NE1	Cho Min-seo	1
Charismatic	10	"Ddu-Du Ddu-Du"	Blackpink	Kim Su-min	4	9	"Fire"	2NE1	Lee Su-an	1
Charismatic	10	"Ddu-Du Ddu-Du"	Blackpink	Nana	4	9	"Fire"	2NE1	Izumi	1
Charismatic	10	"Ddu-Du Ddu-Du"	Blackpink	Enny	4	9	"Fire"	2NE1	Pia	1
Charismatic	10	"Ddu-Du Ddu-Du"	Blackpink	Kim Su-jin	4	9	"Fire"	2NE1	Bae Ha-ram	1
Charismatic	10	"Ddu-Du Ddu-Du"	Blackpink	Jayla	4	9	"Fire"	2NE1	Gehlee Dangca	1
Charismatic	10	"Ddu-Du Ddu-Du"	Blackpink	Bae Ye-ram	4	9	"Fire"	2NE1	Jin Hyeon-ju	1
Charismatic	10	"Ddu-Du Ddu-Du"	Blackpink	Nizi	4	9	"Fire"	2NE1	Kim Chae-a	1
Enchanting	3	"Mister"	Kara	Aya Natsumi	0	4	"Diva"	After School	Jeong Hui-gyeong	5
Enchanting	3	"Mister"	Kara	Anxin	0	4	"Diva"	After School	Idota Yui	5
Enchanting	3	"Mister"	Kara	Park Ye-won	0	4	"Diva"	After School	Cho Chae-young	5
Enchanting	3	"Mister"	Kara	May	0	4	"Diva"	After School	Honma Yuriko	5
Enchanting	3	"Mister"	Kara	Ahn Seung-bi	0	4	"Diva"	After School	Oh Yoon-a	5
Enchanting	3	"Mister"	Kara	Kim Yu-ri	0	4	"Diva"	After School	Jeon Jin-yeong	5
Enchanting	3	"Mister"	Kara	Narumi	0	4	"Diva"	After School	Jang Su-a	5
Enchanting	3	"Mister"	Kara	Xiaoyu	0	4	"Diva"	After School	Riel	5

=== Universe: Road to Prism ===
The next phase, Universe: Road to Prism, officially begins, challenging contestants to climb through five hierarchical ranks of P.R.I.S.M, each bringing them closer to their ultimate goal. All contestants start at the initial base rank, M, but their levels can go up with Unicorn Tickets from the Unicorns, or Fan Tickets from the fans, based on their performances. Only the top eight contestants will reach the highest rank, P, receiving PRISM Tickets and securing their debut.

=== Level Station (Episode 5-6) ===
The first station on the Road to Prism is the Level Station, which will have the contestants competing against each other to have their rank promoted to the next rank. Within every rank, the contestants are still classified in different levels, having High, Average, and Low. Each contestants' level is determined with the Level Test. This test will have the contestants perform the second signal song of the show, "Ticket to You", in small groups of two or three, in front of the Unicorns, while having already seen the choreography video. Once the contestants were split into equal groups for each level, they filmed the performance video for the song, with each level having their own section(s) of the song. Once Ticket to You wrapped up, the contestants in each level were split into two teams by the production teams of the songs they'd be performing. The contestants would have two weeks to prepare for their performances, including parts distribution, practice, and recording. As a benefit, the contestants in the High would get to perform original songs, instead of having to do covers, like those in Average and Low. The winning team of each matchup is decided by the four Unicorns, with each winning team having a certain number of members promoted to the next rank, S, and the losing team having a certain number of members eliminated, with numbers based on the level within M.

Color key

Leader
Winning Team

Round 3: Level Station
Level	Performance			Team			Performance			Team		
Level	#	Song	Original artist(s)/ Production credits	Name	Position	Contestants	#	Song	Original artist(s)/ Production credits	Name	Position	Contestants
High	5	"Rush Hour"	Lyrics & Composition: PAPERMAKER	Highway	Killing Part	Bang Yun-ha	6	"WHATEVA"	Lyrics & Composition: GALACTIKA	Forever	Killing Part	Elisia
High	5	"Rush Hour"	Lyrics & Composition: PAPERMAKER	Highway	Main Vocal	Kim Su-jin	6	"WHATEVA"	Lyrics & Composition: GALACTIKA	Forever	Main Vocal	Lim Seo-won
High	5	"Rush Hour"	Lyrics & Composition: PAPERMAKER	Highway	Lead Vocal	Kim Soo-bin	6	"WHATEVA"	Lyrics & Composition: GALACTIKA	Forever	Lead Vocal	Jin Hyeon-ju
High	5	"Rush Hour"	Lyrics & Composition: PAPERMAKER	Highway	Sub Vocal 1	Yuri	6	"WHATEVA"	Lyrics & Composition: GALACTIKA	Forever	Sub Vocal 1	Oh Da-eun
High	5	"Rush Hour"	Lyrics & Composition: PAPERMAKER	Highway	Sub Vocal 2	Bae Ye-ram	6	"WHATEVA"	Lyrics & Composition: GALACTIKA	Forever	Sub Vocal 2	Lee Soo-vin
High	5	"Rush Hour"	Lyrics & Composition: PAPERMAKER	Highway	Sub Vocal 3	Hwang Si-eun	6	"WHATEVA"	Lyrics & Composition: GALACTIKA	Forever	Sub Vocal 3	Lee Eun-chae
High	5	"Rush Hour"	Lyrics & Composition: PAPERMAKER	Highway	Main Rapper; Main Dancer	Nizi	6	"WHATEVA"	Lyrics & Composition: GALACTIKA	Forever	Sub Vocal 4	Lee Hu-ran
Average	1	"Super Star"	Jewelry	Twinkle	Killing Part	Kotoko	2	"Girls on Top"	BoA	Attention	Killing Part	Nana
Average	1	"Super Star"	Jewelry	Twinkle	Main Vocal	Kim Su-min	2	"Girls on Top"	BoA	Attention	Killing Part 2	Jayla
Average	1	"Super Star"	Jewelry	Twinkle	Lead Vocal	Choi Hye-rin	2	"Girls on Top"	BoA	Attention	Main Vocal	Lee Sun-woo
Average	1	"Super Star"	Jewelry	Twinkle	Sub Vocal	Kwon Chae-won	2	"Girls on Top"	BoA	Attention	Lead Vocal	Goo Gyo-ryeon
Average	1	"Super Star"	Jewelry	Twinkle	Main Rapper	Oh Yoo-na	2	"Girls on Top"	BoA	Attention	Sub Vocal	Gabi
Average	1	"Super Star"	Jewelry	Twinkle	Lead Rapper	Nako	2	"Girls on Top"	BoA	Attention	Main Dancer	Bae Ha-ram
Average	1	"Super Star"	Jewelry	Twinkle			2	"Girls on Top"	BoA	Attention	Lead Dancer	Jeon Jin-yeong
Low	3	"As I Told You"	Kim Sung-jae	Volcano	Killing Part	Jang Su-a	4	"Nan"	Clon	Bulldozer	Killing Part	Narumi
Low	3	"As I Told You"	Kim Sung-jae	Volcano	Center	Park Ye-won	4	"Nan"	Clon	Bulldozer	Main Vocal	Yona
Low	3	"As I Told You"	Kim Sung-jae	Volcano	Main Vocal	Minari	4	"Nan"	Clon	Bulldozer	Lead Vocal	Gehlee Dangca
Low	3	"As I Told You"	Kim Sung-jae	Volcano	Lead Vocal	Aya Natsumi	4	"Nan"	Clon	Bulldozer	Sub Vocal	Idota Yui
Low	3	"As I Told You"	Kim Sung-jae	Volcano	Sub Vocal	Vanesya	4	"Nan"	Clon	Bulldozer	Rapper 1	Heo Sun-bin
Low	3	"As I Told You"	Kim Sung-jae	Volcano	Rapper	Riel	4	"Nan"	Clon	Bulldozer	Rapper 2	Kwon Eun-hyung

=== Unit Station ===
==== Position Unit ====
In the Position Unit, contestants choose from three units—Vocal, Visual, and Performance—based on their strengths and skills. This decision is crucial for their progress in the competition. Judges closely observe the performances and award Unicorn Tickets to standout contestants, granting them direct advancement and recognition for their exceptional talent.

Color Key:

- Promoted to Next Prism Level
- Nominee For Promotion

Unit	Original artist(s)	Song	Contestants
Visual	Orange Caramel	"Catallena"	Nana
Visual	Orange Caramel	"Catallena"	Gabi
Visual	Orange Caramel	"Catallena"	Kotoko
Visual	Orange Caramel	"Catallena"	Hwang Si-eun
Visual	Orange Caramel	"Catallena"	Oh Yoon-a
Visual	Orange Caramel	"Catallena"	Yona
Visual	Orange Caramel	"Catallena"	Kim Su-min
Visual	Orange Caramel	"Catallena"	Kwon Eun-hyung
Vocal	Wanna One	"Beautiful"	Gehlee Dangca
Vocal	Wanna One	"Beautiful"	Elisia
Vocal	Wanna One	"Beautiful"	Lim Seo-won
Vocal	Wanna One	"Beautiful"	Kim Sujin
Vocal	Wanna One	"Beautiful"	Lee Huran
Vocal	Wanna One	"Beautiful"	Jin Hyeonju
Vocal	Wanna One	"Beautiful"	Bang Yunha
Vocal	Wanna One	"Beautiful"	Lee Sunwoo
Performance	Itzy	"Loco"	Bae Ha-ram
Performance	Itzy	"Loco"	Bae Ye-ram
Performance	Itzy	"Loco"	Narumi
Performance	Itzy	"Loco"	Goo Gyo-ryeon
Performance	Itzy	"Loco"	Nizi
Performance	Itzy	"Loco"	Jayla
Performance	Itzy	"Loco"	Jeon Jin-yeong
Performance	Itzy	"Loco"	Yuri

==== New Song Unit ====
The contestants are split into two groups, each performing a new song created for the show to demonstrate their versatility and growth. The elimination process involves votes from the producers, judges, and contestants. If a contestant receives two or more votes, they are eliminated. Those with one vote, along with others, will face a one-on-one battle to decide who goes home.

Color Key:

- Promoted to P (securing their spot in UNIS)
- Promoted to R
- Promoted to I
- Eliminated In S
- Voted Out By Contestants, Unicorns, Producers

Unit	Original artist(s)	Song	Contestants
Dream Girls	Dream Girl Unit	"Dream of Girls"	Elisia
Dream Girls	Dream Girl Unit	"Dream of Girls"	Gehlee Dangca
Dream Girls	Dream Girl Unit	"Dream of Girls"	Lim Seo-won
Dream Girls	Dream Girl Unit	"Dream of Girls"	Oh Yoon-a
Dream Girls	Dream Girl Unit	"Dream of Girls"	Bae Ha-ram
Dream Girls	Dream Girl Unit	"Dream of Girls"	Kotoko
Dream Girls	Dream Girl Unit	"Dream of Girls"	Nana
Dream Girls	Dream Girl Unit	"Dream of Girls"	Yona
Dream Girls	Dream Girl Unit	"Dream of Girls"	Yuri
Dream Girls	Dream Girl Unit	"Dream of Girls"	Goo Gyo-ryeon
Dream Girls	Dream Girl Unit	"Dream of Girls"	Hwang Si-eun
Yummy Yum	Yummy Yum Unit	"Yummy Yum"	Bang Yunha
Yummy Yum	Yummy Yum Unit	"Yummy Yum"	Bae Ye-ram
Yummy Yum	Yummy Yum Unit	"Yummy Yum"	Kwon Eun-hyung
Yummy Yum	Yummy Yum Unit	"Yummy Yum"	Gabi
Yummy Yum	Yummy Yum Unit	"Yummy Yum"	Lee Sun-woo
Yummy Yum	Yummy Yum Unit	"Yummy Yum"	Jeon Jin-yeong
Yummy Yum	Yummy Yum Unit	"Yummy Yum"	Lee Hu-ran
Yummy Yum	Yummy Yum Unit	"Yummy Yum"	Narumi
Yummy Yum	Yummy Yum Unit	"Yummy Yum"	Jayla
Yummy Yum	Yummy Yum Unit	"Yummy Yum"	Jin Hyeon-ju
Yummy Yum	Yummy Yum Unit	"Yummy Yum"	Kim Su-min
Yummy Yum	Yummy Yum Unit	"Yummy Yum"	Kim Su-jin
Yummy Yum	Yummy Yum Unit	"Yummy Yum"	Nizi

=== Final Station ===
The Final Station of Universe: Road to PRISM begins, featuring two concepts: Dream and Prism. Contestants are split into groups to perform, with judges awarding Unicorn Tickets to standout performers. The final lineup is determined by fan votes and Unicorn Ticketing.

Color Key:

- Final member of UNIS (vote)
- Final member of UNIS (unicorn ticketing)

Concept	Result	Original artist(s)	Song	Contestants		
Dream	Lost	Fin. K. L	"White"	Nana	Elisia	Gehlee Dangca
Dream	Lost	Fin. K. L	"White"	Kim Su-min	Kotoko	Oh Yoo-na
Dream	Lost	Fin. K. L	"White"	Gabi	Narumi	Yuri
Dream	Won	Super Junior	"Miracle"	Bang Yun-ha	Lim Seo-won	Hwang Si-eun
Dream	Won	Super Junior	"Miracle"	Jin Hyeon-ju	Bae Ha-ram	Lee Sun-woo
Dream	Won	Super Junior	"Miracle"	Jeon Jin-yeong		
Prism	Won	Original Song (Produced by GALACTIKA)	"DOPAMINE"	Nana	Lim Seo-won	Oh Yoo-na
Prism	Won	Original Song (Produced by GALACTIKA)	"DOPAMINE"	Kotoko	Jin Hyeon-ju	Hwang Si-eun
Prism	Won	Original Song (Produced by GALACTIKA)	"DOPAMINE"	Narumi		
Prism	Lost	Original Song (Produced by PAPERMAKER)	"Camera"	Gabi	Elisia	Bang Yun-ha
Prism	Lost	Original Song (Produced by PAPERMAKER)	"Camera"	Kim Su-min	Gehlee Dangca	Yuri
Prism	Lost	Original Song (Produced by PAPERMAKER)	"Camera"	Jeon Jin-yeong	Lee Sun-woo	Bae Ha-ram

== Mission Results ==
=== Battle Week Eliminations ===
The first voting period took place from September 9, 2023, to October 10, 2023. Regarding eliminations, forty-one contestants would be passed to the next round. Out of those forty-one contestants, four contestants from each of the winning teams would receive a direct pass to the next round, regardless of their rank from the voting period, making for a total of twenty contestants passed directly. Out of the remaining sixty-two contestants, the top twenty-one from the voting period would receive a ticket pass to the next round, with the other forty-one contestants being then eliminated from the show.

Color key

Unicorn Ticket
Fan Ticket
Left the show

Battle Week Eliminations (Episode 4)
Rank	Contestants	Points	Rank	Contestants	Points	Rank	Contestants	Points	Rank	Contestants	Points
1	Vanesya	1,259,390	12	Gabi	—	22	Narumi	191,470	36	Yuri	—
2	Lee Sun-woo	—	13	Oh Da-eun	227,250	23	Minari	189,700	46	Lee Eun-chae	—
3	Kwon Eun-hyung	375,300	14	Yona	223,750	24	Kotoko	—	49	Kim Soo-bin	—
4	Choi Hye-rin	368,990	15	Kwon Chae-won	209,550	25	Lee Hu-ran	—	51	Jayla	—
5	Elisia	349,980	16	Park Ye-won	208,440	26	Jin Hyeon-ju	184,260	53	Nako	—
6	Riel	339,390	17	Heo Sun-bin	208,440	27	Goo Gyo-ryeon	—	56	Kim Su-jin	—
7	Alyssa	—	18	Kim Su-min	208,150	28	Aya Natsumi	175,390	57	Jeon Jin-yeong	—
8	Gehlee Dangca	273,960	19	Bae Ha-ram	206,450	29	Bae Ye-ram	—	59	Jang Su-a	—
9	Oh Yoon-a	—	20	Nana	201,230	32	Hwang Si-eun	—	66	Nizi	—
10	Lim Seo-won	—	21	Lee Soo-vin	198,090	35	Bang Yun-ha	—	77	Idota Yui	—
11	Natchayathorn	—									

=== Level Station Eliminations ===
Out of the thirty-nine remaining contestants, nine of them would be promoted to the next rank, S, while nine would be eliminated, following the Level Station performances. Each level would have a different amount of promoted and eliminated contestants. From High, the winning team would have four promoted contestants, and the losing team would have two eliminated contestants, from Average, three contestants who won would be promoted, and three who lost would be eliminated, and from Low, two contestants who won would be promoted, and four who lost would be eliminated. Any contestant who didn't get promoted or eliminated would keep their M ranking into the next mission.
