= 1/6 (EP) =

EP by Sunmi
- Released: August 6, 2021
- Genres: Pop; bubblegum pop; city pop; dance-pop; synthwave
- Length: 19:51
- Languages: Korean; English
- Label: Abyss Company

Sunmi chronology
Warning (2018)	1/6 (2021)	Heart Maid (2025)

Singles from 1/6
- 1. "You Can't Sit with Us" Released: August 6, 2021

1/6 (Korean: 6분의1; also written as and pronounced One Sixth) is the third extended play by South Korean singer Sunmi. It was released by Abyss Company on August 6, 2021. It is the singer's first Korean EP in nearly three years, following Warning (2018). The singer's third extended play features six songs including the lead single, "You Can't Sit with Us".

The visual concept of 1/6 is a throwback to the early 2000s. The EP deals with the profound inner emotions such as anger, confusion, sadness and happiness that "we can't help but go through in the gravity of our lives." The mini album is primarily a retro-styled pop record that combines synthwave, dance-pop, bubblegum pop and city pop elements.

== Background ==
South Korean singer-songwriter Sunmi released her second extended play, Warning, on September 4, 2018. The EP produced the hit singles like: "Gashina", "Heroine" and "Siren". On July 14, 2021, Sunmi's label Abyss Company confirmed in a statement to Newsen that the singer is in the midst of preparations for a "new album" and is "aiming for an August comeback". On July 19, the singer revealed that 1/6 would be released on August 6, 2021. Sunmi unveiled the track listing to the EP on her official social media accounts and website, revealing "You Can't Sit with Us" as the lead single on July 26. The music video teaser for the lead single was released on August 1.

During an online media conference, Sunmi described the EP as "a fit for Sunmi" and expressed her desire to be an artist who cannot easily be copied. The singer also wanted to "give comfort, fun, and lightness to those who are feeling heavy and weighed down right now." The album's title 1/6 comes from the quote, "On the moon where gravity is one-sixth, will the weight of anxiety also be one-sixth?".

== Composition ==
The standard edition of 1/6 is slightly under twenty minutes long. The mini album includes six songs that showcase the singer's vocal skills. 1/6 is primarily a retro pop record, encompassing synthwave, dance-pop, bubblegum pop, city pop and 1980s mainstream music elements. NME observed that the EP "uses the lively retro elements to give insight into her personal struggles and anxieties." On it, Sunmi opens up about her experiences with borderline personality disorder. Through the six songs, Sunmi is talking about the deep emotions of life, such as sadness, happiness, anger, and confusion, which are "inevitable through the weight of life and the gravity of life." The mini album's texture has been described as lighter, brighter, dreamy, glossy and more free, departing from the theme of painful love and breakup of her second extended play Warning.

=== Songs ===
The opening track, "You Can't Sit with Us", is a synthwave-inspired song characterized by a distinct '80s dance-pop style with powerful synthesizer. The song features a fast beat, addictive chorus, Sunmi's "breathy" vocals and aside from demonstrating her abilities as a vocalist, the singer is also seen exercising her rap skills. Its title was taken from a line in the 2004 film Mean Girls. The track summarizes the frustration and anger one experiences when they are at a crossroads with their lover. "Sunny" is a retro and summer-inspired pop track that contains the "witty" lyrics of "Sunmi Sunmi" and the "cheerful" melody that makes the singer "feel free and light". The song employs vivid imagery of summer love and lazy days by the beach. "1/6" is a "laid-back" bubblegum pop and city pop track with a retro sound. Combining elements of indie rock and synth-pop, the song details moments where Sunmi has difficulties with her emotions and her borderline personality disorder. In the lyrics she asks if she can feel her heart lighten if she goes to the moon, where gravity is 1/6 as strong as it is on Earth.

The dance-pop and nu-disco track "Call" describes feeling disappointed by a lover and no longer trusting them. With the sound of a call waiting tone in the track, the singer is trying to have them answer the call so she can let them know she doesn't care anymore. "Narcissism" is an EDM-inspired pop track with synths that describe losing yourself and not recognizing the reflection in the mirror. In the second verse, the singer sings with her "dreamy" voice about the similarities of her features and senses among her reflection. The closing track, "Borderline", is an atmospheric, retro mid-tempo track, written by Sunmi about her experience with borderline personality disorder. Drawing influences from alternative rock, the song features a deep arrangement and the singer's "charming" low-pitched voice. Sunmi had previously performed the song at concerts, and also released a video for the track in 2020.

== Critical reception ==
Professional ratings
Review scores
Source	Rating
The Kraze	9.3/10
NME	4/5 stars
IZM	3.5/5 stars

Angela Patricia Suacillo of NME awarded the extended play 4 out of 5 stars, lauding Sunmi's ability to take "the lively, upbeat elements of synth- and dance pop" and use them to confront her anxieties. Sofia Gomez of The Kraze classified 1/6 as a retro inspired record dealing with the emotions and hardships while opening up about the singer's personal struggles. Writing for IZM, Honghyun Lee stated that Sunmi's "inner gaze is engraved more clearly than ever", and added that the mini album is "completely filled with talent and subjectivity".

=== Year-end lists ===
1/6 on year-end lists
Critic/Publication	List	Rank	Ref.
Nylon	The Top K-Pop Albums of 2021	Placed	
Omelete	15 Best K-Pop Albums of the Year	10	

== Accolades ==
Award and nominations for 1/6
Year	Organization	Award	Result	Ref.
2021	Asian Pop Music Awards	Best Album of the Year (Overseas)	Nominated	
2021	Asian Pop Music Awards	Top 20 Albums of the Year (Overseas)	Won	
2021	Asian Pop Music Awards	Best Female Artist (Overseas)	Nominated	

== Commercial performance ==
According to Hanteo Chart, 1/6 sold 10,692 copies on August 9 alone, managing to break Sunmi's previous first-week sales record of 2,911 (set by Warning) within just its first day of sales. The EP garnered also sales of 16,305 copies in the first week of release from August 9 to 15. In South Korea, the mini album debuted and peaked at number 5 for the week ending August 14, 2021. The set is her first top five title on her own and her second top 10.

== Track listing ==
All lyrics are written by Sunmi.

1/6 track listing
No.	Title	Lyrics	Music	Arrangement	Length
1.	"You Can't Sit with Us"	Sunmi	Melanie Fontana; Michel Schulz; Ross Golan	Lindgren	3:17
2.	"Sunny"	Sunmi	Jake K(ARTiffect); Maria Marcus; MCK(ARTiffect)	Jake K(ARTiffect); MCK(ARTiffect)	3:20
3.	"1/6" (6분의1)	Sunmi	Sunmi; Frants	Frants	3:41
4.	"Call"	Sunmi	Sunmi; Frants; El Capitxn	Frants; El Capitxn	2:45
5.	"Narcissism"	Sunmi	Sunmi; Frants	Frants	3:52
6.	"Borderline"	Sunmi	Sunmi; Frants	Frants	2:54
Total length:					19:51

== Charts ==
Chart performance for 1/6
Chart (2021)	Peak position
South Korean Albums (Gaon)	5

== Release history ==
Release formats for 1/6
Region	Date	Format	Label	Ref.
South Korea	August 6, 2021	CD, digital download, streaming	Abyss Company	
Various	August 6, 2021	CD, digital download, streaming	Abyss Company	
