= List of Inkigayo Chart winners (2018) =

Inkigayo Chart winners (2018)

Highlights
- Artist(s) with most wins: Twice (8)
- Song with highest score: "Fake Love" by BTS (10,918)

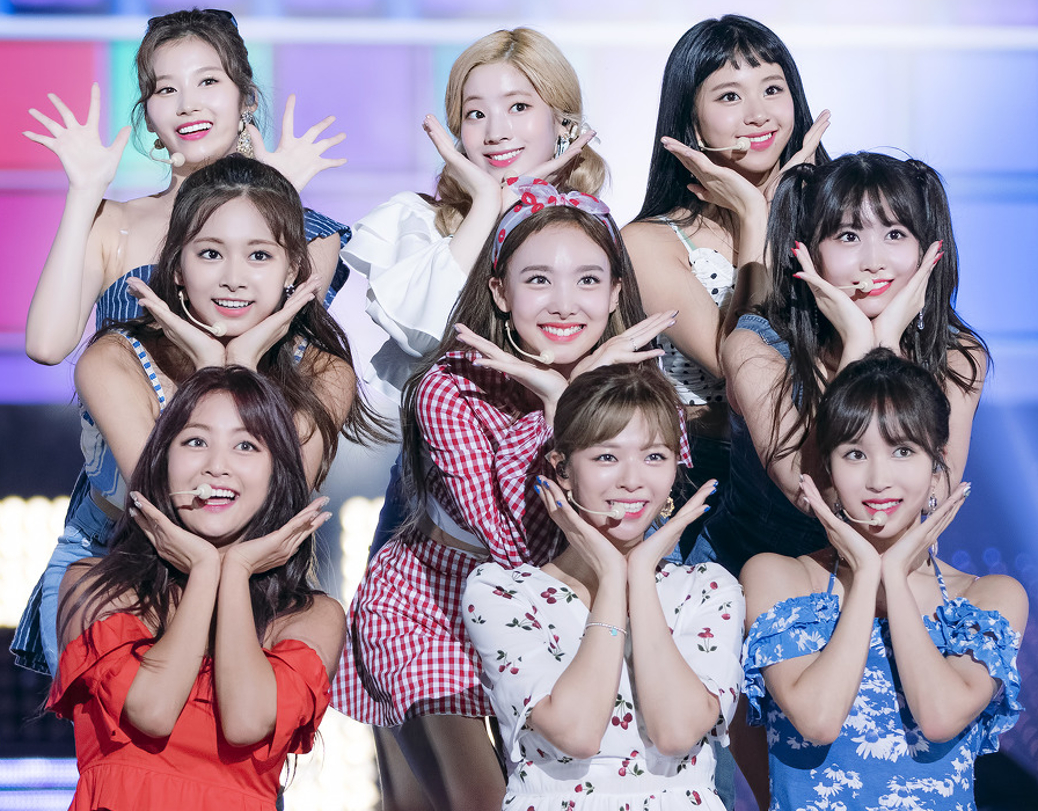
Girl group Twice ranked four singles at number one, the most of any act in 2018. Three of the songs achieved a Triple Crown.

The Inkigayo Chart is a music program record chart that gives an award to the best-performing single of the week in South Korea. In 2018, the chart measured digital performance in domestic online music services (5,500 points), social media via YouTube views (3,500 points), network on-air time (1,000 points), advanced viewer votes (500 points), and album sales (500 points) in its ranking methodology. Songs that spend three weeks at number one are awarded a Triple Crown and are removed from the chart and ineligible to win again. Got7 member Park Jin-young, Blackpink member Jisoo and NCT member Doyoung had hosted the show since February 5, 2017, and continued to do so until February 4, 2018. Actor Song Kang, Seventeen member Mingyu and DIA member Jung Chae-yeon were announced as new hosts from the February 18 broadcast. Kang left the show on November 4.

In 2018, there were 30 singles that ranked number one on the chart and 21 music acts received award trophies for this feat. Out of the 30 songs, 10 collected trophies for three weeks and earned a Triple Crown: Twice's "Heart Shaker", "What Is Love?", and "Dance the Night Away"; iKon's "Love Scenario"; Mamamoo's "Starry Night"; BTS's "Fake Love" and "Idol"; Blackpink's "Ddu-Du Ddu-Du"; IU's "Bbibbi"; and Jennie's "Solo". Six artists ranked more than one single at number one in 2018. Former Wonder Girls member Sunmi was the only soloist to have more than one chart-topper in 2018 with "Heroine" and "Siren" from her album Warning. Three boy groups ranked two singles at number one in 2018: iKon with "Love Scenario" and "Goodbye Road", Winner with "Everyday" and "Millions", and BTS with "Fake Love" and "Idol". Both singles by BTS ranked number one for three consecutive weeks each and achieved a triple crown. Their single "Fake Love" achieved 10,918 points on the June 3 broadcast making it the single with the highest score of the year. iKon's third consecutive win with "Love Scenario" granted the group their first Triple Crown since their debut.

Red Velvet had three singles rank number one on the chart: "Peek-a-Boo", "Bad Boy" and "Power Up". Meanwhile, girl group Twice ranked four singles at number one on the chart in 2018 with "Heart Shaker", "What Is Love?", "Dance the Night Away", and "Yes or Yes". The former three singles ranked number one for three weeks on the chart and achieved a triple crown. The four songs spent a total of eight weeks atop the chart making them the act with the most wins of the year. Three soloists ranked number one on the chart for the first time in 2018. Musician Paul Kim earned his first award with "Me After You" despite a lack of promotional activities on music shows. Blackpink member Jennie made her debut performance as a soloist on the November 25 broadcast of Inkigayo, where she won her first music show award with "Solo". Upon topping the ranking with "180 Degree", soloist Ben won her first music show award over nine years after her debut.

== Chart history ==
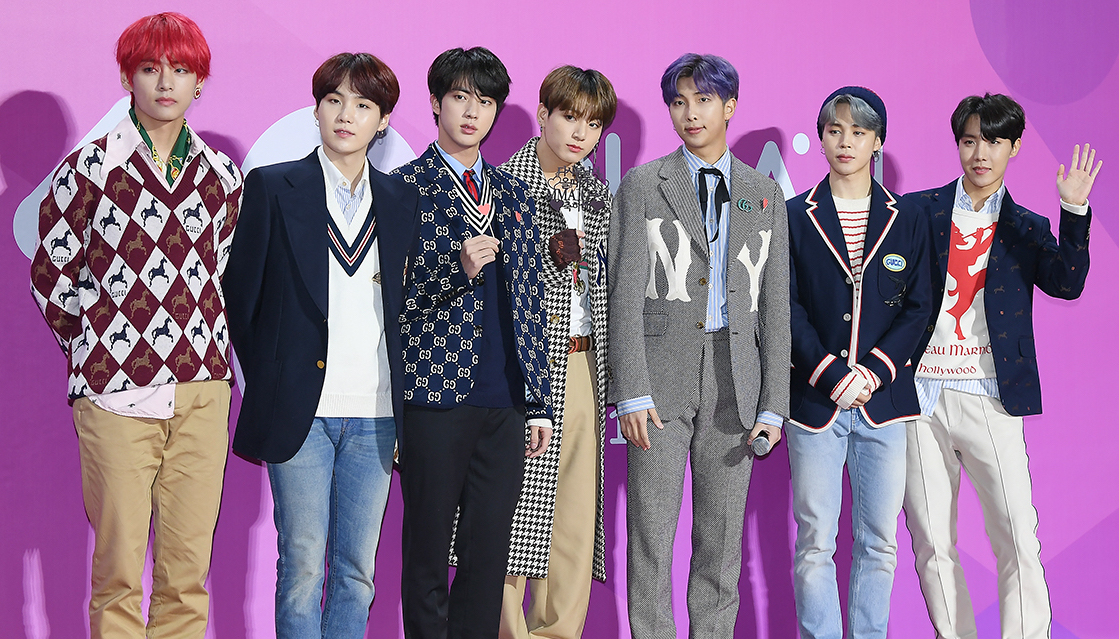
"Fake Love" accumulated 10,918 points on the June 3 broadcast, earning boy group BTS the highest score of 2018.

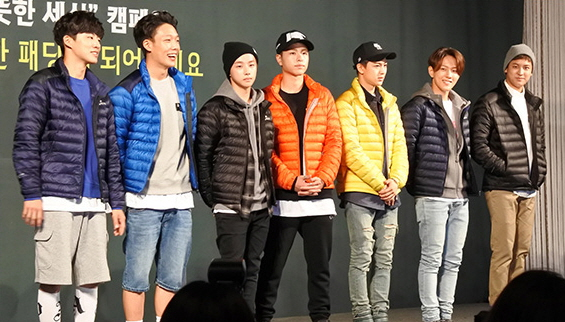
iKon earned its first Triple Crown of its career with "Love Scenario".

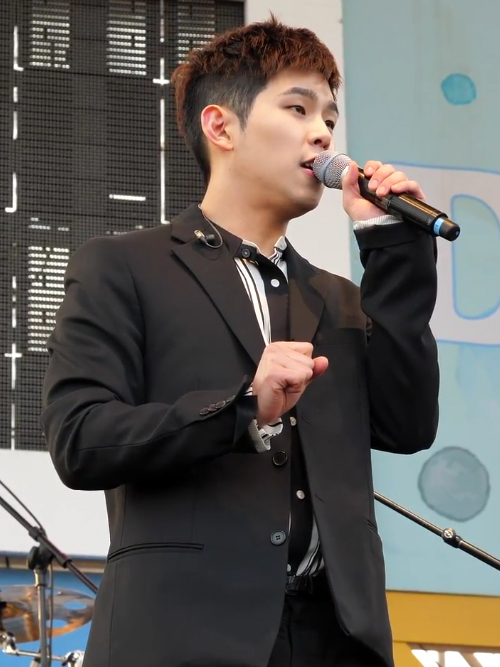
Musician Paul Kim earned his first music show award with "Me After You".

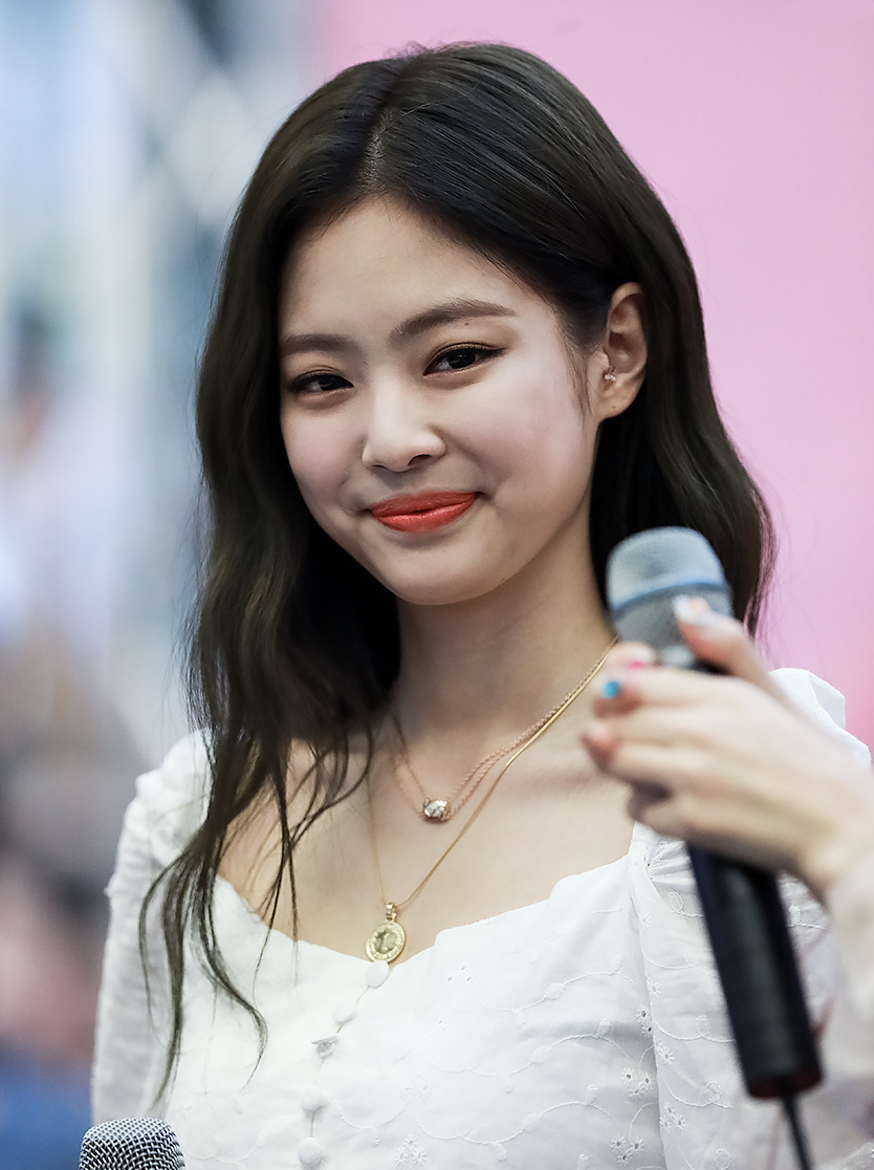
Blackpink member Jennie received her first music show award as a soloist with "Solo".

Key
†	Indicates the song achieved a Triple Crown
‡	Indicates the highest score of the year
—	No show was held

Chart history
Episode	Date	Artist	Song	Points	Ref.
940	January 7	Twice	"Heart Shaker" † (Note: "Heart Shaker" ranked number one for two weeks in 2017.)	7,926	
941	January 14	Red Velvet	"Peek-a-Boo"	6,477	
942	January 21	Infinite	"Tell Me"	6,428	
943	January 28	Sunmi	"Heroine"	7,017	
944	February 4	Sunmi	"Heroine"	7,146	
—	February 11	Red Velvet	"Bad Boy"	9,490	
945	February 18	iKon	"Love Scenario" †	8,543	
946	February 25	iKon	"Love Scenario" †	8,986	
947	March 4	iKon	"Love Scenario" †	9,091	
948	March 11	Momoland	"Bboom Bboom"	9,051	
949	March 18	Mamamoo	"Starry Night" †	9,158	
950	March 25	Mamamoo	"Starry Night" †	6,853	
951	April 1	Mamamoo	"Starry Night" †	7,265	
952	April 8	Momoland	"Bboom Bboom"	7,409	
953	April 15	Winner	"Everyday"	8,799	
954	April 22	Twice	"What Is Love?" †	10,527	
955	April 29	Twice	"What Is Love?" †	9,752	
956	May 6	Twice	"What Is Love?" †	9,575	
957	May 13	GFriend	"Time for the Moon Night"	8,811	
958	May 20	GFriend	"Time for the Moon Night"	6,972	
959	May 27	BTS	"Fake Love" †	7,068	
960	June 3	BTS	"Fake Love" †	10,918 ‡	
961	June 10	BTS	"Fake Love" †	8,681	
962	June 17	Bolbbalgan4	"Travel"	7,427	
963	June 24	Blackpink	"Ddu-Du Ddu-Du" †	6,886	
964	July 1	Blackpink	"Ddu-Du Ddu-Du" †	10,170	
965	July 8	Blackpink	"Ddu-Du Ddu-Du" †	9,753	
966	July 15	Apink	"I'm So Sick"	8,812	
967	July 22	Twice	"Dance the Night Away" †	10,571	
968	July 29	Twice	"Dance the Night Away" †	9,086	
969	August 5	Twice	"Dance the Night Away" †	9,221	
970	August 12	Zico	"SoulMate"	6,816	
—	August 19	Red Velvet	"Power Up"	10,494	
971	August 26	Red Velvet	"Power Up"	8,684	
972	September 2	BTS	"Idol" †	6,038	
973	September 9	BTS	"Idol" †	9,513	
974	September 16	BTS	"Idol" †	8,320	
975	September 23	Sunmi	"Siren"	7,426	
976	September 30	Got7	"Lullaby"	6,228	
977	October 7	Im Chang-jung	"There Has Never Been a Day I Haven't Loved You"	6,723	
978	October 14	iKon	"Goodbye Road"	8,953	
UHD Special	October 21	IU	"Bbibbi" †	9,341	
979	October 28	IU	"Bbibbi" †	7,905	
—	November 4	IU	"Bbibbi" †	9,648	
980	November 11	Paul Kim	"Me After You"	6,076	
—	November 18	Twice	"Yes or Yes"	10,303	
981	November 25	Jennie	"Solo" †	10,002	
982	December 2	Jennie	"Solo" †	9,719	
983	December 9	Mino	"Fiancé"	9,492	
984	December 16	Jennie	"Solo" †	7,113	
—	December 23	Ben	"180 Degree"	6,360	
—	December 30	Winner	"Millions"	7,314	
