= Siren (Sunmi song) =

2018 song by Sunmi

Single by Sunmi

from the EP Warning
- Language: Korean; English
- Released: September 4, 2018
- Genre: Pop; ambient
- Length: 3:19
- Label: Makeus Entertainment
- Songwriter: Sunmi
- Producers: Sunmi; Frants

Sunmi singles chronology
"Heroine" (2018)	"Siren" (2018)	"Noir" (2019)

Music videos
- "Siren" on YouTube

Professional ratings
Review scores
Source	Rating
IZM	3.5/5 stars

"Siren" (Korean: 사이렌; RR: Sairen) is a song recorded by the South Korean singer Sunmi for her second EP, Warning. Sunmi co-produced the song with Frants, and it was released on September 4, 2018, by Makeus Entertainment as the lead single from the EP. "Siren" is a pop track, in which Sunmi sings lyrics about a lover whose perception of her does not align with reality, ultimately leading her to end the relationship.

The song marks the final release of Sunmi's warning-themed trilogy, which began with "Gashina" and continued with "Heroine". It achieved significant success, reaching the top position on major charts in South Korea. Upon its debut, "Siren" peaked at number 1 on the Gaon Digital Chart, becoming Sunmi's second single to achieve this feat in South Korea.

== Background and release ==
About two to three years ago, “Siren” had been considered as a potential title track for Wonder Girls, but the song was ultimately shelved because JYP Entertainment decided that it “wouldn't sound as great if arranged for a band" since the Wonder Girls were promoting as a band and not as a dance group at the time, and "Why So Lonely" was chosen as the title track instead. "Siren" was ultimately released on September 4, 2018, and serves as the lead single from Sunmi's second EP Warning. Sunmi announced the song via her social media accounts on August 26, 2018:

"Sirens are used for warnings, and I was also inspired by sirens in mythology. They are known as beautiful but frightening presences that lure sailors in with their beautiful voices and drag them down to the bottom of the ocean. The mermaids that appeared in Pirates of the Caribbean: On Stranger Tides were also sirens. I think I’ll be able to take that unique concept and express it well… the reason sirens stuck out to me is that they’re what are used in the most dangerous of situations. And the origin of the word ‘Siren’ is that mermaid figure. The song itself has an ambiguous meaning, so I wanted to use that word."

— Sunmi explaining the use of the word "Siren",

== Composition ==
"Siren" was written by Sunmi and produced by her and Frants. It runs for three minutes and nineteen seconds. "Siren" was described as "an '80s-evoking ambient pop track". Lyrically, it is about a lover whose image of her does not fit with reality, resulting in her ending the relationship.

== Commercial performance ==
"Siren" achieved the perfect all-kill status, a status where a song is simultaneously topping all charts, both daily and realtime. The song topped Gaon Digital Chart for a total of 2 consecutive weeks, becoming her second number-one single in South Korea.

== Music video ==
The music video, directed by Choi Yongseok, was released along with the song and features different facets of Sunmi, all of which make one version face the reality of her relationship. Sunmi performs a choreographed powerful dance and also appears in several looks, with Billboard stating that the outfits "evoke mythological creatures and mermaids, while hair accessories like crowns and a “priority” shipping label hair-tie emphasize the domineering nature of the track".

The video currently has over 50 million views.

== Credits and personnel ==
Credits adapted from Tidal.

- Sunmi - vocals, songwriter, producer
- Frants – producer

== Charts ==
=== Weekly charts ===
Chart (2018)	Peak position
Singapore (RIAS)	25
South Korea (Gaon Digital Chart)	1
South Korea (K-pop Hot 100)	1
US World Digital Songs (Billboard)	5

=== Monthly charts ===
Chart (September 2018)	Peak position
South Korea (Gaon Digital Chart)	1

=== Year-end charts ===
Chart (2018)	Position
South Korea (Circle)	60

== Accolades ==
Year-end lists
Critic/Publication	List	Rank	Ref.
SBS	Top 100 Asian pop songs of 2018	11	

=== Awards and nominations ===
Year	Award	Category	Result	Ref.
2018	1st Korea Popular Music Awards	Best Digital Song	Nominated	
2018	1st Korea Popular Music Awards	Best Solo Dance Track	Nominated	
2018	20th Mnet Asian Music Awards	Best Dance Performance – Female Solo	Nominated	
2019	8th Gaon Chart Music Awards	Song of the Year – September	Nominated	
2019	28th Seoul Music Awards	Bonsang Award	Nominated	

=== Music program awards ===
Program	Date	Ref.
M Countdown (Mnet)	September 13, 2018	
M Countdown (Mnet)	September 20, 2018	
Show Champion (MBC Music)	September 19, 2019	
Music Bank (KBS)	September 21, 2018	
Show! Music Core (MBC)	September 22, 2018	
Inkigayo (SBS)	September 23, 2018	

== Release history ==
Region	Date	Format	Label
Various	September 4, 2018	Digital download, streaming	Makeus Entertainment

== See also ==
- List of Gaon Digital Chart number ones of 2018
- List of Inkigayo Chart winners (2018)
- List of Kpop Hot 100 number ones
- List of M Countdown Chart winners (2018)
