= List of M Countdown Chart winners (2018) =

Winners of South Korean music program M Countdown

M Countdown Chart winners (2018)

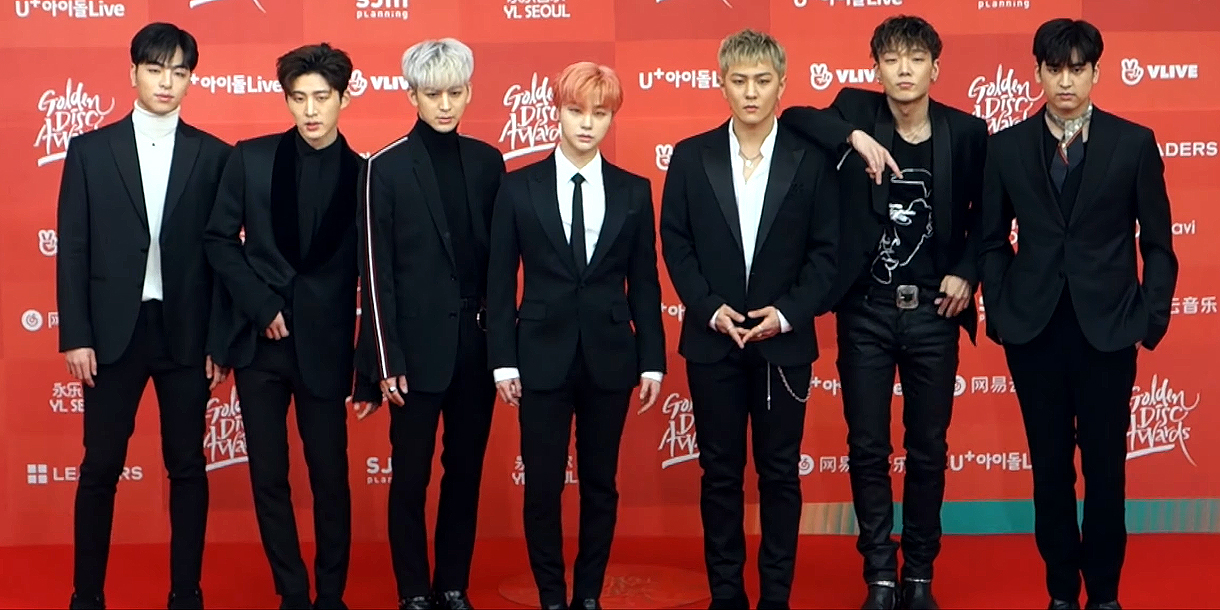
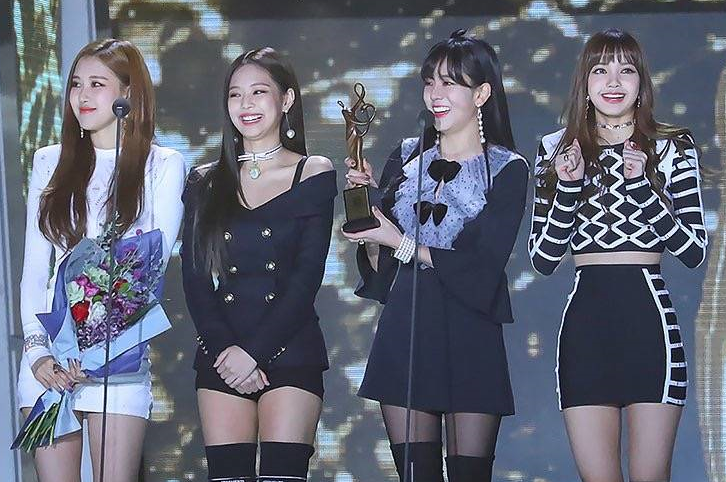
iKon (top) and Blackpink (bottom) achieved the only triple crowns of the year with "Love Scenario" and "Ddu-Du Ddu-Du" respectively.
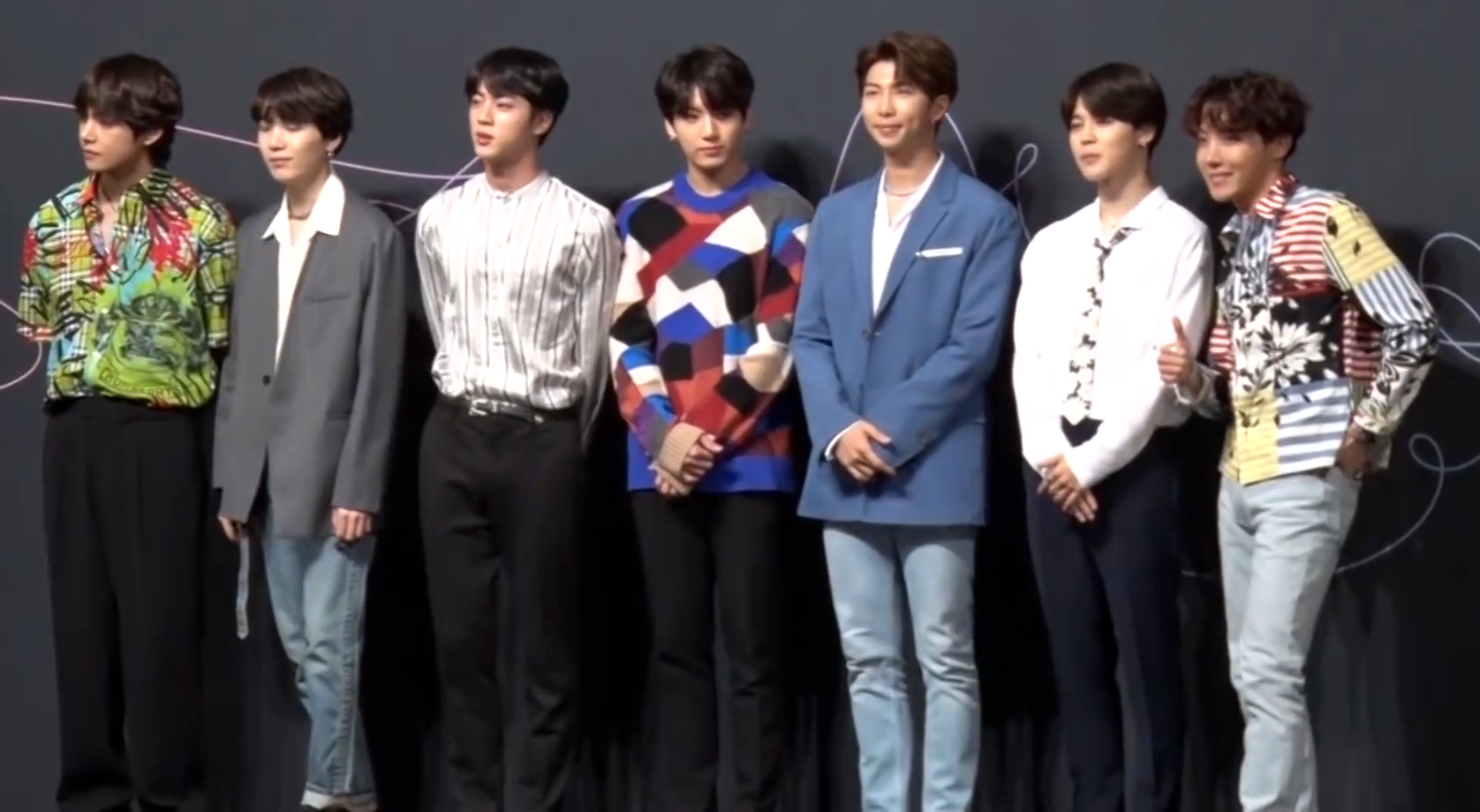
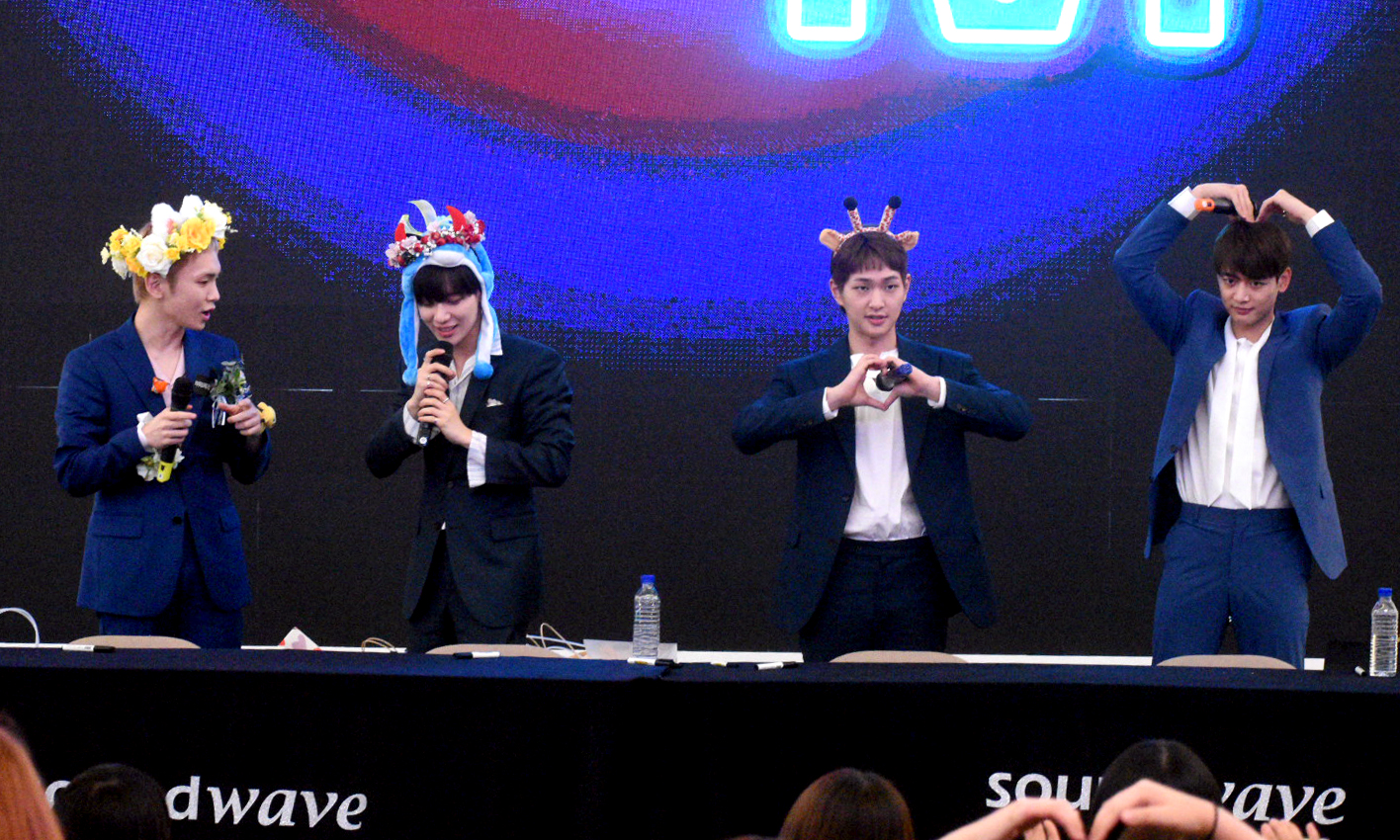
"Fake Love" by BTS (top) and "I Want You" by Shinee (bottom) earned the only perfect scores of the year, on episodes 572 and 575 respectively.

The M Countdown Chart is a record chart on the South Korean Mnet television music program M Countdown. Every week, the show awards the best-performing single on the chart in the country during its live broadcast.

In 2018, 35 singles ranked number one on the chart and 21 music acts were awarded first-place trophies. Two songs collected trophies for three weeks and achieved a triple crown: "Love Scenario" by iKon, and "Ddu-Du Ddu-Du" by Blackpink. Of all releases for the year, only two songs earned a perfect score of 11,000 points: "Fake Love" by BTS and "I Want You" by Shinee.

== Scoring system ==
=== 11 June 2015 – 12 April 2018 ===
Scoring System: Digital Music Sales (50%), Album Sales (15%), Social Media Score (YouTube official music video views + SNS buzz) (15%), Popularity Score (global fan votes + age range preference) (10%), Mnet Broadcast Score (10%) + SMS Voting Score (10%).

=== 26 April 2018 – 21 May 2020 ===
Scoring System: Digital Music Sales (45%), Album Sales (15%), Social Media Score (YouTube official music video views + SNS buzz) (20%), Global Fan Votes (10%), Mnet Broadcast Score (10%), SMS Live Vote 10%.

== Chart history ==
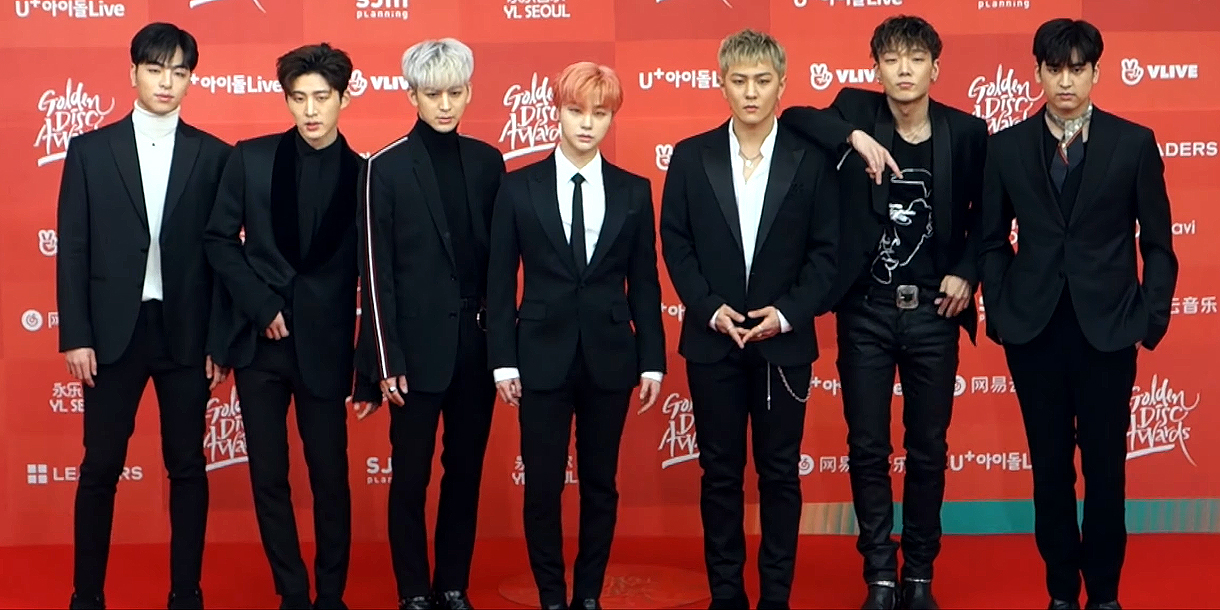
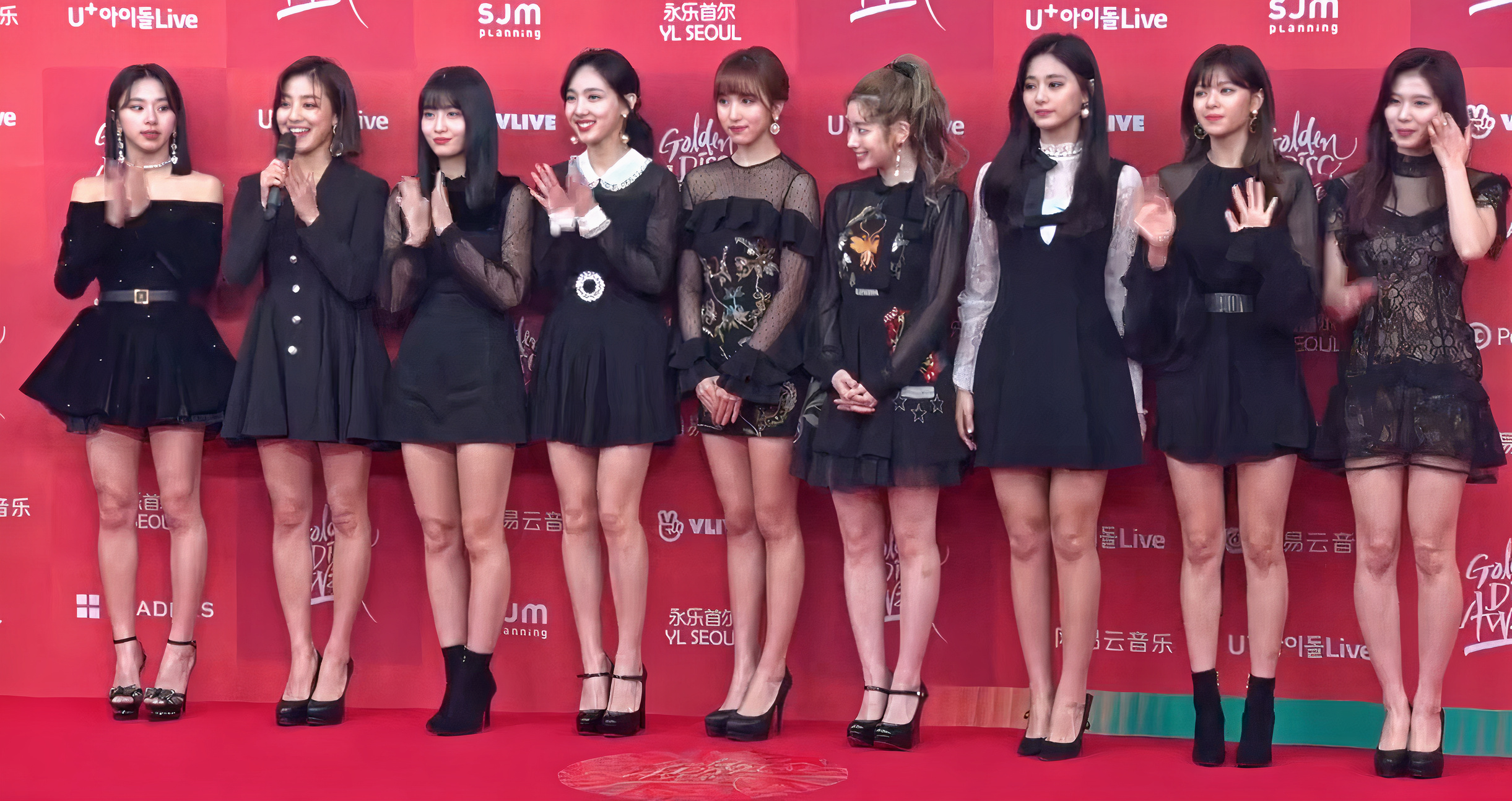
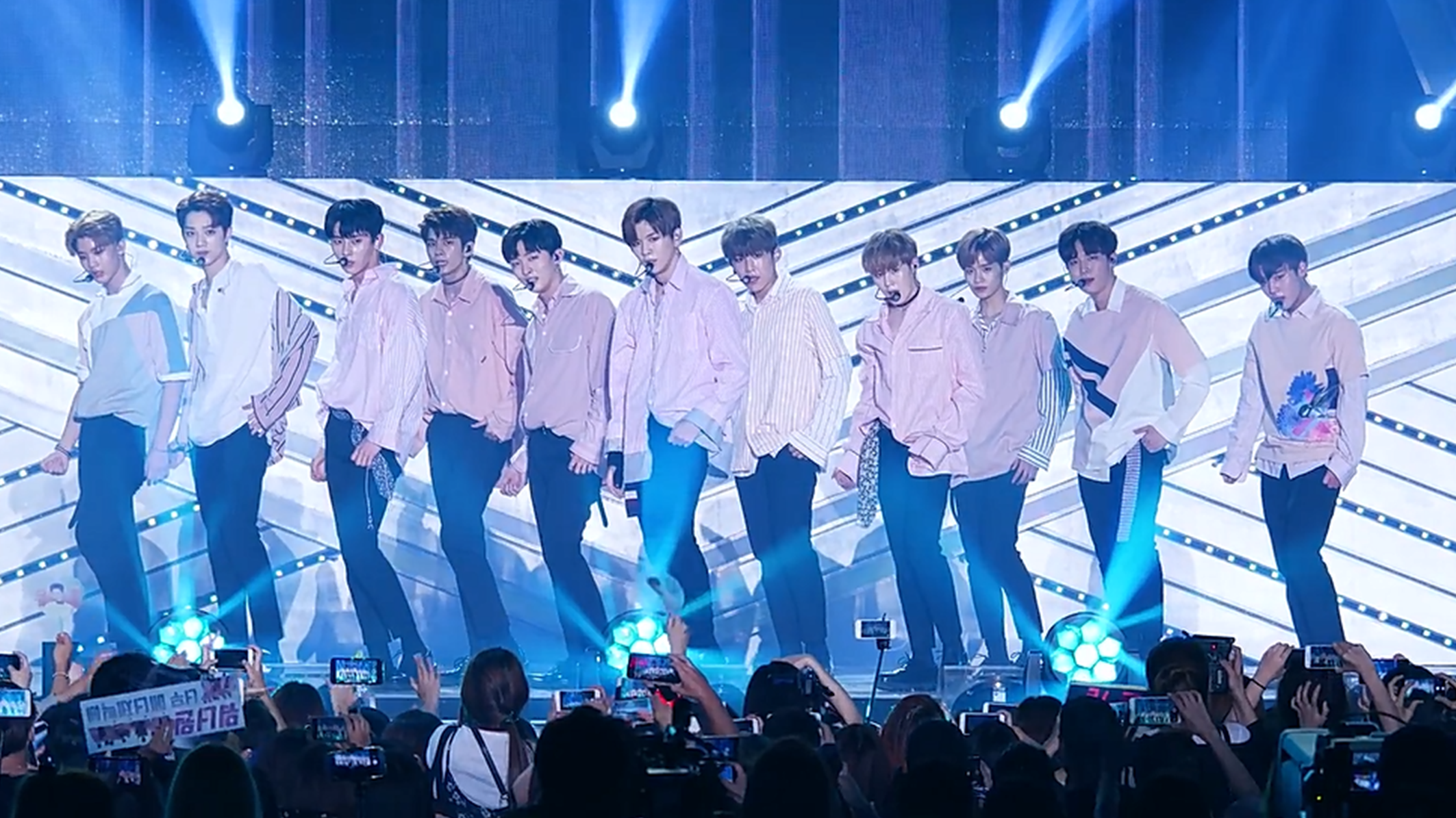
iKon (top), Twice (center), and Wanna One (bottom) each ranked three singles at number one with iKon garnering a combined six wins, the most of any act in 2018.

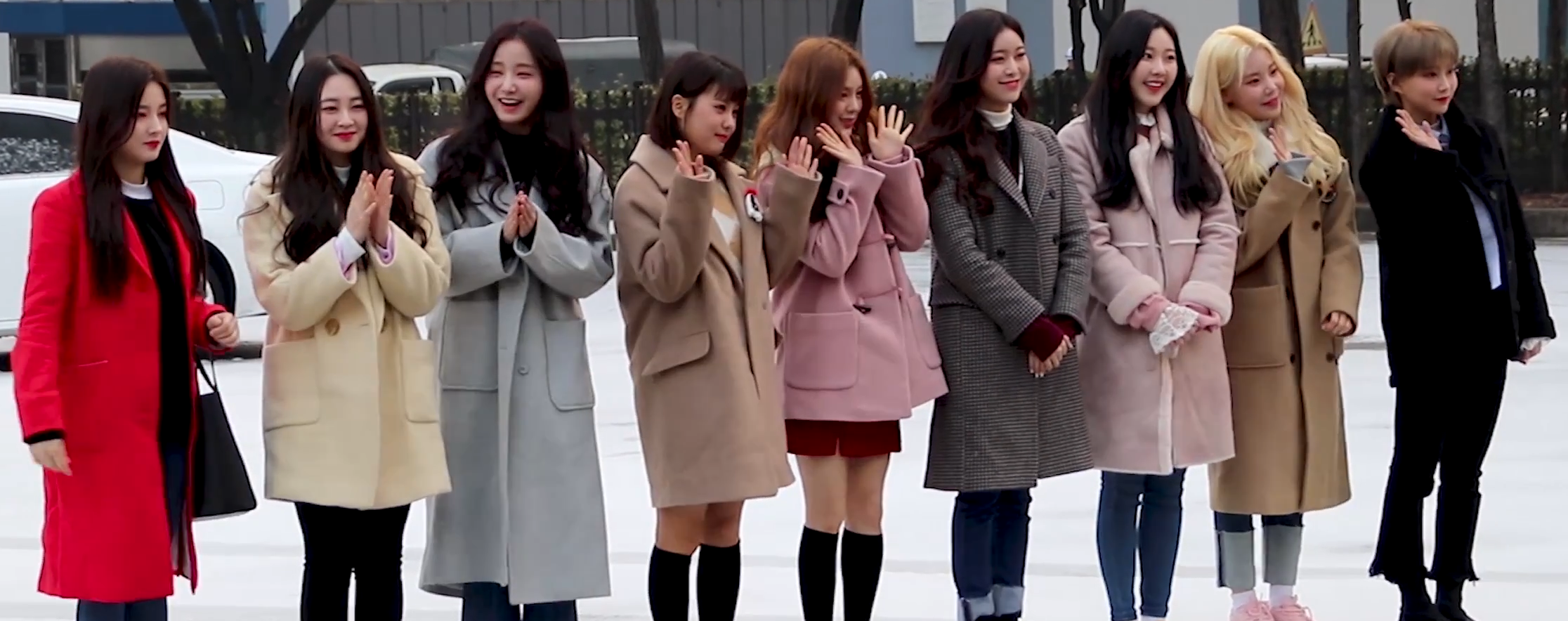
Momoland achieved their first ever music show win with "Bboom Bboom" on episode 553.

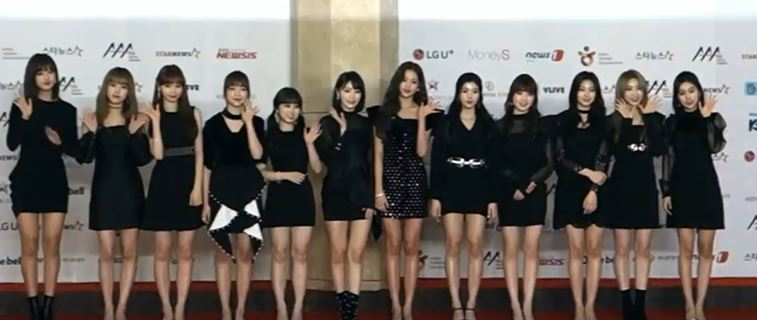
Iz*One received their first ever music show win for their debut single "La Vie en Rose" on episode 595.

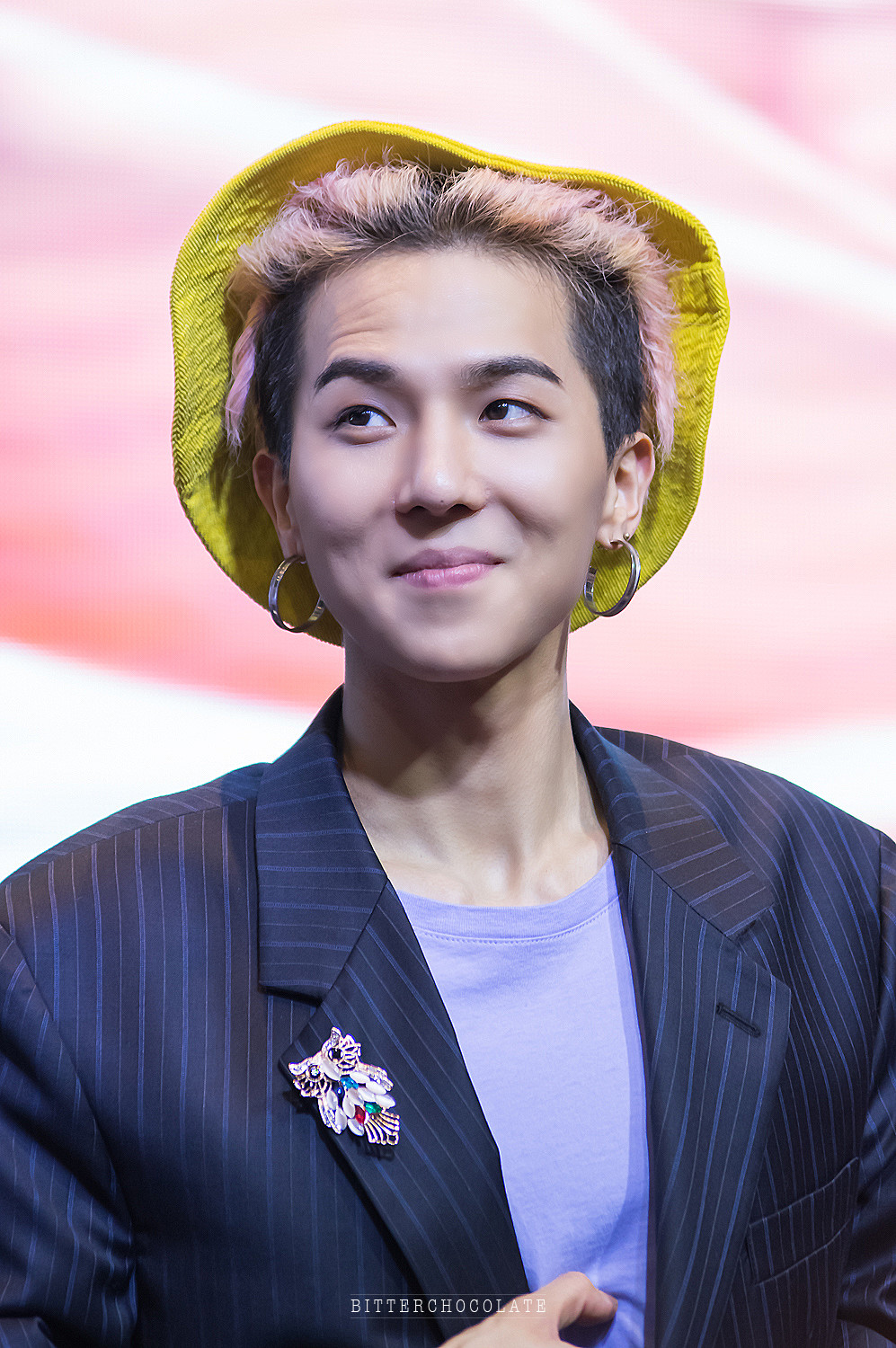
Mino, of boy group Winner, received his first music show award as a soloist for "Fiancé" on episode 598.

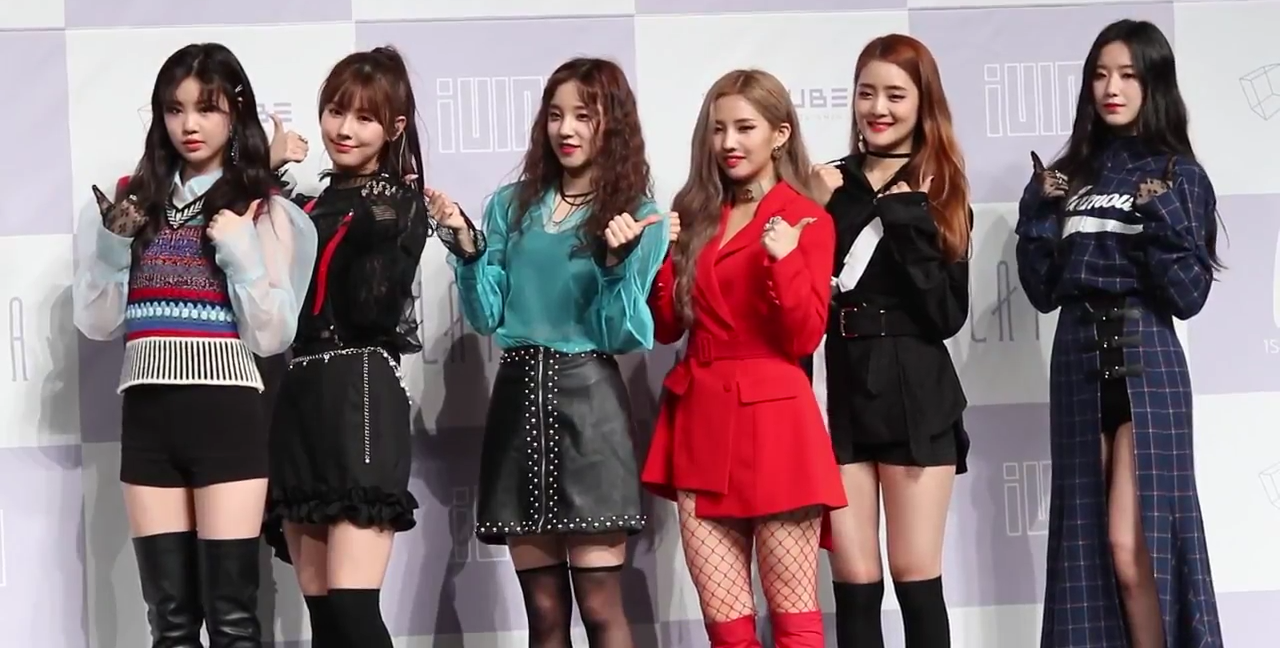
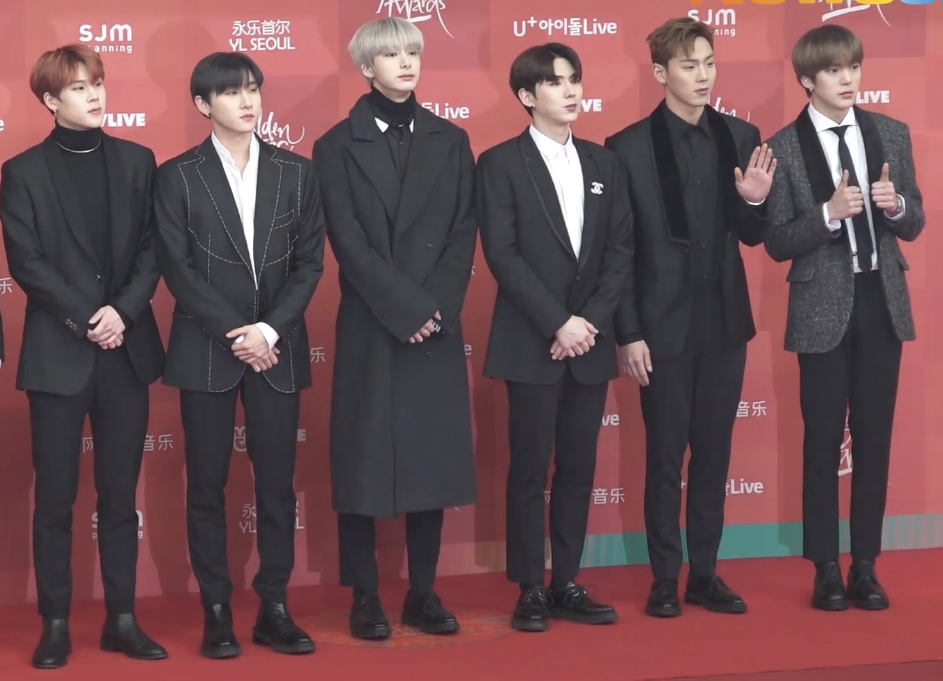
(G)I-dle (top) and Monsta X (bottom) received their first ever M Countdown trophies on episodes 571 and 594 with "Latata" and "Shoot Out" respectively.

Key
	Triple Crown
	Highest score of the year
—	No show was held

Episode	Date	Artist	Song	Points	Ref.
—	January 4	No Broadcast or Winner			
553	January 11	Momoland	"Bboom Bboom"	7,811	
554	January 18	Infinite	"Tell Me"	10,554	
555	January 25	Sunmi	"Heroine"	7,919	
556	February 1	iKon	"Love Scenario"	7,789	
557	February 8	Red Velvet	"Bad Boy"	10,032	
558	February 15	Red Velvet	"Bad Boy"	—N/a	
559	February 22	Momoland	"Bboom Bboom"	8,834	
560	March 1	iKon	"Love Scenario"	8,467	
561	March 8	iKon	"Love Scenario"	8,001	
562	March 15	Mamamoo	"Starry Night"	9,820	
563	March 22	Mamamoo	"Starry Night"	7,938	
564	March 29	Wanna One	"Boomerang"	10,805	
565	April 5	Wanna One	"Boomerang"	9,981	
566	April 12	Winner	"Everyday"	9,687	
567	April 19	Twice	"What Is Love?"	—N/a	
568	April 26	Twice	"What Is Love?"	9,360	
569	May 3	Winner	"Everyday"	7,463	
570	May 10	GFriend	"Time for the Moon Night"	10,700	
—	May 17	No Broadcast or Winner			
571	May 24	(G)I-dle	"Latata"	8,183	
572	May 31	BTS	"Fake Love"	11,000	
573	June 7	BTS	"Fake Love"	9,666	
574	June 14	Wanna One	"Light"	10,320	
575	June 21	Shinee	"I Want You"	11,000	
576	June 28	Blackpink	"Ddu-Du Ddu-Du"	8,706	
577	July 5	Blackpink	"Ddu-Du Ddu-Du"	—N/a	
578	July 12	Blackpink	"Ddu-Du Ddu-Du"	—N/a	
579	July 19	Twice	"Dance the Night Away"	10,933	
580	July 26	Seventeen	"Oh My!"	8,546	
581	August 2	Mamamoo	"Egotistic"	7,731	
582	August 9	iKon	"Killing Me"	7,888	
—	August 16	M Countdown No.1 Special			
583	August 23	Red Velvet	"Power Up"	8,761	
584	August 24	KCON 2018 LA x M COUNTDOWN, No Winner			
585	August 30	Red Velvet	"Power Up"	8,444	
586	September 6	(G)I-dle	"Hann"	7,213	
587	September 13	Sunmi	"Siren"	7,624	
588	September 20	Sunmi	"Siren"	7,381	
589	September 27	Got7	"Lullaby"	—N/a	
590	October 4	Got7	"Lullaby"	10,595	
591	October 11	iKon	"Goodbye Road"	—N/a	
592	October 18	iKon	"Goodbye Road"	8,286	
593	October 25	NCT 127	"Regular"	10,000	
594	November 1	Monsta X	"Shoot Out"	6,349	
595	November 8	Iz*One	"La Vie en Rose"	10,884	
596	November 15	Twice	"Yes or Yes"	8,695	
—	November 22	Special Broadcast of Wanna One Comeback Show			
597	November 29	Wanna One	"Spring Breeze"	—N/a	
598	December 6	Mino	"Fiancé"	—N/a	
—	December 13	Special Edition (KCON Japan 2018)			
—	December 20	Special Edition (KCON Japan 2018)			
599	December 27	Winner	"Millions"	—N/a	
