= Borderline (Sunmi song) =

2021 song by Sunmi

Song by Sunmi

from the album 1/6
- Language: English
- Released: August 6, 2021
- Genre: Alternative rock; indie rock
- Length: 2:54
- Label: Abyss Company
- Composers: Sunmi; Frants
- Lyricist: Sunmi

Special video
- "Borderline" on YouTube

"Borderline" is a song recorded by South Korean singer-songwriter Sunmi. It is the closing track on her third extended play 1/6 (2021), which was released on August 6, 2021, through Abyss Company. The song was written by Sunmi and its composer, Frants. "Borderline" is mid-tempo alternative rock track that confronts the singer's experience with borderline personality disorder. Sunmi won an award for "Best Lyricist (Overseas)" with the track at the 2021 Asian Pop Music Awards.

== Background ==
The song was debuted on her Warning Tour and was not originally planned to be released. In February 2019, the singer shared the lyrics for "Borderline". During a March 2019 interview with Pop Crush, Sunmi described the track saying "It's about me, but I think it's a song everyone can relate to when they hear it." On August 19, 2020, the special video for "Borderline" was released. On August 28, the singer uploaded an interview on her YouTube channel, where she details the reasons behind the lyrics and conceptual choices for the special video.

When I started making Borderline, I was quite afraid to reveal my injury from the past bcuz all the words in this song are true and honest feelings of mine. I realized that many people, not just me, were struggling with this feeling. I still don’t know how to deal with the remains, but I’m fine now and it' bcuz you gave me the courage to express everything honestly. Thank u #miyane. sincerely."

— Sunmi on the making of "Borderline", Twitter

== Composition and reception ==
"Borderline" was written by Sunmi and its composer, Frants. The song is an atmospheric, retro, mid-tempo track about her experience with Borderline Personality Disorder. Drawing influences from alternative rock and indie rock the track features a deep arrangement and the singer's "charming" low-pitched voice. In terms of musical notation, the song is composed in the key of A minor, with a tempo of 113 beats per minute, and runs for two minutes and fifty-four seconds. Angela Patricia Suacillo from NME noted that the song "showcases Sunmi’s ability to paint vivid imagery through her songwriting." Many music critics noted the track for being "raw" and "emotionally honest" about something so personal to Sunmi, giving exposure and awareness to her disorder.

== Accolades ==
Award and nominations for "Borderline"
Year	Organization	Award	Result	Ref.
2021	Asian Pop Music Awards	Best Lyricist (Overseas)	Won	

== Live performances ==
"Borderline" was featured on the setlist of Sunmi's Warning Tour in 2019. On March 13, 2021, the singer performed the song on You Hee-yeol's Sketchbook. During the OUTNOW Unlimited, held on August 8, 2021, the singer performed a medley of "Narcissism" and "Borderline".

== Credits and personnel ==
Credits are adapted from Melon,

- Sunmi – Vocals, songwriter
- Frants – Songwriter, bass, keyboard, computer programming
- Ahn Sung Hoon – Guitar
- DR in idiotape – Drums
- Jo Sang Hyun – Audio mixing, record engineering
- Oh Hye Seok – Record engineering
- Choi Ja Yeon - Record engineering
- Kwon Nam-woo – Audio mastering

== Release history ==
Release formats for "Borderline"
Region	Date	Format	Label	Ref.
South Korea	August 6, 2021	Digital download, streaming	Abyss Company	
Various	August 6, 2021	Digital download, streaming	Abyss Company	
