= Solo (Jennie song) =

2018 debut single by Jennie

- Digital cover

Single by Jennie
- Language: Korean; English
- Released: November 12, 2018
- Studio: The Black Label (Seoul)
- Genre: Pop; dance; hip hop
- Length: 2:50
- Label: YG; Interscope
- Composers: Teddy; 24
- Lyricist: Teddy

Jennie singles chronology
"Black" (2013)	"Solo" (2018)	"You & Me" (2023)

Physical edition cover
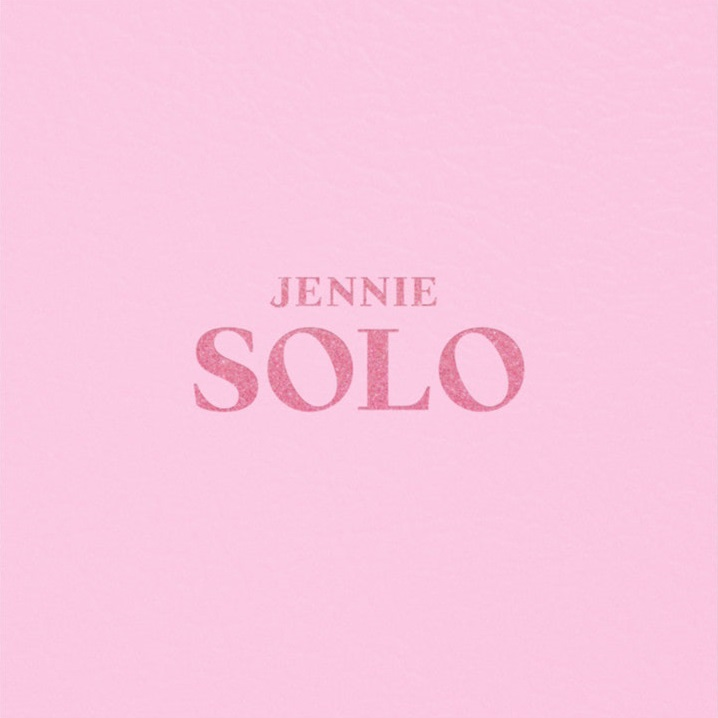

Music video
- "Solo" on YouTube

"Solo" is the debut solo single by South Korean singer and rapper Jennie. It was released through YG Entertainment and Interscope on November 12, 2018. The song was written by Teddy and composed by him alongside 24. Sonically, "Solo" is a dance, pop, and hip hop song with EDM elements. Its lyrical content revolves around themes of independence following a break-up.

"Solo" was a commercial success in South Korea, peaking atop the Gaon Digital Chart and the Billboard K-pop Hot 100 for two weeks. Internationally, it made Jennie the first lead female K-pop soloist to top the Billboard World Digital Songs chart in the United States, and debuted on the charts of several other countries, including Canada, Japan, Malaysia, New Zealand, Scotland, Singapore and the United Kingdom. It has received three platinum certifications from the Korea Music Content Association (KMCA) for surpassing 2.5 million digital units, 250,000 physical units, and 100 million streams, as well as gold certifications from SNEP, the Recording Industry Association of Japan (RIAJ) and Recorded Music NZ (RMNZ).

An accompanying music video for the song was directed by Han Sa-min and uploaded to Blackpink's YouTube channel simultaneously with the single's release. The video was filmed in the United Kingdom and depicts Jennie's transformation from an innocent to strong independent woman. In 2024, it became the first music video by a female K-pop soloist to reach one billion views on the platform. Jennie promoted "Solo" with performances on the South Korean music programs Inkigayo and Show! Music Core, as well as Blackpink's In Your Area World Tour. The song won several accolades, including Best Digital Song at the 34th Golden Disc Awards.

== Background and release ==
On October 18, 2018, YG announced that all Blackpink members were preparing solo releases, with Jennie to release a song in November 2018. On October 27, YG released a promotional poster on various social media accounts. A 23-second teaser video was uploaded one day later onto Blackpink's official YouTube channel. The clip shows Jennie lying on a bed and repeatedly mentioning her name. The second teaser was uploaded one week later, showing her performing in various clothes in a photo studio. The third and last teaser was uploaded four days prior to the single's release, showing her with different outfits in various locations.

"Solo" was released for digital download and streaming on November 12, 2018, through YG and Interscope. A physical version of the single was released on November 18, 2018, featuring the song and its instrumental. Alongside the CD, a 72-page photobook, a double-sided poster, a random photocard and a lyrics postcard were released in a special version.

== Recording and composition ==
"Solo"
A 20-second sample of "Solo", which incorporates EDM synths and beat drops, energetic hip hop inspired instrumentations with high-pitched whistle effects over "mellow and soaring" vocals.

In a press conference held on November 12, 2018, Jennie talked about the song's creation, stating, "When I'm at Teddy's studio, he'll make a song and I'll just record the guide for it. It wasn't that he was working on a solo track for me. He just said, 'I have something new, let's try it.' So I recorded the song he had, and it happened to be a great fit". She also described the meaning behind the song as "When you're dating someone, you tend to present what the other person wants rather than your true self. I wanted to express that feeling. Rather than the heart wound coming from a breakup, I wanted to express myself more freely". While Jennie is not credited as a songwriter, she conceived the concept behind the song. She told the Hollywood Reporter, "So, I've input a lot of my ideas into the concept, the style and everything. So, I've had a strong connection from the beginning, I guess." Jennie explained how "Solo" was written by Teddy and composed by him alongside 24. The song is composed in the key of E-flat minor in a tempo 95 beats per minute and runs for 2:50. It has been described as a dance, pop and hip hop song, with EDM elements. SBS' Kang Kyung-yoon noted that the lyrics follow two themes; a weak introverted girl and an "independent yet strong woman.

== Accolades ==
Awards and nominations for "Solo"
Year	Organization	Award	Result	Ref.
2019	Gaon Chart Music Awards	Artist of the Year – Digital Music (November)	Won	
2019	Mnet Asian Music Awards	Best Dance Performance Solo	Nominated	
2019	Mnet Asian Music Awards	Song of the Year	Nominated	
2020	Golden Disc Awards	Best Digital Song (Bonsang)	Won	
2020	Golden Disc Awards	Song of the Year (Daesang)	Nominated	

Music program awards
Program	Date	Ref.
Inkigayo	November 25, 2018	
Inkigayo	December 2, 2018	
Inkigayo	December 16, 2018	

== Commercial performance ==
"Solo" debuted at number one on the Gaon Digital Chart on the week ending November 17. Overall, the song stayed in the top ten of the chart for 13 consecutive weeks and spent 33 weeks in the top 100 of the chart. It furthermore topped the component Download and Streaming chart. The CD release of the single charted at number two of the Gaon Album Chart, selling more than 45,000 copies in two months, making it the 100th best-selling album of 2018. Eventually "Solo" became the 86th and 35th best-performing song of 2018 and 2019 respectively in South Korea. The song was certified platinum by the Korea Music Content Association (KMCA) both for surpassing 100 million streams on June 6, 2019, and for 2.5 million paid digital downloads on March 12, 2020. On July 11, 2024, the CD release was certified platinum by the KMCA for surpassing 250,000 copies sold. The song entered the Billboard K-pop Hot 100 on the chart issue dated November 24 at number one. The following week it dropped to number ten, but reached the top again the following week. It spent 25 weeks on the chart. The song further reached number one in Singapore and Malaysia. In Japan, "Solo" debuted and peaked at number 22 on the Billboard Japan Hot 100 in the week ending November 26.

In the United States, "Solo" debuted at number three on Billboard's World Digital Song Sales chart and achieved 4.5 million streams with only four days of tracking after its release. The following week ending November 22, it earned 5.3 million streams (up 17%) for its first full tracking week. The song rose to number one on the World Digital Song Sales chart with 4,000 downloads sold, bringing its total tally to 9,000 downloads since release. With this, Jennie became the first solo female K-pop act as a lead artist and the second overall to top the chart, after CL with her feature on Psy's "Daddy" (2015). Jennie was the sixth Korean solo act to hit number one, after Psy, CL, G-Dragon, Taeyang, and J-Hope. According to Nielsen Music, the track sold 10,000 downloads in the U.S. as of November 29 and garnered more than 5 million streams since its release. In total, it spent 25 weeks charting on the World Digital Song Sales chart. "Solo" also reached the single charts in Canada and Scotland, while reaching the New Zealand Hot Singles chart. In the United Kingdom, it entered the UK download component chart at number 72 and earned 154,000 UK chart units as of October 2024, the third-most for any Blackpink member's solo single after her own "One of the Girls" (2023) and Lisa's "Money" (2021). The song surpassed Psy's "Gangnam Style" as the most streamed song by a Korean solo artist on Spotify in October 2020, and became the first song by a Korean solo artist to reach 300 million streams in June 2021. It surpassed 500 million streams on the platform in June 2023, making Jennie the first Korean soloist to reach the milestone in history.

== Music video ==
An accompanying music video for the song was directed by Han Sa-min and shot in the United Kingdom. Within five hours of its release on YouTube, the video surpassed four million views. It achieved 100 million views in only 23 days, the shortest time period ever for any solo female K-pop singer. "Solo" surpassed 300 million views in just six months, becoming the first music video by a Korean female soloist to reach the milestone. On February 29, 2024, the music video surpassed one billion views on YouTube. With this, Jennie became the first female solo K-pop artist in history to have a music video reach one billion views, and only the second-ever solo K-pop artist to do so after Psy, whose "Gangnam Style" crossed the threshold in 2012.

== Live performances and promotion ==
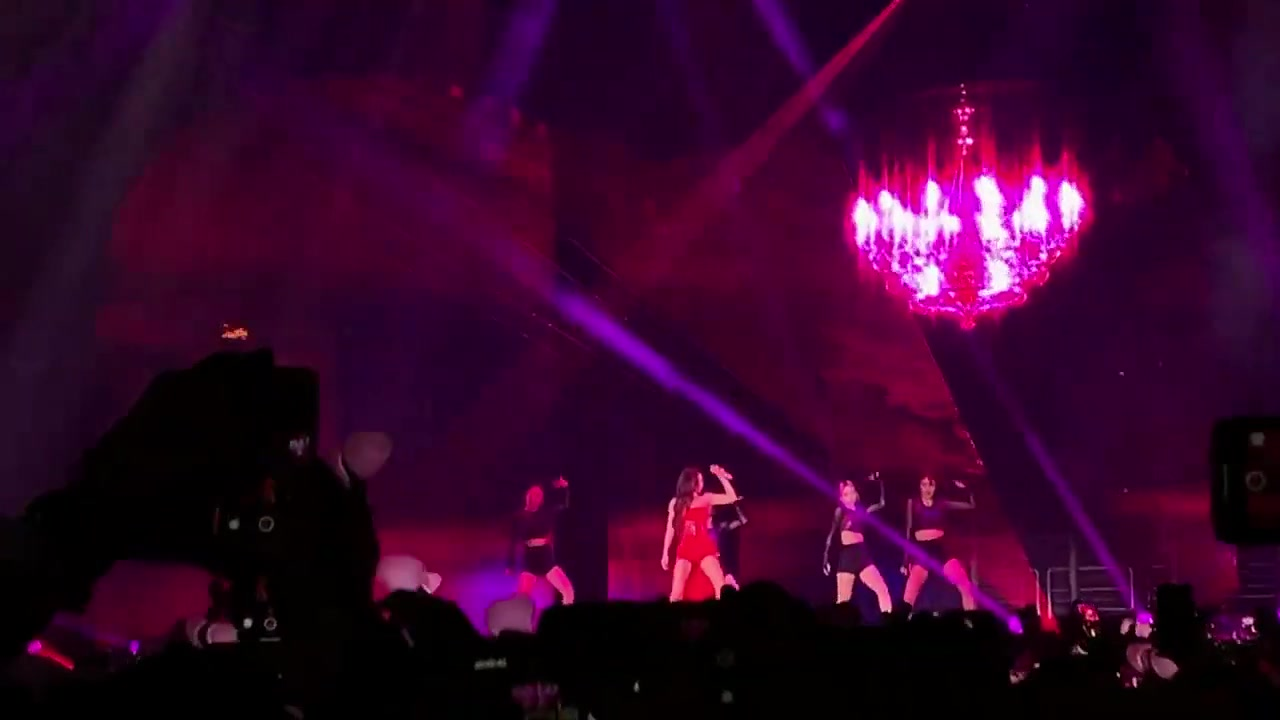
Jennie performing "Solo" during the In Your Area World Tour in Los Angeles, 2019

Because her first appearance as a solo artist on SBS' Inkigayo and MBC Show! Music Core was postponed as broadcasters had cancelled all the performances scheduled for that week, YG Entertainment uploaded choreography videos for the song on YouTube for fans. Its dance was choreographed by Kiel Tutin, Kyle Hanagami, and Shackkings. YG Entertainment then aired the Jennie – 'Solo' Diary series on YouTube, sharing glimpses of her work throughout the promotion period of the single.

Jennie performed "Solo" on several occasions. The single was first performed by Jennie during Blackpink's concert in Seoul's Olympic Gymnastics Arena on November 10 and 11, 2018. She performed "Solo" four times in November and December at SBS' Inkigayo and won three times. In the same month, "Solo" was performed at the SBS Gayo Daejeon, alongside "Ddu-Du Ddu-Du". Furthermore, "Solo" was performed during Blackpink's debut Coachella stage on April 12, 2019. A live version of "Solo" which was recorded on December 24, 2018, was included on Blackpink's first live album Blackpink Arena Tour 2018 "Special Final In Kyocera Dome Osaka", which was released on March 22, 2019, through YGEX. On July 2, 2023, Jennie performed "Solo" during Blackpink's set as the headlining act of BST Hyde Park in London.

== Remix version ==
On January 31, 2021, Jennie performed a remix version of "Solo" during Blackpink's livestream concert, The Show. The remix version included a new rap verse written by Jennie and an extended tropical dance break. The remix version of the song was released on June 1, 2021, as part of the live album Blackpink 2021 'The Show' Live.

== Track listing ==
Digital download and streaming

- 1. "Solo" – 2:49

CD single

- 1. "Solo" – 2:50
- 2. "Solo" (instrumental) – 2:50

== Credits and personnel ==
Credits adapted from CD liner notes.

Recording

- Recorded at The Black Label Studio (Seoul)
- Mixed at The Lab (Los Angeles)
- Mastered at Sterling Sound (New York City)

Personnel

- Jennie – vocals
- Teddy – lyricist, composer
- 24 – composer, arranger
- Yongin Choi – recording engineer
- Jason Robert – mixing engineer
- Chris Gehringer – mastering

== Charts ==
=== Weekly charts ===
Weekly chart performance
Chart (2018–23)	Peak position
Canada Hot 100 (Billboard)	67
France Download (SNEP)	75
Hungary (Single Top 40)	31
Japan Hot 100 (Billboard)	22
Malaysia (RIM)	2
New Zealand Hot Singles (RMNZ)	13
Scottish Singles Sales (Official Charts)	80
Singapore (RIAS)	2
South Korea (Gaon)	1
South Korea (K-pop Hot 100)	1
South Korean Albums (Gaon)	2
UK Singles Downloads (Official Charts)	72
US World Digital Song Sales (Billboard)	1
Vietnam (Vietnam Hot 100)	85

=== Monthly charts ===
Monthly chart performance
Chart (2018)	Peak position
South Korea (Gaon)	3
South Korean Albums (Gaon)	16

=== Year-end charts ===
2018 year-end chart performance for "Solo"
Chart (2018)	Position
South Korea (Gaon)	86
South Korean Albums (Gaon)	100

2019 year-end chart performance for "Solo"
Chart (2019)	Position
South Korea (Gaon)	35
US World Digital Songs (Billboard)	11

== Certifications and sales ==
Certifications and sales
Region	Certification	Certified units/sales
Brazil (Pro-Música Brasil)	3× Platinum	120,000^{‡}
France (SNEP)	Gold	100,000^{‡}
New Zealand (RMNZ)	Gold	15,000^{‡}
South Korea (KMCA)	Platinum	2,500,000^{*}
South Korea (KMCA) Physical album	Platinum	250,000^{^}
Streaming
Japan (RIAJ)	Gold	50,000,000^{†}
South Korea (KMCA)	Platinum	100,000,000^{†}
^{*} Sales figures based on certification alone.^{^} Shipments figures based on certification alone.^{‡} Sales+streaming figures based on certification alone.^{†} Streaming-only figures based on certification alone.

== Release history ==
Release formats for "Solo"
Region	Date	Version	Format	Label	Ref.
Various	November 12, 2018	Original	Digital download; streaming	YG; Interscope	
Various	November 18, 2018	Original; instrumental	CD single	YG; Interscope	

== See also ==
- List of certified albums in South Korea
- List of certified songs in South Korea
- List of Gaon Digital Chart number ones of 2018
- List of Inkigayo Chart winners (2018)
- List of K-pop Hot 100 number ones
- List of K-pop songs on the Billboard charts
