= List of Gaon Digital Chart number ones of 2018 =

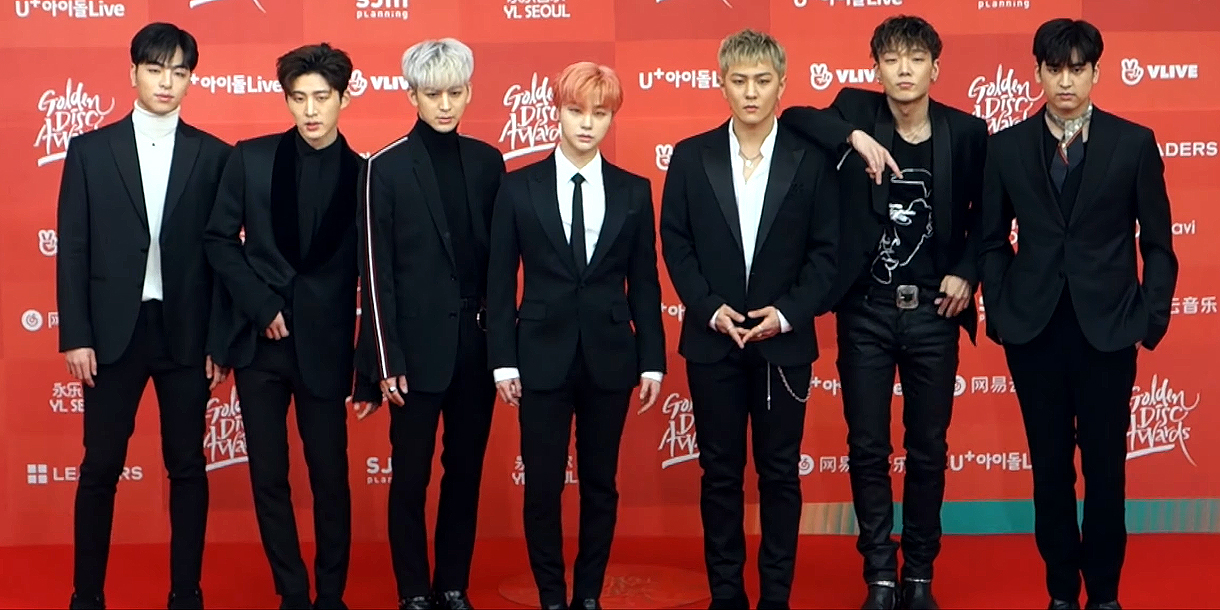
iKon's (pictured in 2018) "Love Scenario" topped the chart for six consecutive weeks, the longest ever, and was the best-performing song of the year.

The Gaon Digital Chart is a chart that ranks the best-performing singles in South Korea. Managed by the domestic Ministry of Culture, Sports and Tourism (MCST), its data is compiled by the Korea Music Content Industry Association and published by the Gaon Music Chart. The ranking is based collectively on each single's download sales, stream count, and background music use. In mid-2008, the Recording Industry Association of Korea ceased publishing music sales data. The MCST established a process to collect music sales in 2009, and began publishing its data with the introduction of the Gaon Music Chart the following February. With the creation of the Gaon Digital Chart, digital data for individual songs was provided in the country for the first time. Gaon provides weekly (listed from Sunday to Saturday), monthly and yearly charts. Below is a list of singles that topped the weekly and monthly charts.

== Weekly charts ==
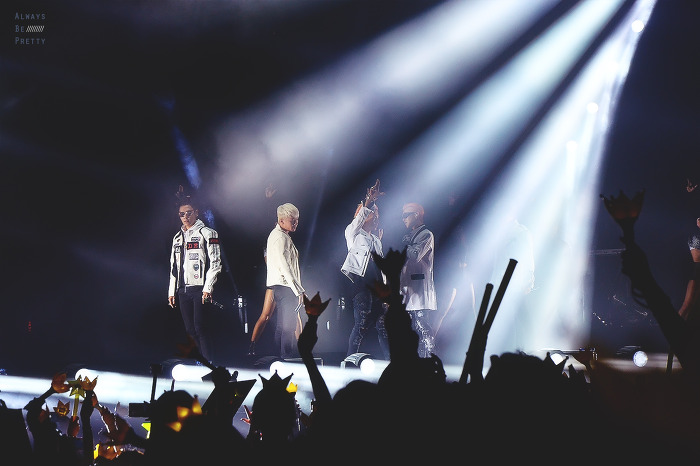
Big Bang's (pictured in 2015) "Flower Road" was the group's tenth single to top the chart and their last one as a five-member group.

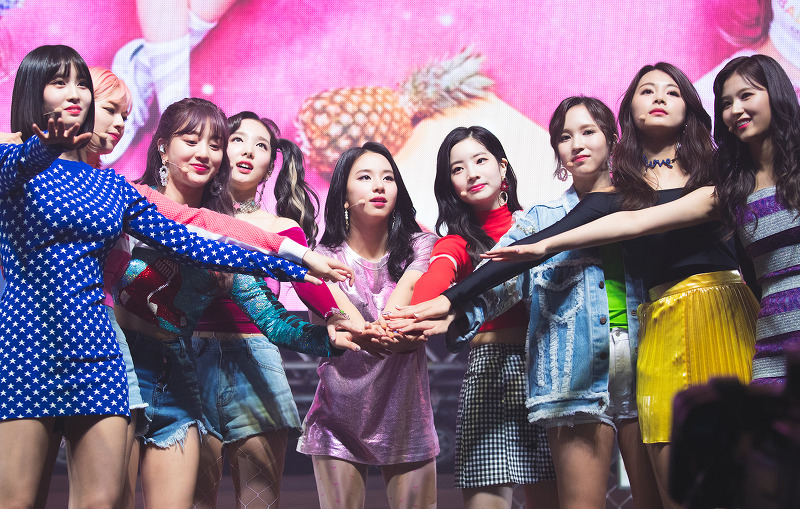
Twice (pictured in 2018) scored three number-one singles in 2018—"What Is Love", "Dance the Night Away" and "Yes or Yes".

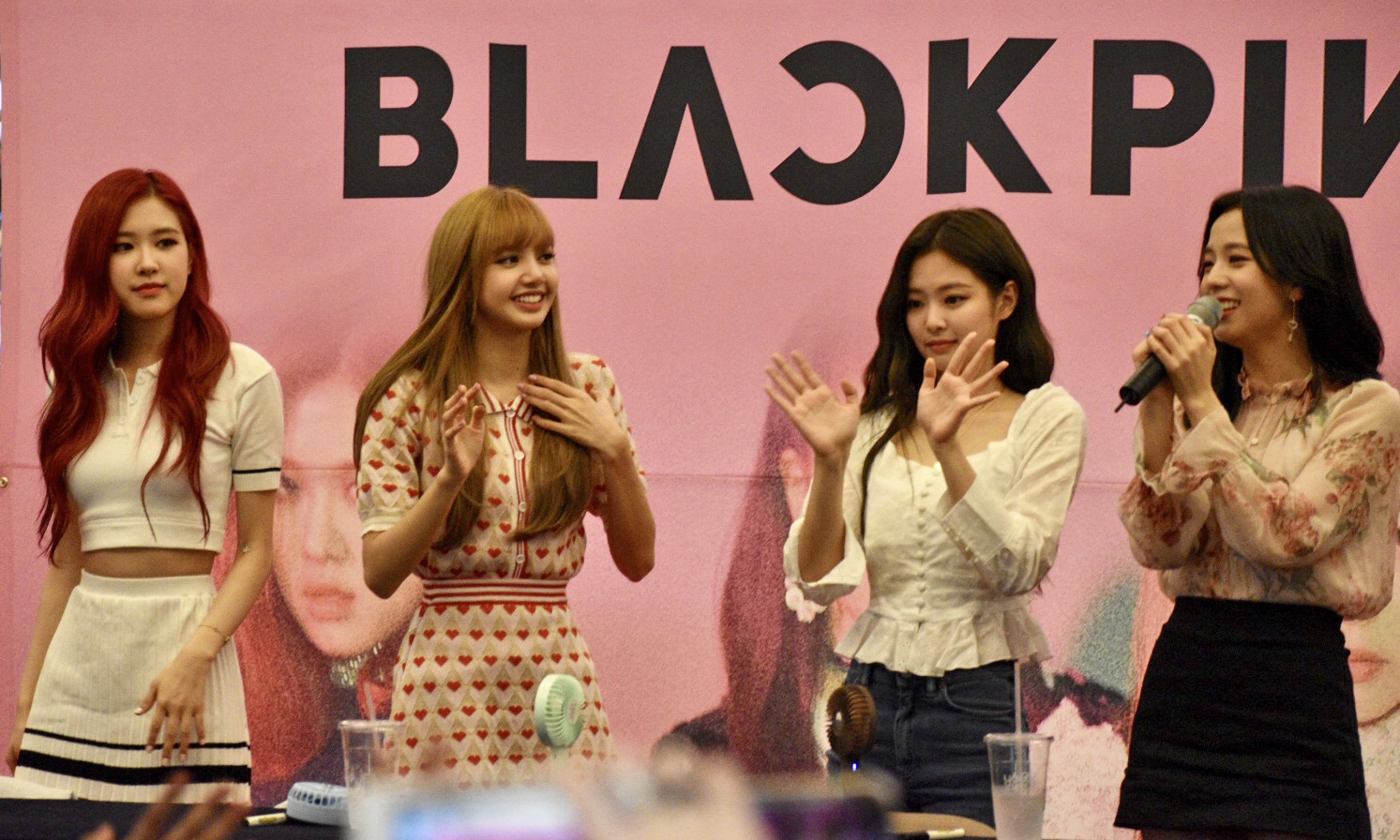
Blackpink's (pictured in 2018) "Ddu-Du Ddu-Du" was the best performing song of July and earned the highest weekly points in the chart's history. Member Jennie (third from left) also topped the chart with "Solo".

Key
†	Indicates best-performing single of 2018

Week ending date	Song	Artist(s)	Ref.
January 6	"Sound of Winter" (겨울소리)	Park Hyo-shin	
January 13	"Good Old Days" (그날처럼)	Jang Deok Cheol	
January 20	"Good Old Days" (그날처럼)	Jang Deok Cheol	
January 27	"Good Old Days" (그날처럼)	Jang Deok Cheol	
February 3	"Love Scenario" (사랑을 했다) †	iKON	
February 10	"Love Scenario" (사랑을 했다) †	iKON	
February 17	"Love Scenario" (사랑을 했다) †	iKON	
February 24	"Love Scenario" (사랑을 했다) †	iKON	
March 3	"Love Scenario" (사랑을 했다) †	iKON	
March 10	"Love Scenario" (사랑을 했다) †	iKON	
March 17	"Flower Road" (꽃 길)	Big Bang	
March 24	"Flower Road" (꽃 길)	Big Bang	
March 31	"Flower Road" (꽃 길)	Big Bang	
April 7	"Bar Code" (바코드)	Haon and Vinxen	
April 14	"What Is Love?"	Twice	
April 21	"Pass By"	Nilo	
April 28	"Don't Give It to Me" (주지마)	Loco and Hwasa	
May 5	"Don't Give It to Me" (주지마)	Loco and Hwasa	
May 12	"Don't Give It to Me" (주지마)	Loco and Hwasa	
May 19	"Don't Give It to Me" (주지마)	Loco and Hwasa	
May 26	"Fake Love"	BTS	
June 2	"Travel" (여행)	Bolbbalgan4	
June 9	"Travel" (여행)	Bolbbalgan4	
June 16	"Travel" (여행)	Bolbbalgan4	
June 23	"Ddu-Du Ddu-Du" (뚜두뚜두)	Blackpink	
June 30	"Ddu-Du Ddu-Du" (뚜두뚜두)	Blackpink	
July 7	"Ddu-Du Ddu-Du" (뚜두뚜두)	Blackpink	
July 14	"Dance the Night Away"	Twice	
July 21	"Way Back Home"	Shaun	
July 28	"Way Back Home"	Shaun	
August 4	"SoulMate"	Zico featuring IU	
August 11	"Power Up"	Red Velvet	
August 18	"Power Up"	Red Velvet	
August 25	"Way Back Home"	Shaun	
September 1	"Idol"	BTS	
September 8	"Siren" (사이렌)	Sunmi	
September 15	"Siren" (사이렌)	Sunmi	
September 22	"The Hardest Part" (우리 그만하자)	Roy Kim	
September 29	"There Has Never Been a Day I Haven't Loved You" (하루도 그대를 사랑하지 않은 적이 없었다)	Im Chang-jung	
October 6	"There Has Never Been a Day I Haven't Loved You" (하루도 그대를 사랑하지 않은 적이 없었다)	Im Chang-jung	
October 13	"Bbibbi" (삐삐)	IU	
October 20	"Bbibbi" (삐삐)	IU	
October 27	"Bbibbi" (삐삐)	IU	
November 3	"Me After You" (너를 만나)	Paul Kim	
November 10	"Yes or Yes"	Twice	
November 17	"Solo"	Jennie	
November 24	"Solo"	Jennie	
December 1	"Fiancé" (아낙네)	Mino	
December 8	"Fiancé" (아낙네)	Mino	
December 15	"180 Degrees" (180도)	Ben	
December 22	"180 Degrees" (180도)	Ben	
December 29	"180 Degrees" (180도)	Ben	

== Monthly charts ==
Month	Song	Artist(s)	Ref.
January	"Good Old Days" (그날처럼)	Jang Deok Cheol	
February	"Love Scenario" (사랑을 했다)	iKON	
March	"Starry Night" (별이 빛나는 밤)	Mamamoo	
April	"Pass By"	Nilo	
May	"Don't Give It to Me" (주지마)	Loco and Hwasa	
June	"Travel" (여행)	Bolbbalgan4	
July	"Ddu-Du Ddu-Du" (뚜두뚜두)	Blackpink	
August	"Way Back Home"	Shaun	
September	"Siren" (사이렌)	Sunmi	
October	"Bbibbi" (삐삐)	IU	
November	"Me After You" (너를 만나)	Paul Kim	
December	"Fiancé" (아낙네)	Mino	
