= Warning (EP) =

2018 EP by Sunmi

EP by Sunmi
- Released: September 4, 2018
- Recorded: 2017–2018
- Genre: K-pop
- Length: 19:59
- Language: Korean, English
- Label: Makeus Entertainment

Sunmi chronology
Full Moon (2014)	Warning (2018)	1/6 (2021)

Singles from Warning
- 1. "Gashina" Released: August 22, 2017; 2. "Heroine" Released: January 18, 2018; 3. "Siren" Released: September 4, 2018

Warning (stylized in all caps) is the second extended play by South Korean singer Sunmi. It was released on September 4, 2018, by Makeus Entertainment. It is her first solo Korean material since the release of Full Moon in February 2014. "Gashina" was released as the lead single.

== Background and release ==
On August 22, 2017, Sunmi released her third single "Gashina", which became her first release since the disbandment of Wonder Girls and the expiration of her contract with JYP Entertainment. The song was a commercial success and topped the Gaon Digital Chart, selling over 1,100,000 digital downloads as of December 2017. Her fourth single "Heroine" was released on January 18, 2018 and peaked at number 2 on Gaon Digital Chart. It was produced by The Black Label, marking her second collaboration with the YG-owned label after "Gashina".

On July 11, it was reported that Sunmi has officially began working on her new album. In response to the reports, her agency MAKEUS Entertainment confirmed that she is preparing for a comeback aimed for September. On August 20, Sunmi's agency revealed the first teaser for her new album Warning on Twitter along with the release date set for September 4. On August 26, the tracklist of Warning was released via official social media channels of Make Us Entertainment. "Siren" was released on September 4, along with the EP and music video. It topped the Gaon Digital Chart, becoming Sunmi's second number one on the chart. In support of the EP, Sunmi embarked on her first solo world tour visiting cities in North America, Asia and Europe.

== Track listing ==
No.	Title	Lyrics	Music	Arrangement	Length
1.	"Addict"	Sunmi	Sunmi, Frants	Frants	1:52
2.	"Siren" (사이렌; Sairen)	Sunmi	Sunmi, Frants	Frants	3:19
3.	"Curve" (곡선; Gogseon)	Sunmi	Kriz, Tomoka Ida	Tomoka Ida	3:37
4.	"Black Pearl"	Sunmi	Sunmi, Frants	Frants	3:19
5.	"Gashina" (가시나; Gashina)	Teddy, Sunmi, Joe Rhee, 24	Teddy, 24, Joe Rhee	24, Joe Rhee	3:00
6.	"Heroine" (주인공; Juingong)	Teddy, Sunmi	Teddy, 24	24	3:15
7.	"Secret Tape" (비밀테이프; Bimil Teipeu)	Sunmi	Sunmi, Frants	Sunmi, Frants	1:32
Total length:					19:59

== Accolades ==
Year-end lists
Critic/Publication	List	Work	Rank	Ref.
Billboard	The 20 Best K-Pop Albums of 2018: Critics' Picks	Warning	3	
Bravo	10 Best K-pop albums of the year	Warning	3	
MTV	The 18 Best K-pop B-sides Of 2018	Warning	8	

== Charts ==
=== Weekly charts ===
Chart (2018)	Peak position
South Korean Albums (Gaon)	9

=== Monthly charts ===
Chart (September 2018)	Peak position
South Korean Albums (Gaon)	19

== Sales ==
Chart	Sales
South Korea (Gaon)	10,455

== Release history ==
Country	Date	Format	Label
Various	September 4, 2018	CD; digital download; streaming	Makeus Entertainment
