= Bbibbi =

2018 single by IU

Single by IU
- Released: October 10, 2018
- Genre: Alt-R&B
- Length: 3:14
- Label: Kakao M
- Composer: Lee Jonghoon
- Lyricist: Lee Ji-eun
- Producer: Son Myung-gab

IU singles chronology
"Sleepless Rainy Night" (2017)	"Bbibbi" (2018)	"Love Poem" (2019)

Music video
- "Bbibbi" on YouTube

"Bbibbi" (삐삐; Bbibbi) is a song recorded by South Korean singer-songwriter IU, released digitally on October 10, 2018, through Kakao M. The self-written song was produced by Son Myung-gab. It subsequently debuted at number one on the Gaon Digital Chart. The song was released in part to commemorate 10 years since IU's debut.

== Background ==
On October 1, 2018, IU announced the single through promotional posters on various social media accounts. According to Kakao M, the song was created in part to commemorate ten years since IU debuted.

== Composition ==
"Bbibbi" is a laid-back alt-R&B track with confrontational and introspective lyrics that addresses IU's critics, with her turning around commentary on her image. Particular attention was paid to her delivery, including phrases and words like "yellow C-A-R-D" and "hello stu-P-I-D". "Bbibbi" refers to a pager in Korean, in particular the noise the device makes before people leave a message.

== Commercial performance ==
"Bbibbi" debuted atop the Gaon Digital Chart on the week ending October 13, making it her twentieth number one song in South Korea–the most for any artist.

== Music video ==
The music video, directed by VM Project, was released along with the song and makes prominent use of monochromatic colour schemes. IU performs a choreographed hip hop dance routine with a blank expression on her face, which was called "more cute than menacing" by Caitlin Kelley of Forbes. She also appears in high fashion looks, with Billboard stating that she wears a "Grace Kelly-style scarf".

The video currently has over 230 million views, making it the second most popular Korean music video by a female soloist in 2018.

== Accolades ==
Critic lists
Publication	List	Rank	Ref.
Billboard	100 Best Songs of 2018	87	
Billboard	The 20 Best K-pop Songs of 2018	4	
Paper	Top 20 K-Pop Songs of 2018	5	
SBS	Top 100 Asian pop songs of 2018	44	
Spotify	Best of 2018: K-Pop	18	

Music program awards (7 total)
Program	Date	Ref.
Music Bank	October 19, 2018	
Show! Music Core	October 20, 2018	
Show! Music Core	October 27, 2018	
Show! Music Core	November 3, 2018	
Inkigayo	October 21, 2018	
Inkigayo	October 28, 2018	
Inkigayo	November 4, 2018	

== Charts ==
Chart performance for "Bbibbi"
Chart (2018)	Peak position
New Zealand Hot Singles (RMNZ)	26
Singapore (RIAS)	26
South Korea (K-pop Hot 100)	1
South Korea (Gaon)	1
US World Digital Songs (Billboard)	5

== Certifications ==
Certifications for "Bbibbi"
Region	Certification	Certified units/sales
South Korea (KMCA)	Platinum	2,500,000^{*}
Streaming
South Korea (KMCA)	Platinum	100,000,000^{†}
^{*} Sales figures based on certification alone.^{†} Streaming-only figures based on certification alone.

== See also ==
- List of certified songs in South Korea
- List of Gaon Digital Chart number ones of 2018
- List of Inkigayo Chart winners (2018)
- List of K-pop Hot 100 number ones
