= Heroine (Sunmi song) =

Single by Sunmi

from the EP Warning
- Released: January 18, 2018
- Recorded: 2017
- Studio: The Black Label Studios
- Length: 3:15
- Label: Makeus; The Black Label; Loen
- Songwriters: Teddy; Sunmi
- Producers: Teddy; 24

Sunmi singles chronology
| "Gashina" (2017) | "Heroine" (2018) | "Siren" (2018) |

Music video
- "Heroine" on YouTube

"Heroine" (Korean: 주인공; RR: Juingong; lit. 'Protagonist') is a song recorded by South Korean singer Sunmi. It was released on January 18, 2018, by Makeus Entertainment and The Black Label and distributed by LOEN Entertainment, with its music video premiering the same day.

Following the success of her third solo release "Gashina", which articulated a cynical attitude in the aftermath of a breakup, Sunmi conceptualized "Heroine" as a prequel narrative to it. She drew inspiration from the Adrian Lyne film 9½ Weeks (1986), expressing a "show must go on" sentiment as the protagonist deals with a turbulent relationship.

== Background and release ==
On December 18, 2017, it was revealed that the singer was preparing for a comeback with the goal to release a new song in January 2018 with no further details. On January 2, an image teaser was released revealing the name as "Heroine" and the producer as The Black Label, marking her second collaboration with the YG-owned label after "Gashina". The release date was set to January 18 at 6 P.M. KST. A day after, a short clip was released titled as a "prequel" to the official music video. On January 3, a full schedule was released, revealing the dates for image and video teasers, starting on January 4.

The song was released on January 18, 2018, through several music portals, including MelOn in South Korea.

== Composition ==
The song was written by Sunmi and Teddy Park, and produced by Teddy alongside 24. Musically, the song is noted for its Britpop and tropical house influences.

== Music video ==
The first music video teaser was released on January 15, and shows the singer descending from a car to then show a close-up of her face. A second teaser titled "Scene #2" was released a day later, and shows the singer running and dancing at the same place as the first teaser. The official music video was released on January 18.

The music video was directed by the group Lumpens.

== Commercial performance ==
The song debuted at number 6 on the Gaon Digital Chart, on the chart issue dating January 14–20, 2018, topping the componing Download Chart. In its second week, the song reach a new peak at number 2.

The song also debuted at number 3 on the US World Digital Song Sales with 2,000 downloads sold.

== Controversy ==
There are concerns that the song has plagiarized Cheryl's debut solo single "Fight for This Love", which was released in 2009. Sunmi's agency said that they were investigating the issue. It later concluded with stating, "We unequivocally reveal that ‘Heroine’ is 100 percent an original creative work with absolutely no reference to the song that has been named in the controversy."

== Charts ==
=== Weekly charts ===
| Chart (2018) | Peak position |
|---|---|
| South Korea (Circle Digital Chart) | 2 |
| South Korea (K-pop Hot 100) | 2 |
| US World Digital Songs (Billboard) | 3 |

=== Year-end charts ===
| Chart (2018) | Position |
|---|---|
| South Korea (Circle) | 47 |

== Accolades ==
Year-end lists
| Critic/Publication | List | Rank | Ref. |
|---|---|---|---|
| Billboard | The 20 Best K-pop Songs of 2018: Critics' Picks | 10 | |
| PAPER | PAPER's Top 20 K-Pop Songs of 2018 | 3 | |
| The Young Folks | The 20 Best K-Pop Singles of 2018 | 1 | |

Decade-end lists
| Critic/Publication | List | Rank | Ref. |
|---|---|---|---|
| Billboard | The 100 Greatest K-Pop Songs of the 2010s | 28 | |

=== Awards and nominations ===
| Year | Award | Category | Result | Ref. |
|---|---|---|---|---|
| 2019 | 33rd Golden Disc Awards | Digital Daesang | Nominated | |
| 2019 | 8th Gaon Chart Music Awards | Song of the Year – January | Nominated | |

=== Music program awards ===
| Program | Date |
|---|---|
| M Countdown (Mnet) | January 25, 2018 |
| Music Core (MBC) | January 27, 2018 |
| Inkigayo (SBS) | January 28, 2018 |
| Inkigayo (SBS) | February 4, 2018 |

== See also ==
- List of M Countdown Chart winners (2018)
