= Gashina =

2017 single by Sunmi

Single by Sunmi

from the EP Warning
- Released: August 22, 2017
- Recorded: 2017
- Genre: Dancehall; synthpop
- Length: 3:00
- Label: Makeus Entertainment; The Black Label
- Songwriters: Teddy Park; Sunmi; Joe Rhee; 24

Sunmi singles chronology
"Full Moon" (2014)	"Gashina" (2017)	"Heroine" (2018)

Music video
- "Gashina" on YouTube

"Gashina" (Korean: 가시나; RR: Gasina) is a song recorded by South Korean singer Sunmi. It was released as a CD single and digital single by Makeus Entertainment and The Black Label on August 22, 2017, and distributed by LOEN Entertainment. "Gashina" is Sunmi's first release since the disbandment of Wonder Girls and the expiration of her contract with JYP Entertainment. It was released as the lead single from her second Korean-language EP Warning.

== Composition ==
Written by Teddy Park, Sunmi, Joe Rhee, and 24, the song was described as a "dancehall-style synth-pop number that rocks an Eastern-style atmosphere and a distinct rhythmic bass sound". It was co-produced by The Black Label, a subsidiary of YG Entertainment.

== Commercial performance ==
The physical copy of "Gashina", titled Sunmi Special Edition Gashina, entered at number 16 on the Gaon Album Chart, on the chart issue dated August 20–26, 2017. The physical CD sold 2,954 copies and placed at number 56 for the month of August.

The song debuted at number 2 on the Gaon Digital Chart, on the chart issue dated August 20–26, 2017, with 174,383 downloads sold – topping the Download Chart – and 4,670,275 streams. In its second week, the song peaked atop the chart, with 151,199 downloads sold – staying atop the Download Chart – and 7,201,441 streams. The song placed at number 15 for the month of August and peaked at number 3 the following month. It has sold over 667,590 digital downloads as of September 2017.

The song also debuted at number 3 on the US World Digital Song Sales with 1,000 downloads sold in the week ending September 9, 2017.

The song was the 32nd best-selling song of 2017 in South Korea with 1,190,380 downloads sold.

== Charts ==
=== Weekly charts ===
Weekly chart performance for "Gashina"
Chart (2017)	Peak position
South Korea (Gaon Digital Chart)	1
South Korea (Gaon Album Chart)	16
US World Digital Songs (Billboard)	3
South Korea (K-pop Hot 100)	24

=== Year-end charts ===
2017 year-end chart performance for "Gashina"
Chart (2017)	Position
South Korea (Gaon)	32

2018 year-end chart performance for "Gashina"
Chart (2018)	Position
South Korea (Gaon)	99

== Accolades ==
=== All-time and year-end lists ===
Critic/Publication	List	Rank	Ref.
Melon	Top 100 K-pop Songs of All Time	28	
Billboard	The Best K-pop Songs of 2017: Critics' Picks	3	
Dazed Digital	20 Best K-Pop Songs of 2017	9	

=== Awards and nominations ===
Year	Award	Category	Result
2017	19th Mnet Asian Music Awards	Best Dance Performance – Solo	Nominated
2017	9th Melon Music Awards	Best Dance – Female	Nominated
2018	32nd Golden Disc Awards	Digital Bonsang	Nominated
2018	7th Gaon Chart Music Awards	Song of the Year – August	Won
2018	15th Korean Music Awards	Best Pop Song	Nominated
2018	27th Seoul Music Awards	Bonsang Award	Nominated

Music program awards for "Gashina"
Program	Date
Inkigayo	September 3, 2017
Inkigayo	September 10, 2017
Inkigayo	September 24, 2017
Show Champion	September 6, 2017
M Countdown	September 7, 2017
