= Sunmi discography =

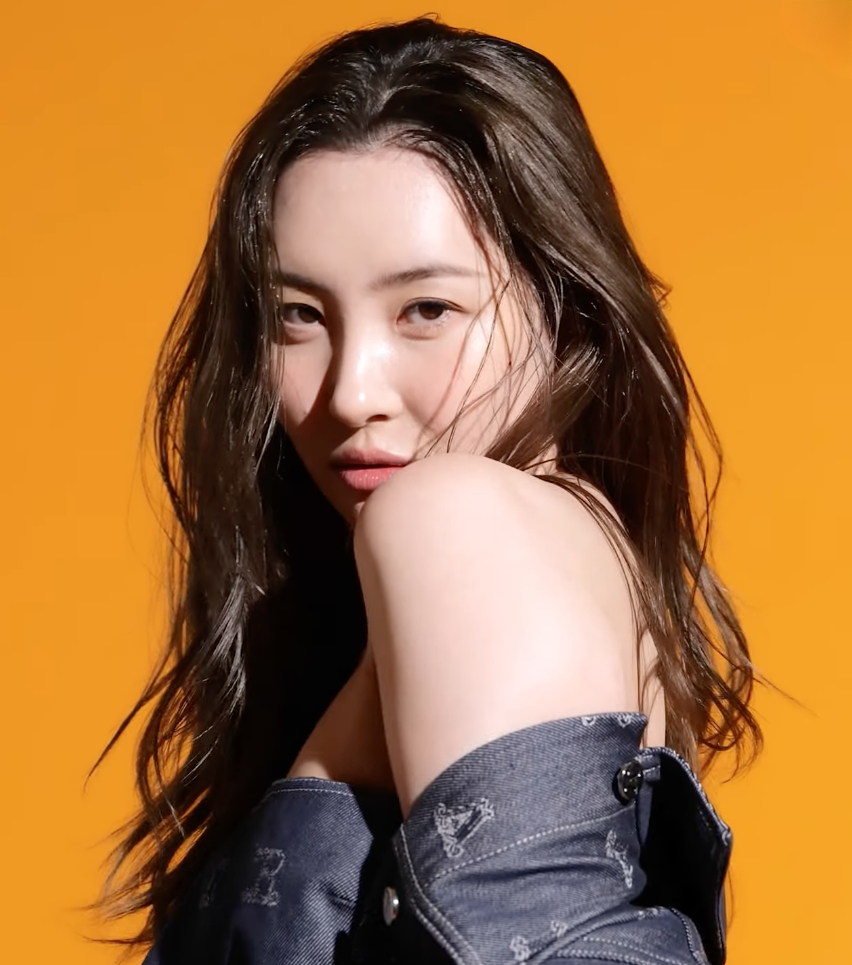
- Sunmi in 2022
- Studio albums: 1
- EPs: 3
- Singles: 16
- Single albums: 1
- Soundtrack appearances: 2

The discography of Sunmi, a South Korean singer-songwriter, consists of one studio album, three extended plays, one single album and 16 singles as a lead artist. She made her solo debut with "24 Hours" in August 2013. At the time, she was still a member of the girl group Wonder Girls under JYP Entertainment. The song peaked at number two on the Gaon Digital Chart. The following year, she released "Full Moon", which also peaked at number two. Both songs were included in the EP Full Moon (2014).

After the Wonder Girls disbanded in 2017, Sunmi signed with Makeus Entertainment and released her single "Gashina", produced by Teddy Park of The Black Label. The song debuted at number two on the Gaon Digital Chart before topping the chart the following week. It was her first number-one single in South Korea and garnered over 2,500,000 digital downloads in the country. The following year, she released "Heroine", which peaked at number two, and "Siren", which became her second (and last, up to date) number-one single. Both songs were part of a trilogy included in her EP Warning (2008).

From 2019 to 2021, Sunmi released the stand-alone singles "Noir", "Lalalay", "Pporappippam", and "Tail"; the first three of them peaked inside the top 10 of the Digital Chart. During that time, she also collaborated with J.Y. Park, former CEO of JYP Entertainment, on the track "When We Disco", from his compilation album J.Y. Park Best. The duet was a top 3 hit in South Korea. On August 6, 2021, she released the EP 1/6 alongside the single "You Can't Sit With Us", which was a moderate hit in South Korea. In spite of this, the EP remains her best-selling album.

In 2022, Sunmi released the song "Heart Burn", which nearly missed the top 20 and was a summer hit in South Korea. In 2023, she released the experimental pop song "Stranger", which peaked at number 100 on the Circle Chart. The following year, she released "Balloon in Love", which peaked at 89 and was a moderate summer hit in her country. In 2025, after more than 12 years of her solo debut and more than 18 years of her music industry debut with the Wonder Girls, Sunmi finally released her highly anticipated first solo album, Heart Maid, which featured the singles "Blue!" and "Cynical" alongside the previously released single "Balloon in Love".

== Studio albums ==
Title	Details	Peak chart positions	Sales
Title	Details	KOR	Sales
Heart Maid	Released: November 5, 2025; Label: Abyss Company; Formats: CD, digital download	30	KOR: 8,998

== Extended plays ==
List of extended plays, with selected chart positions and sales
Title	Details	Peak chart positions		Sales
Title	Details	KOR	US World	Sales
Full Moon	Released: February 17, 2014; Label: JYP Entertainment; Formats: CD, digital download	12	12	KOR: 5,665
Warning	Released: September 4, 2018; Label: Makeus Entertainment; Formats: CD, digital download	9	—	KOR: 10,455
1/6	Released: August 6, 2021; Label: Abyss Company; Formats: CD, digital download	5	—	KOR: 24,420
"—" denotes album did not chart.

== Single albums ==
List of single albums, with selected chart positions and sales
Title	Details	Peak chart positions	Sales
Title	Details	KOR	Sales
Gashina	Released: August 22, 2017; Labels: Makeus Entertainment, The Black Label; Formats: CD, digital download	16	KOR: 2,954

== Singles ==
List of singles, with selected chart positions, showing year released and album name
Title	Year	Peak chart positions								Sales	Album
Title	Year	KOR	KOR Billb.	CIS Air.	FIN Dig.	KAZ Air.	RUS Air.	SGP	US World	Sales	Album
"24 Hours" (24시간이 모자라)	2013	2	3	—	—	*	—	—	—	KOR: 763,750	Full Moon
"Full Moon" (보름달) (featuring Lena)	2014	2	3	—	—	*	—	—	13	KOR: 894,993	Full Moon
"Gashina" (가시나)	2017	1	24	—	—	*	—	—	3	KOR: 2,500,000; US: 1,000	Warning
"Heroine" (주인공)	2018	2	2	—	—	*	—	—	3	US: 2,000	Warning
"Siren" (사이렌)	2018	1	1	—	—	*	—	25	5	—N/a	Warning
"Noir" (누아르)	2019	8	9	—	—	*	—	— (Note: "Noir" did not enter the RIAS Top 30 International Streaming Chart, but it peaked at number 22 on the component RIAS Top 30 Regional Streaming Chart.)	3	—N/a	Non-album singles
"Lalalay" (날라리)	2019	8	1	—	9	*	—	22	4	US: 1,000	Non-album singles
"Pporappippam" (보라빛 밤)	2020	5	4	—	—	*	—	15	5	—N/a	Non-album singles
"Tail" (꼬리)	2021	22	14	—	—	*	—	— (Note: "Tail" did not enter the RIAS Top Streaming Chart, but it peaked at number 19 on the component RIAS Top Regional Chart.)	13	—N/a	Non-album singles
"You Can't Sit with Us"	2021	46	38	—	—	*	—	— (Note: "You Can't Sit With Us" did not enter the RIAS Top Streaming Chart, but it peaked at number 17 on the component RIAS Top Regional Chart.)	10	—N/a	1/6
"Go or Stop?"	2021	— (Note: "Go or Stop?" did not enter the Gaon Digital Chart, but it peaked at number 23 on the component Gaon Download Chart.)	—	—	—	*	—	—	—	—N/a	Non-album singles
"Oh Sorry Ya" (Note: "Oh Sorry Ya" was released exclusively on Spotify.)	2022	—	—	—	—	*	—	—	—	—N/a	Non-album singles
"Heart Burn" (열이올라요)	2022	23	15	—	—	*	—	—	14	—N/a	Non-album singles
"Stranger"	2023	100	—	—	—	—	—	—	—	—N/a	Non-album singles
"Balloon in Love"	2024	89	—	—	—	—	—	—	—	—N/a	Heart Maid
"Blue!"	2025	— (Note: "Blue!" did not enter the Circle Digital Chart, but it peaked at number 26 on the component Circle Download Chart.)	—	—	—	—	—	—	—	—N/a	Heart Maid
"Cynical"	2025	— (Note: "Cynical" did not enter the Circle Digital Chart, but it peaked at number 14 on the component Circle Download Chart.)	—	48	—	24	34	—	—	—N/a	Heart Maid
"Forever July"	2026	—	—	—	—	—	—	—	—	—N/a	Non-album single
"—" denotes a recording that did not chart or was not released in that territory. "*" denotes that the chart did not exist at that time.

=== Collaborations ===
Title	Year	Peak chart positions			Certifications	Album
Title	Year	KOR	KOR Billb.	US World	Certifications	Album
"When We Disco" (with J. Y. Park)	2020	3	2	22	KMCA: Platinum (st.)	J.Y. Park Best
"Too Young to Die" (with Hook)	2021	— (Note: "Too Young to Die" did not enter the Gaon Digital Chart, but it peaked at number 69 on the component Gaon Download Chart.)	—	—		Street Woman Fighter Special
"Lights Out" (불이 꺼지고) (with Be'O)	2023	160	—	—		Billion Music Project Vol. 1
"—" denotes a recording that did not chart or was not released in that territory.

== Soundtrack appearances ==
Title	Year	Peak chart positions			Album
Title	Year	KOR	KOR Billb.	US World	Album
"Gotta Go" (가라고)	2020	123	65	17	XX OST Part 1
"Crossroad"	2024	— (Note: "Crossroad" did not enter the Circle Digital Chart, but it peaked at number 43 on the component Circle Download Chart.)	—	—	The Judge from Hell OST
"—" denotes a recording that did not chart or was not released in that territory.

== Other charted songs ==
Title	Year	Peak chart positions			Album
Title	Year	KOR	KOR Down.	US World	Album
"Frozen in Time" (멈춰버린 시간) (featuring Jackson)	2014	100	83	—	Full Moon
"Who Am I" (내가 누구) (featuring Yubin)	2014	112	91	—	Full Moon
"If That Was You" (그게 너라면)	2014	118	103	—	Full Moon
"burn"	2014	159	137	—	Full Moon
"You" (B1A4 featuring Sunmi)	2014	63	64	—	Solo Day
"What the Flower" (꽃같네)	2021	—	40	18	"Tail"
"1/6" (6분의1)	2021	—	81	—	1/6
"Sunny"	2021	—	100	—	1/6
"Call"	2021	—	113	—	1/6
"Narcissism"	2021	—	122	—	1/6
"Borderline"	2021	—	132	—	1/6
"Childhood" (풋사랑)	2022	—	62	—	Heart Burn
"Call My Name" (덕질)	2023	—	51	—	Stranger
"Calm Myself"	2023	—	68	—	Stranger
"—" denotes a recording that did not chart or was not released in that territory.

== Composition credits ==
All the credits are sourced from Korea Music Copyright Association unless otherwise stated.

Year	Album	Artist	Song	Lyrics		Composer	
Year	Album	Artist	Song	Credited	With	Credited	With
2015	Reboot	Wonder Girls	"Rewind"	Yes	Ju Hyo, Lee Toyo and Yubin	Yes	Ju Hyo and Lee Toyo
2015	Reboot	Wonder Girls	"Faded Love"	Yes	Shim Eun-ji	Yes	Shim Eun-ji
2016	Why So Lonely	Wonder Girls	"Why So Lonely"	Yes	Hyerim, Yubin and Hong Ji-sang	Yes	Hyerim, Yubin and Hong Ji-sang
2016	Why So Lonely	Wonder Girls	"To The Beautiful You"	Yes	Yubin, Hyerim and Frants	Yes	Yubin, Hyerim and Frants
2017	Warning	Sunmi	"Gashina"	Yes	Teddy, 24 and Joe Rhee	No	Teddy, 24 and Joe Rhee
2018	Warning	Sunmi	"Heroine"	Yes	Teddy	No	Teddy and 24
2018	Warning	Sunmi	"Siren"	Yes	—	Yes	Frants
2018	Warning	Sunmi	"Addict"	Yes	—	Yes	Frants
2018	Warning	Sunmi	"Curve"	Yes	—	No	Kriz and Tomoko Ida
2018	Warning	Sunmi	"Black Pearl"	Yes	—	Yes	Frants
2018	Warning	Sunmi	"Secret Tape"	Yes	—	Yes	Frants
2019	Non-album singles	Sunmi	"Noir"	Yes	—	Yes	El Capitxn
2019	Non-album singles	Sunmi	"Lalalay"	Yes	—	Yes	Frants
2020	XX OST Part 1	Sunmi	"Gotta Go"	Yes	—	Yes	Frants
2020	Non-album single	Sunmi	"Pporappippam"	Yes	—	Yes	Frants
2021	Tail	Sunmi	"Tail"	Yes	—	Yes	Frants
2021	Tail	Sunmi	"What The Flower"	Yes	—	Yes	Hong So-jin
2021	1/6	Sunmi	"You Can't Sit with Us"	Yes	—	No	Melanie Fontana, Michel Schulz, Ross Golan
2021	1/6	Sunmi	"Sunny"	Yes	—	No	Jake K, Maria Marcus, MCK
2021	1/6	Sunmi	"1/6"	Yes	—	Yes	Frants
2021	1/6	Sunmi	"Call"	Yes	—	Yes	Frants, El Capitxn
2021	1/6	Sunmi	"Narcissism"	Yes	—	Yes	Frants
2021	1/6	Sunmi	"Borderline"	Yes	—	Yes	Frants
2021	Non-album single	Sunmi	"Go or Stop?"	Yes	—	Yes	Frants
2021	Street Woman Fighter(SWF)Special	HOOK x Sunmi	"Too young to die(Prod. FRANTS)"	Yes	—	Yes	Frants
2022	Non-album single	Sunmi	"Oh Sorry Ya" (Note: credits for this song were taken from genius)	Yes	—	Yes	Gisselle Acevedo, Alina Smith & LYRE
2022	Sunmiya Club OST Part.1	Sunmi	"Fellowship"	Yes	—	Yes	Eydren
