= Gotta Go =

Gotta Go may refer to:

- "Gotta Go" (Trey Songz song), 2005
- "Gotta Go" (Sunmi song), 2020
- "Gotta Go" (Chungha song), 2019
- "Gotta Go", a song by Jenny Berggren from the 2010 album My Story
- "Gotta Go", a song by Lynyrd Skynyrd from the 1982 album Best of the Rest
- "Gotta Go (Can't Wage a War)", a song by Kingdom Come from the 1989 album In Your Face
- "Gotta Go", a 2022 song by Collar

== See also ==
- "Gotta Go My Own Way", a song on the High School Musical 2 soundtrack
- "If You Gotta Go, Go Now", a 1964 song by Bob Dylan
