= Choi Jung-woo (actor, born 1995) =

South Korean actor (born 1995)

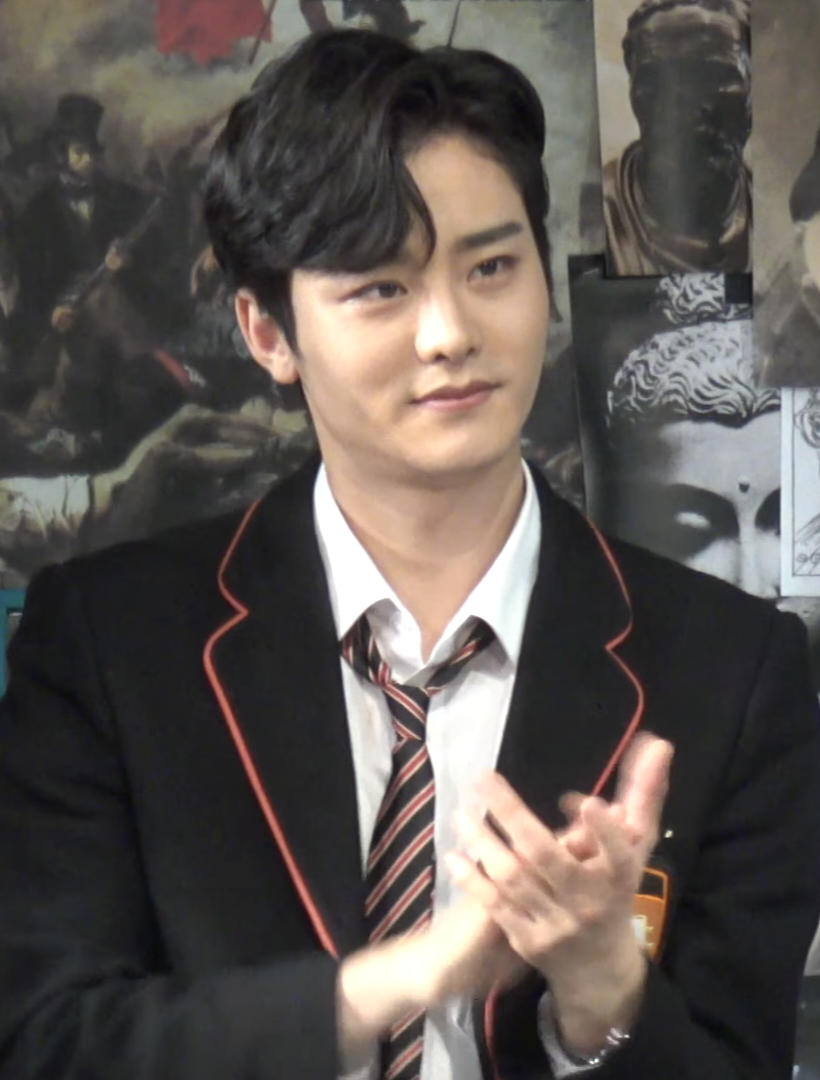
- Choi in October 2020
- Born: 29 March 1995 (age 31); Seoul, South Korea
- Other name: Choi Jeong-woo
- Education: Korea National University of Arts
- Occupation: Actor
- Years active: 2017–present
- Agent: SWMP

Choi Jung-woo (born 29 March 1995) is a South Korean actor.

== Early life and education ==
He was born on March 29, 1995, in Seoul. After sometime his parents moved to Jeju Island when he was five years old. When turned 11 his parents moved to Russia in Moscow, he attended school there and learned to speak Russian and English. There he went to British International School, he studied art. After sometime he decided to learn acting.

== Career ==
He made his acting debut in 2017 in stage play Twenty. The same year he appeared in drama You Are Too Much. In 2018 he appeared in Love Alert. The next year he appeared in drama I Started Following Romance. The following year he appeared in several dramas Big Picture House, Kingmaker: The Change of Destiny, XX and Cheat on Me If You Can. He also appeared in movie Trace.

== Filmography ==
=== Television series ===
Year	Title	Role	Ref.
2017	You Are Too Much	Jeong-woo	
2018	Love Alert	Choi Kyung-jung	
2020	Big Picture House	Ha Jae-jin	
2020	Kingmaker: The Change of Destiny	Chae In-kyu	
2020	Cheat on Me If You Can	Go Mi-rae's friend	
2021	At a Distance, Spring Is Green	Hong Chan-ki	
2022	Jinxed at First	Seon Dong-shik	
2023	Numbers	Yang Jae-hwan	

=== Web series ===
Year	Title	Role	Ref.
2019	I Started Following Romance	Jeon Seong-jae	
2020	XX	Jayden's ex	
2024	Flex X Cop	Bo-ri	

=== Film ===
Year	Title	Role	Ref.
2020	Trace	Kang-jae	

== Ambassadorship ==
- Public Relations Ambassador for the Korea Art Fair (2024).
