= Love Alert =

2018 South Korean television series

- Promotional poster
- Hangul: 설렘주의보
- Hanja: 설렘注意報
- Lit.: Fluttering Warning
- RR: Seollem juuibo
- MR: Sŏllem chuŭibo
- Genre: Romantic comedy
- Based on: Love Alert by Seo Han-kyul
- Written by: Kim Shin-hye
- Directed by: Jo Chang-wan
- Starring: Yoon Eun-hye; Chun Jung-myung
- Country of origin: South Korea
- Original language: Korean
- No. of episodes: 16

Production
- Camera setup: Single-camera
- Running time: 60 minutes
- Production company: Love Alert LLC (Note: Joint venture of YG Studioplex, The Groove Company, and Excel Investment Co., Ltd.)

Original release
- Network: MBN
- Release: October 31 – December 20, 2018

Love Alert (Korean: 설렘주의보) is a 2018 South Korean television series based on the web novel of the same name by Seo Han-kyul. It stars Yoon Eun-hye and Chun Jung-myung. It aired on MBN's Wednesdays and Thursdays at 23:00 KST from October 31 to December 20, 2018.

== Synopsis ==
The series is about a celibate doctor named Cha Woo-hyun (Chun Jung-myung) who gets involved in a scandal with top actress Yoon Yoo-jung (Yoon Eun-hye) for inexplicable reasons. The two sign a contract where they have to pretend to be in love to achieve their mutual goals.

== Cast ==
=== Main ===
- Yoon Eun-hye as Yoon Yoo-jung
- Chun Jung-myung as Cha Woo-hyun
- Han Go-eun as Han Chae-kyung
- Joo Woo-jae as Sung Hoon

=== Supporting ===
- Pyo Ji-hoon as Yoon Yoo-joon
- Lee Hye-ran as Joo Min-ah
- Kang Seo-yeon as Kang Hye-joo
- Kim Byung-ki as Cha Tae-soo
- Oh Mi-hee as Ko Kyung-eun
- Choi Cheol-ho as An Jung-seok
- Kim Ye-ryeong as Na Hwa-jung
- Choi Jung-won as Hwang Jae-min
- Choi Jung-woo as Choi Kyung-jung
- Jeong Gyu-su as Yoon Cheol-seo

== Original soundtrack ==
Love Alert OST

Soundtrack album by Various Artists
- Released: 2018
- Genre: K-pop
- Languages: Korean; English
- Labels: The Groove Company; Kakao M

=== Part 1 ===
Released on November 1, 2018
| No. | Title | Artists | Length |
|---|---|---|---|
| 1. | "Could I Love Again" (다시 만날 수 있을까) | Kim Jong-min | 3:42 |
| 2. | "Could I love again (Inst.)" (다시 만날 수 있을까) | | 3:42 |

=== Part 2 ===
Released on November 8, 2018
| No. | Title | Artists | Length |
|---|---|---|---|
| 1. | "I'll Come To You" (너에게 다가갈 거야) | Go Woon(Berry Good) | 3:06 |
| 2. | "I'll Come To You (Inst.)" (너에게 다가갈 거야) | | 3:06 |

=== Part 3 ===
Released on November 14, 2018
| No. | Title | Artists | Length |
|---|---|---|---|
| 1. | "Twice Love" (두번째 설레임) | Sangil (Snuper), Myung Hyung-seo (Busters) | 3:17 |
| 2. | "Twice Love (Inst.)" (두번째 설레임) | | 3:17 |

=== Part 4 ===
Released on November 22, 2018
| No. | Title | Artists | Length |
|---|---|---|---|
| 1. | "Beautiful as Ever" (여전히 아름다운) | Yoon Hyuk (December) | 3:56 |
| 2. | "Beautiful as Ever (Inst.)" (여전히 아름다운) | | 3:56 |

=== Part 5 ===
Released on December 6, 2018
| No. | Title | Artists | Length |
|---|---|---|---|
| 1. | "Because of You" (그대가 좋아서) | Eun Hee | 3:22 |
| 2. | "Because of You (Inst.)" (그대가 좋아서) | | 3:22 |

=== Part 6 ===
Released on December 12, 2018
| No. | Title | Artists | Length |
|---|---|---|---|
| 1. | "Away from You" (뒷걸음치며) | Jun Sang Geun | 4:21 |
| 2. | "Away from You (Inst.)" (뒷걸음치며) | | 4:21 |

=== Part 7 ===
Released on December 19, 2018
| No. | Title | Artists | Length |
|---|---|---|---|
| 1. | "I Want to Know" | Lee Gyu-ra | 3:40 |
| 2. | "I Want to Know (Inst.)" | | 3:40 |

== Ratings ==
In this table, the blue numbers represent the lowest ratings and the red numbers represent the highest ratings recorded by the series.

| Ep. | Original broadcast date | AGB Nielsen (Nationwide) |
|---|---|---|
| 1 | October 31, 2018 | 2.796% |
| 2 | November 1, 2018 | 1.763% |
| 3 | November 7, 2018 | 2.018% |
| 4 | November 8, 2018 | 2.382% |
| 5 | November 14, 2018 | 1.888% |
| 6 | November 15, 2018 | 1.824% |
| 7 | November 21, 2018 | 1.492% |
| 8 | November 22, 2018 | 1.602% |
| 9 | November 28, 2018 | 1.678% |
| 10 | November 29, 2018 | 1.421% |
| 11 | December 5, 2018 | 1.489% |
| 12 | December 6, 2018 | 1.544% |
| 13 | December 12, 2018 | 1.929% |
| 14 | December 13, 2018 | 1.623% |
| 15 | December 19, 2018 | 1.712% |
| 16 | December 20, 2018 | 1.604% |
| Average | | 1.797% |

- This drama airs on a cable channel/pay TV which normally has a relatively smaller audience compared to free-to-air TV/public broadcasters (KBS, SBS, MBC and EBS).

== Production ==
In January 2019, YG Studioplex, the drama production affiliate of YG Plus, belatedly announced that it has terminated its co-CEO Cho Jung-ho and filed a case against him. According to the company, ex-CEO Cho made an illegal contract to sell the distribution rights of Love Alert in Japan to an unnamed Japanese distribution company through his own firm Barami Bunda Inc., which was a co-owner in YG Studioplex. Cho also stole much money from investors, one of those was the drama's co-producer The Groove Company.
