= Heart Burn (song) =

2022 single by Sunmi

Single by Sunmi
- B-side: "Childhood"
- Released: June 29, 2022
- Genre: Dance; pop rock
- Length: 3:13
- Label: Abyss
- Composers: CobiCudi; Kyuwon 'Q' Kim; Ash
- Lyricists: Lee Sun-mi; CobiCudi; Kyuwon 'Q' Kim

Sunmi singles chronology
"Oh Sorry Ya" (2022)	"Heart Burn" (2022)	"Lights Out" (2023)

Music video
- "Heart Burn" on YouTube

Professional ratings
Review scores
Source	Rating
IZM	3.5/5 stars

"Heart Burn" (Korean: 열이올라요; RR: Yeoriollayo) is a song by South Korean singer and songwriter Sunmi. It was released as a standalone single on June 29, 2022, through Abyss Company. The song also goes with the B-side track "Childhood". Upon its release, the song peaked at number 23 on the Circle Digital Chart.

== Background and release ==
On June 8, 2022, Sunmi's agency Abyss Company stated that Sunmi was preparing for the comeback in the end of the month with the song titled "Heart Burn". Concept photos for the song were published on June 20 and June 21, 2022. The teaser for the track was released on June 16, as well as a music video teaser uploaded on YouTube on June 27.

The single was released digitally on June 29, 2022, along with a music video on Sunmi's official YouTube channel at 6:00 PM (KST). "Heart Burn" is Sunmi's second song after "Oh Sorry Ya" that streamed through EQUAL X Spotify Singles, a project that aims to uplift female artists during International Women's Day. On July 4, a band version of the song, in which Sunmi performed bass, was published as a special video.

By the time "Heart Burn" was promoted, Sunmi announced a worldwide tour named Good Girl Gone Mad that started in Warsaw from August 14, 2022.

== Composition ==
"Heart Burn" was composed and arranged by CobiCudi and Kyuwon 'Q' Kim. Sunmi participated in writing lyric for both the title track and the B-side track "Childhood". While having credit in music part for her B-side, Sunmi did not do it for the title song. In a press conference, she explained that she wanted to see how other producers perceived her by composing this track.

Sunmi considered her latest work to be the daytime version of her previous single "Pporappippam". "Heart Burn" is described as a catchy dance and pop rock song, with an addictive melody that gives a "mysterious yet energetic vibe". The B-side "Childhood" is also a city-pop-inspired song from the 2004 movie The Notebook and has the same vibe as her other tracks like "Black Pearl", "Faded Love".

== Music video ==
A scene in the "Heart Burn" music video, in which she dyed her hair orange and performed under large purple flower fan.

The music video for "Heart Burn" was filmed at Los Angeles. To show the atmosphere of the music video, Sunmi dyed her hair orange and added some freckles on her cheeks via makeup. The choreography, makeup, and costumes of the song were simplified as much as possible, as to make the MV purer. The point choreography was inspired by the hula dance form. Large fans were also served as a highlight of the music video.

The video's setting spans various locations and times, including 1966 Los Angeles, 1856 Texas, 1928 Bogota, and 1969 Tokyo. Sunmi plays the role of an immortal vampire who leaves a trail of dead lovers wherever she goes. By kissing her, all the men fell sick right after and died. At the end of the music video, she jumps, dances, and throws flower petals over the graves of the lovers she killed.

== Accolades ==
Critics' rankings of "Heart Burn"
Publication	Accolade	Rank	Ref.
NME	The 50 Best Songs of 2022	43	
NME	The 25 Best K-pop Songs of 2022	13	

Awards and nominations for "Heart Burn"
Ceremony	Year	Award	Result	Ref.
MAMA Awards	2022	Best Dance Performance – Solo	Nominated	

== Track listing ==
"Heart Burn" track listing
No.	Title	Lyrics	Music	Arrangement	Length
1.	"Heart Burn" (열이올라요)	Lee Sun-mi; CobiCudi; Kyuwon 'Q' Kim	Kim; CobiCudi	Kim	3:13
2.	"Childhood" (풋사랑)	Lee	Lee; Ash	Ash	3:15
Total length:					6:28

== Charts ==
=== Weekly charts ===
Weekly chart performance for "Heart Burn"
Chart (2022)	Peak position
South Korea (Circle)	23
US World Digital Song Sales (Billboard)	14

=== Monthly chart ===
Monthly chart performance for "Heart Burn"
Chart (2022)	Position
South Korea (Circle)	30

=== Year-end chart ===
Year-end chart performance for "Heart Burn"
Chart (2022)	Position
South Korea (Circle)	126

== Release history ==
Release dates and formats for "Heart Burn"
Region	Date	Format	Label	Ref.
Various	June 29, 2022	Digital download; streaming	Abyss	
