= 2020 Mnet Asian Music Awards =

22nd edition of the MAMA Awards held in 2020

- Date: December 6, 2020
- Location: CJ ENM Contents World, Paju, South Korea
- Hosted by: Song Joong-ki
- Most awards: BTS (9)
- Website: 2020 Mnet Asian Music Awards

Television/radio coverage
- Network: Mnet, across CJ E&M channels and other international networks, YouTube
- Runtime: 380 minutes (Main Ceremony)

The 2020 Mnet Asian Music Awards ceremony, organized by CJ E&M through its music channel Mnet, took place live on December 6 at the CJ ENM Contents World in Paju, South Korea with the theme, "New-Topia". The ceremony was the 22nd in the show's history but was held with no on-site audience due to the COVID-19 pandemic.

== Background ==
On September 11, CJ ENM responded to reports and confirmed that the year's MAMA will still take place despite the ongoing COVID-19 Pandemic, but no additional details were announced.

On September 21, it was reported that it will take place on December 6 with no location confirmed. The ongoing COVID-19 pandemic made it impossible to hold the event in Hong Kong. It was the first time in 11 years that MAMA only took place in South Korea.

On November 24, it was reported that Song Joong-ki was set to host the ceremony.

== Criteria ==
=== K-Pop Categories ===
All songs that are eligible to be nominated are songs released from October 24, 2019, to October 28, 2020.

Division	Online Voting	MAMA Professional Panel (Local + Foreign)	Music Sales	Record Sales	Social Media Voting	Global M/V View Counts
Artist of the Year Categories by Artist*	30%	30%	20%	20%	—	—
Song of the Year Categories by Genre**	20%	40%	30%	10%	—	—
Album of the Year	—	40%	—	60%	—	—
Best Music Video	—	70%	—	—	—	30%
Worldwide Icon of the Year Global Top 10 Fans' Choice***	60%	—	—	—	20%	20%
*Best New (M)ale/(F)emale Artist, Best M/F Artist, Best M/F Group **Best Dance Performance (Solo/M/F Group), Best Vocal Performance (M/F/Group), Best HipHop & Urban Music, Best Band Performance, Best Collaboration, Best OST ***Social Media (Twitter) Voting

=== Asia Music Categories ===
Artists from Japan, China, Thailand, Indonesia, India and Vietnam who've worked on songs released from October 1, 2019, to September 30, 2020.

=== Professional Categories ===
Music experts from South Korea, Japan, China, Thailand, India, Indonesia and Vietnam who participated in music related contents released from October 1, 2019, to September 30, 2020.

== Performers ==
(Note: All performance were pre-recorded in order to maintain social distancing due to COVID-19 pandemic.)

List of performers at 2020 MAMA
Name(s)	Song(s)	Notes/Stage Theme
Taemin	Intro + "Criminal" + "Heaven" + "Idea"	"The Dawn of a NEW-TOPIA"
Jessi	"Nunu Nana"	"I Am What I Am"
Hwasa	Intro + "María"	"I Am What I Am"
Jessi X Hwasa	"Gang" (MAMA Ver.) (Orig. Rain)	"I Am What I Am"
Park Sung-hoon of Enhypen	"Into the I-Land" (Piano Ver.)	"On The Borderline"
Enhypen	"Intro: Walk the Line" + "Given-Taken"	"On The Borderline"
Cravity	"Break All The Rules" + "Dramarama" (Orig. Monsta X) + "Shoot Out" (Orig. Monsta X)	"Heaven And Hell"
Monsta X	"Beastmode" + "Love Killa"	"Heaven And Hell"
Oh My Girl	"Nonstop"	"Total Eclipse"
(G)I-dle	"Dumdi Dumdi"	"Total Eclipse"
Oh My Girl (Mimi, Jiho, Arin) + (G)I-dle (Soojin, Soyeon & Yuqi)	"Bad Girl Good Girl" (Orig. Miss A)	"Total Eclipse"
Juyeon of The Boyz	"Open the Gate of Hell"	"Qui Fert Pondus Coronae Velit"
The Boyz	"The Beginning of the End (Reveal & Checkmate)"	"Qui Fert Pondus Coronae Velit"
Ateez	"Dona Eis Requiem (Inception & Answer)"	"Qui Fert Pondus Coronae Velit"
Stray Kids	"Victory Song" (MAMA ver.)	"Qui Fert Pondus Coronae Velit"
Juyeon of The Boyz + Hyunjin of Stray Kids + San of Ateez	"Triangular Fight"	"Qui Fert Pondus Coronae Velit"
JO1	"Infinity" + "Shine A Light"	"Infinite Light"
Treasure	"Boy" + "I Love You" + "MMM"	"Find Your TREASURE"
Tomorrow X Together	"Short Hair" (Orig. Cho Yong-pil) + "She Was Pretty" (Orig. Park Jin-young) + "Dynamite" (Orig. BTS) + "Blue Hour" (Dance Break ver.)	"Welcome To The DISCO"
Iz*One	"La Vie En Rose" + "Violeta" + "Fiesta" + "Secret Story of the Swan" + "Panorama"	"One-REELER"
Got7	"Not by the Moon" + "Last Piece"	"The Last Piece Of NEW-TOPIA"
Mamamoo	"Aya" + "Dingga" (Agrabah ver.)	"Promised Land"
Seventeen	"Left & Right" + "Home;Run"	"Door to YOUTHOPIA"
NCT U	"From Home" (Rearranged Ver.)	"Resonance Of NCT"
WayV	"Turn Back Time"	"Resonance Of NCT"
NCT Dream	"Ridin'"	"Resonance Of NCT"
NCT 127	"Kick It"	"Resonance Of NCT"
NCT	"Resonance"	"Resonance Of NCT"
Twice	"More & More" + "I Can't Stop Me" + "Cry for Me" (Note: Recorded at CJ E&M Studio in Ilsan)	"Paradise, Lost"
Winter of Aespa	"ID; Peace B"	"BoA 20th Anniversary Special"
(G)I-dle	"Listen to My Heart"	"BoA 20th Anniversary Special"
YooA of Oh My Girl	"Tree"	"BoA 20th Anniversary Special"
Kwon Eun-bi, Lee Chae-yeon, Choi Ye-na, Kim Chae-won of Iz*One	"Atlantis Princess"	"BoA 20th Anniversary Special"
BoA	"No. 1" + "Only One" (feat. Taemin) + "Better"	"You're Still My No. 1"
BTS	"On" (Note: Pre-recorded at Seoul World Cup Stadium (before Level 2 social distancing measure were implemented)) + "Dynamite" + "Life Goes On"	"On & On"

== Presenters ==
2020 Mnet Asian Music Awards host

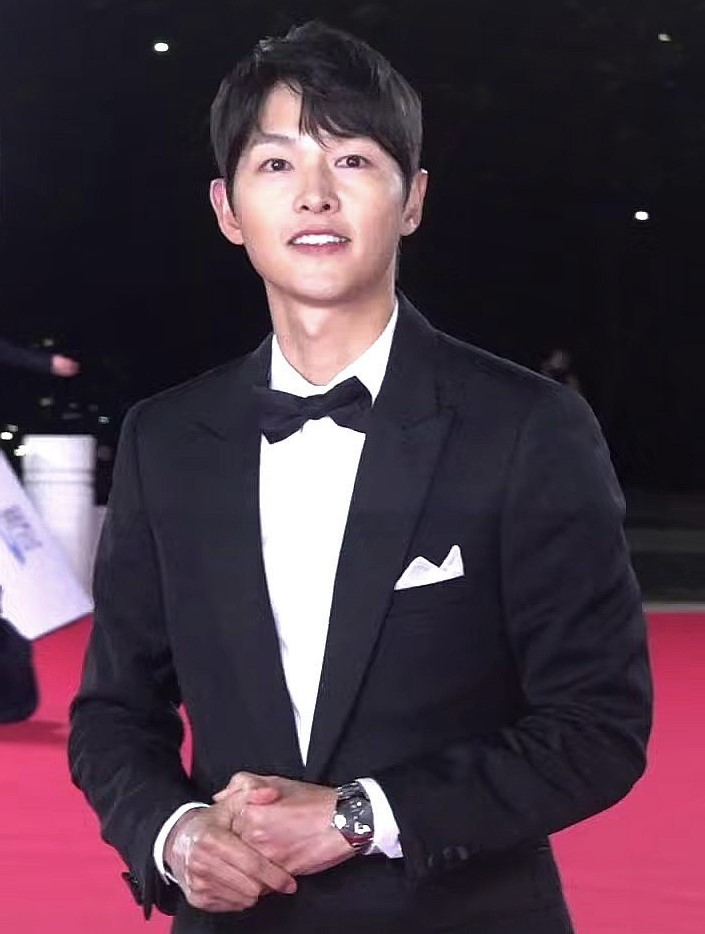
Song Joong-ki

The list of presenters was announced on December 1, 2020.

- Song Joong-ki – host, presented CJ ENM 2020 Visionary & Song of the Year
- Byeon Woo-seok & Hwang In-youp – Best New Male & Female Artist
- Bae Jung-nam & Lee Sun-bin – Best Dance Performance – Male and Solo & Discovery of the Year
- Lee Do-hyun & Go Bo-gyeol – Best Band Performance & Favorite Dance Performance – Female Solo
- Joo Woo-jae & Lee Yu-bi – Best of Next & Best Vocal Performance – Group
- James Corden (Note: Recorded at CBS Television City in Los Angeles) – Album of the Year
- Gong Myung & Choi Soo-young – Worldwide Fans' Choice
- Yoo Yeon-seok & Jung Kyung-ho – Worldwide Fans' Choice
- Im Soo-jung & Lee Da-hee – Worldwide Fans' Choice
- Yang Kyung-won & Park Ha-sun – Best Stage, Favorite Dance Performance – Group & Notable Achievement Artist
- Kim Ji-suk & Im Soo-hyang – Best Music Video & Favorite Asian Artist
- Lee Sang-yeob & Park Gyu-young – Favorite Female & Male Group
- Park Seo-joon – Worldwide Icon of the Year
- Yoon Park & Kang Han-na – Favorite Dance Performance – Male Solo & Favorite Global Performance
- Jung Moon-sung & Jeon Mi-do – Best Male Artist
- Gong Myung – BoA's 20th anniversary special & Inspired Achievement Award
- Jeon Hye-jin – Most Popular Artist
- Lee Jung-jae – Artist of the Year

== Winners and nominees ==
Winners are listed first and highlighted in bold. Online voting opened on the official MAMA website and Twitter an hour after the announcement of nominees on October 29, 2020. Voting ended on December 5, 2020.

=== Main awards ===
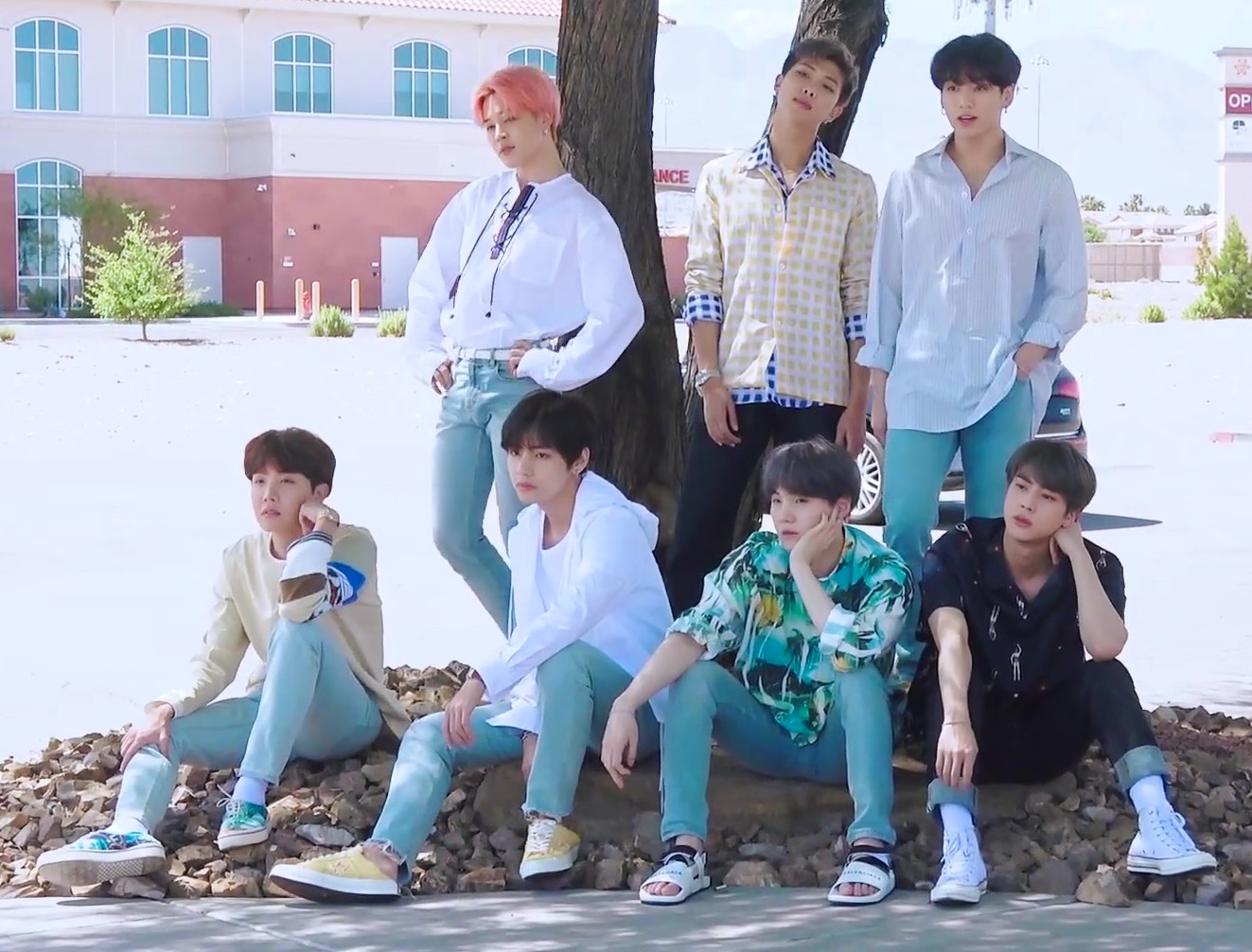
BTS won 9 awards, including Artist of the Year, Album of the Year, and Song of the Year.

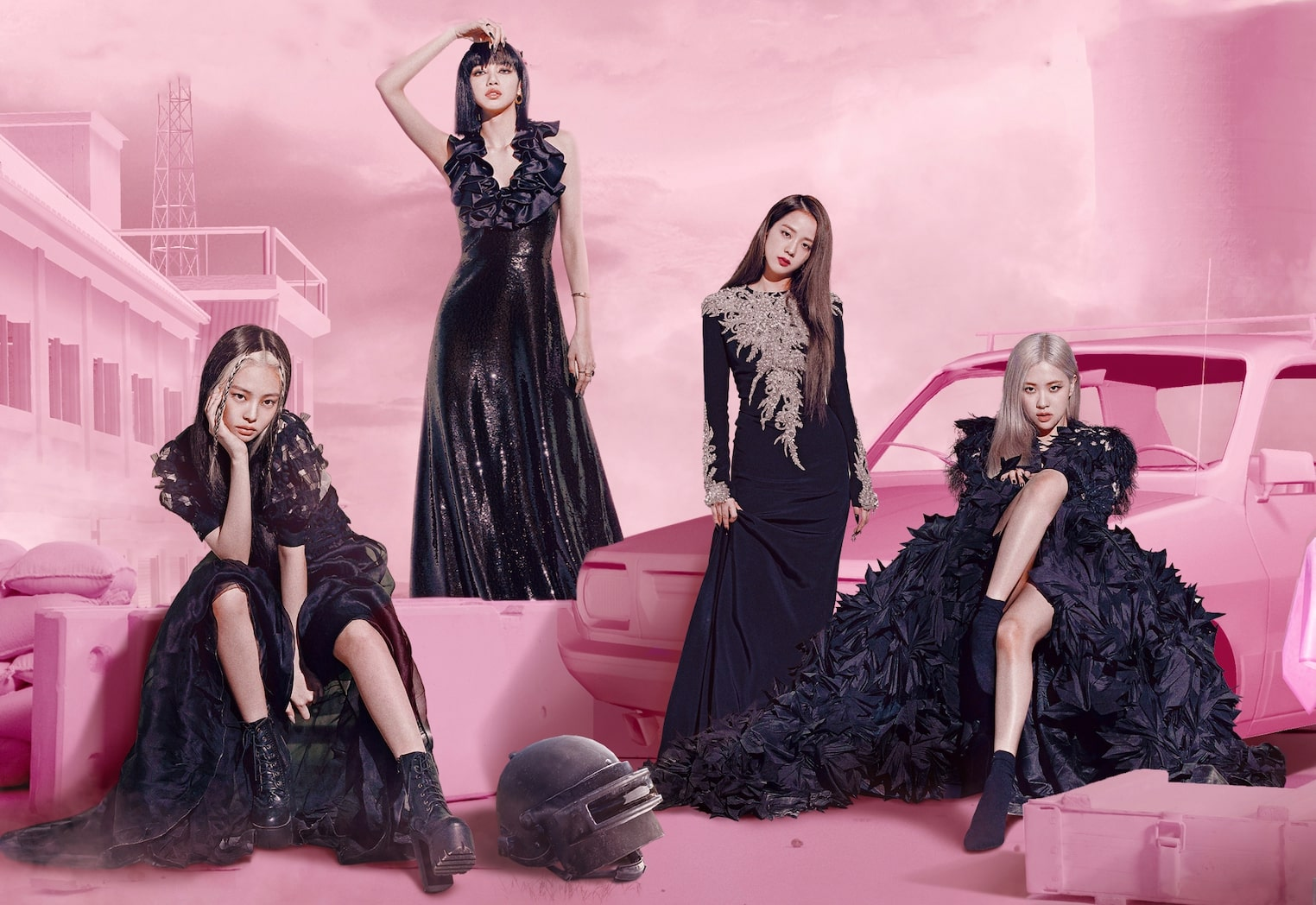
Blackpink won 4 awards, including Best Female Group and Best Dance Performance – Female Group.

Artist of the Year (Daesang)	Song of the Year (Daesang)
**BTS**; Blackpink; IU; Exo; Twice	**BTS – "Dynamite"**; Blackpink – "How You Like That"; Red Velvet – "Psycho"; IU – "Blueming"; Zico – "Any Song"
Album of the Year (Daesang)	Worldwide Icon of the Year (Daesang)
**BTS – Map of the Soul: 7**; Blackpink – The Album; Seventeen – Heng:garæ; IU – Love Poem; Baekhyun – Delight	**BTS**; NCT; Treasure; TXT; Got7; Ateez; Seventeen; Mamamoo; Twice; Blackpink
Best Male Group	Best Female Group
**BTS**; Exo; Got7; NCT; Monsta X; Seventeen	**Blackpink**; Twice; Red Velvet; Mamamoo; Iz*One; Oh My Girl
Best Male Artist	Best Female Artist
**Baekhyun**; Kang Daniel; Park Jin-young; Zico; Taemin	**IU**; Sunmi; Chungha; Taeyeon; Hwasa
Best Dance Performance – Male Group	Best Dance Performance – Female Group
**BTS – "Dynamite"**; Ateez – "Inception"; Exo – "Obsession"; NCT 127 – "Kick It"; TXT – "Can't You See Me?"; Seventeen – "Left & Right"	**Blackpink – "How You Like That"**; Itzy – "Wannabe"; Twice – "More & More"; Red Velvet – "Psycho"; Iz*One – "Secret Story of the Swan"; Oh My Girl – "Nonstop"
Best Dance Performance – Solo	Best Vocal Performance – Solo
**Hwasa – "Maria"**; Kang Daniel – "Who U Are?"; Sunmi – "Pporappippam"; Jessi – "Nunu Nana"; Taemin – "Criminal"	**IU – "Blueming"**; Baek Ye-rin – "Square"; Baekhyun – "Candy"; Jung Seung-hwan – "My Christmas Wish"; Taeyeon – "Spark"
Best Vocal Performance – Group	Best Collaboration
**Mamamoo – "Hip"**; Winner – "Hold"; Noel – "Late Night"; NU'EST – "I'm In Trouble"; Davichi – "Dear"	**IU X Suga – "Eight"**; Park Jin-young X Sunmi – "When We Disco"; Bolbbalgan4 X Baekhyun – "Leo"; Sung Si Kyung X IU – "First Winter"; Zico X Rain – "Summer Hate"
Best New Male Artist	Best New Female Artist
**Treasure**; Cravity; MCND; TOO; WEi	**Weeekly**; Secret Number; Woo!ah!; Natty; Cignature
Best Band Performance	Best OST
**Day6 – "Zombie"**; M.C the Max – "Bloom"; N.Flying – "Oh Really!"; Lee Nal Chi – "Tiger Is Coming"; Hyukoh – "Help"	**Gaho – "Start Over" (Itaewon Class)**; Baek Ye-rin – "Here I Am Again" (Crash Landing on You); Sandeul – "Slightly Tipsy" (She Is My Type); Joy – "Introduce Me A Good Person" (Hospital Playlist); Jo Jung-suk – "Aloha" (Hospital Playlist)
Best HipHop & Urban Music	Best Music Video
**Zico – "Any Song"**; Giriboy – "Eul" (Feat. BIG Naughty (Seo Dong-hyun)); Yumdda – "Amanda" (Feat. Simon Dominic); Lee Hi – "Holo"; Changmo – "Meteor"	**BTS – "Dynamite"**

=== Favorite Awards ===
Category	Winner
Worldwide Fans' Choice Top 10	NCT; Treasure; TXT; Got7; Ateez; Seventeen; Mamamoo; Twice; BTS; Blackpink
Favorite Dance Performance – Female Solo	Jessi – "Nunu Nana"
Favorite Dance Performance – Male Solo	Taemin – "Criminal"
Favorite Dance Performance – Group	TXT – "Can't You See Me?"
Favorite Asian Artist	WayV
Favorite Female Group	Iz*One
Favorite Male Group	NCT
Global Favorite Performer	Seventeen

=== Special awards ===
Category		Winner
Best Asian Artist	Japan	Official Hige Dandism
Best Asian Artist	Mandarin	G.E.M.
Best Asian Artist	Thailand	Ink Waruntorn
Best Asian Artist	Indonesia	Rizky Febian
Best Asian Artist	Vietnam	Binz
Best New Asian Artist	Japan	Fujii Kaze
Best New Asian Artist	Mandarin	Chih Siou
Best New Asian Artist	Thailand	Milli
Best New Asian Artist	Indonesia	Tiara Andini
Best New Asian Artist	Vietnam	Amee
Best New Asian Artist		JO1
Discovery of the Year		Ateez
Best of Next		Cravity
Best Stage		Monsta X
Notable Achievement Artist		Seventeen
Inspired Achievement		BoA
Most Popular Artist		Twice
2020 Visionary (CJ E&M)		Kim Eun-hee; Kim Tae-ho; Park Ji-eun; BTS; Bong Joon-ho; Blackpink; Rain; Song Kang-ho; Shin Won-ho; Yoo Jae-suk

=== Professional Categories ===
Category	Winner	Work
Best Executive Producer of the Year	Bang Si-hyuk	BTS
Best Producer of the Year	Pdogg	BTS - "ON"
Best Composer of the Year	Yovie Widianto	Tiara Andini - "Maafkan Aku #TerlanjurMencinta"
Best Engineer of the Year	Gu jong Pil & Kwon Nam Woo	Zico - "Any song"
Best Video Director of the Year	LUMPENS	BTS - "Dynamite"
Best Choreographer of the Year	Quang Dang	Binz - "Love Note"
Best Art Director of the Year	MU:E	BTS - "Dynamite"

=== Multiple Awards ===
The following artist(s) received three or more awards:

Awards	Artist(s)
9	BTS
4	Blackpink
3	IU
3	Seventeen
3	NCT / WayV

== Broadcast ==
The ceremony of the 2020 Mnet Asian Music Awards was broadcast live worldwide from Mnet in South Korea to simulcast across CJ E&M channels; other international networks, and online via Mnet K-pop and KCON's YouTube account and Mnet's official website. The live red carpet broadcast was cancelled due to safety protocols against COVID-19.

Country	Network	
Worldwide (Note: Restricted access on some countries due to broadcasting rights.)	YouTube (Mnet K-Pop & KCON), mwave.me	
United States	KCON USA	
South Korea	Mnet, TVING, O'live, XtvN	
Japan	Mnet Smart, Mnet Japan, au Smart Pass	
Hong Kong	JOOX, ViuTV, ViuTVsix, viu.tv	tvN Asia
Taiwan	FET Friday video, FET Friday Music	tvN Asia
Philippines	GigaFest (Smart Communications)	tvN Asia
Singapore	MeWATCH	tvN Asia
Indonesia	Indosiar, JOOX, Vidio	tvN Asia
Malaysia	JOOX	tvN Asia
Thailand	JOOX	tvN Asia
Myanmar	JOOX	tvN Asia
Maldives	tvN Asia	
Sri Lanka	tvN Asia	
Vietnam	FPT TV, Foxy	
Sub-Saharan Africa	tvN Asia (through DStv)	

== Controversies ==
=== Discrimination between actors and idols ===
On December 8, Dispatch released a report which described that the actors who took part in the ceremony as award presenters had been given waiting rooms and catering backstage. It has been also reported that only two idol teams received waiting rooms, and the others waited in an outdoor parking lot. Although the performance was pre-recorded, the winning scene was live, so it is known that the singers who attended had to wait in the vehicle for as little as one hour and as long as six hours. Restrooms for these artists are said to have been portable toilets outside, and some idols rented other accommodations nearby rather than have to sit in their cars. An official representative from an idol group confessed, "Most of the singers have a bad waist. It is hard to sit in the car for a long time," They continued, "Some singers rented separate accommodations and waited there." A source from 2020 MAMA spoke with No Cut News. They stated that while it would have been good to have provided separate spaces for everyone, they had to follow regulations to prevent the spread of COVID-19. “We are a music show and there is absolutely no reason that we would treat singers [negligently],” they stated. On December 9, Mnet again responded, "It is because there cannot be more than 100 people in one space in the second stage of distancing due to the COVID-19 quarantine rules. It was a situation where there was insufficient space in the waiting room, and it was not discriminating between singers and actors."

=== Map of Indonesia ===
An Indonesian map was shown in the broadcast live by Mnet while publicizing the enthusiasm of K-pop around the world. Indonesia was the country that voted the most in this event excluding South Korea. However, the map displayed was false. The map showed Sumatra Island and Java Island are joined, while Bali Island and Lombok Island, which are next to Java, have disappeared. West Nusa Tenggara, East Nusa Tenggara, and Maluku were also not marked. Sulawesi and Papua were too far apart.

=== Map of the Philippines ===
During the awards show, Mnet announced the Top 5 Regions sending the most love on MAMA 2020. However, the Philippines map shown was false. The islands of Palawan, Marinduque, Mindoro, and Romblon in Luzon were missing together with the Visayas, one of the three main land groups in the Philippines. Filipino fans also complained about only accessing the live stream through Smart Communications.

=== Poor working environment ===
On December 11, Dispatch released a report of the severe levels of dust particles that made vision and breathing difficult during artists' performance recordings. The '2020 MAMA' took place at the CJ ENM Contents World located in Paju, a construction site expected to be completed in 2023. According to the Paju City Hall Architecture Department, the construction progress is 30-40%. There were signs posted on the perimeter of the construction zone including "Caution: snakes", "Caution: fire hazards", and "Warning: drop hazards". Performance recordings took place in one of two completed buildings on-site, Studio 6. Each performing artist took to the stage at least two times, coming on and off the stage and the set for a duration of at least 4 hours. The reporters who visited the site noted that their throats hurt from inhaling the dust. CJ E&M responded that it was comfortable because it was a 'new building'. "At the time of recording, 100% of the air conditioning system was operating", but representatives from the K-Pop artists claimed that there were rehearsals and pre-recordings taking place until the morning of the ceremony. "They then removed the sets used for the pre-recordings and set up the live ceremony set immediately before the event."

According to a representative from the city of Paju, CJ ENM did receive approval from the city to carry out filming in Studio 5 and Studio 6, the two completed buildings at CJ ENM Contents World. However, dust particle levels at the construction site of CJ ENM Contents World have not undergone check-ups since the construction first began in 2019. The official continued, "We have not checked for fine dust separately before MAMA. There was no request at all for the related sector."
