= Full Moon (Sunmi song) =

Single by Sunmi featuring Lena

from the EP Full Moon
- Language: Korean
- Released: February 17, 2014
- Genre: Pop
- Length: 3:22
- Label: JYP Entertainment
- Songwriter: Brave Brothers
- Producer: Brave Brothers

Sunmi singles chronology
"You" (2013)	"Full Moon" (2014)	"Gashina" (2017)

Music video
- "Full Moon" on YouTube

"Full Moon" (Korean: 보름달; RR: Boreumdal) is a song recorded by South Korean singer Sunmi, featuring rapper Lena, for her first EP Full Moon. Written and produced by Brave Brothers, the song was released on February 17, 2014, by JYP Entertainment as the lead single from the EP.

== Background and release ==
The song marks JYP Entertainment and Brave Entertainment's first collaboration, as mentioned in the first verse of the song: "The first collaboration of JYP, and Brave Sound, here we come, Sunmi."

== Critical reception ==
The Korea Herald said that the song "delivers a fresh sound, gladly moving away from the typical musical style found on many recent JYP releases. The groovy brass and guitar riffs alongside sensual drumbeats blend in well with Sunmi's husky vocals. The hypnotic repetition of the chorus, “eh eh eh,” is addictive and adds to the seductive mood of the song."

== Music video ==
The music video, directed by Naive Creative Production, was released along with the song. As of July 2020, it has over 25.5 million views on YouTube.

== Credits and personnel ==
Credits adapted from Discogs.

- Sunmi – vocals
- Lena — featured vocals
- Brave Brothers – songwriting, composing, producing, arrangement, all instruments, programming
- Elephant Kingdom — composing, arrangement, all instruments, programming
- Lee Jung-min — arrangement, keyboard
- Nat Powers — programming, keys
- Oh Young-joon — guitar
- Maboos — background vocals
- Hyun Seung-hee — background vocals
- Um Se-hee – recording
- Phil Tan — mixing
- Daniela Rivera — mixing
- Brian Gardner — mastering

== Usage in media ==
Pearl and Garnet's fusion dance in the Steven Universe episode "Cry for Help" (which aired on July 13, 2015) was inspired by the choreography of "Full Moon" with storyboards timed to the song.

== Charts ==
=== Weekly charts ===
Chart (2014)	Peak position
South Korea (Gaon Digital Chart)	2
South Korea (K-pop Hot 100)	3
US World Digital Songs (Billboard)	13

=== Monthly charts ===
Chart (February 2014)	Peak position
South Korea (Gaon Digital Chart)	8

=== Year-end charts ===
Chart (2014)	Position
South Korea (Gaon)	57

== Accolades ==
=== Awards and nominations ===
Year	Award	Category	Result
2014	16th Mnet Asian Music Awards	Best Dance Performance – Solo	Won
2015	5th Gaon Chart Music Awards	Song of the Year – February	Nominated
2015	24th Seoul Music Awards	Bonsang Award	Nominated

=== Music program awards ===
Program	Date	Ref.
Inkigayo (SBS)	March 2, 2014	

== Release history ==
Region	Date	Format	Label
Various	February 17, 2014	Digital download, streaming	JYP Entertainment
