= Full Moon (Sunmi EP) =

EP by Sunmi
- Released: February 17, 2014
- Recorded: 2013–2014
- Language: Korean
- Labels: JYP Entertainment; KT Music
- Producer: Park Jin-young (executive)

Sunmi chronology
Full Moon (2014)	Warning (2018)

Singles from Full Moon
- 1. "24 Hours" Released: August 26, 2013; 2. "Full Moon" Released: February 17, 2014

Full Moon is the debut EP by South Korean singer Sunmi. It was released by JYP Entertainment on February 17, 2014.

== Background and release ==
In August 2013, it was announced that Sunmi would return to her musical career as a solo artist under JYP Entertainment and Park Jin-young himself would take over her complete production, including dance, MV, outfits, and the song. On August 11, Sunmi was announced to making her solo debut with single 24 Hours. The music video for the song was released on August 20, 2013, followed by its debut television performance on August 22, on M! Countdown. The digital single was released on August 26. "24 Hours" reached number 2 on the weekly Gaon Digital Charts and number 3 on Billboard's Korea K-Pop Hot 100 chart.

On January 31, Sunmi was announced will be making comeback with releasing her first extended play in February. Sunmi has scheduled making her comeback on February 17. On February 6, Sunmi revealed her first extended play Full Moon. On February 10, the album's tracklist was released, revealing that Wonder Girls' Yubin, GOT7's Jackson and JYP trainee Lena Park will featured on one of the tracks. The album also includes her debut single 24 Hours. "Full Moon" featuring Lena Park was released on February 17, along with the album and music video. The song reached number 2 on the weekly Gaon Digital Charts and number 3 on Billboard's Korea K-pop Hot 100.

== Track listing ==
No.	Title	Lyrics	Music	Arrangement	Length
1.	"Full Moon" (보름달; Boreumdal; featuring Lena)	Brave Brothers	Brave Brothers, Elephant Kingdom, Nat Powers	Brave Brothers, Elephant Kingdom, Lee Jung-min	3:23
2.	"24 Hours" (24시간이 모자라; Isipsasigani Mojara)	J.Y. Park "The Asiansoul"	J.Y. Park "The Asiansoul"	J.Y. Park "The Asiansoul", Nat Powers	3:23
3.	"Burn"	Tommy Park, Raphael	Tommy Park, Raphael	Tommy Park, Raphael	3:30
4.	"Who Am I" (내가 누구; Naega Nugu; featuring Yubin)	Kim Eun-su, Yubin	East4a	East4a	3:54
5.	"Frozen in Time" (멈춰버린 시간; Meomchwobeorin Sigan; featuring Jackson)	Chloe	Nodae, Bjerk	Nodae, Bjerk	4:40
6.	"If That Was You" (그게 너라면; Geuge Neoramyeon)	Ha:tfelt, Lee Woo-min	Ha:tfelt, Lee Woo-min	Ha:tfelt, Lee Woo-min	3:49
Total length:					22:39

Bonus track (Physical edition only)
No.	Title	Lyrics	Music	Arrangement	Length
7.	"If That Was You" (그게 너라면; Geuge Neoramyeon; featuring Yenny)	Ha:tfelt, Lee Woo-min	Ha:tfelt, Lee Woo-min	Ha:tfelt, Lee Woo-min	3:49
Total length:					26:28

== Charts ==
Chart	Peak position
South Korea Gaon Weekly Albums Chart	12
South Korea Gaon Monthly Albums Chart	23

== Sales ==
Chart	Sales
South Korea (Gaon)	5,394

== Release history ==
Region	Format	Date	Label
Various	Digital download	February 17, 2014	JYP Entertainment
South Korea	CD	February 17, 2014	JYP Entertainment, KT Music
