= Tail (song) =

2021 single by Sunmi

Single by Sunmi
- B-side: "What the Flower"
- Released: February 23, 2021
- Recorded: 2020–2021
- Genre: Dance; city pop
- Length: 3:10
- Label: Abyss Company
- Composers: Lee Sun-mi; Frants
- Lyricist: Lee Sun-mi
- Producer: Frants

Sunmi singles chronology
"Oh Yeah" (2020)	"Tail" (2021)	"You Can't Sit with Us" (2021)

Music video
- "Tail" on YouTube

"Tail" (Korean: 꼬리; RR: Kkori; stylized in all caps) is a song by South Korean singer and songwriter Sunmi. It was released as a standalone single on February 23, 2021, through Abyss Company. "Tail" was made available for digital download and streaming, and includes the B-side track "What the Flower". Both recordings were written by Sunmi, with additional production credits handled by Frants on "Tail" and Hong Song-jin on the B-side. The song is also notable for its distinctive choreography.

Musically, "Tail" is a dance and city pop song which conveys her instinctive feelings regarding love, similar to how "animals use their tail to express their emotions". Commercially, "Tail" peaked at number 22 on the Gaon Digital Chart.

== Background and release ==
On February 2, 2021, Sunmi's agency Makeus Entertainment (now named Abyss Company), stated that Sunmi is preparing to comeback at the end of February with a new release. On February 10, the singer announced the date of the release via Instagram. On February 15, the tracklist of the single was released. Concept photos and videos for both songs were released on February 17 and 18, as well as a track spoiler video the following day. The music video teaser for "Tail" was released on February 22, 2021. The single released digitally on February 23 along with the music video for the title track.

== Music and lyrics ==
Turning 30 this year in Korean age, the new single marked a milestone for Sunmi. "It's my first move taken in my 30s and I feel like I've taken a very daring step forward," she said. The disco lead single, "Tail" is a dance and city pop song about a "super sensitive cat woman villainess who wants love with all her heart, expressing her deepest instinctive feelings". Sunmi added: "Animals use their tail to express their emotions". The song features a unique sense of rhythm and a catchy melody. "What the Flower" is a soul-infused B-side track with her lush vocals moving nimbly across sparkling guitar work and warm piano.

== Critical reception ==
Professional ratings
Review scores
Source	Rating
IZM	3.5/5 stars
NME	4/5 stars

Sofiana Ramli of NME wrote that "the pair of songs work well together, presenting new facades to a beloved veteran performer". Writing for IZM, Stern stated that "Tail" is a "song that reveals Sunmi's concerns, who don't want to fall into mannerism".

The A-side song "Tail" won best song in the official 2021 Miyane fan club awards. In addition, the B Side "What the Flower" won the best B-side award for the same year.

== Track listing ==
Digital download, streaming
No.	Title	Lyrics	Music	Arrangement	Length
1.	"Tail" (꼬리)	Lee Sun-mi	Lee Sunmi; Frants	Frants	3:10
2.	"What the Flower" (꽃같네)	Lee Sunmi	Lee Sunmi; Hong So-jin	Hong	3:25
Total length:					6:35

== Credits ==
Credits adapted from Melon.

- Lee Sun-mi – vocals, lyrics, composition, arrangement
- Frants – composition, arrangement (1)
- Hong So-jin – composition, arrangement (2)

== Charts ==
=== Weekly charts ===
Weekly chart performance for "Tail"
Chart (2021)	Peak position
South Korea (Gaon)	22
South Korea (K-pop 100)	20
US World Digital Songs (Billboard)	13

Weekly chart performance for "What the Flower"
Chart (2021)	Peak position
US World Digital Songs (Billboard)	18

=== Monthly chart ===
Monthly chart performance for "Tail"
Chart (2021)	Peak position
South Korea (Circle)	35

=== Year-end chart ===
Year-end chart performance for "Tail"
Chart (2021)	Position
South Korea (Circle)	191

== Release history ==
Release dates and formats for "Tail"
Region	Date	Format	Label	Ref.
Various	February 23, 2021	Digital download; streaming	Abyss Company	
