= Noir (song) =

2019 single by Sunmi

Single by Sunmi
- Language: Korean
- Released: March 4, 2019
- Recorded: 2019
- Genre: Dance-pop; EDM
- Length: 3:29
- Label: Makeus
- Songwriter: Sunmi
- Producers: Sunmi; El Capitxn

Sunmi singles chronology
"Siren" (2018)	"Noir" (2019)	"Lalalay" (2019)

Music videos
- "Noir" on YouTube

Professional ratings
Review scores
Source	Rating
IZM	2.5/5 stars

"Noir" (Korean: 누아르; RR: Nuareu) is a song recorded by South Korean singer Sunmi. It was released on March 4, 2019, through Makeus, as a single. The track was written by Sunmi and produced by her and El Capitxn. "Noir" is a dance-pop and EDM track about "inevitable end of a relationship" similar to a noir film narrative. An official music video for the song was released in conjunction with the single on March 4, 2019. The video shows the singer as a clout-chasing influencer who fakes her lifestyle to make it look great on-screen in the hopes of getting followers and likes, even if it's dangerous.

== Background and release ==
From February to June 2019, Sunmi held her first world tour titled "Warning". She performed in 18 cities across Asia, America and Europe. Starting from February 24, a series of teasers were posted everyday for the singer's official social media accounts with the name of the single revealed to be "Noir" on February 25. The music video teaser was released on March 3, and the song officially premiered on March 4, 2019.

== Music video ==
The music video for "Noir" was directed by Choi Yongseok, who previously directed "Gashina", "Heroine" and "Siren". In the clip, Sunmi portrays our generation’s addiction to social media validation and ‘likes’–symbolized by the tiny heart-shaped candies she keeps consuming. She starts participating in various viral online challenges to garner more internet fame and fakes trips to exotic destinations for likes and popularity. Soon her actions escalate, with each challenge getting darker than the last until she begins to physically cause harm to herself, but seems unable to stop. Hashtags like "#nofilter" and "#followme" make appearances all through, but other than the comments on her social media posts she is alone, depicting the crushing loneliness and desperation of the "real world" that pushes people to social media. It was included in Rolling Stone India's list of 10 Best K-pop Music Videos of 2019.

== Charts ==
=== Weekly charts ===
Chart (2019)	Peak position
South Korea (Gaon Digital Chart)	8
South Korea (K-pop Hot 100)	9
US World Digital Song Sales (Billboard)	3

=== Year-end charts ===
Chart (2019)	Peak position
South Korea (Gaon)	130

== Release history ==
Region	Date	Format	Label
Various	March 4, 2019	Digital download, streaming	Makeus Entertainment
