= 24 Hours (Sunmi song) =

Single by Sunmi

from the EP Full Moon
- Released: August 26, 2013
- Genre: Dance-pop
- Length: 3:21
- Label: JYP Entertainment
- Songwriter: J. Y. Park
- Producer: J. Y. Park

Sunmi singles chronology
"24 Hours" (2013)	"You" (2014)

Music video
- "24 Hours" on YouTube

"24 Hours" (Korean: 24시간이 모자라; RR: 24sigani mojara; lit. '"24 Hours Is Not Enough"') is the solo debut single by South Korean singer Sunmi. It was released by JYP Entertainment on August 26, 2013. It was included in Sunmi's debut EP Full Moon which was released six months later.

== Background ==
The song marks "the very first project in 13 years that J. Y. Park went all in on, since Park Ji-yoon's "Coming-of-Age Ceremony." He wrote and composed the song while also overseeing the dance, the music video and the choreography.

== Composition ==
The song is described as "a hard-hitting pop track enhanced with a tango-inspired section."

== Music video ==
The music video, directed by Naive Creative Production, was released on August 20, 2013, six days before the single's release. As of July 2020, it has over 13.5 million views on YouTube.

== Credits and personnel ==
Credits adapted from liner notes from Full Moon. Recorded at JYPE Studios.

- Sunmi – vocals, background vocals
- J. Y. Park — songwriting, composing, producing, arrangement, all instruments, background vocals
- Hong Ji-sang — arrangement, all instruments, programming
- Kim Yong-woon — recording
- Lee Jae-won — recording
- Phil Tan — mixing
- Daniela Rivera — mixing
- Geoff Pesche — mastering

== Usage in media ==
The fourteenth episode of the YouTube Premium series Top Management was named after the song.

== Charts ==
=== Weekly charts ===
Chart (2013)	Peak position
South Korea (Gaon Digital Chart)	2
South Korea (K-pop Hot 100)	3

=== Monthly charts ===
Chart (February 2013)	Peak position
South Korea (Gaon Digital Chart)	16

=== Year-end charts ===
Chart (2013)	Position
South Korea (Gaon)	140

== Awards and nominations ==
Year	Award	Category	Result
2013	15th Mnet Asian Music Awards	Best Dance Performance – Solo	Nominated
2014	23rd Seoul Music Awards	Bonsang Award	Nominated

== Release history ==
Region	Date	Format	Label
Various	August 26, 2013	Digital download, streaming	JYP Entertainment
