= Sunmi =

South Korean singer (born 1992)

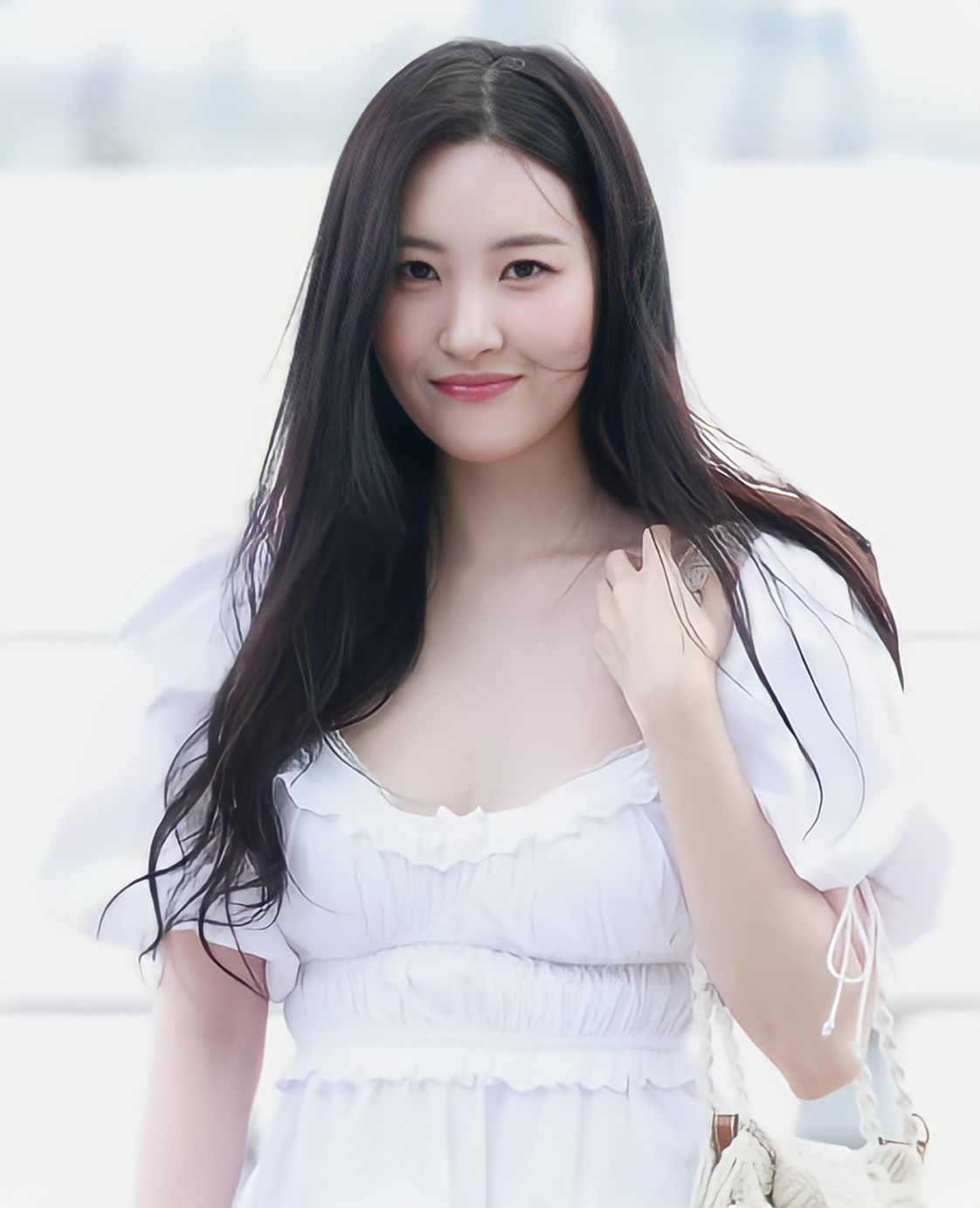
- Sunmi in July 2023
- Born: Sun Mi; May 2, 1992 (age 34); Iksan, North Jeolla, South Korea
- Other name: Mimi
- Education: Dongguk University
- Occupations: Singer; dancer; songwriter; record producer
- Musical career
- Genres: K-pop; disco-pop; synth-pop
- Instruments: Vocals; bass guitar
- Years active: 2007–2010; 2013–present
- Labels: JYP; Abyss Company
- Formerly of: Wonder Girls; JYP Nation

Korean name
- Hangul: 이선미
- Hanja: 李宣美
- RR: I Seonmi
- MR: I Sŏnmi

Former name
- Hangul: 선미
- Hanja: 宣美
- RR: Seon Mi
- MR: Sŏn Mi

Lee Sun-mi (Korean: 이선미; born Sun Mi, May 2, 1992), known mononymously as Sunmi, is a South Korean singer, dancer, songwriter and record producer. She debuted in 2007 as a member of South Korean girl group Wonder Girls and left the group in 2010 to pursue her studies. After a three-year hiatus, Sunmi resumed her career as a soloist with her 2013 debut extended play, Full Moon, spawning the number two singles "24 Hours" and "Full Moon" on the national Gaon Digital Chart.

In 2015, Sunmi was announced to be resuming promotion with the Wonder Girls and remained with the group until their disbandment in 2017. She subsequently left JYP Entertainment and joined Makeus Entertainment (now known as Abyss Company), releasing the hit single "Gashina". Her second extended play, Warning, was released in 2018 and produced two other hit singles: "Heroine" and "Siren".

== Early life ==
Sunmi was born on May 2, 1992, in Iksan, North Jeolla, South Korea. She attended Hwangnam Elementary School, Chungdam Middle School and Chungdam High School, and majored in musical theater at Dongguk University.

Sunmi revealed on a 2018 episode of Talkmon that she first decided to become a celebrity when she was 12 after her father was admitted to hospital due to complications of pulmonary tuberculosis. She was inspired by BoA, who debuted at the age of 13, and it was for her "the fastest way to make money" in order to take care of her mother and two younger brothers. She went to Seoul to audition and became a JYP Entertainment trainee at 14, though her father died three months before her debut with Wonder Girls. She later adopted her stepfather's surname Lee while in university and merged her original given name and surname, becoming Lee Sun-mi.

== Career ==
=== 2006–2012: Debut with Wonder Girls and hiatus ===
In May 2006, Sunmi was revealed as the fourth member of Wonder Girls, a girl group managed by JYP Entertainment. The group debuted with the single "Irony", on February 10, 2007, and quickly rose to stardom with their hits "Tell Me", "So Hot" and "Nobody" within two years of debuting. Sunmi participated with the group in American activities, touring alongside the Jonas Brothers, under the nickname Mimi.

In January 2010, JYP announced that Sunmi would be leaving the Wonder Girls the following month to focus on her education. In January 2012, the agency confirmed that Sunmi had taken a leave of absence from school to train at JYP, but that there were no definitive plans for her to resume activities.

=== 2013–2016: Solo debut with Full Moon and return to Wonder Girls ===
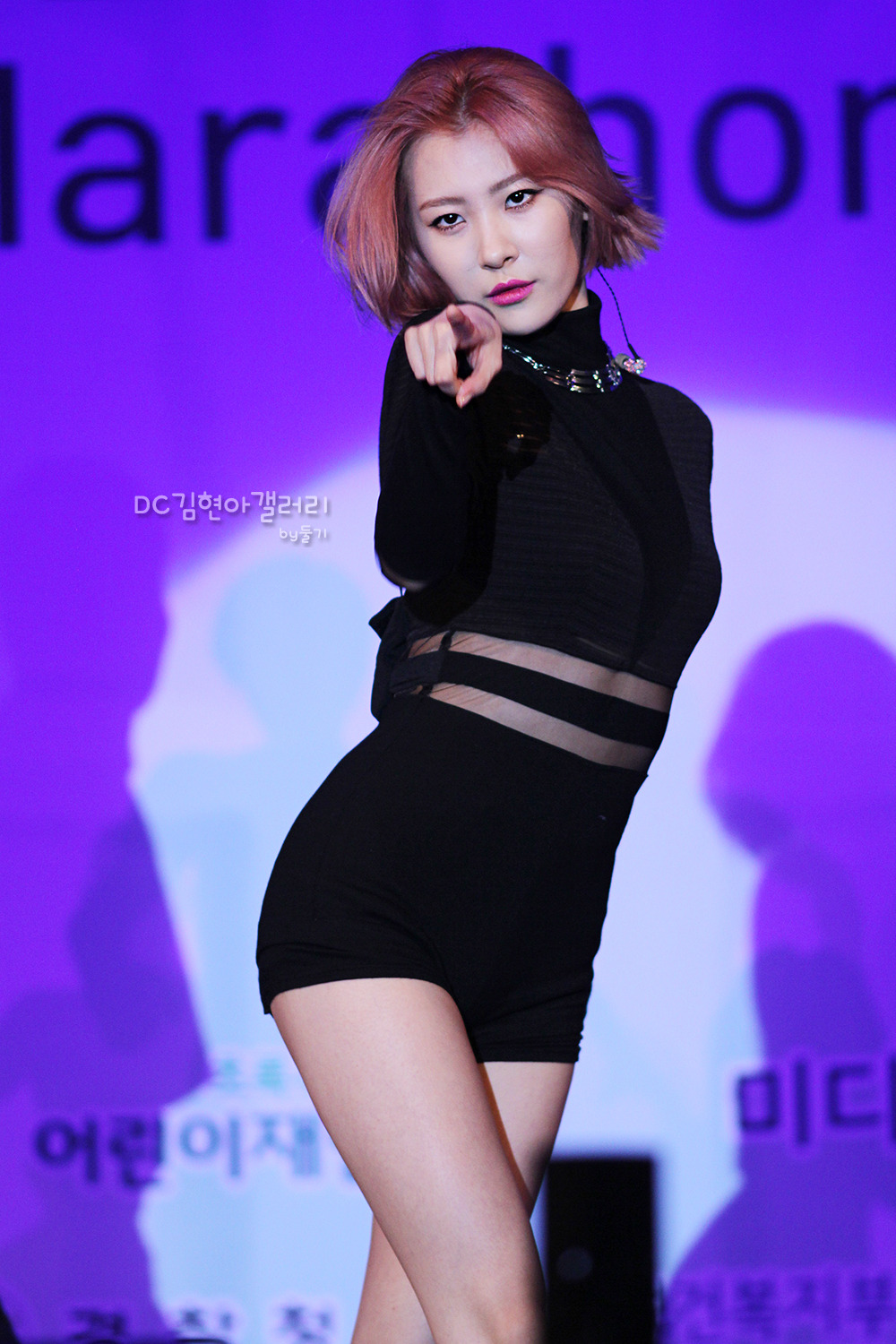
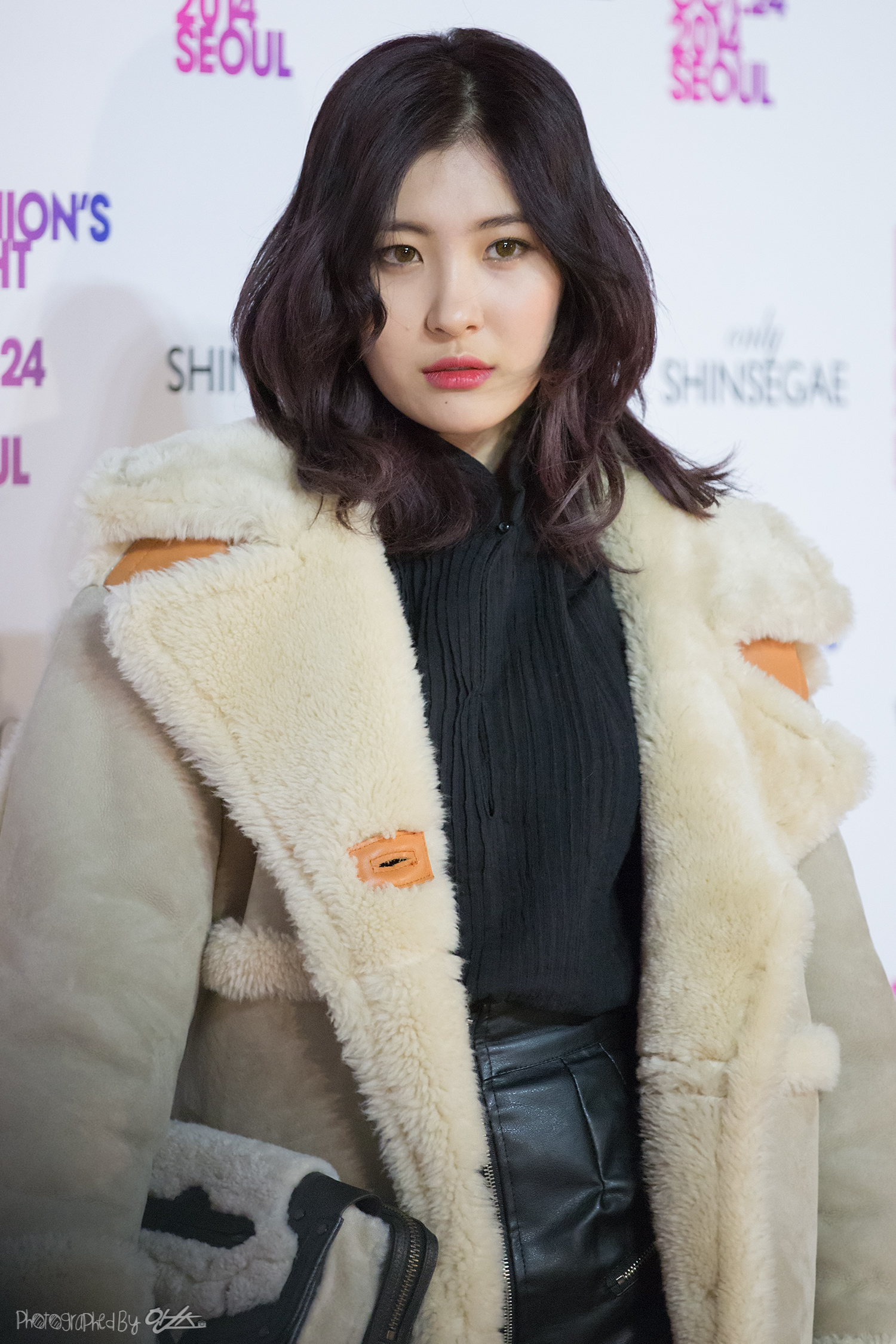
Sunmi in 2013 and 2014

In August 2013, Sunmi was announced to be returning to her music career, debuting as a solo artist. Sunmi made her solo debut on August 22, on Mnet's M! Countdown. Her debut single "24 Hours" was released on August 26, and subsequently achieved an all-kill on music charts. Subsequently, her debut extended play Full Moon was released on February 17, 2014, along with the promotional single of the same name. The latter peaked at number two on the Gaon Digital Chart and at number three on Billboard's K-pop Hot 100. "Full Moon" was praised for being innovative, and Sunmi was said to have delivered a classy rendition of "sexy".

On June 24, 2015, JYP Entertainment announced that Sunmi would be re-joining Wonder Girls for their comeback after the group's two-year hiatus. The group returned with a band concept, with Sunmi playing the bass. In August, the group's album Reboot was released, with Sunmi co-writing and co-producing three of its tracks. In 2016, Sunmi once again received songwriting and producing credits for a Wonder Girls release, this time for two songs on the band's single album "Why So Lonely", including the title track of the same name.

=== 2017–2019: Group disbandment, Warning, and world tour ===
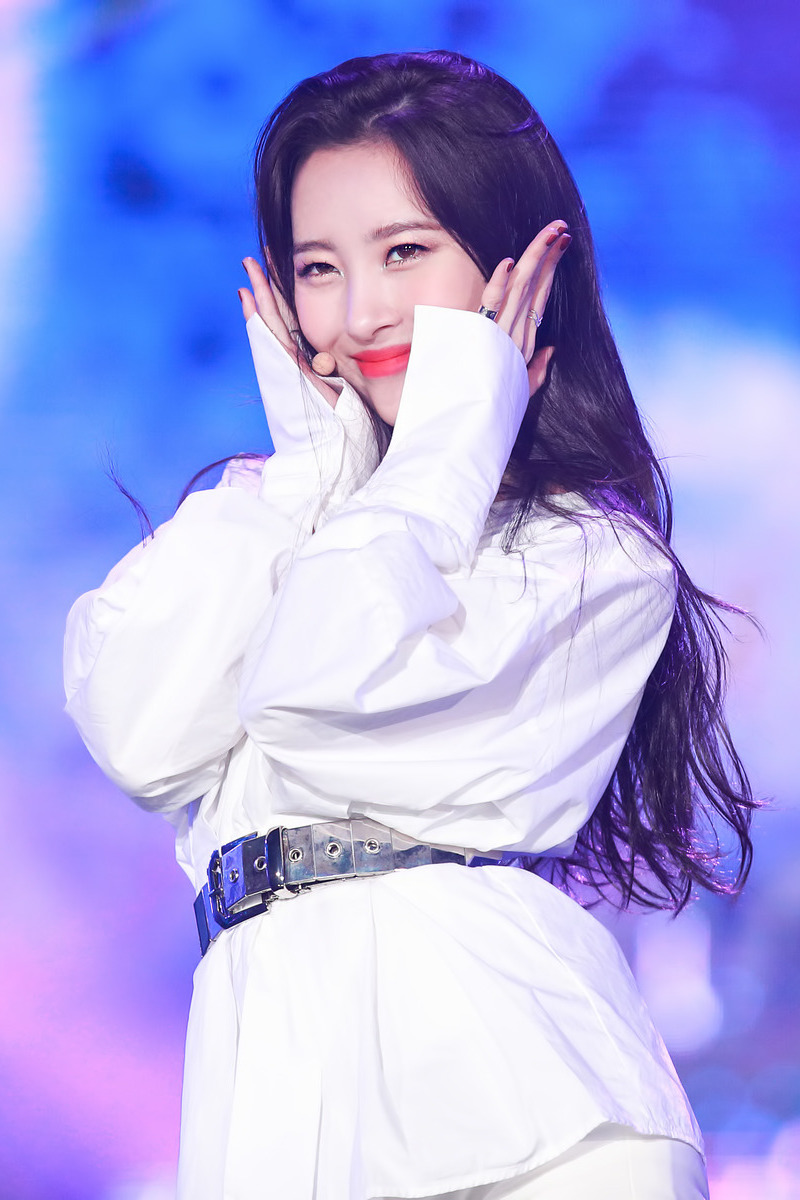
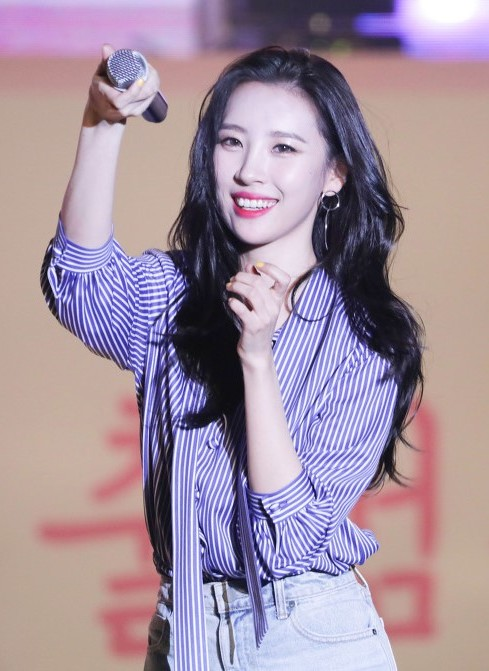
Sunmi performing in 2017 and 2018

On January 26, 2017, it was announced that Wonder Girls were to disband after unsuccessful contract renewal negotiations with members Yeeun and Sunmi. The group released their final single "Draw Me" on February 10, 2017, which also served as a celebration for their tenth anniversary.

In March, Sunmi signed with Makeus Entertainment. In August, she released her single "Gashina", produced by Teddy Park of The Black Label. The song debuted at number 2 on the Gaon Digital Chart before topping the chart the following week, and was named the third best K-pop song of 2017 by Billboard.

Sunmi returned with a single titled "Heroine" on January 18, 2018. She described the single as a prequel to "Gashina". On September 4, Sunmi released her second EP, titled Warning, along with the lead single, "Siren". "Siren" received an all-kill on six local music charts. Warning was named the third best K-pop album of 2018 by Billboard and Bravo. "Addict" was named the eighth best K-pop b-side of the year by MTV.

From February to June 2019, Sunmi held her first world tour, titled Warning. Tickets for the Seoul concert reportedly sold out in five seconds after opening. She performed in 18 cities across Asia, America and Europe. In the midst of the tour, on March 4, 2019, Sunmi released a single titled "Noir". After completing the world tour, she released the single "Lalalay" on August 27, 2019. Both singles peaked at number eight on the Gaon Digital Chart.

=== 2020–2023: 1/6 and second world tour ===
On February 6, 2020, Sunmi released the single "Gotta Go" as part of the original soundtrack of the web series XX, in which she made a cameo. On June 29, she released the single "Pporappippam", which reached number 5 on the Gaon Digital Chart. On July 22, she was selected as the exclusive model for the mobile game 요괴미식가; Yogoemisikga. On August 12, she and J.Y. Park released the duet "When We Disco", which peaked at number 3 on the Gaon Digital Chart and was later certified platinum for streaming by the Korea Music Content Association. In October, she featured on label mate Park Won's song "Oh Yeah" from his album My Fuxxxxx Romance.

Sunmi released her single "Tail" on February 23, 2021. Sunmi released her third EP 1/6 (One Sixth) on August 6, with the lead single "You Can't Sit with Us". On October 11, Sunmi released the new digital single "Go or Stop?", a collaboration with DWG KIA, a League of Legends esports team who won the 2020 World Championship.

On June 8, 2022, Sunmi's agency announced that she was preparing for a comeback with a single titled "Heart Burn" on June 29. On June 30, 2022, the agency announced Sunmi's world tour '2022 Sunmi Tour 'Good Girl Gone Mad' through its official SNS channel. It was held in Europe and North America, and wrapped up in Seoul in October 2022. After not releasing new music for over a year, Sunmi released the single "Stranger" on October 17, 2023.

=== 2024–present: Heart Maid ===
On June 13, 2024, Sunmi released the self-composed single "Balloon in Love". She released the single "Blue!" the following year on August 26, 2025. On November 5, 18 years after she made her debut as a singer, Sunmi released her first studio album Heart Maid. The album includes 13 tracks, including the lead single "Cynical".

== Artistry ==
=== Musical style and themes: "Sunmi-pop" ===
Sunmi is known in the K-pop industry to have created her own musical style called "Sunmi-pop". It maintains K-pop's core influences such as pop, disco, rock, traditional Korean music plus retro and city pop elements mixed with Sunmi's own defined music identity.

The concept of "Sunmi-pop" was first mentioned by Sunmi herself on You Hee-yeol's Sketchbook at the start of 2018. Later in the year, in an interview for 1TheK's YouTube channel published in September 2018, she revealed that her personal goal was to create her own music style named after herself. The interview was published at a time coinciding with the release of Warning (her first extended play since her renewal as a solo artist) and she referred to the newly published EP as "a stepping stone from which [she] can build [her] own music style".

One week ahead of the release of her single "Noir", she mentioned her main goal during a detailed interview for Billboard Korea, hoping that her musical style would become something that could inspire other artists. K-pop fans around the world started to acknowledge Sunmi's own musical identity by using for the first time the word "Sunmi-pop" in a few tweets, although the term became common on social media only after her fans used it to reply to a tweet posted by Sunmi herself. Even though the tweet itself didn't mention the term, Korean media and industry players started to officially recognize the word "Sunmi-pop" and implement it in articles and variety shows for the first time to describe Sunmi's music, reporting that she created her own style by applying her abilities in self-writing, self-composing and ideating performances.

On May 30, 2019, in London, right before going up on the stage of the Warning World Tour, an interviewer of the Korean media agency Yonhap News made known to Sunmi that a term to describe her musical style had been coined already as "Sunmi-pop". Thus the word "Sunmi-pop" gained its officiality, and on August 21, 2019, her agency Abyss Company (then known as Makeus Entertainment) also recognized the newly coined word by sharing an article from Naver News which dedicated a section to "Sunmi genre, Sunmi-pop" in anticipation of her comeback with "Lalalay".

==== Characteristics of "Sunmi-pop" ====
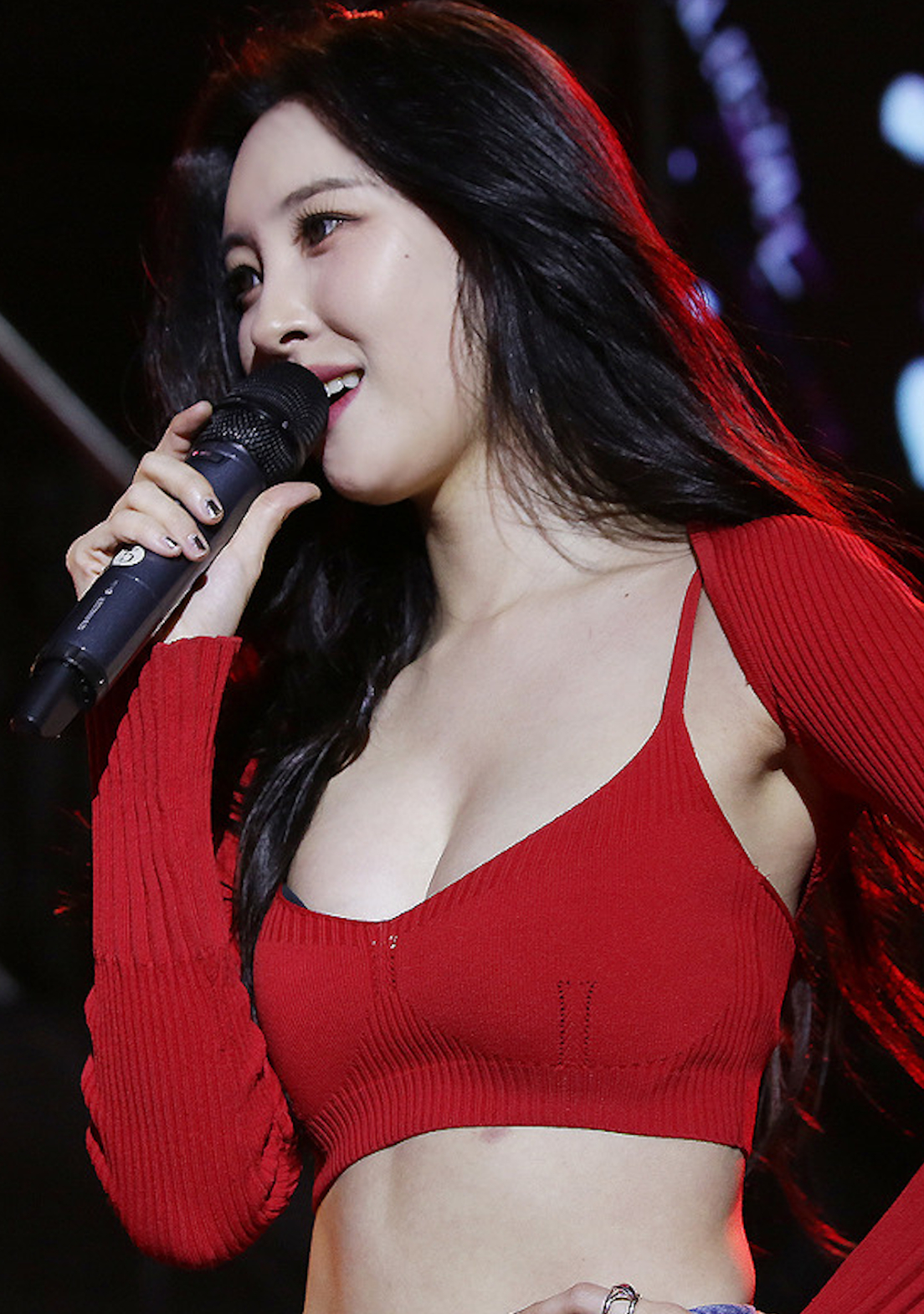
Sunmi performing at a university festival in 2023

The main characteristic of "Sunmi-pop" is defined by the emotions that the songs convey and provoke in the listener. According to Sunmi: "there's always a slightly sad emotion that permeates [my music] no matter how excitingly I sing the song" and "it's energetic and happy but with a sense of sadness". "Sunmi-pop" songs feature upbeat dance rhythms with lyrics marked by metaphors and double meanings that slightly conceal a sense of cynicism.

Since "Gashina", Sunmi's title tracks have featured double meanings and wordplays in the song title such as "Siren", expressing both the meaning of the warning sound and the mythological figure of the siren, and "Lalalay" which both refers to the act of flying [like a butterfly] and the word nallari (날라리) meaning 'punk' or 'party-goer' in Korean. Additionally, the songs "Gashina", "Heroine", "Siren", "Black Pearl", "Curve", "Lalalay" and "Tail" all present metaphors in the lyrics thus defining Sunmi's style of expression. Although "Sunmi-pop" songs mostly present an exciting and happy beat, Sunmi shared that her lyrics are often imbued with a sense of cynicism due to the fact that, in her real life, as a celebrity, she can't always express her true feelings. Metaphors, wordplays and double meanings are often expressed through choreographies that complement her work.

Though "Sunmi-pop" isn't constricted within a single music style or genre, electro-pop and retro elements are often associated with Sunmi's songs. The reason why these elements emerge is to be found in Sunmi's roots as a member of the Wonder Girls and her time in the US. Sunmi said in a 2021 interview that producer J. Y. Park wanted her and the other members to "broaden [their] understanding of the different music styles of different eras" focusing especially on retro concepts and Motown artists, which she ended up liking. In a Billboard interview she revealed: "Personally, I like music from the '70s, '80s, and '90s, so I try to find instrumentals and sounds that evoke those periods and work them into my music".

"Sunmi-pop" is also considered by Sunmi to be a combination of popularity and identity. On the April 2021 issue of L'Officiel Singapore, Sunmi explained: "I always try to come up with fun and easy ways to approach a range of people, while keeping the original emotions in myself". While her aesthetic or themes are considered to be niche, her goal is to remain inside the world of popular music.

Another key element of "Sunmi-pop" is dynamism: Sunmi shared her wish of wanting to try new ideas every time, like working with other producers, and explore new genres by showing a different range of themes, aesthetics and sounds through the years.

== Personal life ==
=== Health ===
Sunmi has been diagnosed with borderline personality disorder, which she wrote about in her song "Borderline", released in August 2021.

== Discography ==
- Heart Maid (2025)

== Videography ==
=== Music videos ===
Title	Year	Director	Ref.
"24 Hours"	2013	Naive Creative Production	
"Full Moon"	2014	Naive Creative Production	
"Gashina"	2017	Choi Yongseok (Lumpens)	
"Heroine"	2018	Choi Yongseok (Lumpens)	
"Siren"	2018	Choi Yongseok (Lumpens)	
"Noir"	2019	Choi Yongseok (Lumpens)	
"Lalalay"	2019	Choi Yongseok (Lumpens)	
"Gotta Go" (Dance Performance)	2020	NOVVKIM (NOVV)	
"Pporappippam"	2020	Ziyong Kim (Fantazy Lab)	
"BORDERLINE"	2020	NEWSTONE (KAK STUDIO)	
"When We Disco"	2020	Naive Creative Production	
"Tail"	2021	Paranoid Paradigm (VM Project Architecture)	
"You Can't Sit with Us"	2021	Seong Wonmo (Digipedi)	
"Go or Stop?"	2021	Pixelzero (PXZO)	
"Heart Burn"	2022	Seong Wonmo (Digipedi)	
"Stranger"	2023	Seong Wonmo (Digipedi)	
"Balloon in Love"	2024	Kim Min-jae	
"Blue!"	2025	Seong (Digipedi)	
"CYNICAL"	2025	Digipedi	
"Forever July"	2026	Kim Min-jae	

== Filmography ==
=== Television series ===
Year	Title	Role	Notes	Ref.
2015	The Producers	Herself	Cameo (Episode 3)	

=== Web series ===
Year	Title	Role	Notes	Ref.
2018	YG Future Strategy Office	Herself	Cameo (Episode 4)	
2020	XX	Customer	Cameo (Teaser)	

=== Television shows ===
Year	Title	Role	Notes	Ref.
2014	Fashion King Korea	Contestant (Season 2)		
2018	Secret Unnie	Cast	with Kang Seul-gi (Ep. 3–9) with Kim Hyo-yeon and Han Chae-young (Ep. 9) with Han Chae-young, Kang Seul-gi and Kim Ye-ri (Ep. 16)	
2020	Running Girls	Cast member	with Hani, YooA, Chungha and Chuu	
2020–present	Sing Again	Judge	Season 1–3	
2021	Girls Planet 999	Mentor		
2023	Boys Planet	Star master	Episode 2	

=== Web shows ===
Year	Title	Role	Notes	Ref.
2020	RReal World	Regular host	with her two brothers	
2022–2023	Sunmi's Show! Interview	Host	YouTube SBS	

== Concerts and tours ==
=== Sunmi the 1st World Tour: Warning ===
Tour dates
Date	City	Country	Venue
February 24, 2019	Seoul	South Korea	Yes24 Live Hall
March 6, 2019	San Francisco	United States	Regency Ballroom
March 7, 2019	Los Angeles	United States	The Fonda Theatre
March 10, 2019	Seattle	United States	Showbox SoDo
March 11, 2019	Vancouver	Canada	Vogue Theatre
March 13, 2019	Calgary	Canada	The Palace Theatre
March 15, 2019	New York City	United States	The Town Hall
March 16, 2019	Toronto	Canada	Queen Elizabeth Theatre
March 18, 2019	Washington, D.C.	United States	Lincoln Theatre
March 21, 2019	Mexico City	Mexico	Auditorio BB
April 13, 2019	Hong Kong	China	KITEC Star Hall
May 10, 2019	Taipei	Taiwan	Taiwan University Sports Centre
May 23, 2019	Tokyo	Japan	Tsutaya O-East
May 30, 2019	London	United Kingdom	Indigo at The O2
June 2, 2019	Warsaw	Poland	Progresja
June 4, 2019	Amsterdam	Netherlands	Q-Factory
June 6, 2019	Berlin	Germany	Huxley's Neue Welt
June 7, 2019	Paris	France	La Cigale
June 15, 2019	Seoul	South Korea	Yes24 Live Hall

=== 2022 Sunmi Tour: Good Girl Gone Mad ===
Tour dates
Date	City	Country	Venue	Attendance
August 14, 2022	Warsaw	Poland	Progresja	—
August 17, 2022	Madrid	Spain	Palacio Vistalegre	—
August 19, 2022	Offenbach	Germany	Capitol Theater	—
August 21, 2022	London	United Kingdom	Troxy	3,000
August 23, 2022	Amsterdam	Netherlands	Melkweg	—
August 26, 2022	Paris	France	Salle Pleyel	—
August 28, 2022	Helsinki	Finland	Kulttuuritalo	—
September 2, 2022	Chicago	United States	Riviera Theatre	—
September 4, 2022	New York City	United States	Terminal 5	3,000
September 6, 2022	Toronto	Canada	Massey Hall	—
September 8, 2022	Atlanta	United States	Tabernacle	—
September 10, 2022	Seattle	United States	Showbox SoDo	—
September 12, 2022	Los Angeles	United States	Wiltern Theatre	—
September 13, 2022	San Francisco	United States	Warfield Theatre	—
September 15, 2022	Vancouver	Canada	Queen Elizabeth Theatre	—
October 8, 2022	Seoul	South Korea	Yes24 Live Hall	—

=== Online concerts ===
- Good Girl Gone Mad (2021)

== Awards and nominations ==
Name of the award ceremony, year presented, award category, nominee of the award, and the result of the nomination
Award ceremony	Year	Category	Nominee/work	Result	Ref.
Asia Artist Awards	2018	Artist of the Year, Singer	Sunmi	Won	
Asia Artist Awards	2018	Best Music Award	Sunmi	Won	
Asia Artist Awards	2021	Female Solo Singer Popularity Award	Sunmi	Nominated	
Asian Pop Music Awards	2020	Best Female Singer (Overseas)	"pporappippam"	Nominated	
Asian Pop Music Awards	2020	Best Lyricist (Overseas)	"pporappippam"	Nominated	
Asian Pop Music Awards	2021	Best Lyricist (Overseas)	"Borderline"	Won	
Asian Pop Music Awards	2021	Top 20 Albums of the Year (Overseas)	1/6	Won	
Asian Pop Music Awards	2021	Top 20 Songs of the Year (Overseas)	"You Can't Sit with Us"	Won	
Asian Pop Music Awards	2022	Top 20 Songs of the Year (Overseas)	"Heartburn"	Won	
Brand Customer Loyalty Awards	2021	Best Female Solo Artist	Sunmi	Nominated	
CJ E&M America Awards	2017	Female Idol of the Year	Sunmi	Won	
Elle Style Awards	2018	Best Music Icon	Sunmi	Won	
Fashionista Awards	2016	Best Dresser – Female	Sunmi	Nominated	
Fashionista Awards	2017	Best Fashionista – SNS Division	Sunmi	Nominated	
Gaon Chart Music Awards	2015	Song of the Year – February	"Full Moon"	Nominated	
Gaon Chart Music Awards	2018	Song of the Year – August	"Gashina"	Won	
Gaon Chart Music Awards	2019	Song of the Year – January	"Heroine"	Nominated	
Gaon Chart Music Awards	2019	Song of the Year – September	"Siren"	Nominated	
Gaon Chart Music Awards	2020	Song of the Year – August	"Lalalay"	Won	
Gaon Chart Music Awards	2021	Song of the Year – June	"pporappippam"	Nominated	
Gaon Chart Music Awards	2021	Song of the Year – August	"When We Disco" (with Park Jin-young)	Nominated	
Genie Music Awards	2018	Artist of the Year	Sunmi	Nominated	
Genie Music Awards	2018	Female Artist Award	Sunmi	Nominated	
Genie Music Awards	2018	Genie Music Popularity Award	Sunmi	Nominated	
Genie Music Awards	2019	The Female Solo Artist	Sunmi	Nominated	
Genie Music Awards	2019	Performing Artist (Female)	Sunmi	Nominated	
Golden Disc Awards	2018	Digital Bonsang	"Gashina"	Nominated	
Golden Disc Awards	2018	Global Popularity Award	Sunmi	Nominated	
Golden Disc Awards	2019	Digital Bonsang	"Heroine"	Nominated	
Golden Disc Awards	2019	Popularity Award	Sunmi	Nominated	
Golden Disc Awards	2021	Curaprox Popularity Award	Sunmi	Nominated	
Golden Disc Awards	2021	QQ Music Popularity Award	Sunmi	Nominated	
Korea First Brand Awards (Note: Hosted by the Korea Consumer Brand Committee and the Korea Consumer Forum, the Korea First Brand Awards bases its winners on a nationwide South Korean survey.)	2018	Most Anticipated Female Solo Singer	Sunmi	Nominated	
Korea Popular Music Awards (Note: Created in 2018 by the Korea Singers Association, the Korea Entertainment Producer's Association, the Recording Industry Association of Korea, the Federation of Korean Music Performers, and the Korea Music Copyright Association, the Korea Popular Music Awards is designed to honor leaders in the hallyu wave.)	2018	Best Artist	Sunmi	Nominated	
Korea Popular Music Awards	2018	Popularity Award	Sunmi	Nominated	
Korea Popular Music Awards	2018	Best Digital Song	"Siren"	Nominated	
Korea Popular Music Awards	2018	Best Solo Dance Track	"Siren"	Nominated	
Korean Brand of the Year Awards (Note: The Korean Brand of the Year Awards selects the biggest brands from a large collection of categories via online voting.)	2019	Female Solo Artist	Sunmi	Won	
Korean Music Awards	2018	Best Pop Song	"Gashina"	Nominated	
Melon Music Awards	2017	Best Dance – Female	"Gashina"	Nominated	
Melon Music Awards	2018	Top 10 Artists	Sunmi	Nominated	
Mnet Asian Music Awards	2013	Best Female Artist	Sunmi	Nominated	
Mnet Asian Music Awards	2013	Best Dance Performance – Female Solo	"24 Hours"	Nominated	
Mnet Asian Music Awards	2014	Best Female Artist	Sunmi	Nominated	
Mnet Asian Music Awards	2014	Best Dance Performance – Solo	"Full Moon"	Won	
Mnet Asian Music Awards	2017	Best Female Artist	Sunmi	Nominated	
Mnet Asian Music Awards	2017	Style in Music	Sunmi	Won	
Mnet Asian Music Awards	2017	Best Dance Performance – Solo	"Gashina"	Nominated	
Mnet Asian Music Awards	2018	Best Female Artist	Sunmi	Won	
Mnet Asian Music Awards	2018	Best Dance Performance – Female Solo	"Siren"	Nominated	
Mnet Asian Music Awards	2019	Best Dance Performance – Solo	"Lalalay"	Nominated	
Mnet Asian Music Awards	2019	Song of the Year	"Lalalay"	Nominated	
Mnet Asian Music Awards	2019	Worldwide Fans' Choice Top 10	Sunmi	Nominated	
Mnet Asian Music Awards	2020	Best Female Artist	Sunmi	Nominated	
Mnet Asian Music Awards	2020	Artist of the Year	Sunmi	Nominated	
Mnet Asian Music Awards	2020	Worldwide Icon of the Year	Sunmi	Nominated	
Mnet Asian Music Awards	2020	Best Dance Performance – Solo	"pporappippam"	Nominated	
Mnet Asian Music Awards	2020	Song of the Year	"pporappippam"	Nominated	
Mnet Asian Music Awards	2020	Song of the Year	"When We Disco" (with Park Jin-young)	Nominated	
Mnet Asian Music Awards	2020	Best Collaboration	"When We Disco" (with Park Jin-young)	Nominated	
SBS MTV Best of the Best	2014	Best Female Solo	Sunmi	Nominated	
Seoul Music Awards	2014	Bonsang Award	"24 Hours"	Nominated	
Seoul Music Awards	2014	Popularity Award	Sunmi	Nominated	
Seoul Music Awards	2015	Bonsang Award	"Full Moon"	Nominated	
Seoul Music Awards	2015	Popularity Award	Sunmi	Nominated	
Seoul Music Awards	2015	Hallyu Special Award	Sunmi	Nominated	
Seoul Music Awards	2018	Bonsang Award	"Gashina"	Nominated	
Seoul Music Awards	2018	Popularity Award	Sunmi	Nominated	
Seoul Music Awards	2018	Hallyu Special Award	Sunmi	Nominated	
Seoul Music Awards	2019	Bonsang Award	"Siren"	Nominated	
Seoul Music Awards	2019	Popularity Award	Sunmi	Nominated	
Seoul Music Awards	2019	Hallyu Special Award	Sunmi	Nominated	
Seoul Music Awards	2020	Dance Performance Award	"Lalalay"	Nominated	
Seoul Music Awards	2020	Hallyu Special Award	Sunmi	Nominated	
Seoul Music Awards	2020	Popularity Award	Sunmi	Nominated	
Seoul Music Awards	2020	QQ Music Most Popular K-Pop Artist Award	Sunmi	Nominated	
Seoul Music Awards	2024	Main Award (Bonsang)	Sunmi	Won	
Soribada Best K-Music Awards	2018	Bonsang Award	Sunmi	Nominated	

=== Listicles ===
Name of publisher, year listed, name of listicle, and placement
Publisher	Year	Listicle	Rank	Ref.
Forbes	2018	Korea Power Celebrity	29th	
Forbes	2019	Korea Power Celebrity	24th	
