= You Can't Sit with Us (song) =

2021 single by Sunmi

Single by Sunmi

from the EP 1/6
- Language: Korean; English
- Released: August 6, 2021
- Recorded: 2021
- Genre: Synthwave; dance-pop; synth-pop
- Length: 3:17
- Label: Abyss Company
- Composers: Melanie Fontana; Michel Schulz; Ross Golan
- Lyricist: Sunmi

Sunmi singles chronology
"Tail" (2021)	"You Can't Sit with Us" (2021)	"Go or Stop?" (2021)

Music video
- "You Can't Sit with Us" on YouTube

Logo for the single

"You Can't Sit with Us" is a song recorded by South Korean singer Sunmi. It was released on August 6, 2021, through Abyss Company, as the lead single from the singer's third extended play, 1/6. The song was written by Sunmi and was composed by Melanie Fontana, Michel Schulz and Ross Golan.

== Background and release ==
On July 14, 2021, Sunmi's label Abyss Company confirmed in a statement to Newsen that the singer is in the midst of preparations for a "new album" and is "aiming for an August comeback". On July 19, the singer revealed that her new music would be released on August 6, 2021. Sunmi unveiled the album's track listing on her official social media accounts and website, revealing "You Can't Sit with Us" as the lead single on July 26. The music video teaser for the song was released on August 1. "You Can't Sit with Us" was released for digital download and streaming as the lead single from 1/6 on August 6, 2021, by Abyss Company.

During an online media conference, Sunmi stated that she wanted to show "a lighter and more natural appearance" with the song. On August 17, the singer appeared on KBS Cool FM's Raise the volume of Hanna Kangand and described the track as "the most lively song among my songs."

== Composition ==
"You Can't Sit with Us" was written by Sunmi, while the composition was handled by Melanie Fontana, Michel Schulz and Ross Golan. The song is a synthwave-inspired song characterized by a distinct '80s dance-pop style with powerful synth. The song features a fast beat, addictive chorus, Sunmi's "breathy" vocals and aside from demonstrating her abilities as a vocalist, the singer is also seen exercising her rap skills. Its title was taken from a line in the 2004 film Mean Girls. The track summarizes the frustration and anger one experiences when they're at a crossroads with their lover. In terms of musical notation, the song is composed in the key of D minor, with a tempo of 145 beats per minute, and runs for three minutes and seventeen seconds.

== Music video ==
An accompanying music video for the song, made by the Digipedi video production team, (Note: Digipedi's logo can be seen at the infocard in the music video) was released at midnight on August 6, 2021, along with the rest of 1/6. The video was inspired by the 2000s generation. Sunmi revealed that to film the zombie apocalypse scenes, she had to receive training from the stunt director behind the Netflix series Kingdom and the movie Train to Busan. After one day, the music video reached 10 million views, making it the singer's fastest video to do so. In a behind-the-scenes clip from the set of the "You Can’t Sit with Us" music video, the singer revealed that Marilyn Monroe inspired the choreography for the track. The music video topped the K-Pop Radar Weekly YouTube Views Chart with 33 million views during its second week.

=== Synopsis ===
A scene in the "You Can't Sit with Us" music video, where Sunmi and her friends are surrounded by a horde of undead, after which they break out in a full on gunfight with the zombies.

The music video begins with Sunmi lounging in her bedroom, seemingly irritated by frequent calls from her ex. As the song proceeds, she opens the window to find him standing below her building holding a placard that reads "Forgive Me." Frustrated and annoyed, she begins to start tossing items out of her window, including a flowerpot that ends up smashing into her ex's head and presumably killing him. Sunmi then later heads to in a retro-themed DVD rental store with her friends, where they browse through the shelves. Suddenly, they are interrupted by a horde of zombies surrounding the store, with Sunmi's ex appearing as a zombie in the midst of the crowd, holding the same placard from earlier before.

As the zombies break into the store, the three women then uncover their ammunition and proceed to take down the undead one after the other. At the end of the battle, the singer faces her ex who gets down on one knee to propose. An elated Sunmi instantly runs into his arms – the two then remain in each other's embrace as they are surrounded by police officials. An epilogue to the music video released August 13. The epilogue depicts Sunmi dancing with her lover, before finally hugging him tightly as they are surrounded by the police.

== Chart performance ==
"You Can't Sit with Us" debuted at number 120 on the South Korean Gaon Digital Chart and the next week the song peaked at number 46. In the US, the song debuted at number 10 on the Billboard World Digital Song Sales. With this release, the singer has appeared inside the top 10 on the ranking as a soloist with at least seven tracks.

== Credits and personnel ==
Credits are adapted from Melon,

- Sunmi – vocals, songwriter
- Melanie Fontana – songwriter
- Michel Schulz – songwriter
- Ross Golan – songwriter
- Jay-p Gu – audio mixing
- Choi Ja Yeon – record engineering
- Kwon Nam-woo – audio mastering

== Charts ==
=== Weekly charts ===
Weekly chart performance for "You Can't Sit with Us"
Chart (2021)	Peak position
Singapore (RIAS)	17
South Korea (Gaon)	46
South Korea (Kpop Hot 100)	47
US World Digital Songs (Billboard)	10

=== Monthly charts ===
Monthly chart performance for "You Can't Sit with Us"
Chart (2021)	Peak position
South Korea (Circle)	89

== Release history ==
Release formats for "You Can't Sit with Us"
Region	Date	Format	Label	Ref.
South Korea	August 6, 2021	Digital download, streaming	Abyss Company	
Various	August 6, 2021	Digital download, streaming	Abyss Company	
