= XX (web series) =

2020 South Korean web series

- Promotional poster
- Hangul: 엑스엑스
- RR: Ekseuekseu
- MR: Eksŭeksŭ
- Genre: Romantic drama
- Created by: Ahn Joon-shik
- Written by: Lee Seul
- Directed by: Kim Joon-mo
- Starring: Ahn Hee-yeon; Hwang Seung-eon; Bae In-hyuk; Lee Jong-won
- Country of origin: South Korea
- Original language: Korean
- No. of episodes: 10 (V Live); 5 (MBC TV)

Production
- Producer: Park Tae-won
- Running time: 25 minutes (V Live); 50 minutes (MBC TV)
- Production companies: PlayList Global; MBC

Original release
- Network: V Live, MBC TV, Naver TV Cast, YouTube, Facebook
- Release: January 24 – February 21, 2020

XX (Korean: 엑스엑스) is a 2020 South Korean web drama series broadcast by V Live, MBC TV, Naver TV Cast, YouTube and Facebook. Directed by Kim Joon-mo, it stars Ahn Hee-yeon, Hwang Seung-eon, Bae In-hyuk and Lee Jong-won. It aired from January 24 to February 21, 2020.

== Synopsis ==
The story of Yoon Na-na, a bartender who works at the speakeasy bar XX.

== Cast ==
=== Main ===
- Ahn Hee-yeon as Yoon Na-na

A skilled and friendly bartender who has been saving money in hopes to buy the bar XX. She hasn't been in a relationship since her boyfriend cheated on her with her former best friend, Lee Roo-mi, five years ago.

- Hwang Seung-eon as Lee Roo-mi

A business woman who comes from a rich family. She used to be Na-na's best friend. Unable to scout the latter for the second bar she is about to open, she decides to buy XX and keep Na-na as her employee.

- Bae In-hyuk as Park Dan-hee

A former athlete who put an end to his career after an accident. He decided to become a bartender after seeing Na-na's passion for her job and has been her colleague for two years. He secretly loves her.

- Lee Jong-won as Wang Jeong-deun

Na-na's flatmate and best friend, he prefers to be called by his English name Jayden. He is always there to give Na-na's advice and comfort. He is a perfumer who owns a shop in Itaewon, Seoul.

=== Supporting ===
- Kim Joon-kyung as Jeong Gyu-min

Roo-mi's boyfriend. Because of his poor background, Roo-mi helped him with his tuition and living expenses. He now works at a large law firm and is suspected to be cheating on her with one of his colleagues.

- Na Eun-saem as Lim Jang-mi

A lawyer who works closely with Gyu-min and is suspected to be having an affair with him.

- Shin Jae-hwi as Seo Tae-hyun

Na-na's former boyfriend who cheated on her with Roo-mi. He is now the director of Revan Cosmetics.

- Choi Jung-woo as Jayden's ex

Jayden's ex-boyfriend.

=== Special appearances ===
- Steve Noh as a customer (Ep. 3)

== Original soundtrack ==
XX OST

Soundtrack album by Various artists
- Released: 2020
- Genre: Soundtrack
- Languages: Korean; English
- Labels: Vlending Co., Ltd.; PlayList Global

=== Part 1 ===
Released on February 6, 2020
No.	Title	Lyrics	Music	Artist	Length
1.	"Gotta Go" (가라고)	Sunmi	Sunmi; Frants	Sunmi	2:59
2.	"Gotta Go" (Inst.)		Sunmi; Frants		2:59
Total length:					5:58

=== Part 2 ===
Released on February 13, 2020
No.	Title	Lyrics	Music	Artist	Length
1.	"Fixx me"	Bummy.D	Bummy.D; Soundhood	Jukjae	4:12
2.	"Fixx me" (Inst.)		Bummy.D; Soundhood		4:12
Total length:					8:24

=== Part 3 ===
Released on February 20, 2020
No.	Title	Lyrics	Music	Artist	Length
1.	"Good Day To Love"	Bummy.D	Bummy.D	Wyne	4:14
2.	"Good Day To Love" (Slow Ver.)	Bummy.D	Bummy.D	Wyne	4:53
3.	"Good Day To Love" (Inst.)		Bummy.D		4:14
4.	"Good Day To Love" (Slow ver.) (Inst.)		Bummy.D		4:53
Total length:					18:14

=== Chart performance ===
Title	Year	Peak positions	Remarks	Ref.
Title	Year	KOR	Remarks	Ref.
"Gotta Go" (가라고) (Sunmi)	2020	123	Part 1	

== Ratings ==
In this table, the blue numbers represent the lowest ratings and the red numbers represent the highest ratings.

Ep.	MBC broadcast date	Title	Average audience share (AGB Nielsen)
1	January 24, 2020	My Boyfriend Who Ghosted Me Was With Another Girl All Along	1.5%
1	January 24, 2020	How Rich Kids Screw Ex-BFs	1.5%
2	January 31, 2020	How to Teach a Lesson to a Guy Having an Affair	1.9%
2	January 31, 2020	Love Someone Secretly Because You Love That Person So Much?	1.9%
3	February 7, 2020	How a Handsome And Young Guy Seduces Her	1.7%
3	February 7, 2020	When You Catch Your Friend's Boyfriend Cheating. Tell or Not Tell?	1.7%
4	February 14, 2020	The Way to Catch a Cheater Red-Handed	2.2%
4	February 14, 2020	How Girls Slash Assholes	2.2%
5	February 21, 2020	A Quiet Man Looks Sexy When He Gets Angry	1.4%
5	February 21, 2020	The Best Revenge On Your Ex-Boyfriend In Just 5 Minutes	1.4%
Average			1.7%

== Awards ==
Year	Award	Category	Winner	Result	Ref.
2020	15th Seoul International Drama Awards	Short Form Best Work Award	XX	Nominated	
2020	15th Seoul International Drama Awards	Jury's Special Prize	XX	Won	
2020	15th Seoul International Drama Awards	Male performer award	Bae In-hyuk	Nominated	
