= When We Disco =

2020 single by J. Y. Park and Sunmi

Single by J. Y. Park and Sunmi
- Language: Korean
- Released: August 12, 2020
- Recorded: 2020
- Genre: Euro disco
- Length: 3:44
- Label: JYP
- Songwriter: J. Y. Park

J. Y. Park singles chronology
"Fever" (2019)	"When We Disco" (2020)	"Switch to Me" (2020)

Sunmi singles chronology
"Pporappippam" (2020)	"When We Disco" (2020)	"Oh Yeah" (2020)

Music video
- "When We Disco" on YouTube

"When We Disco" is a song recorded by South Korean singer-songwriters J. Y. Park and Sunmi. Written and composed by Park, it was released as a digital single on August 12, 2020 by JYP Entertainment. The song was featured at "J.Y. Park Best" album, with a Japanese version as bonus track.

== Background and release ==
At a restaurant, after hearing a song that she used to listen to in New York with J. Y. Park when Wonder Girls were touring the United States with him, Sunmi sent a recording of the song to her former boss to reminisce about the past. J. Y. Park answered her message by sending her a demo of his song, asking her "if she missed the days [they] worked together" and suggesting a collaboration. At this point, he had almost completed writing the lyrics.

I said I’d work with him, thinking that I’d just be featuring in the song, but when I saw the lyrics, I had a whole verse. When I asked if it was a duet, he texted me saying yes with a smiley face. I asked him if he was thinking of anyone else for the song, and he responded, "No, there’s no one else but you."

— Sunmi

On July 24, 2020, it was reported that J. Y. Park would release a new song in August and that all recordings had been completed. On August 3, a teaser poster announcing Park and Sunmi's collaboration scheduled to be released on August 12 was posted on JYP Entertainment's twitter account and retweeted by both singers. On August 6, J. Y. Park shared a teaser for the music video on his Instagram account. A second teaser was released on YouTube the following day. On August 10, both singers shared the online cover image for the song. The single was released on August 12.

== Composition ==
Park was inspired by Modern Talking's song "Brother Louie" which serves as the opening song for the South Korean talk show Radio Star and was stuck in his head at the time; it took him a few hours to complete the song. Park said to have used "typical instruments of the European disco genre and recorded with the equipment imbued with 80s vibes to fully recreate nostalgic melody."

== Music video ==
The song's accompanying music video was released on August 11, 2020 at 6:00 PM (KST), one day prior to the single's release. It was inspired by the American films Saturday Night Fever (1977) and Pulp Fiction (1994) which J. Y. Park loves, as mentioned at the end of the video.

Riddhi Chakraborty of Rolling Stone India described the music video to have "a late-Seventies, early-Eighties vibe, reviving the Saturday Night Fever era with its multi-coloured dance floor, hazy club setting, glimmering disco ball and glitzy wardrobe and makeup. Park and Sunmi play lovers who are parted in their youth but are fated to meet again 10 years later, fighting gangsters and all odds to be together and celebrate their love for each other and for disco."

The music video reached 2.32 million views in 24 hours, a new record for J. Y. Park. It surpassed 10 million views 4 days and 22 hours after its release.

== Live performances ==
Park performed the song with Illit at the 2024 Weverse Con Festival, where he was invited as a "tribute artist" to celebrate the 30th anniversary of his debut.

== Critical reception ==
Jason Lipshutz of Billboard said that the song "showcases both J. Y. Park and Sunmi's vocal talents above sparkling synth lines."

== Chart performance ==
After its release, the single quickly topped the real-time music charts Naver Music, Genie Music and Bugs.

== Credits and personnel ==
Credits adapted from Genie Music. Recorded at JYPE Studio.

- J. Y. Park – lead vocals, songwriter, composer, arranger
- Sunmi – lead vocals
- Lee Hae-sol – arranger
- Ham Chun-ho – guitar
- Lee Tae-yoon – bass
- Kim Hyo-kook – keyboard
- Kim Hyo-soo – background vocals
- Lee Sang-yeob – recording
- Tony Maserati – mixing
- Chris Gehringer – mastering

== Charts ==
=== Weekly charts ===
Chart (2020)	Peak position
South Korea (Gaon Digital Chart)	3
South Korea (Kpop Hot 100)	2
US World Digital Song Sales (Billboard)	22

=== Monthly chart ===
Chart (2020)	Peak position
South Korea (Circle Digital Chart)	5

=== Year-end chart ===
Chart (2020)	Position
South Korea (Circle Digital Chart)	55

== Certifications ==
Certifications for "When We Disco"
Region	Certification	Certified units/sales
Streaming
South Korea (KMCA)	Platinum	100,000,000^{†}
^{†} Streaming-only figures based on certification alone.

== Accolades ==
Awards for "When We Disco"
Year	Organization	Award	Result	Ref.
2020	Mnet Asian Music Awards	Best Collaboration	Nominated	
2020	Mnet Asian Music Awards	Song of the Year	Nominated	

== Release history ==
Country	Date	Format	Label	Ref.
Various	August 12, 2020	Digital download; streaming	JYP Entertainment	
