= Lalalay =

2019 single by Sunmi

Single by Sunmi
- Language: Korean
- Released: August 27, 2019
- Recorded: 2019
- Genre: Electro-pop
- Length: 2:54
- Label: Makeus
- Songwriter: Sunmi
- Producers: Sunmi; Frants

Sunmi singles chronology
"Noir" (2019)	"Lalalay" (2019)	"Gotta Go" (2020)

Music video
- "Lalalay" on YouTube

"Lalalay" (Korean: 날라리; RR: Nallali; lit. '"Bully"', stylized in all caps) is a song recorded by South Korean singer Sunmi, released on August 27, 2019, by Makeus Entertainment as a single. Sunmi wrote and co-produced the song with Frants.

== Background and composition ==
The song was announced and confirmed by Sunmi on August 17, 2019, through a promotional poster on various social media accounts. "Lalalay" runs for two minutes and fifty-four seconds. It was written by Sunmi and produced by her and Frants. Tamar Herman of Billboard describes the song as a "Latin pop and dancehall elements with traditional Korean sounds, incorporating the traditional Korean horn instrument known as a taepyeongso."

== Music video ==
The music video was directed by Choi Yongseok (Lumpens). It was uploaded on 1theK's channel and Sunmi's official channel on August 27, 2019. As of April 2021, the video has over 33 million views combined on both channels.

== Credits and personnel ==
Credits adapted from Tidal.

- Sunmi – vocals, songwriting, composition
- Frants – composition, production

== Accolades ==
Year-end lists
Critic/Publication	List	Rank	Ref.
BuzzFeed	Best K-pop Music Videos of 2019	22	

=== Awards and nominations ===
Year	Award	Category	Result	Ref.
2019	21st Mnet Asian Music Awards	Best Dance Performance	Nominated	
2019	21st Mnet Asian Music Awards	Song of the Year	Nominated	
2020	9th Gaon Chart Music Awards	Song of the Year – August	Won	
2020	29th Seoul Music Awards	Dance Performance Award	Nominated	

== Charts ==
Chart (2019)	Peak position
Finland Digital Song Sales (Billboard)	9
Singapore (RIAS)	22
South Korea (Gaon)	8
South Korea (Kpop Hot 100)	1
US World Digital Song Sales (Billboard)	4

== Release history ==
Country	Date	Format	Label	Ref.
Various	August 27, 2019	Digital download; streaming	Makeus Entertainment	

== See also ==
- List of Kpop Hot 100 number ones
