= Pporappippam =

2020 single by Sunmi

Single by Sunmi
- Language: Korean and English
- Released: June 29, 2020
- Genre: Dance-pop; Nu-disco
- Length: 3:27
- Label: Makeus
- Songwriter: Sunmi
- Producers: Sunmi; Frants

Sunmi singles chronology
"Gotta Go" (2020)	"Pporappippam" (2020)	"When We Disco" (2020)

Music video
- "pporappippam" on YouTube

Professional ratings
Review scores
Source	Rating
IZM	3.5/5 stars

"Pporappippam" (Korean: 보라빛 밤; RR: Borabit Bam; lit. '"Purple-hued Night"'; stylized in all lowercase) is a song recorded by South Korean singer Sunmi, released on June 29, 2020, by Makeus Entertainment as a single. Sunmi wrote and co-produced the song with Frants. The music video was released on the same day.

== Background ==
On May 21, 2020, it was revealed that Sunmi would be making a comeback in late June or early July.

Sunmi revealed that she was originally working on another song but "because these days people feel down and heavy-hearted, [she] wanted to make something that could help them feel refreshed rather than something deep." The song title, which is a romanization of the Korean words for purple-hued night, was chosen because "the violet-colored sky made her feel an undefinable sense of love and joy, but also because she thought that the color purple best described her."

== Composition ==
The song, which was co-composed by Sunmi and Frants, incorporates dance-pop and city pop sounds and features rhythmic beats and guitar riffs by singer-songwriter Jukjae. Sunmi mentioned during a press event that she "added the flute sound to the intro and hook" in order "to keep [her] own color." When describing the song, she said that "wanted to sonically express those feelings [which] gives you butterflies in your stomach [when] a breeze cools you down on a summer day at sunset after a hot day and you are looking up to the sky at a café terrace."

Rolling Stone India describes the song as "a fun Eighties-synth heavy pop track that falls neatly into the singer-songwriter's signature style that blends nostalgia with modern pop culture to a strangely haunting effect."

== Music video ==
The music video was released on 1theK's and Sunmi's YouTube channels on June 29, 2020 at 5:30 PM (KST), thirty minutes prior to the single's release. It was directed by Ziyong Kim of FantazyLab, styled by stylist Kevin Germanier, and the choreography was completed by dancer Lee Yi-jung.

Yonhap describes the music video as being "saturated in a purple hue filled with imagery of young partiers having a blast around a beach bonfire with fireworks, without the usual biting commentaries associated with Sunmi." Sunmi herself talks about the song as her "first true love song [since] her music largely carried cynicism or ridicule of love."

== Chart performance ==
"Pporappippam" debuted in the top eight of realtime music charts Bugs, Genie and Melon. Recording 341,409 streams on Spotify on the day of its release, the song marks Sunmi's best debut on the streaming platform. The song topped the iTunes Chart in Malta, Saudi Arabia, Sweden, Qatar, Finland and Mongolia. It debuted at number 5 on Billboard World Digital Songs Chart, making Sunmi the only South Korean female soloist with six songs peaking within the top five. It also debuted at number 5 on the Gaon Digital Chart, making it her eighth consecutive top 10 single on the chart.

== Credits and personnel ==
Credits adapted from Melon.

- Sunmi – vocals, songwriting, composing, chorus, producing
- Frants – composing, computer programming, drum, percussion, bass, keyboard, synth, digital editing
- Jukjae – guitar
- Mr. Sync – recording
- Jo Jung-hyun – recording
- El Capitxn – digital editing
- Gu Jong-pil – mixing
- Chris Gehringer – mastering

== Charts ==
=== Weekly charts ===
Chart (2020)	Peak position
Singapore (RIAS)	15
South Korea (Gaon Digital Chart)	5
South Korea (Kpop Hot 100)	4
US World Digital Song Sales (Billboard)	5

=== Monthly charts ===
Chart (July 2020)	Peak position
South Korea (Circle Digital Chart)	7

=== Year-end charts ===
Chart (2020)	Position
South Korea (Circle Digital Chart)	61

== Accolades ==
Awards for "Pporappippam"
Year	Organization	Award	Result	Ref.
2020	Mnet Asian Music Awards	Best Dance Performance – Solo	Nominated	

== Release history ==
Country	Date	Format	Label	Ref.
Various	June 29, 2020	Digital download; streaming	Makeus Entertainment	
