= Gotta Go (Sunmi song) =

2020 song by Sunmi

Single by Sunmi

from the album XX (Original Television Soundtrack) Pt. 1
- Released: February 6, 2020
- Genre: Rock; Hip hop; Trap
- Length: 2:59
- Label: Vlending Co., Ltd.PlayList Global
- Songwriter: Sunmi
- Producers: Sunmi; Frants

Sunmi singles chronology
"Lalalay" (2019)	"Gotta Go" (2020)	"Pporappippam" (2020)

Music video
- "Gotta Go" on YouTube

Performance video
- "Gotta Go" on YouTube

"Gotta Go" (Korean: 가라고; RR: Garago) is a song recorded by South Korean singer Sunmi for the soundtrack of the web series XX. It was released as a digital single on February 6, 2020 by Vlending Co., Ltd. and PlayList Global.

== Background ==
On November 22, 2019, it was reported that Sunmi would participate in the soundtrack of the web series XX. The first teaser of the series, released on January 9, 2020 and in which Sunmi made a cameo appearance, featured the song as background music.

== Composition ==
Sunmi co-composed the track with her frequent collaborator Frants. Compared to most Korean drama soundtracks which "tend to be ballad or acoustic-leaning," Sunmi's "Gotta Go" is "based on the theme of the drama or specific scene for which its [sic] used." "Gotta Go" is a hip hop song encompassing diverse genres such as rock and trap.

== Track listing ==
- Digital download

No.	Title	Lyrics	Music	Length
1.	"Gotta Go" (가라고)	Sunmi	Sunmi; Frants	2:59
2.	"Gotta Go" (Inst.)		Sunmi; Frants	2:59
Total length:				5:58

== Music video ==
A music video for the song was released on February 2, 2020 at noon, six hours before the single's release. It features scenes from XX, showing how the friendship between Yoon Na-na (Ahn Hee-yeon) and Lee Roo-mi (Hwang Seung-eon) broke when they were university students.

== Performance video ==
A dance performance video directed by NOVVKIM was released on February 8, 2020.

== Commercial performance ==
The song debuted at number 130 on South Korea's Gaon Digital Chart during the week of February 2–8, 2020 before peaking at 123 the following week. It also debuted at number 81 on the Billboard K-Pop Hot 100 chart and peaked at number 65; it spent three weeks on the chart. On the week of February 22, 2020, "Gotta Go" debuted at number 17 on the US Billboard World Digital Songs Chart before dropping out of the chart the following week.

== Credits and personnel ==
Credits adapted from Melon.

- Sunmi – vocals, songwriter, composer, chorus
- Frants – composer, arranger, programming, drum, percussion, bass, keyboard, synth
- Heo Eun-sook – recording, digital editing
- Gu Jong-pil – mixing
- Randy Merrill – mastering

== Charts ==
Chart (2020)	Peak position
South Korea (Gaon Digital Chart)	123
South Korea (Kpop Hot 100)	65
US World Digital Songs (Billboard)	17

== Release history ==
Country	Date	Format	Label	Ref.
Various	February 6, 2020	Digital download; streaming	Vlending Co., Ltd. and PlayList Global	
