= The Wonder Begins =

Single album by Wonder Girls
- Released: February 13, 2007
- Genre: K-pop; hip hop; R&B
- Length: 13:12
- Label: JYP Entertainment
- Producer: Park Jin-young

Wonder Girls chronology
The Wonder Begins (2007)	The Wonder Years (2007)

Singles from The Wonder Begins
- 1. "Irony" Released: February 13, 2007

The Wonder Begins is the debut single album by South Korean girl group Wonder Girls, released on February 13, 2007, through JYP Entertainment. It contains the main track "Irony", written and produced by Park Jin-young. The release also contains three additional tracks: "Bad Boy", "It's Not Love", and a remix of "Irony". An accompanying music video for "Irony" features members Sohee, Yeeun, Sunmi and Hyuna getting revenge on Sunye's unfaithful boyfriend by using a voodoo doll to embarrass him. The Wonder Begins is the group's only release that was promoted with member Hyuna, who left the group in July 2007.

== Irony ==
=== Versions ===
"Irony" was pre-released on Melon on February 6, 2007. The original studio version featuring the original line-up (Min Sunye, Park Yeeun, Lee Sunmi, Kim Hyuna and Ahn Sohee) is available on The Wonder Begins and on their debut studio album The Wonder Years. The song was later re-recorded for the Japanese release of their greatest hits album Wonder Best and features the line-up consisting of Min Sunye, Park Yeeun, Ahn Sohee, Kim Yubin and Woo Hyerim, with the vocals of the former members removed.

=== Music video ===
A music video was produced for "Irony" to promote The Wonder Begins. The video begins by showing the group members casually hanging out at a house, when Sunye enters in a depressed state. Her groupmates sit around her and Sunye tells them about her cheating boyfriend. Sunmi locates him through their computer, Sohee activates a satellite dish for remote surveillance, and Hyuna uses a voodoo doll to embarrass him in front of his new girlfriend. The girls later enter a club where he is with his friends. Sunye blows him away, causing a gust of wind, and he falls down a wall. The video ends with the girls laughing at him and walking away.

== Critical reception ==
The Wonder Begins received generally mixed reviews from music critics. Jeong Seong-ha, Han Dong-yoon, Yoon Jee-hoon of Korean web magazine IZM gave "Irony" unfavorable reviews, who felt that the song lacked innovation, comparing the song to works of older artists such as g.o.d and Rain. YesAsia wrote a positive review of the single album, describing "Irony" as a "catchy, up-tempo hip hop number" and "Bad Boy" as an "innovative electronic R&B song". They concluded that, "The Wonder Begins marks a very promising start for K-pop's newest sensation." In a retrospective review, Billboard wrote that "'Irony' is pretty dated with its R&B-pop styling and redundant beat, but the sleek, hook-filled chorus was filled with promise."

== Track listing ==
All tracks are written by Park Jin-young.

The Wonder Begins
No.	Title	Producer(s)	Length
1.	"Irony"	Park Jin-young	4:04
2.	"Bad Boy"	Park Jin-young; Hitman Bang	3:11
3.	"It's Not Love" (미안한 마음; Mianhan Maeum)	Park Jin-young; SoulAttack	4:00
4.	"Irony" (Tae Kwon – "Daybreak" remix)	Park Jin-young	3:57
Total length:			13:12

== Charts ==
The chart positions are based on data from Music Industry Association Korea. Unlike Oricon and Billboard, the charts are released monthly, not weekly.

=== Monthly charts ===
Chart (2007)	Peak position
South Korean Albums (MIAK)	17

=== Yearly charts ===
Chart (2007)	Position
South Korean Albums (MIAK)	72

== Sales ==
Country	Sales amount
South Korea	15,000
