= Me? =

EP by Ha:tfelt
- Released: July 31, 2014
- Recorded: 2014
- Genre: Pop
- Length: 27:43
- Language: Korean
- Label: JYP

Ha:tfelt chronology
Me? (2014)	Meine (2017)

Singles from Me?
- 1. "Ain't Nobody" Released: July 31, 2014

Me? is the debut extended play by South Korean singer Park Ye-eun under her stage name "Ha:tfelt" (핫펠트 "heartfelt"), released on July 31, 2014 by JYP Entertainment. The lead single, "Ain't Nobody", was used to promote the album. The album was included in Billboard's list of the 10 best K-pop albums of 2014.

== History ==
Ha:tfelt held her debut stage performance on July 31, 2014 on Mnet's M Countdown. The song was also performed on Music Bank, Show! Music Core and Inkigayo.

== Reception ==
Jeff Benjamin, writing for Billboard, was very positive about the album, praising the singer for her vocals (which he compared to Sia's) and for "singing, co-composing and co-writing" the entire album, "taking risks with her music and image".

== Track listing ==
No.	Title	Lyrics	Music	Length
1.	"Iron Girl" (featuring Lim of Wonder Girls)	Park Ye-eun, Lee Woo-min "Collapsedone", Woo Hye-lim, Sool J	Park, Lee	3:36
2.	"Truth"	Park, Lee	Park, Lee	3:45
3.	"Ain't Nobody"	Park, Lee	Park, Lee	3:43
4.	"Bond" (featuring Beenzino)	Park, Lee, Beenzino	Park, Lee	3:21
5.	"Wherever Together"	Park, Lee	Park, Lee	4:40
6.	"Peter Pan"	Park, Lee	Park, Lee	4:24
7.	"Nothing Lasts Forever" (다운)	Park, Lee	Park, Lee	4:14
Total length:				27:43

== Charts ==
=== Album charts ===
Chart	Peak position
South Korea Gaon Weekly Albums Chart	6
South Korea Gaon Monthly Albums Chart	33
South Korea Gaon Yearly Albums Chart	

=== Sales ===
Chart	Sales
Gaon physical sales	4,878
Hanteo physical sales	2,600

=== Single charts ===
Song	Peak position
Song	Gaon Chart
"Ain't Nobody"	16
"Iron Girl"	62
"Bond"	92

== Release history ==
Region	Format	Date	Label	Edition	Catalog
Worldwide	Digital download	July 31, 2014	JYP Entertainment	Regular	
South Korea	CD	July 31, 2014	JYP Entertainment, KT Music	Regular	JYPK0412
