= Draw Me =

Single by Wonder Girls
- Released: February 10, 2017
- Genre: K-pop
- Length: 3:49
- Label: JYP Entertainment; KT Music
- Songwriter(s): Yeeun; Yubin
- Producer(s): Hong Jisang

Wonder Girls singles chronology
"Why So Lonely" (2016)	"Draw Me" (2017)

"Draw Me" (Korean: 그려줘; RR: geulyeojwo) is a song recorded by South Korean girl group Wonder Girls. It was released as a digital single by JYP Entertainment and distributed by KT Music on February 10, 2017. The lyrics were written by Yeeun and Yubin and the music was composed by them and Hong Jisang. The song was released as the final single from the group, as a commemoration of their 10th anniversary since debut.

The song was a moderate success, peaking at number 32 on the Gaon Digital Chart. The song has sold 81,619 downloads as of February 2017.

== Background and release ==
On January 26, 2017, it was officially announced by JYP Entertainment that the group will be disbanding. It was also revealed that as a thank you to the fans, "the group will be releasing a final digital single on February 10, their 10th anniversary" with no further details. On February 8, the cover art and title for the final single was revealed. It was set to be released on February 10 at midnight KST, to coincide with their 10th anniversary.

"Draw Me" was released as a digital single on February 10, 2017 through several music sites in South Korea and on iTunes for the global market.

== Chart performance ==
"Draw Me" debuted and peaked at number 32 on the Gaon Digital Chart on the chart issue dated February 5–11, 2017, with 45,674 downloads sold and 907,635 streams. In its second week, the song fell to number 52, with 26,311 downloads sold and 1,112,270 streams.

The song entered at number 82 on the Gaon Digital Chart for the month of February 2017, with 81,619 downloads sold.

== Track listing ==
Digital download
No.	Title	Lyrics	Producer	Length
1.	"Draw Me" (그려줘; geulyeojwo)	Yeeun; Yubin; Hong Jisang	Hong	3:49

== Charts ==
=== Weekly charts ===
Chart (2017)	Peak position
South Korea (Gaon Digital Chart)	32

=== Monthly charts ===
Chart (2017)	Peak position
South Korea (Gaon Digital Chart)	82

== Release history ==
Region	Date	Format	Label
South Korea	February 10, 2017	Digital download	JYP Entertainment, KT Music
Various	February 10, 2017	Digital download	JYP Entertainment
