= Woo Hye-rim =

South Korean singer (born 1992)

- 우혜림
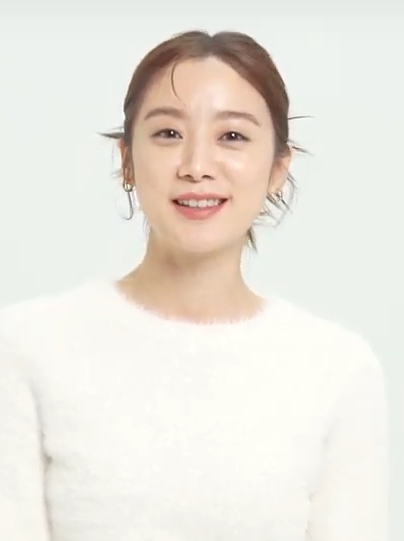
- Woo in May 2023
- Born: Woo Hye-rim; September 1, 1992 (age 34); Seoul, South Korea
- Other names: Christina Woo; Lim
- Occupations: Singer; rapper; songwriter
- Spouse: Shin Min-chul (m. 2020)
- Children: 2
- Musical career
- Genre: K-pop
- Instruments: Vocals; guitar; piano
- Years active: 2010–present
- Labels: JYP; RRR
- Formerly of: Wonder Girls; JYP Nation
- Website: waveseoul.com/en/artists/hyerim-woo/

Korean name
- Hangul: 우혜림
- Hanja: 禹惠林
- RR: U Hyerim
- MR: U Hyerim

Woo Hye-rim (Korean: 우혜림; born September 1, 1992), known professionally as Hyerim or Lim, is a South Korean singer, rapper, songwriter, and radio personality known for her work as a former member of South Korean girl group Wonder Girls. She has hosted Wonder Hours with Hyerim on KBS World Radio since January 2024.

== Early life ==
Woo Hye-rim was born on September 1, 1992, in Seoul, South Korea. She lived in Hong Kong for 14 years, where she finished middle school before returning to South Korea. She can speak Korean, English, Cantonese, and Mandarin fluently. Her father is a grandmaster and promoter of Taekwondo, with the highest 9th-degree black belt in the discipline.

== Career ==
=== Pre-debut ===
Originally, Hyerim was a part of five-member group in training in 2009. While still in training, the group flew to China where they appeared in numerous variety shows performing dance routines and songs to showcase their talent to the Chinese audience. As the group had no official name they were widely known to the Chinese audiences as "JYP Sisters" or simply as "Sisters" and were also dubbed by JYPE as the "Chinese Wonder Girls". However, before the group could officially debut, two of their members withdrew leaving only three which included Lim herself as well as Jia and Fei, who both went onto become members of Miss A. Hyerim later confirmed that she originally prepared debut as a member of Miss A for three-years and two months prior the group's debut, she was added as new member of Wonder Girls in January 2010.

=== Wonder Girls and other activities ===
On January 22, 2010, Hyerim was revealed as new member of Wonder Girls, after member Sunmi put her musical career on hiatus to focus on studies. Her official debut stage with the group was on February 5, 2010, in a performance in Shanghai.

In 2013, she became a co-host for EBS radio broadcast English Go Go!. From August 20, 2013 to March 10, 2014, she also served as the host of Arirang TV's Pops in Seoul.

On June 24, 2015, it was announced that Wonder Girls would be making comeback after two-year hiatus, as a four-member band. On the band's August 2015 release REBOOT, she contributed to the writing and production of three songs.

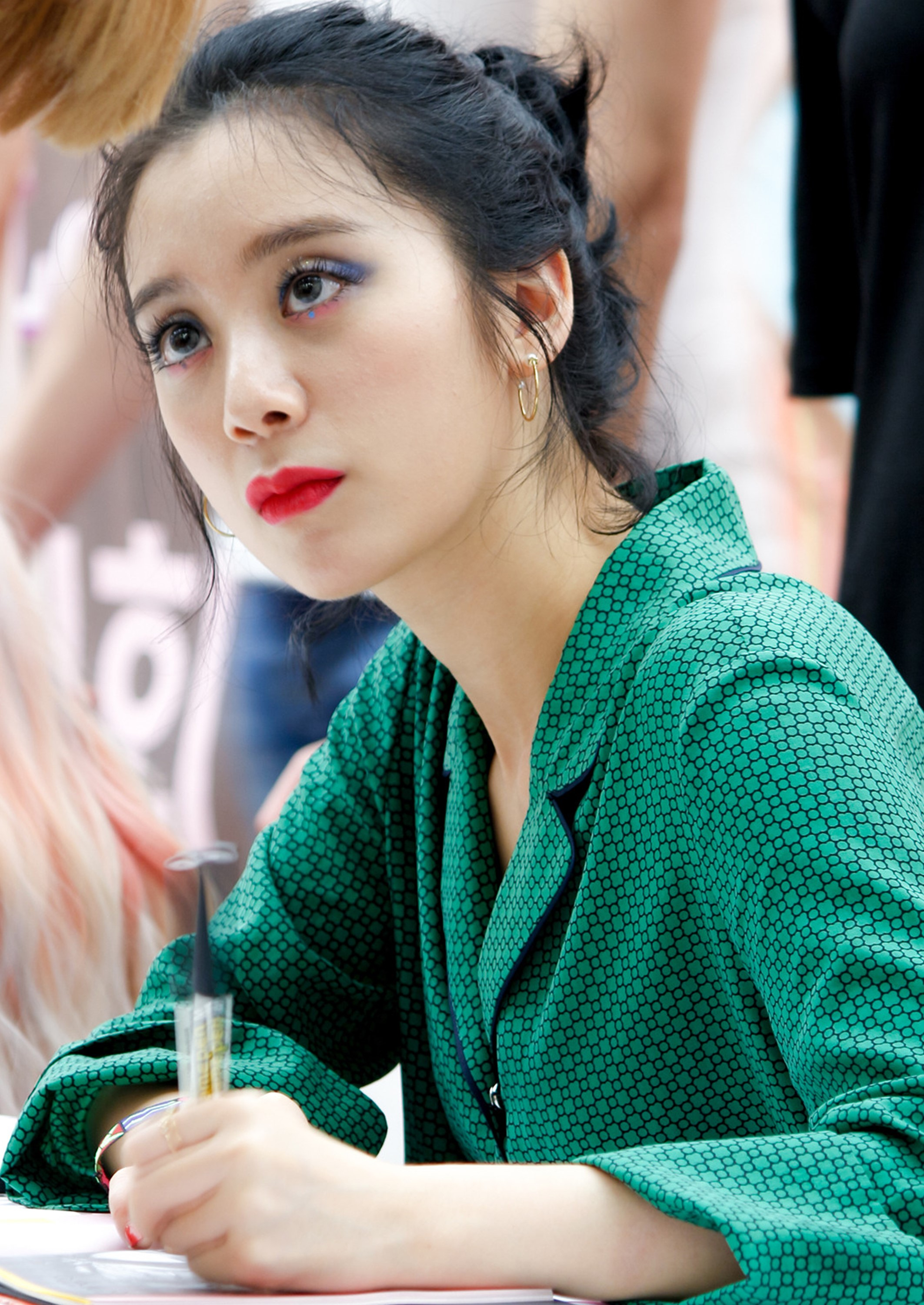
Woo at a fansigning event in 2016

Hyerim released a collaboration single with Bernard Park titled "With You" on April 3, 2016, as a part of JYP Entertainment's JYP Duet Match project. In July of the same year, she also contributed to the composition of two songs on Wonder Girls' single EP Why So Lonely.

On January 26, 2017, it was announced that Wonder Girls were to disband after unsuccessful contract renewal negotiation with some of its members. Hyerim was one of the members who renewed her contract with JYP Entertainment. The group released their final single "Draw Me" on February 10; it also serves as a celebration for their 10th anniversary since debut.

Hyerim left JYP Entertainment on January 25, 2020, and her departure from the label was announced three days later.

On March 10, 2020, Hyerim signed with RRR Entertainment, a new agency founded by fellow Wonder Girls member Yubin since she left JYP Entertainment. In February 2023, the agency announced that Hyerim has decided not to renew the contract.

In January 2024, Hyerim signed contract with Wave Entertainment. On January 29, she began hosting the daily radio show Wonder Hours with Hyerim on KBS World Radio, which serves as the follow-up to One Fine Day with Lena Park.

== Personal life ==
In 2017, Hyerim began majoring in Interpretation in Hankuk University of Foreign Studies, under the school's Department of English for International Conferences and Communication (EICC). She was accepted into the program in December 2016 and received a scholarship in her first semester. In February 2018, she was honored with a certificate from the Ministry of Foreign Affairs for creating a voluntary video on safety in traveling overseas. She helped translate The Diary of a Young Girl by Anne Frank from English to Korean for its publication in South Korea. Woo graduated from Hankuk in 2021.

Hyerim began dating taekwondo athlete Shin Min-chul in 2013. They were confirmed to be engaged in May 2020 and got married on July 5.

On October 8, 2021, Hyerim announced she was expecting her first child with Shin. On February 25, 2022, Hyerim's agency confirmed that she gave birth to her first son on February 23, 2022. On June 25, 2024, Hyerim announced that she was expecting her second child with Shin. Their second son was born on December 11, 2024.

== Discography ==
=== Singles ===
Title	Year	Album
As lead artist
"Act Cool" (feat. San E)	2011	Wonder World
Collaborations
"With You" (with Bernard Park)	2016	Non album-single
"Encore" (with Yubin, Yeeun, Min, Nichkhun, Junho, Mark, Jackson, Yugyeom, Nayeon, Jeongyeon, Momo and Mina as JYP Nation)	2016	Non album-single
As featured artist
"Cry of Love" (3rd Wave Music feat. Hyerim)	2013	Soldiers of Light
"Iron Girl" (Ha:tfelt feat. Hyerim)	2014	Me?

=== Songwriting and composing credits ===
Year	Album	Artist	Song	Lyrics		Music	
Year	Album	Artist	Song	Credited	With	Credited	With
2011	Wonder World	Wonder Girls	"Act Cool"	Yes	San E	Yes	San E
2014	Me?	Ha:tfelt	"Iron Girl"	Yes	Park Ye-eun and Lee Woo-min "Collapsedone"	Yes	Park Ye-eun and Lee Woo-min "Collapsedone"
2015	Reboot	Wonder Girls	"Candle"	Yes	Frants and Paloalto	Yes	Frants
2015	Reboot	Wonder Girls	"Back"	Yes	Kim Yu-bin and Lee Sun-mi	Yes	Kim Yu-bin and Lee Sun-mi
2015	Reboot	Wonder Girls	"Oppa" (오빠)	Yes	Frants	Yes	Frants
2016	JYP Duet Match Project	Bernard Park x Hyerim	"With You"	Yes	-	Yes	-
2016	Why So Lonely	Wonder Girls	"Why So Lonely"	Yes	Woo Hye-rim, Kim Yu-bin and Hong Ji-sang	Yes	Woo Hye-rim, Kim Yu-bin and Hong Ji-sang
2017	Twicetagram; Merry & Happy	Twice	"Look at Me" (날 바라바라봐)	Yes	Woo Hye-rim, Frants	Yes	Woo Hye-rim, Frants

== Filmography ==
=== Film ===
Year	Title	Role	Notes	Ref.
2010	The Last Godfather	Wonder Girls	Cameo	
2012	The Wonder Girls	Herself		
2014	Bad Sister	Park Jae-hee		
2023	Hong Kong Inside Me			

=== Television shows ===
Year	Title	Role	Notes	Ref.
2013–2014	Pops in Seoul	Host		
2017	K-RUSH	Host		
2018	Hello, Stranger!	Lead		
2020	King of Mask Singer	Contestant	as "Lobster" (episode 249)	
2021	China Stock	Host		
2022	Godfather	Cast Member		
2022	My: Humanities that Open Work	Regular panelist		

=== Hosting ===
Year	Title	Notes	Ref.
2021	ASEAN-Korea Cultural Innovation Forum		

== Ambassadorship ==
- Publicity Ambassador for Gachibom Film Festival (2021)
