= Why So Lonely =

Single by Wonder Girls
- B-side: "Beautiful Boy"; "Sweet & Easy"
- Released: July 5, 2016
- Recorded: 2016
- Genre: K-pop; reggae; dance
- Length: 3:26
- Label: JYP; KT Music
- Songwriters: Hyerim; Sunmi; Yubin; Hong Ji-sang

Wonder Girls singles chronology
"I Feel You" (2015)	"Why So Lonely" (2016)	"Draw Me" (2017)

Music video
- "Why So Lonely" on YouTube

"Why So Lonely" is a song by South Korean girl group Wonder Girls. It was released via JYP Entertainment on July 5, 2016, and was distributed by KT Music. The song was written by group members Hyerim, Sunmi, and Yubin, along with songwriter Hong Ji-sang who also handled the track's production. Musically, "Why So Lonely" is a reggae-pop dance track that lyrically depicts the "lonely feeling after a romantic relationship". The recording was distributed as a standard CD and was made available to digital outlets. The single album includes the two B-side tracks "Beautiful Boy" and "Sweet & Easy"; the former track was released on a limited edition vinyl at the 6th Seoul Record & CD Fair a month prior.

Upon release, the song received positive reviews from music critics, who praised the group's successful venture into reggae, and was awarded Best Pop Song at the 14th Korean Music Awards. Commercially, "Why So Lonely" saw success in South Korea—the digital song topped the Gaon Digital Chart while the CD single charted at number three on the Gaon Album Chart. The music video for "Why So Lonely" was posted to JYP's YouTube channel and was directed by Lumpens. To promote the single, Wonder Girls performed the song on various South Korean music programs, winning awards on The Show, M! Countdown, Inkigayo, and Music Bank.

== Background and composition ==
"Why So Lonely" was written by Wonder Girls members Hyerim, Sunmi, and Yubin, with songwriter Hong Ji-sang. It is the first Wonder Girls single not written by JYP Entertainment producer Park Jin-young, and marks their tenth anniversary as a group. After the release of the group's album Reboot in 2015, Park told them they were ready to write their own single. Yeeun said they tried to write a song that can "really benefit from being played live as a band", because their previous release did not meet their expectations. Unlike Reboot, which had hired instrumentalists, the members actually played their instruments on the tracks, completing their transition from a dance-oriented girl group to a real band.

"Why So Lonely" was described as a slow tempo, reggae-pop dance song with "soft guitar riffs and steel drum rhythm". The reggae genre was chosen after the members voted on various options, and they were also influenced by British singer Lily Allen. Hyerim said the lyrics "are about the lonely feeling after a romantic relationship, material that many people can sympathize with". The original chorus had a modern rock feel before Park advised the group to make it more reggae like the verses. "Beautiful Boy" was written by Sunmi, Yubin, and Hyerim, with songwriter Frants, who also co-wrote three songs on Reboot. It is an uptempo track featuring digital and analog sounds, and is inspired by 1970s music.

== Release ==
JYP Entertainment released teaser pictures of each member on the company's Twitter account in June 2016, showing the members venturing off to a 1970s concept. "Beautiful Boy" was released exclusively on limited edition vinyl at the 6th Seoul Record & CD Fair on June 18, selling all 500 available copies in less than two hours. One day before the single album's release, the track list was revealed, showing that the members had written and composed each track, including the title track. On July 4, Wonder Girls had a live premiere on Naver's V app at 11:30 pm KST, thirty minutes before the single was released at midnight on July 5. It was distributed as a physical single album and was made available for digital consumption. During the live broadcast, they performed all three songs from the release with the members playing their respective instruments.

== Reception ==
"Why So Lonely" received positive reviews from music critics. Idolator's Mike Wass said the single's reggae sound was a "major sound overhaul" and worked to "surprisingly great effect". He also said the song "shouldn't work at all, but it's actually one of the group's catchiest efforts to date". Jeff Benjamin of Fuse noted the song's 1970s-inspired rock band concept and reggae-rock sound, and said "the surging guitar riffs mixed with Wailers- and Sublime-like ska beats give the track a classic-rock vibe that the ladies successfully pull off". Hwang Sun-up of online magazine IZM gave the song 3.5/5. Billboard named "Why So Lonely" the second best K-Pop song of 2016, calling the band "throwback queens" and stating they were able to conquer "another musical era" while "touching listeners' emotions." Taylor Glasby of Dazed named the track the fourth best K-pop song of 2016. Upon receiving the award for Best Pop Song at the 14th Korean Music Awards, selection committee member Choi Ji-ho wrote: "its an outstanding song", it "draws the popular charm while preserving the genre's unique style without compromise."

"Why So Lonely" experienced commercial success in South Korea, the song became their first in five years to top the Gaon Digital Chart, selling 271,333 digital units in its first week of release. "Beautiful Boy" and "Sweet & Easy" also charted at numbers 30 and 41, respectively. The CD single charted at number three on the Gaon Album Chart, and sold 13,240 physical copies. By the end of the year, "Why So Lonely" garnered nearly 1,124,000 units in digital sales and was ranked as the 26th best-selling song in the country during 2016. Factoring together streams and ringtone downloads, it was the 22nd best-performing song overall on the year-end Gaon Digital Chart. In the United States, "Why So Lonely" charted at number five on the Billboard World Digital Song Sales chart, while "Beautiful Boy" peaked at number 16 and "Sweet & Easy" was number 17.

== Music video and promotion ==
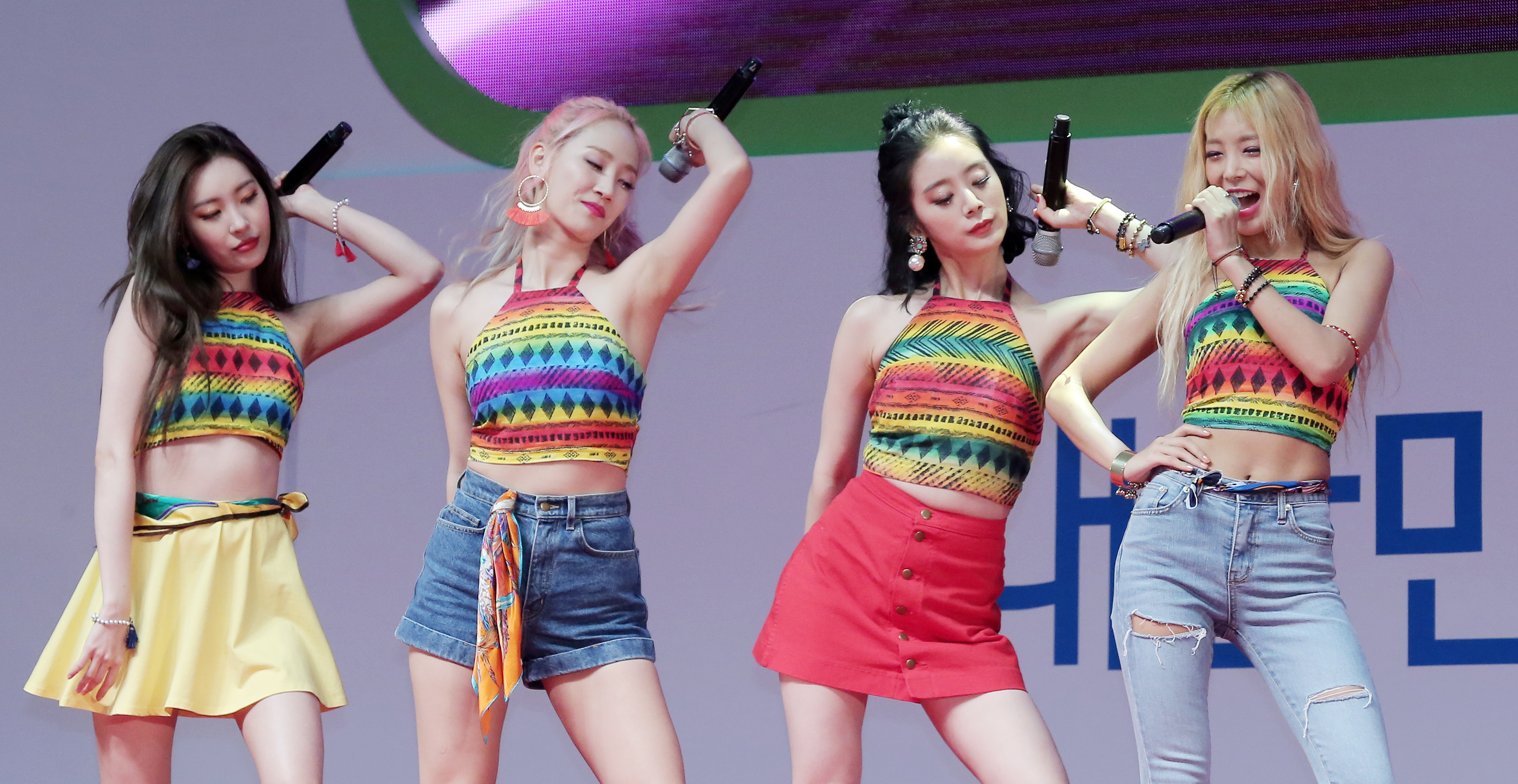
Wonder Girls performing at the launch ceremony for the South Korean Olympic team on July 19, 2016

The single was promoted with a series of televised live performances on South Korean music programs, starting with Mnet's M! Countdown on July 7. Before the single's release, KBS had banned "Sweet & Easy" from broadcast because the lyrics mention a brand name, considered "inappropriate for the national telecast". On July 12, Wonder Girls performed the dance version of "Why So Lonely" for the first time on SBS MTV's The Show, winning the trophy for that week. This was their first win on a music program since the release of "Like This" in 2012. They subsequently won awards on M! Countdown and Inkigayo. The group performed the song at the launch ceremony for the South Korean Olympic team on July 19. On August 5, they won a fourth music show award on Music Bank, even though they had finished promotions for the song and did not perform.

== Awards and nominations ==
Awards and nominations for "Why So Lonely"
Year	Organization	Award	Result	Ref.
2016	Melon Music Awards	Song of the Year	Nominated	
2016	Melon Music Awards	Best Dance Performance – Female	Nominated	
2016	Mnet Asian Music Awards	Best Music Video	Nominated	
2017	Gaon Chart Music Awards	Song of the Year – July	Won	
2017	Korean Music Awards	Song of the Year	Nominated	
2017	Korean Music Awards	Best Pop Song	Won	

Music program awards for "Why So Lonely"
Program	Date	Ref.
The Show	July 12, 2016	
M Countdown	July 14, 2016	
Inkigayo	July 17, 2016	
Music Bank	August 5, 2016	

== Track listing ==
CD/digital download
No.	Title	Writer(s)	Producer(s)	Length
1.	"Why So Lonely"	Hyerim; Sunmi; Yubin; Hong Ji-sang	Hong Ji-sang	3:26
2.	"Beautiful Boy" (아름다운 그대에게 (Note: Korean: 아름다운 그대에게; RR: Areumdaun geudaeege; lit. '"To the beautiful you"'))	Sunmi; Yubin; Hyerim; Frants	Frants	3:11
3.	"Sweet & Easy"	Yeeun; Yubin; Hong Ji-sang	Hong Ji-sang	3:21
Total length:				9:58

== Credits ==
Credits adapted from Melon.

Personnel

- Yubin – vocals, drums, lyricist, composer
- Sunmi – vocals, bass guitar, lyricist, composer
- Hyerim – vocals, guitar, lyricist, composer
- Yeeun – vocals, keyboard, lyricist, composer
- Hong Ji-sang – lyricist, composer, arranger
- Frants – lyricist, composer, arranger

== Charts ==
=== Weekly charts ===
Chart (2016)	Peak position
South Korea (Gaon Digital Chart)	1
South Korea (Gaon Album Chart)	3
US World Digital Song Sales (Billboard)	5

=== Monthly charts ===
Chart (July 2016)	Peak position
South Korea (Gaon Digital Chart)	1
South Korea (Gaon Album Chart)	6

=== Year-end charts ===
Chart (2016)	Peak position
South Korea (Gaon Digital)	22
