= Kim Yu-bin =

South Korean rapper and singer-songwriter (born 1988)

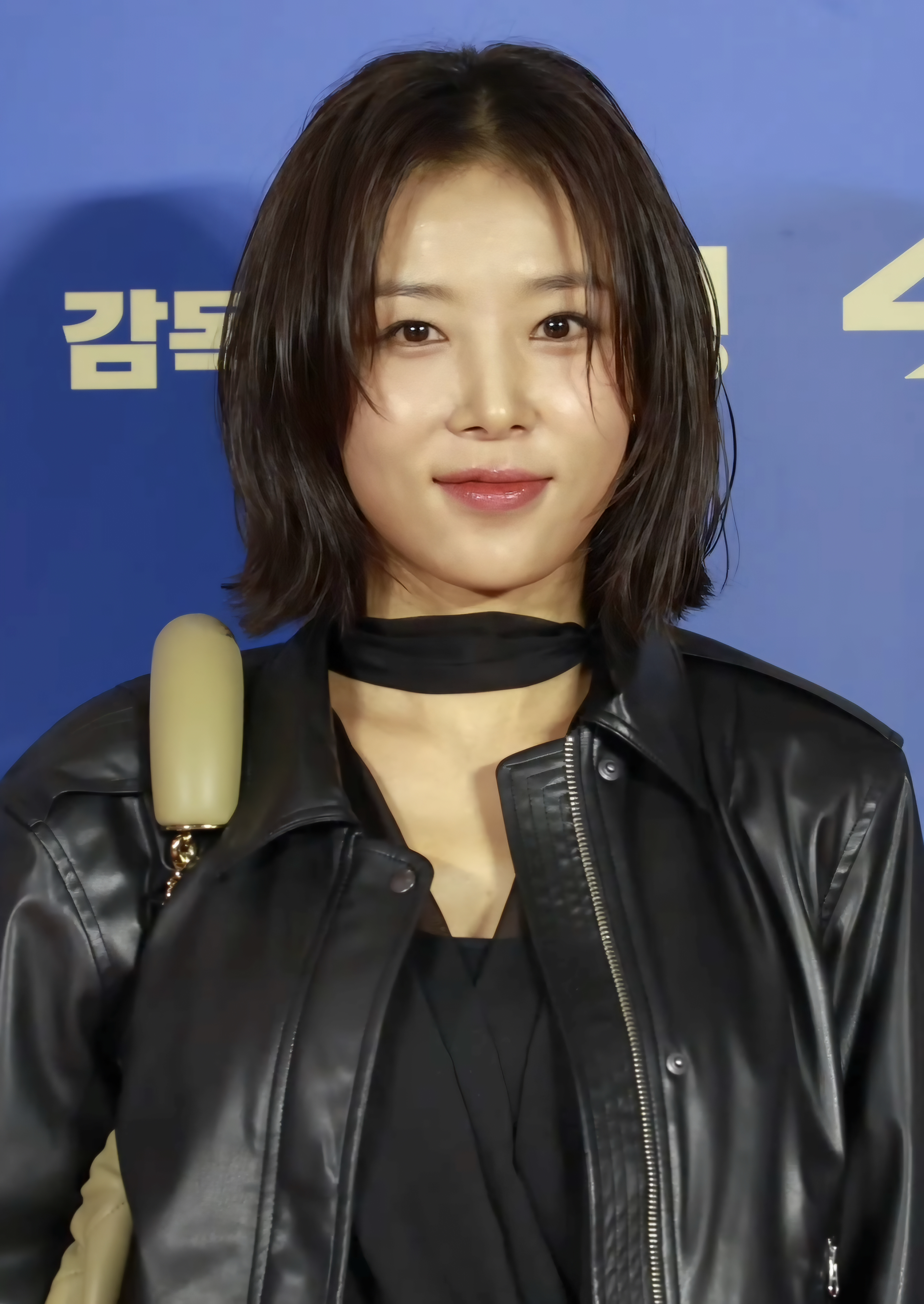
- Kim in April 2024
- Born: October 4, 1988 (age 38); Gwangju, South Korea
- Education: Myongji University
- Occupations: Rapper; singer; songwriter; actress
- Musical career
- Genres: Hip hop; K-pop
- Instruments: Vocals; drums
- Years active: 2007–present
- Labels: Good; JYP; RRR
- Formerly of: Five Girls; Wonder Girls
- Website: rrrentertainment.co.kr/post/yubin-2

Korean name
- Hangul: 김유빈
- Hanja: 金婑斌
- RR: Gim Yubin
- MR: Kim Yubin

Kim Yu-bin (Korean: 김유빈; born October 4, 1988), referred to as Yubin, is a South Korean rapper, singer-songwriter and actress. Kim is a founder and CEO of the entertainment agency RRR Entertainment. She initially rose to fame as a member of South Korean girl group Wonder Girls, formed in 2007 by JYP and active with the group until disbanded in 2017. She made her solo debut in 2018 with the single "Lady".

== Life and career ==
=== 1988–2007: Early life, education and struggles ===
Kim Yu-bin was born in Gwangju, on October 4, 1988. She lived in Korea until high school, attending Anyang High School for a while before moving to San Jose, California, where she spent part of high school. Kim graduated from Myongji University with a degree in Film and Music.

She was originally set to debut as a member of Five Girls under Good Entertainment, along with G.NA, After School's Uee, Secret's Jun Hyo-seong, and Spica's Yang Ji-won. However, the group disbanded shortly before their scheduled debut in 2007 due to Good Entertainment's financial troubles and the members all left for separate South Korean entertainment companies.

=== 2007–2017: Wonder Girls ===
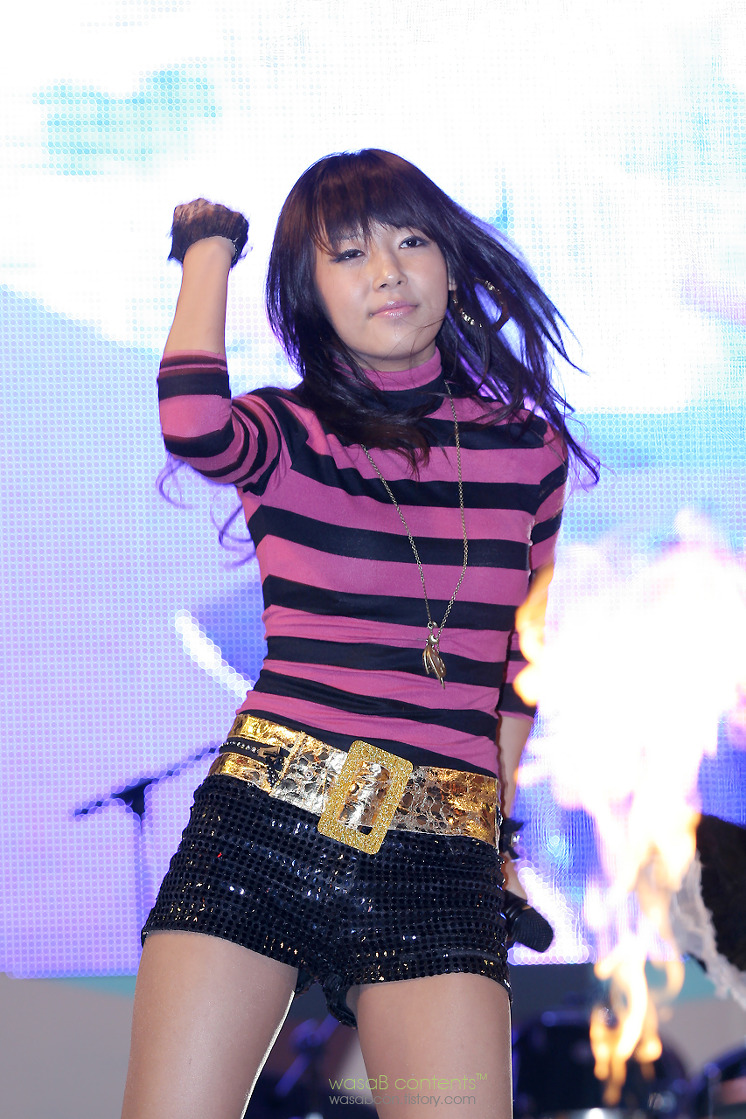
Kim performing at a university festival in 2007

Kim made her debut as a new member of the Wonder Girls on September 7, 2007. She was introduced as the main rapper of the group, replacing Hyuna. Although she is known mostly as the rapper of the Wonder Girls, Kim occasionally acts as an additional vocalist to the group. Examples of which include, "This Time" and "Wishing on a Star". Aside from performing with the group, she has appeared in several music videos including labelmate 2PM's "10 Out of 10" and Shinhwa's "Once in a Life Time". Kim has also featured in several different artists' singles, i.e. Shinhwa's Andy Lee, Lee Min-woo, Kim Bum-soo, and Chun G. In 2008, she made a short cameo in MBC's popular sitcom, Here He Comes.

Kim showcased her written lyrics for the first time in Kim Bum-soo's song "Do You Know That?". Since then, Kim has written her own raps for several other songs. In 2011, she wrote the lyrics for "Girls Girls", "Me, In", and "Sweet Dreams" from the Wonder Girls' second studio album Wonder World. Kim also wrote the song "Hey Boy" for the group's mini album Wonder Party released on June 3, 2012. In 2013, she made her official acting debut in OCN's drama, The Virus, where she played the role of Lee Joo-yeong, a genius hacker and an IT specialist.

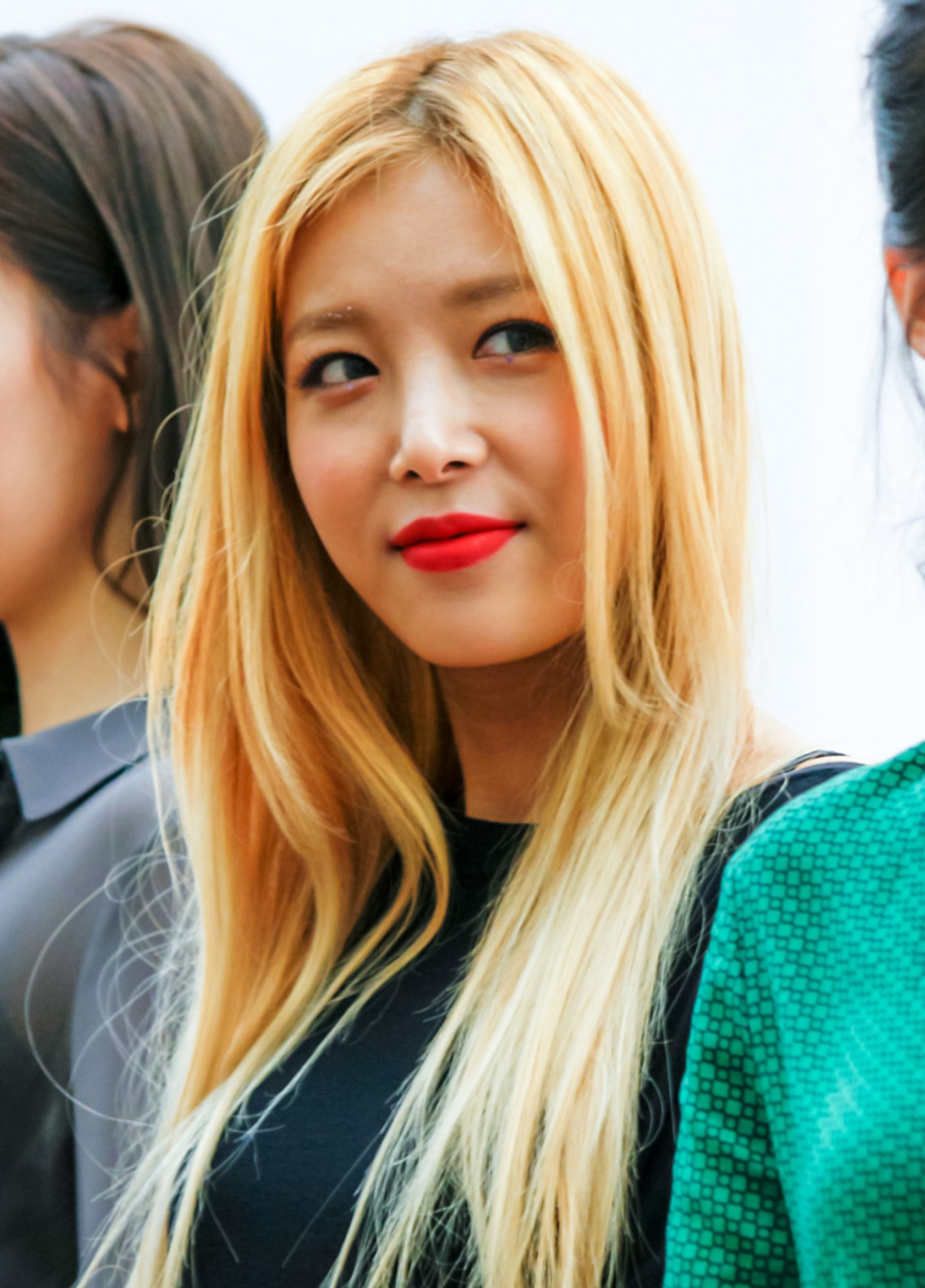
Kim at a fansigning event in 2016

On June 24, 2015, it was announced that the Wonder Girls will be making comeback after two-year hiatus as a band. On August 17, 2015, Kim was confirmed to join Unpretty Rapstar's second season. Her popularity exploded and as a consequence, her makeup and hairstyle became popular in South Korea.

On January 26, 2017, it was announced that the Wonder Girls were to disband after their contracts had expired. Kim was one of two members who chose to remain with JYP Entertainment as solo artists and renewed her contract. The group released their final single, "Draw Me", on February 10.

=== 2018–present: Solo work and RRR Entertainment ===
In April 2018, Kim announced that she was preparing her solo debut through a Cosmopolitan magazine interview. On May 15, JYP Entertainment announced that she has finished filming the music video for the lead single, which is planned to be released alongside her album in early June. Kim's first single album City Woman was released digitally on June 5, 2018, with the retro lead single "Lady". The B-side track, "City Lover", was not released due to copyrights after previously announcing the track would be delayed, due to similarities with Mariya Takeuchi's 1984 Japanese city pop song "Plastic Love".

On November 27, 2018, Kim's first EP #TUSM was released digitally alongside the title track "Thank U Soooo Much". The song's lyrics tell off a former partner for providing "too much information" during a breakup, sarcastically thanking them for their unnecessary revelations. Kim co-wrote all three tracks on the EP and also co-composed the third track "Game Over". "Thank U Sooo Much" charted at number 21 on Billboard's World Digital Song Sales chart, marking her first appearance on the chart.

In April 2019, Kim served as a judge for the JTBC dance competition television show Stage K. On October 30, Kim released her third single album, Start of the End, alongside lead single "Silent Movie" featuring Yoon Mi-rae. She co-wrote "Silent Movie" and wrote the B-side track "Not Yours".

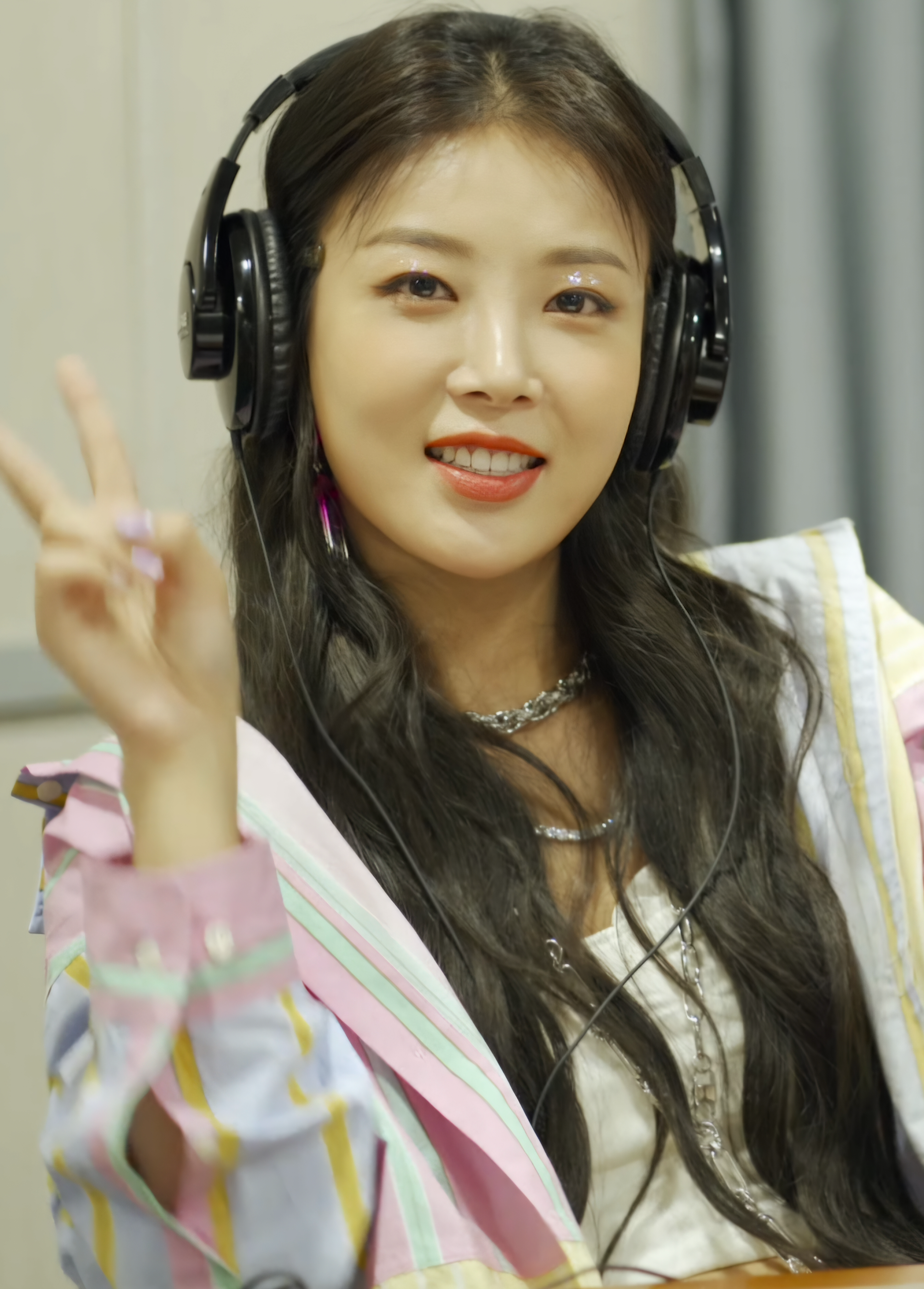
Kim during "Me Time" promotions in 2020

Kim left JYP Entertainment on January 25, 2020, with her departure announced three days later. In February 2020, Kim founded her own music label, RRR Entertainment. Former bandmate Woo Hye-rim was also signed to the label, until February 2023, when Woo decided not to renew her contract with RRR Entertainment.

In May 2020, Kim released her single "Yaya (Me Time)", her first released under her own music label named RRR Entertainment (usually stylized in all lowercase). Since, she has also released the special single "Wave", in partnership with CLEF Entertainment on their project "Traveller", in December 2020.

Her follow-up lead single "Perfume" was released in January 2021, with an accompanying single album. The same year, she competed on MBC's King of Mask Singer as "Snow Flower". She also was a cast member of Goal Girls and We're Family.

In 2022, Kim participated in the television shows The Last Survivor, Dating is Straight, and Queen of Ssireum.

== Discography ==
=== Singles ===
==== As lead artist ====
Title	Year	Peak chart positions			Album
Title	Year	KOR	KOR Hot	US World	Album
"Lady" (숙녀 (淑女))	2018	— (Note: "Lady" did not enter the top 100 Circle Digital Chart, but peaked at number 96 on the Circle Domestic Digital Chart.)	96	—	Non-album singles
"Thank U Soooo Much"	2018	—	—	21	Non-album singles
"Silent Movie" (무성영화) (featuring Yoon Mi-rae)	2019	—	—	—	Non-album singles
"Yaya (Me Time)" (넵넵 (ME TIME))	2020	—	—	—	Non-album singles
"Wave"	2020	—	—	—	Non-album singles
"Perfume" (향수)	2021	— (Note: "Perfume" did not enter the Circle Digital Chart, but peaked at number 30 and 93 on the component Download and BGM charts, respectively.)	—	—	Non-album singles
"—" denotes releases that did not chart or were not released in that region.

==== As featured artist ====
Title	Year	Album
"Odd Imagination" (엉뚱한 상상) (Andy Lee featuring Yubin)	2007	Non album-singles
"Honey" (Honey 꼬시기) (Lee Min-woo featuring Yubin)	2008	Non album-singles
"Do You Know That?" (Kim Bum-soo featuring Yubin)	2008	Non album-singles
"Weak Man" (약한 남자) (Chun G featuring Yubin)	2009	Non album-singles
"It's Time" (Taecyeon featuring San E and Yubin)	2013	Grown (Grand Edition)
"I Dance" (Ivy featuring Yubin)	2013	Non album-single
"Who Am I" (내가 누구) (Sunmi featuring Yubin)	2014	Full Moon
"The Heartbroken" (Justin Thorne featuring Yubin)	2015	Non album-singles
"Ssakda" (싹 다) (The Quiett featuring Yubin)	2015	Non album-singles

==== Collaborations ====
Title	Year	Album
"Encore" (with Yeeun, Hyerim, Min, Nichkhun, Junho, Mark, Jackson, Yugyeom, Nayeon, Jeongyeon, Momo and Mina as JYP Nation)	2016	Non-album single

=== Soundtrack appearances ===
Title	Year	Album
"Ssakda" (싹 다) (featuring The Quiett)	2017	Unpretty Rapstar 2 Compilation
"Who Am I" (후횐 마) (featuring Jo Hyun-ah)	2017	Unpretty Rapstar 2 Compilation
"Rain and Snow" (비 그리고 눈) (with Yoon Jong-shin, Ha Dong-kyun, Kim Feel)	2019	The Call 2: Third Project
"Special"	2020	Chocolate OST

All credits are adapted from MelOn.

=== Songwriting and composing credits ===
All credits are adapted from Korea Music Copyright Association (KMCA) database.

Year	Album	Artist	Song	Lyrics		Music	
Year	Album	Artist	Song	Credited	With	Credited	With
2007	The Wonder Years	Wonder Girls	"Tell Me"	Yes	Park Jin-young	Yes	Park Jin-young
2012	Wonder Party	Wonder Girls	"Hey Boy"	Yes	—N/a	No	—N/a
2015	Reboot (Note: Also credited for arrangement.)	Wonder Girls	"Loved"	Yes	Shim Eun-ji	Yes	Shim Eun-ji
2015	Reboot	Wonder Girls	"John Doe"	Yes	Hong Ji-sang and Ju Hyo	Yes	Hong Ji-sang and Ju Hyo
2015	Reboot	Wonder Girls	"Back"	Yes	Woo Hyerim and Lee Sunmi	Yes	Woo Hyerim and Lee Sunmi
2015	Reboot	Wonder Girls	"없어" (Gone)	Yes	Shim Eun-ji	Yes	Shim Eun-ji
2016	"Why So Lonely"	Wonder Girls	"Why So Lonely"	Yes	Sunmi, Woo Hyerim, Jisang Hong	Yes	Lee Sunmi, Woo Hyerim, Jisang Hong
2016	"Why So Lonely"	Wonder Girls	"To the Beautiful You"	Yes	Woo Hyerim, Sunmi, Frants	Yes	Woo Hyerim, Sunmi, Frants
2016	"Why So Lonely"	Wonder Girls	"Sweet and Easy"	Yes	Park Ye-eun	Yes	Park Ye-eun, Jisang Hong
2017	"Draw Me"	Wonder Girls	"Draw Me"	Yes	Park Ye-eun	Yes	Park Ye-eun
2018	CAELO	Babylon	"너의 흔적에" (You're Not)	Yes	—N/a	Yes	Babylon, Last Nite
2018	#TUSM	Herself	"보내줄게" (I'll Let You Go)	Yes	DOKO	No	—N/a
2018	#TUSM	Herself	"Thank U Soooo Much"	Yes	Shim Eun-ji	No	—N/a
2018	#TUSM	Herself	"Game Over"	Yes	present.	Yes	present., Last Nite
2019	Start of the End	Herself	"Silent Movie" (ft. Yoon Mi-rae)	Yes	Shim Eun-ji	Yes	Shim Eunji
2019	Start of the End	Herself	"Not Yours"	Yes	—N/a	No	—N/a
2020	It'z Me	Itzy	"Nobody Like You"	Yes	Josh Record, Andrew Bullimore	No	—N/a
2020	Yaya (ME TIME) (Note: Credited as album's executive producer.)	Herself	"Yaya (ME TIME)"	Yes	Shim Eun-ji	Yes	Shim Eun-ji, Frederik Jyll, Andreas Ringblom
2020	Traveler, No.501	Herself	"Wave"	Yes	NOOVV(CLEF), Kwon Minho (CLEF), Lim Hee-sun (CLEF), CLEF CREW	No	—N/a
2021	Perfume (Note: Credited as album's executive producer.)	Herself	"Perfume"	Yes	Dr.JO	No	—N/a

== Filmography ==
=== Film ===
Year	Title	Role	Notes	Ref.
2010	The Last Godfather	Herself	Cameo	
2012	The Wonder Girls	Herself	—N/a	
2022	Lovely Voice: The Beginning	Unknown	Musical film	

=== Television series ===
Year	Title	Role	Notes	Ref.
2008	Here He Comes	Herself	Cameo	
2013	The Virus	Lee Joo-yeong	—N/a	
2019	VIP	Cha Se-rin	Cameo (episode 3–4)	
2020	Chocolate	Oh Jung-bok	Cameo (episode 2)	

=== Television shows ===
Year	Title	Role	Notes	Ref.
2015	Unpretty Rapstar 2	Contestant	Semi-finalist	
2020	Things These Days	Tcast	with Jun Hyo-seong and Berry Good's Johyun	
2021	King of Mask Singer	Contestant	as "Snow Flower" (episodes 289–290)	
2021	Kick a Goal	Cast Member	Season 2	
2021	We're Family	Cast Member	—N/a	
2022	The Last Survivor	Participant	—N/a	
2022	Dating is Straight	Host	—N/a	
2022	Queen of Ssireum	Participant	—N/a	
2022	The Second World	Contestant	—N/a	

=== Web shows ===
Year	Title	Role	Ref.
2022	H Club	Host	
2025	Idol ABC Tour	Herself	

=== Radio show ===
Year	Title	Role	Ref.
2021	On Air Spin-off	DJ	

=== Music videos ===
Title	Year	Director	Ref.
"Lady"	2018	Naive Creative Production	
"Thank U Soooo Much"	2018	FantazyLab	
"Silent Movie" feat. Yoonmirae	2019	itchcock	
"yaya (ME TIME)"	2020	Woojin Yeom	
"Wave"	2020	Unknown	
"Perfume"	2021	Unknown	

== Awards and nominations ==
Name of the award ceremony, year presented, category, nominee of the award, and the result of the nomination
Award ceremony	Year	Category	Nominee / Work	Result	Ref.
Korea Arts and Culture Awards	2022	Beauty Icon Award	Yubin	Won	
