= Single (music) =

Release with one to three tracks

Common forms of physical music singles

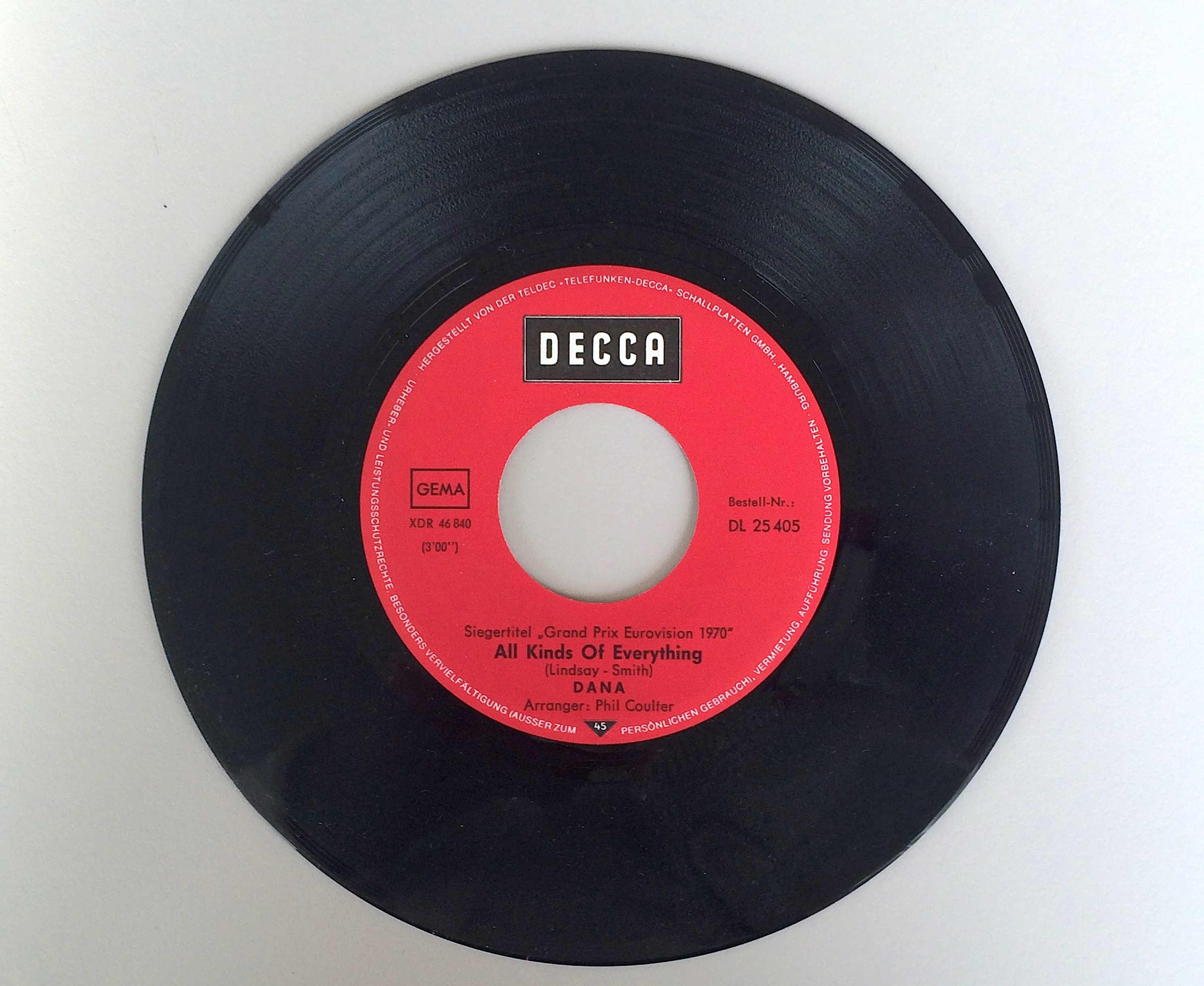
A 7-inch vinyl record single

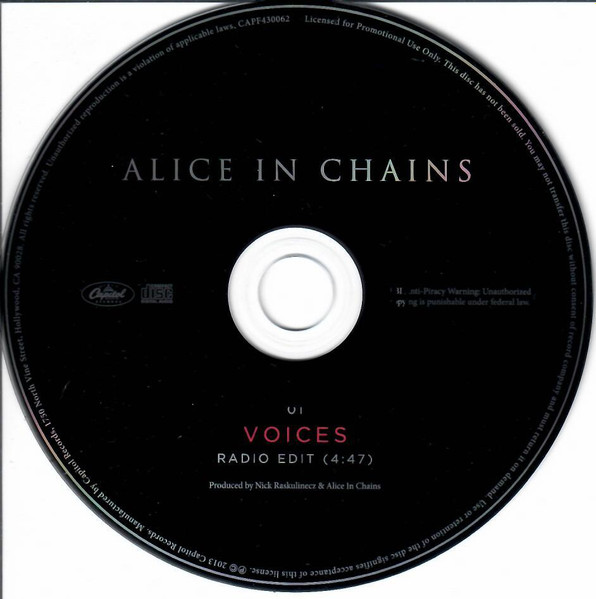
A CD single (12 cm/"full-size")

In music, a single is a type of release of a song recording of fewer tracks than an album (LP). As the name suggests, a single typically contains only a single song, but they can sometimes have two.

A single can be released for sale to the public in a variety of physical or digital formats. Singles may be standalone tracks or connected to an artist's album, and in the latter case would often have at least one single release before the album itself, called lead singles.

The single was defined in the mid-20th century with the 45 (named after its speed in revolutions per minute), a type of 7-inch sized vinyl record containing an A-side and a B-side, i.e. one song on each side. The single format was highly influential in pop music and the early days of rock and roll, and it was the format used for jukeboxes and preferred by younger populations in the 1950s and 1960s.

Singles in digital form became very popular in the 2000s. Distinctions for what makes a single have become more tenuous since the biggest digital music distributor, the iTunes Store, only accepts as singles releases with three tracks or fewer that are less than ten minutes each (with longer releases being classified as EPs or albums). However, releases which do not fit these criteria have been promoted as singles by artists and labels elsewhere, such as on Spotify and the Bandcamp storefront.

Nowadays physically released music is mainly bought in the form of albums instead of singles. The most common physical formats of singles had been the 7-inch (45) vinyl records and the CD single, but singles have also been released on other formats such as 12-inch vinyl records, 10-inch shellac records, cassette single, and mini CD.

== Early history ==
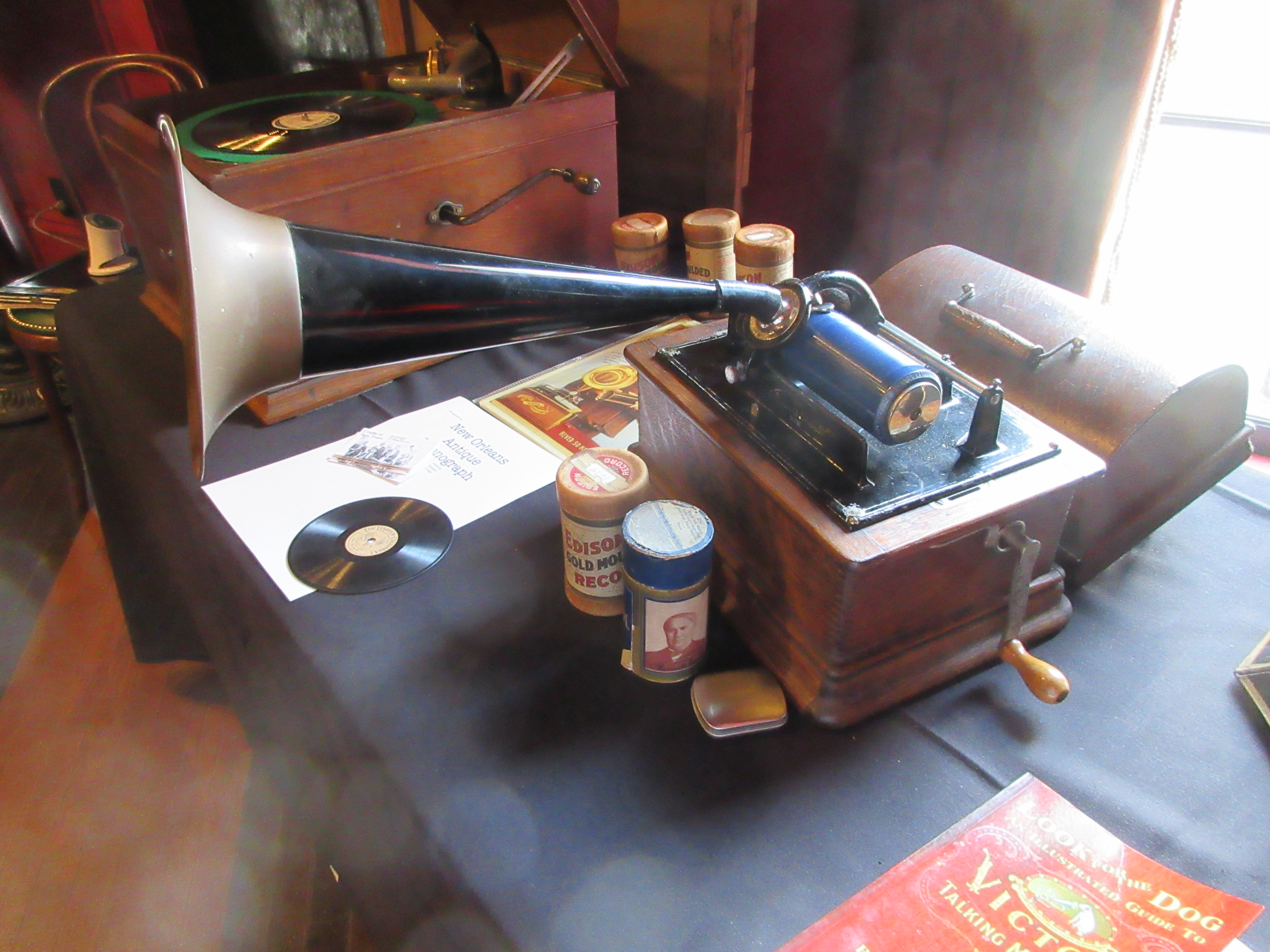
An Edison cylinder phonograph, an early format used for distributing recorded singles in the late 19th century

The origins of the single are in the late 19th century, when music was distributed on phonograph cylinders that held two to four minutes' worth of audio. They were superseded by disc phonograph records, which initially also had a short duration of playing time per side. In the first two to three decades of the 20th century, almost all commercial music releases were, in effect, singles (the exceptions were usually for classical music pieces, where multiple physical storage media items were bundled together and sold as an album). Phonograph records were manufactured with a range of playback speeds (from 16 to 78 rpm) and in several sizes (including 12 inches or 30 centimetres). By about 1910, however, the 10-inch (25 cm), 78 rpm shellac disc had become the most commonly used format.

The inherent technical limitations of the gramophone disc defined the standard format for commercial recordings in the early 20th century. The relatively crude disc-cutting techniques of the time and the thickness of the needles used on record players limited the number of grooves per inch that could be inscribed on the disc surface and a high rotation speed was necessary to achieve acceptable recording and playback fidelity. 78 rpm was chosen as the standard because of the introduction of the electrically powered synchronous turntable motor in 1925, which ran at 3,600 rpm with a 46:1 gear ratio, resulting in a rotation speed of 78.3 rpm.

With these factors applied to the 10-inch format, songwriters and performers increasingly tailored their output to fit the new medium. The three-minute single remained the standard into the 1960s, when the availability of microgroove recording and improved mastering techniques enabled recording artists to increase the duration of their recorded songs. The breakthrough came in the U.K. with The Animals' "The House of the Rising Sun" of 4 minutes 29 seconds (cut down to 2 minutes 59 seconds for the U.S. market) in 1964, followed by Bob Dylan's "Like a Rolling Stone" in 1965: although Columbia Records tried to make the record more radio-friendly by cutting the performance into halves and separating them between the two sides of the disc, both Dylan and his fans demanded that the full six-minute take be placed on one side and that radio stations play the song in its entirety. The next milestone, which cemented pop radio's tolerance for longer songs, was the Beatles' "Hey Jude", which was released August 1968 and clocked in at over seven minutes, pushing the limits of the 45 rpm single.

== Types of physical singles ==
Singles have been issued in various formats, including 7-inch (18 cm), 10-inch and 12-inch discs, usually playing at 45 rpm; 10-inch shellac discs, playing at 78 rpm; maxi singles; 7-inch plastic flexi discs; cassettes; 8 or 12 cm (3.1 or 4.7 in) CD singles, and less commonly on Digital Compact Cassette and many non-standard sizes of vinyl disc (5 in or 13 cm, 8 in or 20 cm, etc.). Singles were also released on DVD, CD Video, and Laserdisc video formats, which would additionally contain music videos to be watched on a display such as a television set.

=== 7-inch format ===
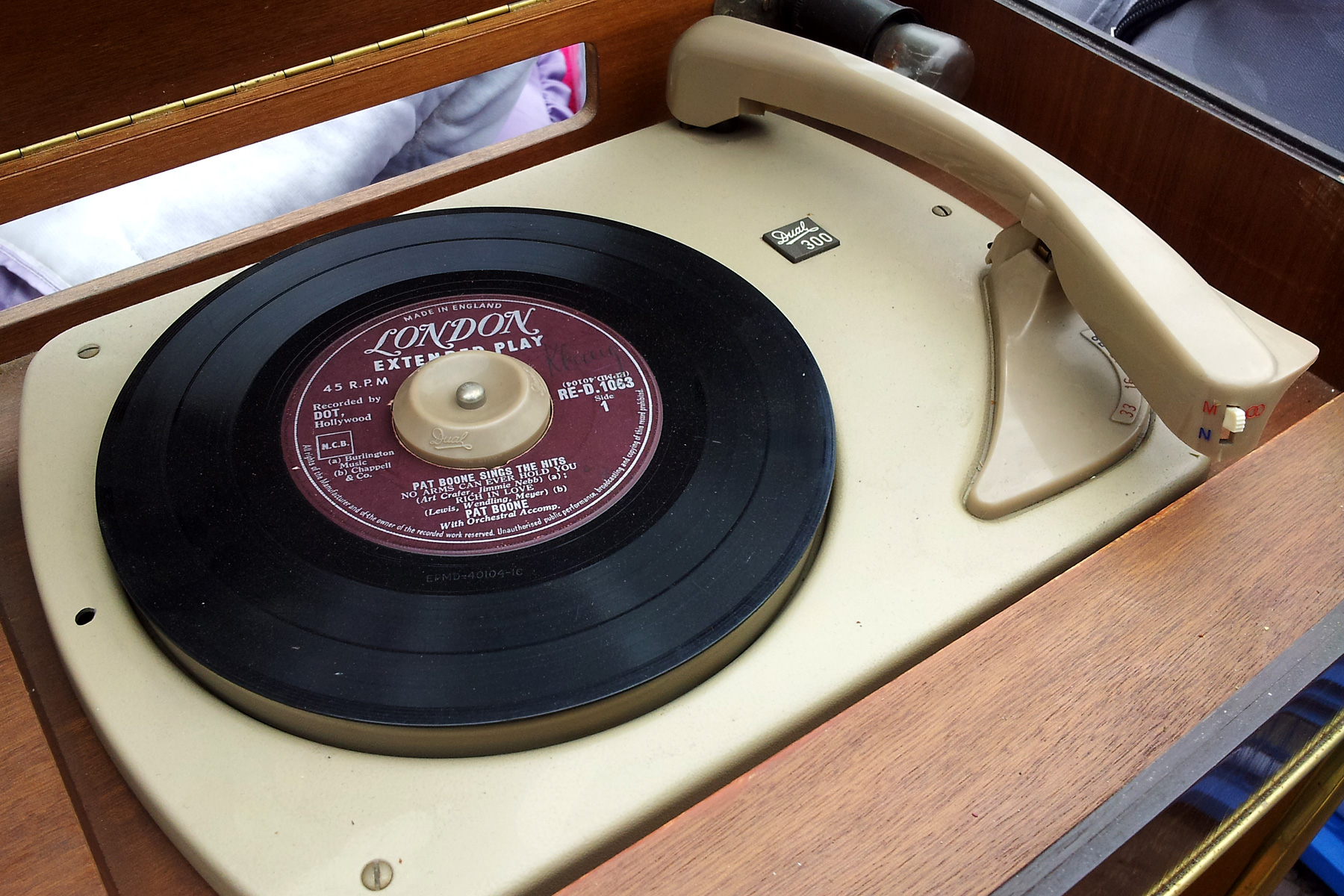
45-rpm EP on a turntable with a 1 1/2-inch hub, ready to be played

The most common form of the vinyl single is the 45 or 7-inch. The names are derived from its play speed, 45 rpm, and the standard diameter, 7 inches (17.8 cm). The 45 rpm speed was chosen to allow a 5 1/2-minute playing time from the 7-inch disc.

The 7-inch 45 rpm record was released March 31, 1949, by RCA Victor as a smaller, more durable and higher-fidelity replacement for 78-rpm shellac discs. The first 45 rpm records were monaural, and had recordings on both sides of the disc (i.e. each side had a song on it, rather than leaving one side blank). As stereo recordings became popular in the 1960s, almost all 45 rpm records were being produced in stereo by the early 1970s. Columbia Records, which had released the 33 1/3 rpm 12-inch vinyl LP in June 1948, also released 7-inch vinyl singles at 33 1/3 rpm in March 1949, but they were soon eclipsed by the RCA Victor 45. The first regular production 45 rpm record pressed was "PeeWee the Piccolo", RCA Victor 47-0146, on December 7, 1948, at the Sherman Avenue plant in Indianapolis; R.O. Price was the plant manager at the time.

The claim made that 48–0001 by Eddy Arnold was the first 45 is evidently incorrect (while it is true that no record 48-0000 has been found, 50-0000-Crudup, 51-0000-Meisel, and 52-0000-Goodman exist) since all 45s that had been produced in late 1948 and early 1949 were released simultaneously with the 45 player in March 1949. Plenty of information had been leaked to the public about the new 45 rpm system through front-page articles in Billboard magazine on December 4, 1948, and again on January 8, 1949. RCA was trying to blunt the lead Columbia had established upon releasing their 33 1/3 LP system in June 1948.

To compete with Columbia, RCA released albums as boxes of 45 rpm seven-inch singles that could be arranged to play continuously using their record changer. RCA was also releasing 7-inch singles pressed in different colors for different genres, making it easy for customers to find their preferred music. The novelty of multicolored singles wore off soon: by 1952, all RCA singles were pressed in black vinyl.

The lightweight and inexpensive 45 rpm discs introduced by RCA were quickly popular and in the early 1950s all major US labels had begun manufacturing seven-inch singles. In the decades that followed, the seven-inch single was the format that many major artists made their recording debut on, and some recordings were released only as vinyl 45s. According to the New York Times, the popularity of the seven-inch single reached a peak in 1974 when 200 million were sold. Its popularity declined after that as jukeboxes became fewer, consumers were tending to prefer albums, and formats such as cassettes and CDs began overtaking vinyl 45s. Despite the major decline, vinyl seven-inch singles continued to be released in the 2000s by indie labels such as Sub Pop and Third Man Records.

==== Variations ====
In some regions (e.g. North America), the default hole size on a 45 fits the RCA 1 1/2-inch (38 mm) hub which, due to a format war, is incompatible with the 1/4-inch (6 mm) spindle of a Columbia-system 33 1/3 rpm 12-inch LP player. In other regions (e.g. UK and Australia), the default is a small hole compatible with a multi-speed 1/4-inch spindle player, but with a knock-out that can be removed for usage on a player with a larger hub.

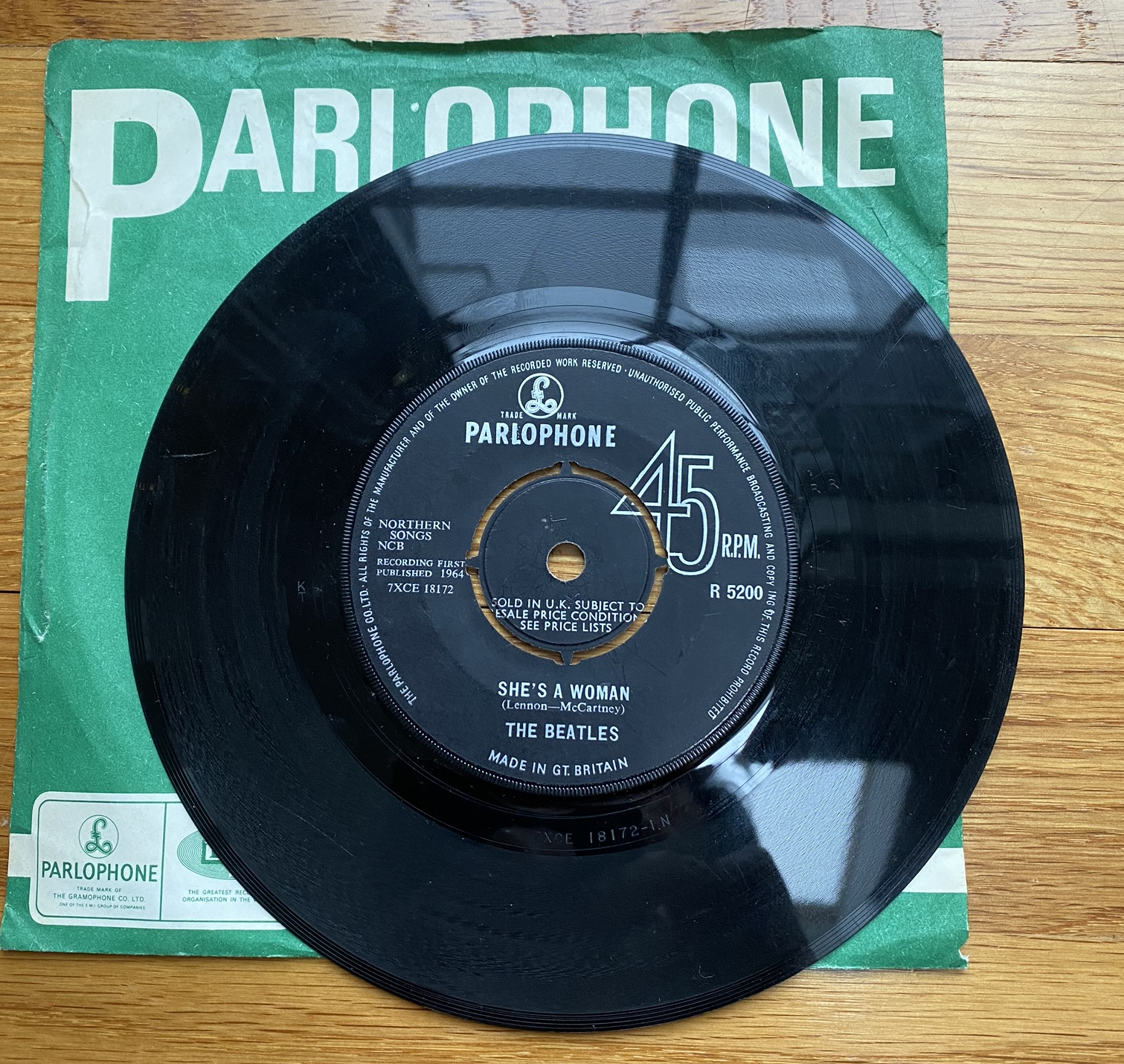
In some regions (e.g. Ireland and UK), 7-inch 45 rpm records were sold for a 1/4-inch spindle, and had a knock-out for playing on a 1 1/2-inch hub.

One can play a large-hole record on a player with a 1/4-inch spindle by inserting a plastic puck into the hole, or by using a spindle adapter.

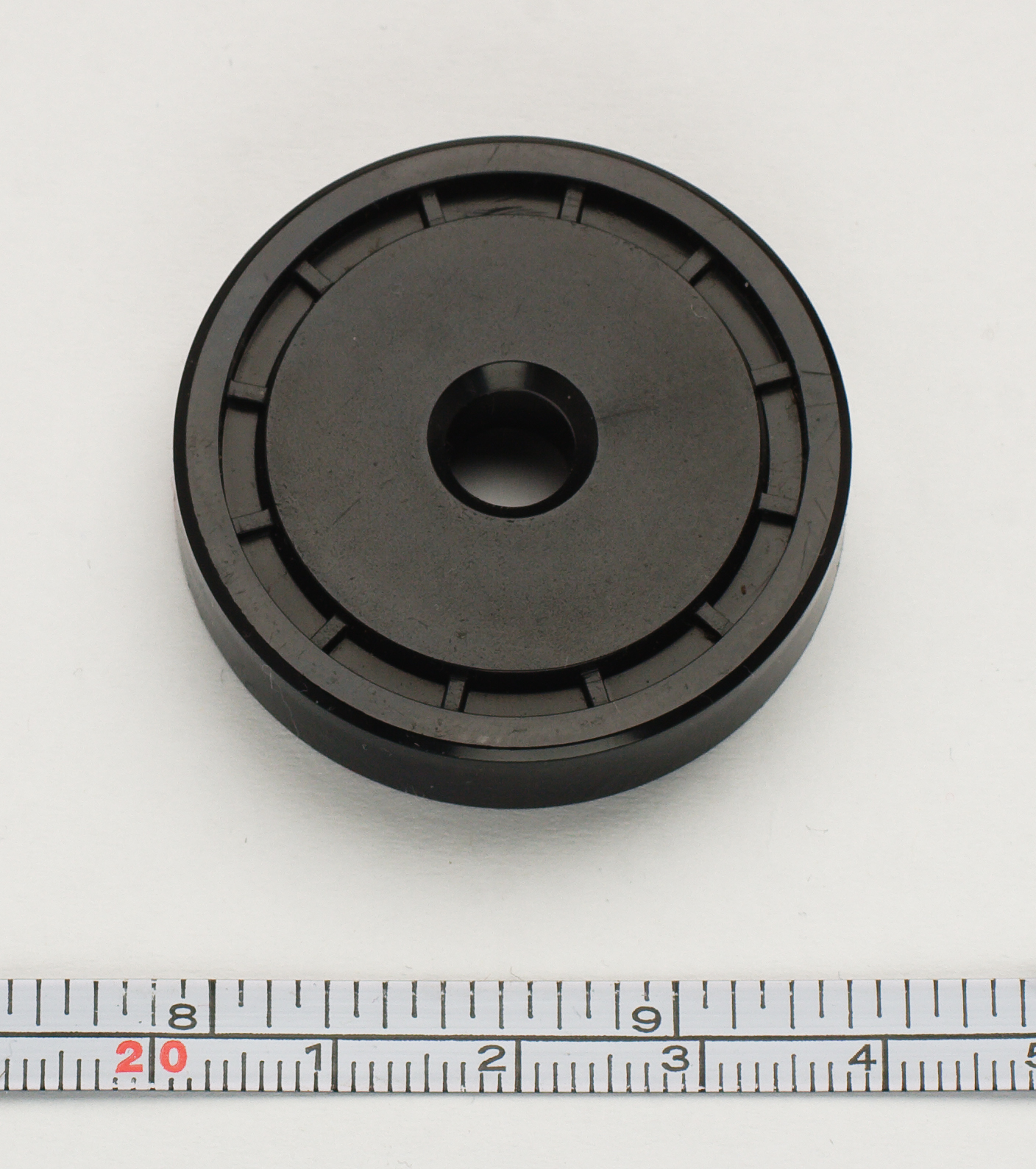
A single puck for insertion into a large-hole 45 single (North America) to play it on a 1/4-inch spindle

=== 12-inch format ===
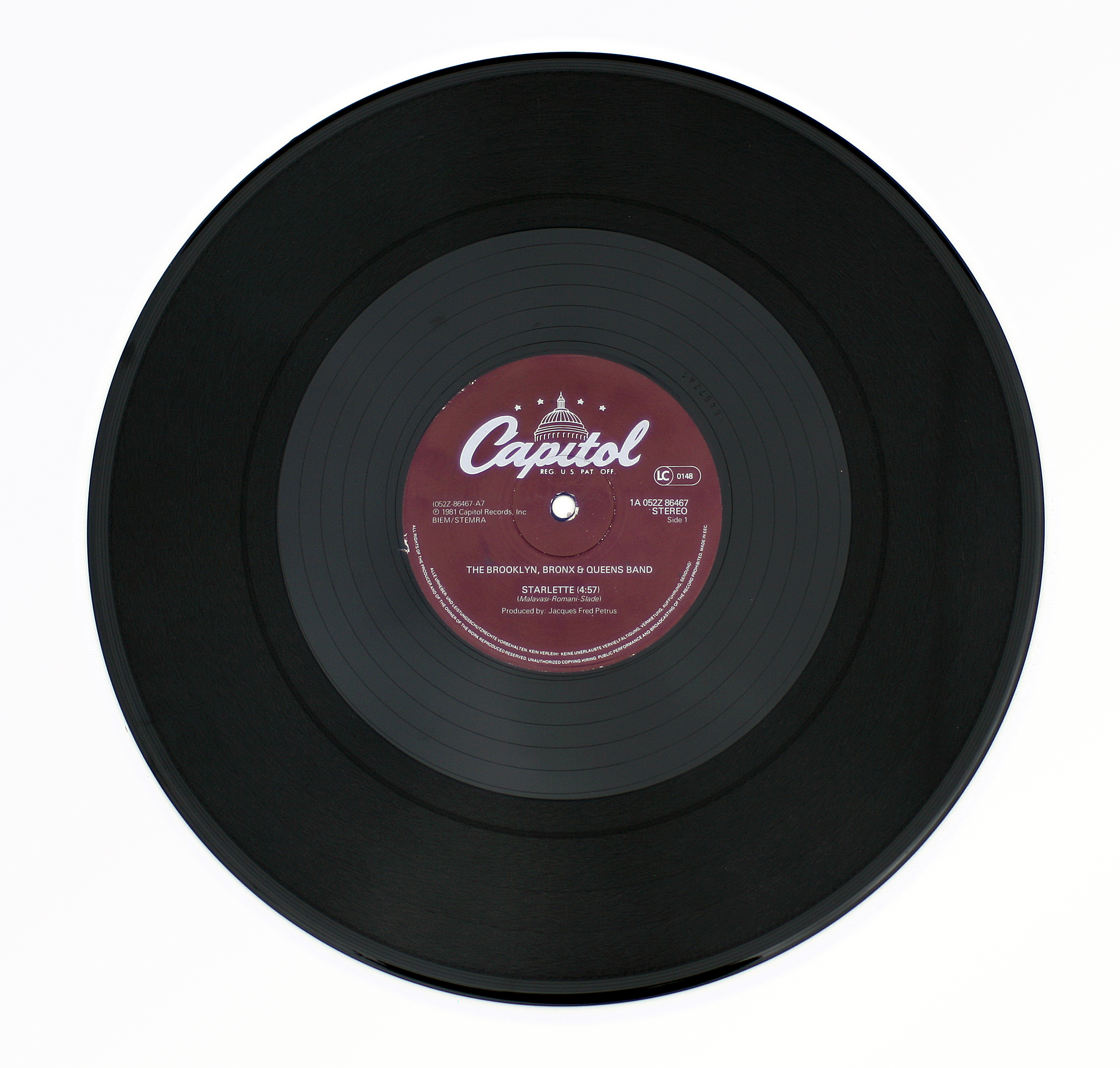
A 12-inch gramophone record

Although 7 inches remained the standard size for vinyl singles, 12-inch singles (30 cm) were introduced for use by DJs in discos in the 1970s. The longer playing time of these singles allowed the inclusion of extended dance mixes of tracks. In addition, the larger surface area of the 12-inch discs allowed for wider grooves (larger amplitude) and greater separation between grooves, the latter of which results in less cross-talk. Consequently, they are less susceptible to wear and scratches. The 12-inch single is still considered a standard format for dance music, though its popularity has declined in recent years.

=== 10-inch format ===
Before the 7-inch single was introduced, 78 rpm 10-inch (25 cm) shellac records with around three minutes of music on them were the standard format.

== Digital era ==
With the rise of digital downloading and audio streaming, individual tracks within an album became accessible separately. Despite this shift, the notion of a single from an album remains, pinpointing the more promoted or favored songs. The surge in music downloads escalated following the introduction of Apple's iTunes Store originally known as iTunes in January 2001, along with the emergence of portable music devices like the iPod.

In September 1997, with the release of Duran Duran's "Electric Barbarella" for paid downloads, Capitol Records became the first major label to sell a digital single from a well-known artist. Previously, Geffen Records also released Aerosmith's "Head First" digitally for free. In 2004, the Recording Industry Association of America (RIAA) introduced digital single certification due to significant sales of digital formats, with Gwen Stefani's "Hollaback Girl" becoming RIAA's first platinum digital single. In 2013, RIAA incorporated on-demand streams into the digital single certification.

Single sales in the United Kingdom reached a low in January 2005, as the popularity of the compact disc was overtaken by the then-unofficial medium of the music download. Recognizing this, on 17 April 2005, Official UK Singles Chart added the download format to the existing format of physical CD singles. Gnarls Barkley was the first act to reach No.1 on this chart through downloads alone in April 2006, for their debut single "Crazy", which was released physically the following week. On 1 January 2007, digital downloads (including unbundled album tracks) became eligible from the point of release, without the need for an accompanying physical. Sales gradually improved in the following years, reaching a record high in 2008 that still proceeded to be overtaken in 2009, 2010 and 2011.

In the late 2010s, artists began a trend of releasing multiple singles before eventually releasing a studio album. An unnamed A&R representative confirmed to Rolling Stone in 2018 that "an artist has to build a foundation to sustain" and added that "When artists have one big record and go run with that, it doesn't work because they never had a foundation to begin with." The same article cited examples such as Cardi B, Camila Cabello and Jason Derulo releasing four or more singles prior to their album releases. Kanye West released singles weekly in 2010 with his GOOD Fridays series. He did this to support his upcoming release at the time, My Beautiful Dark Twisted Fantasy, and ended up releasing 15 tracks in the program.

CD singles and 7-inch records are now obscure and uncommon for new releases: as of the 2020s singles are predominantly digital, and physical releases are mainly albums instead, on CD and 12-inch LPs.

== Culture ==
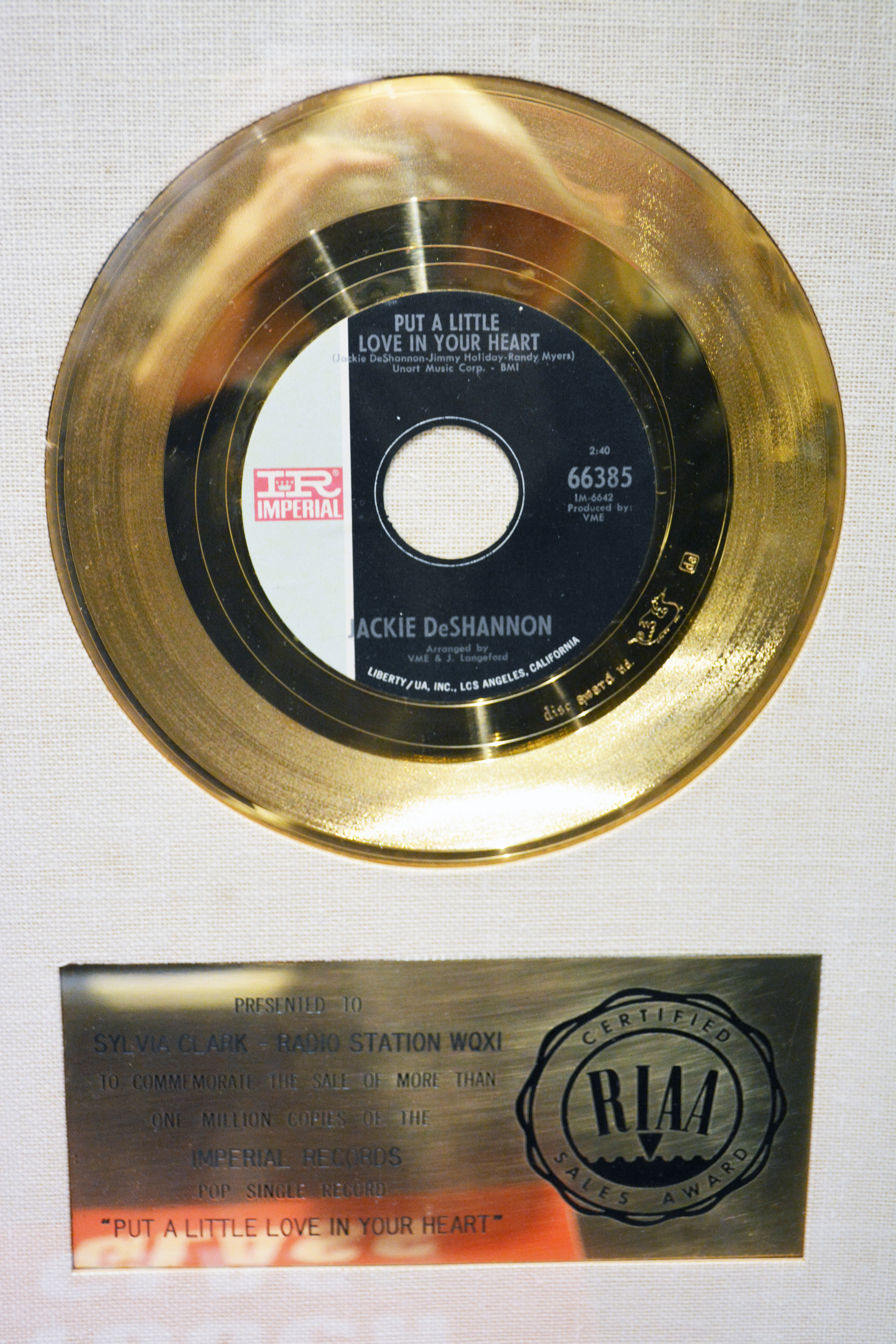
"Put a Little Love in Your Heart" was a hit single for Jackie DeShannon in 1968. It was certified Gold in the US, selling over 1,000,000 copies.

The sales of singles are recorded in record charts in most countries in a Top 40 format. The charts are often published in magazines and numerous television shows and radio programs count down the list. To be eligible for inclusion in charts, the single must meet the requirement set by the charting company that governs the playing time of the single.

In popular music, the commercial and artistic importance of the single (as compared to the EP or album) has varied over time, technological development, and according to the audience of particular artists and genres. Singles have generally been more important to artists who sell to the youngest purchasers of music (younger teenagers and pre-teens), who tend to have more limited financial resources.

Starting in the mid-1960s, albums became a greater focus and became more important as artists created albums of uniformly high-quality and coherent themes, a trend that reached its apex in the development of the concept album. Over the 1990s and the early 2000s, the single generally received less and less attention in the United States as albums, which on compact disc had virtually identical production and distribution costs but could be sold at a higher price, became most retailers' primary method of selling music. Singles continued to be produced in the UK and Australia and survived the transition from compact disc to digital download. The decline of the physical single in the US during this time has been cited as a major marketing mistake on the part of record companies, as it eliminated an inexpensive recording format for young fans to become accustomed to purchasing music. In its place was the predominance of the album, which alienated customers by the expense of purchasing a longer format for only one or two songs of interest. That in turn encouraged interest in file sharing software on the internet like Napster for single recordings, which began to undercut the music recording market.

Dance music, however, has followed a different commercial pattern and the single, especially the 12-inch vinyl single, remains a major method by which dance music is distributed.

Another development of the 2000s was the popularity of mobile phone ringtones based on pop singles. In September 2007, Sony BMG announced that it would introduce a new type of CD single, called ringles, for the 2007 holiday season. The format included three songs by an artist, plus a ringtone accessible from the user's computer. Sony announced plans to release 50 singles in October and November, and Universal Music Group expected to release somewhere between 10 and 20 titles. In a reversal of this trend, a single has been released based on a ringtone itself: the Crazy Frog ringtone, which was a cult hit in Europe in 2004, was released as a mashup with "Axel F" in June 2005 amid a massive publicity campaign and subsequently hit No. 1 on the UK chart.

The term single is sometimes regarded as a misnomer since one record usually contains two songs: the A-side and B-side. In 1982, CBS marketed one-sided singles at a lower price than two-sided singles.

=== In South Korea ===
In South Korean music, the terminology for albums and singles is unique and includes an additional term, the single album (Korean: 싱글 음반; RR: singgeul eumban). In contemporary usage in English, the term album refers to an LP-length recording regardless of the medium. In contrast, under the country's copyright law, the Korean usage of "album" (Korean: 음반; RR: eumban) denotes a musical recording of any length that is released specifically on physical media. A single album refers to a physical release (such as a CD, LP, or other media) that typically contains one to three unique tracks, while a single is only a song itself, typically a digital stream or download. Although the terms single albums and singles are similar and sometimes may overlap, they are generally considered two distinct release types in South Korea. In Western contexts, a single album would otherwise be called a single or extended play, depending on the length.

As a distinct release type, the single album developed during the CD era in the 1990s. Single albums were marketed as a more affordable alternative to a full-length CD album. The Circle Album Chart tracks sales of all albums released as physical media (described as offline media), therefore, single albums compete alongside full-length studio albums (LPs) and mini-albums (EPs) on the chart, even if they only contain one song. The Circle Digital Chart, which tracks downloads and streams of sole tracks, is regarded as the official singles chart.

To give an example of the differences between full-length albums, single albums, and singles, the K-pop girl group Wonder Girls released the single album The Wonder Begins, which consists of the single "Irony" alongside two other unique tracks and a remix. "Irony" was later included on their debut studio album The Wonder Years.

A single album is distinct from a single even if it includes only one song. The single "Gotta Go" by Chungha was released on a single album titled XII, which was a one-track CD. Even though "Gotta Go" was the only song on XII, the two releases charted separately: XII reached No. 4 on the Gaon Album Chart, and "Gotta Go" reached No. 2 on the Circle Digital Chart. Even when a single album and single share the same name, they still chart separately, as was the case with the Wonder Girls single album and single "Why So Lonely": the single album peaked at No. 3 on the Gaon Album Chart, while the single peaked at No. 1 on the Gaon Digital Chart.

== See also ==
- Gramophone record
- Lead single
- List of best-selling singles
- Promotional recording
