= Park Ye-eun =

South Korean singer (born 1989)

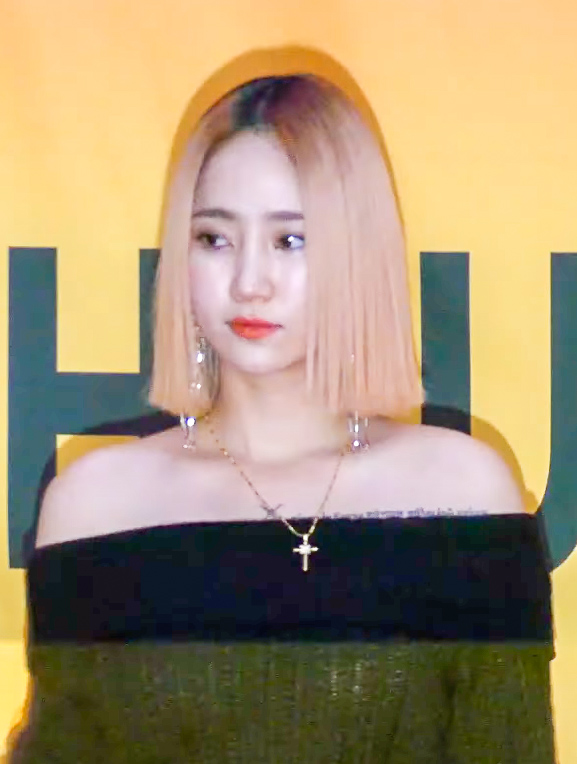
- Park in 2018

Background information
- Also known as: Ha:tfelt; Yenny
- Born: May 26, 1989 (age 37); Goyang, South Korea
- Genres: K-pop; R&B; jazz
- Occupations: Singer; songwriter; composer
- Instruments: Vocals; piano
- Years active: 2007–present
- Labels: JYP; Amoeba Culture
- Formerly of: Wonder Girls; JYP Nation

Korean name
- Hangul: 박예은
- Hanja: 朴譽恩
- RR: Bak Yeeun
- MR: Pak Yeŭn

Park Ye-eun (Korean: 박예은; born May 26, 1989), professionally known as Yeeun, Yenny, or Ha:tfelt (핫펠트), is a South Korean singer, songwriter and composer known for her work as a former member of South Korean girl group Wonder Girls. In July 2014, she made her debut as solo artist under the name Ha:tfelt with released her solo EP Me?. In early 2017, Wonder Girls officially disbanded due to contract expiration. Following the disbandment, Yeeun signed with Amoeba Culture to continue her career as solo artist.

== Career ==
=== 2007–2013: Career beginnings ===
In January 2007, Park was revealed as the fifth member of Wonder Girls. The group officially debuted on MBC's Show! Music Core on February 10, 2007. She composed the songs "Saying I Love You" and "For Wonderful", and performed them live in one of Wonder Girls' US concerts. She also composed "G.N.O (Girl's Night Out)" from their sophomore album and Wonder World.

In 2012, Park wrote a song for the Korean drama series Dream High 2, which was released on February 14, 2012. She later made a cameo appearance on the drama to perform the song.

=== 2014–present: Solo debut ===
On July 31, 2014, Park made her debut as solo artist under the pseudonym HA:TFELT (an amalgamation of the words "hot" and "heartfelt;" the British pronunciation of "heartfelt") with her debut EP Me?. The album was included in Billboard's list of the 10 best K-pop albums of 2014.

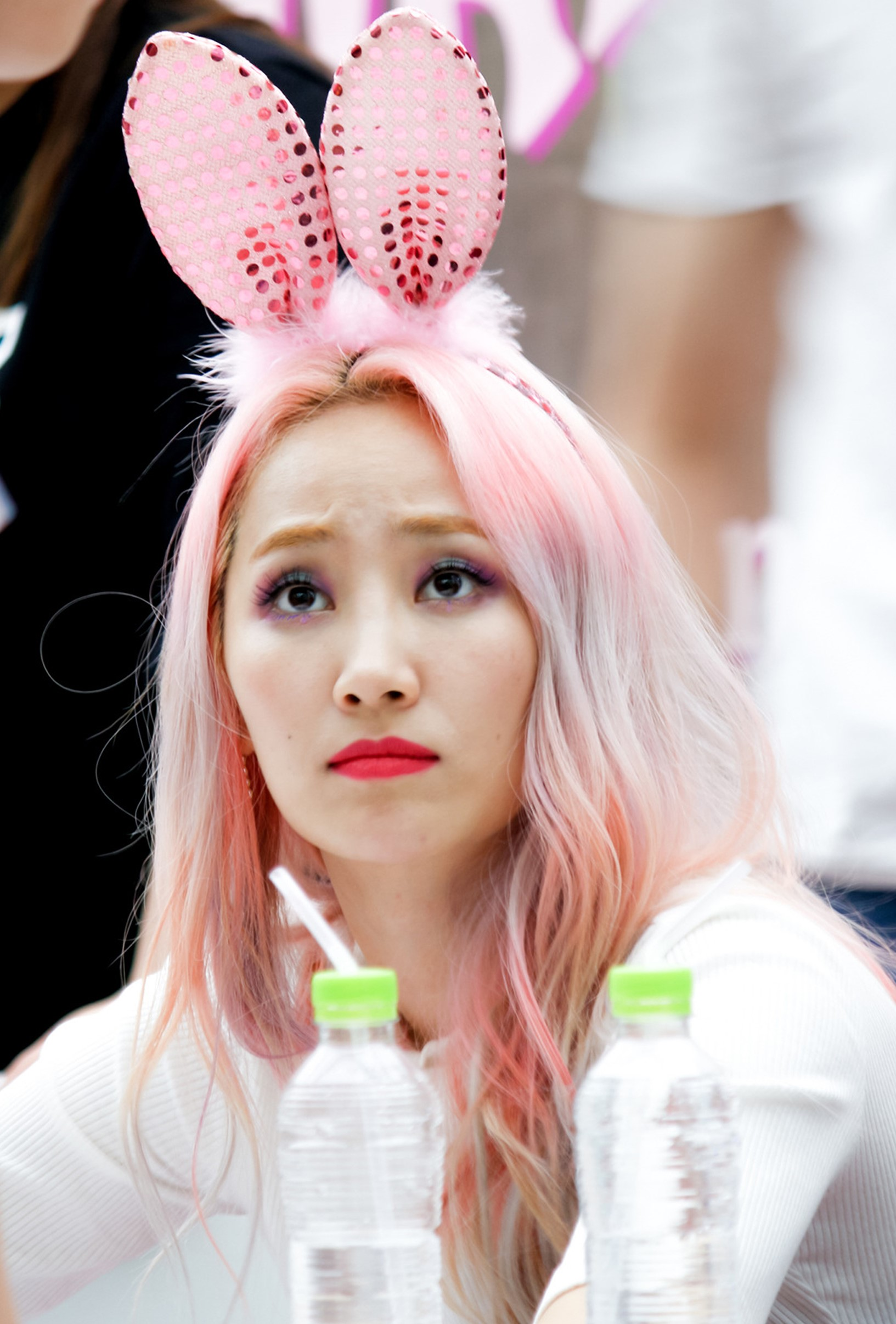
Park at a fansigning event in 2016

In 2015, Wonder Girls returned as a four member rock band with Park as the pianist. On January 26, 2017, it was announced that Wonder Girls were to disband after unsuccessful contract renewal negotiations with some of its members, including Yeeun herself, who parted ways with JYP Entertainment. The group released their final single "Draw Me", co-written by Yeeun, on February 10. The song also served as a celebration of the group's 10th anniversary since debut.

In April 2017, Park signed with Amoeba Culture, becoming the label's first female solo artist in eleven years.

She subsequently released two soundtrack singles for the Korean travel series Cross Country: "Thru The Sky" and "Cross Country," a collaboration track with Kim Bo-hyung and Suran. In May, Yeeun was credited as a songwriter on "Only You" from former labelmate Twice's EP Signal.

On October 12, 2017, Park released her first single, Meine ("mine" in German), consisting of two songs: "I Wander" featuring Dynamic Duo's Gaeko and "Read Me" featuring PUNCHNELLO.

On April 18, 2018, her second single album, Deine ("yours" in German), was released. The single consists of two songs: "Pluhmm" and "Cigar".

On August 1, 2019, Park's single "Happy Now" was released, featuring Moonbyul of Mamamoo.

On April 23, 2020, Park released her first full-length album, 1719, along with music videos for the three leading singles ("Life Sucks," "Sweet Sensation," and "Satellite").

On July 14, 2021, Park released her digital single "Summertime", featuring Keem Hyo-eun.

On April 19, 2022, Park released her single album Left, consisting of four songs.

In November 2022, Park was announced, will hold a solo concert ORANGE Friday' at Shinhan pLay Square Live Hall in Seoul on the 18th.

== Discography ==
=== Studio albums ===
Title	Album details
1719	Released: April 23, 2020; Label: Amoeba Culture; Format: CD, digital download; Track listing: 1. "Life Sucks"; 2. "Piercing" (피어싱) (feat. THAMA); 3. "I Wander" (새 신발) (feat. Gaeko); 4. "Pluhmm" (위로가 돼요); 5. "Read Me" (나란 책) (Guitar ver.); 6. "Cigar"; 7. "Make Love"; 8. "Satellite" (feat. Ash Island); 9. "Sweet Sensation" (feat. SOLE); 10. "Solitude"; 11. "3mins" (3분만) (feat. Choiza); 12. "Bluebird"; 13. "Sky Gray"; 14. "How to Love"

=== Extended plays ===
Title	Album details	Peak chart positions	Sales
Title	Album details	KOR	Sales
Me?	Released: July 31, 2014; Label: JYP Entertainment; Formats: CD, digital download	6	KOR: 4,652+

=== Single albums ===
Title	Album details	Peak chart positions	Sales
Title	Album details	KOR	Sales
Meine	Released: October 12, 2017; Label: Amoeba Culture; Format: CD, digital download; Track listing: 1. "I Wander" (새 신발) (feat. Gaeko); 2. "Read Me" (나란 책) (feat. Punchnello)	—	—N/a
Deine	Released: April 18, 2018; Label: Amoeba Culture; Format: CD, digital download; Track listing: 1. "Pluhmm" (위로가 돼요); 2. "Cigar"	—	—N/a
Left	Released: April 19, 2022; Label: Amoeba Culture; Format: CD, digital download; Track listing: 1. "Left"; 2. "Every Love"; 3. "Fine!"; 4. "Tempo"	49	KOR: 1,345
"—" denotes releases that did not chart or were not released in that region. "*" denotes the chart did not exist at that time.

=== Singles ===
Title	Year	Peak chart positions	Sales (DL)	Album
Title	Year	KOR	Sales (DL)	Album
As lead artist
"Ain't Nobody"	2014	16	KOR: 91,272+	Me?
"There Must Be" (with Joo Hyo)	2015	—	—N/a	Non-album single
"I Wander" (새 신발) (featuring Gaeko)	2017	— (Note: "I Wander" did not enter the Gaon Digital Chart, but it debuted and peaked at number 86 on the component Gaon Download Chart.)	KOR: 18,949+	1719
"Pluhmm" (위로가 돼요)	2018	—	—N/a	1719
"Happy Now" (featuring Moonbyul)	2019	—	—N/a	Non-album single
"Cigar"	2020	—	—N/a	1719
"Satellite" (featuring Ash Island)	2020	—	—N/a	1719
"Sweet Sensation"	2020	—	—N/a	1719
"Solitude"	2020	—	—N/a	1719
"Life Sucks"	2020	—	—N/a	1719
"La Luna" (라 루나)	2020	—	—N/a	Non-album singles
"Natural Mineral" (나 오늘) (with Dynamic Duo, snzae, THAMA, SOLE	2020	—	—N/a	Non-album singles
"Summertime" (featuring Keem Hyo-eun)	2021	— (Note: "Summertime" did not enter the Gaon Digital Chart, but it debuted and peaked at number 69 on the component Gaon Download Chart.)	—N/a	Non-album singles
"Fine!"	2022	— (Note: "Fine!" did not enter the Gaon Digital Chart, but it debuted and peaked at number 136 on the component Gaon Download Chart.)	—N/a	Left
As featured artist
"Baby I Love You" (환상의 짝꿍) (H-Eugene featuring Yeeun)	2008	*	—N/a	Baby I Love You
"No Make Up" (화장 지웠어) (Gaeko featuring Zion.T and Ha:tfelt)	2014	2	KOR: 634,315+	Redingray
"Get It?" (알아듣겠지) (Younha featuring Ha:tfelt and Cheetah)	2016	39	KOR: 48,778+	Non-album single
Soundtrack appearances
"Thru The Sky"	2017	—	—N/a	Cross Country OST
"Cross Country" (with Suran, Kim Bo-hyung and Hanna)	2017	—	—N/a	Cross Country OST
"—" denotes releases that did not chart or were not released in that region. "*" denotes the chart did not exist at that time.

== Composition Credits ==
Year	Song	Artist	Album	Lyrics		Music		Arrangement	
Year	Song	Artist	Album	Credited	With	Credited	With	Credited	With
2008	"Saying I Love You"	Wonder Girls	The Wonder Years: Trilogy	Yes	No	Yes	No	No	No
2011	"G.N.O (Girls Night Out)"	Wonder Girls	Wonder World	Yes	No	Yes	Lee Woomin, Fredrik Mats Odesjo	No	No
2011	"Me In" by Shin Jung-hyeon	Wonder Girls	Wonder World	No	No	No	No	Yes	Lee Woomin
2012	"Hello To Myself"	Yeeun	Dream High 2 OST	Yes	No	Yes	Lee Woomin	No	No
2012	"Girlfriend"	Wonder Girls	Wonder Party	Yes	No	Yes	Lee Woomin	No	No
2012	"R.E.A.L"	Wonder Girls	Wonder Party	Yes	No	Yes	Lee Woomin, Fredrik Mats Odesjo	No	No
2013	"So Good"	Leo Kekoa	So Good	Yes	Leo Kekoa, Beenzina	Yes	Fame-J	No	No
2014	"Iron Girl" feat. Hyerim	Ha:tfelt	Me?	Yes	Hyerim, Lee Woomin, Kim Seong-hun	Yes	Lee Woomin	Yes	Lee Woomin
2014	"Truth"	Ha:tfelt	Me?	Yes	Lee Woomin	Yes	Lee Woomin	Yes	Woo-Min Lee 'collapsedone'
2014	"Ain't Nobody"	Ha:tfelt	Me?	Yes	Lee Woomin	Yes	Lee Woomin	Yes	Woo-Min Lee 'collapsedone'
2014	"Bond" feat. Beenzina	Ha:tfelt	Me?	Yes	Beenzina, Lee Woomin, Monty narman	Yes	Beenzina, Lee Woomin, Monty narman	Yes	Beenzina, Lee Woomin, Monty narman
2014	"Wherever Together"	Ha:tfelt	Me?	Yes	Lee Woomin	Yes	Lee Woomin	Yes	Woo-Min Lee 'collapsedone'
2014	"Peter Pan"	Ha:tfelt	Me?	Yes	Lee Woomin	Yes	Lee Woomin	Yes	Woo-Min Lee 'collapsedone'
2014	"Nothing Lasts Forever"	Ha:tfelt	Me?	Yes	Lee Woomin	Yes	Lee Woomin	Yes	Woo-Min Lee 'collapsedone'
2014	"If That Was You"	Sunmi	Full Moon	Yes	Lee Woomin	Yes	Lee Woomin	Yes	Lee Woomin
2015	"Baby Don't Play"	Wonder Girls	Reboot	Yes	Hong Jisang	Yes	Hong Jisang	Yes	Hong Ji-sang
2015	"One Black Night"	Wonder Girls	Reboot	Yes	Choe Seok	Yes	Choe Seok	Yes	Hong Ji-sang
2015	"Remember"	Wonder Girls	Reboot	Yes	Hong Jisang	Yes	Hong Jisang	Yes	Hong Ji-sang
2015	"Who Am I?"	Yubin	Unpretty Rapstar 2	Yes	Yubin	Yes	Yubin, Frants	No	No
2015	"Back And Forth 30 Minutes"	Giriboy	Sexual Perceptions	Yes	Giriboy	No	No	No	No
2015	"There Must Be"	Ha:tfelt	nan-album singles	Yes	Joo Hyo	Yes	Joo Hyo	No	No
2016	"Get It?" feat. Ha:tfelt, Cheetah	Younha	nan-album singles	Yes	Cheetah	Yes	Lee Woomin, Frants	No	No
2016	"Sweet & Easy"	Wonder Girls	Why So Lonely	Yes	Yubin	Yes	Yubin, Hong Jisang	No	No
2016	"Rainy Street" feat. Ha:tfelt	Babylon	Between Us	Yes	Babylon	Yes	Babylon, Groovy Room	No	No
2017	"Read Me" feat. Punchnello	Ha:tfelt	Meine	Yes	Punchnello	Yes	Woo-Min Lee 'collapsedone'	No	No
2017	"Draw Me"	Wonder Girls	nan-album singles	Yes	Yubin	No	No	No	No
2017	"Set Me Free"	Jeong Jinwoon	nan-album singles	Yes	Steve	No	No	No	No
2017	"Only You"	Twice	Signal	Yes	No	No	No	No	No
2018	"It's a Comfort (Pluhmm)"	Ha:tfelt	Deine	Yes	No	Yes	Woomin Lee 'collapsedone'	No	No
2018	"Cigar"	Ha:tfelt	Deine	Yes	No	Yes	Padi (pedi), Nutty	No	No
2020	"Life Sucks"	Ha:tfelt	1719	Yes	No	Yes	Woomin Lee 'collapsedone' Fredrik "Fredro"	No	No
2020	"Piercing" feat. Thama	Ha:tfelt	1719	Yes	No	Yes	Woomin Lee 'collapsedone'	No	No
2020	"My Book (Guitar Ver.)"	Ha:tfelt	1719	Yes	No	Yes	Woomin Lee 'collapsedone', Lou Page	No	No
2020	"Make Love"	Ha:tfelt	1719	Yes	No	Yes	Padi, Vendy, Nutty	No	No
2020	"Satellite" feat. Ash island	Ha:tfelt	1719	Yes	Ash island	Yes	Woomin Lee 'collapsedone'	No	No
2020	"Sweet Sensation" feat. Sole	Ha:tfelt	1719	Yes	Sole	Yes	Woomin Lee 'collapsedone'	No	No
2020	"Solitude"	Ha:tfelt	1719	Yes	No	Yes	G.QOO	No	No
2020	"3 Minutes" feat. Choiza	Ha:tfelt	1719	Yes	Choiza	Yes	FRANTS	No	No
2020	"Bluebird"	Ha:tfelt	1719	Yes	No	Yes	Godan	No	No
2020	"Sky Gray"	Ha:tfelt	1719	Yes	No	Yes	Woomin Lee "collapsedone"	No	No
2020	"How to love"	Ha:tfelt	1719	Yes	No	Yes	Woomin Lee "collapsedone"	No	No
2020	"Summertime" feat.Kim Hyo-eun	Ha:tfelt	Summertime	Yes	Kim Hyo-eun	Yes	Woomin Lee 'collapsedone'	No	No
2022	"Left"	Ha:tfelt	Left	Yes	No	Yes	G.QOO	No	No
2022	"Every Love"	Ha:tfelt	Left	Yes	No	Yes	G.QOO	No	No
2022	"FiNE!"	Ha:tfelt	Left	Yes	No	Yes	G.QOO	No	No
2022	"Tempo"	Ha:tfelt	Left	Yes	No	Yes	G.QOO	No	No

Source: Korea Music Copyright Association and Melon

== Filmography ==
=== Film ===
Year	Title	Role	Notes
2010	The Last Godfather	Herself	Cameo
2012	The Wonder Girls	Herself	

=== Television ===
Year	Title	Role	Notes
2012	Dream High 2	Herself	Cameo
2013	Basketball	Bong Soon	

=== Variety shows ===
Year	Title	Role	Notes/Ref.
2016	King of Mask Singer	Contestant	Episodes 79–80
2017	Cross Country	Cast member	
2022	The Black Sheep Game	Contestant	Episodes 1-4

== Musical theatre ==
Year	Title	Role	Notes
2011–2014	The Three Musketeers	Lady Constance Bonacieux	Lead role

== Awards and nominations ==
Year presented, name of the award ceremony, award category, nominated work and the result of the nomination
Year	Award	Category	Nominated work	Result
2015	24th Seoul Music Awards	Bonsang Award	Ain't Nobody	Nominated
2015	24th Seoul Music Awards	Popularity Award	Ain't Nobody	Nominated
2015	24th Seoul Music Awards	Hallyu Special Award	Ain't Nobody	Nominated
2015	24th Seoul Music Awards	Bonsang Award	No Make Up (with Gaeko & Zion.T)	Nominated
2015	24th Seoul Music Awards	Popularity Award	No Make Up (with Gaeko & Zion.T)	Nominated
2015	24th Seoul Music Awards	Hallyu Special Award	No Make Up (with Gaeko & Zion.T)	Nominated
2015	12th Korean Music Awards	Best Pop Song	Ain't Nobody	Nominated
2015	12th Korean Music Awards	Female Musician of the Year	—N/a	Won
