= Odd Eye Circle =

South Korean girl group

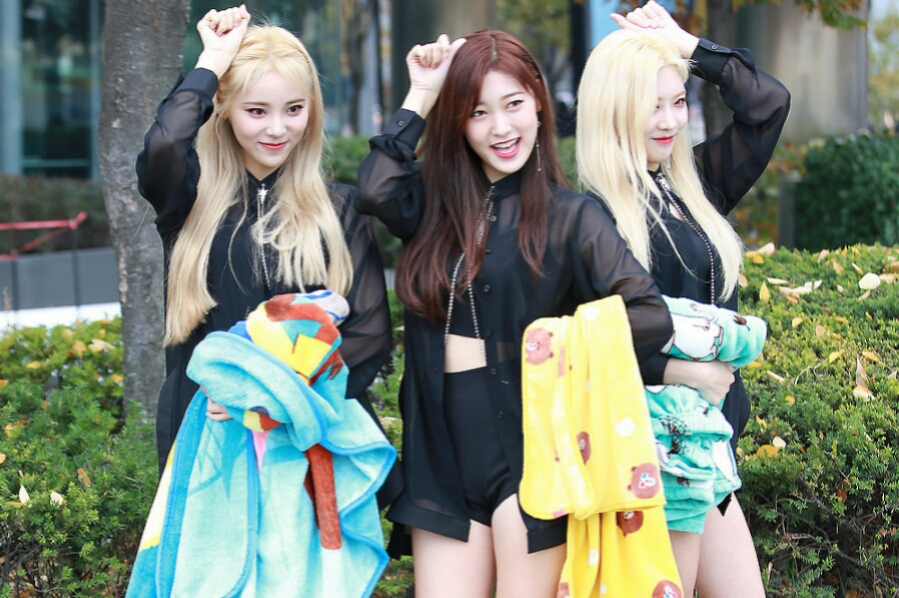
- Odd Eye Circle in November 2017; From left to right: Jinsoul, Choerry, and Kim Lip

Background information
- Origin: South Korea
- Genre: K-pop
- Years active: 2017; 2023–2024
- Labels: Blockberry Creative; Modhaus
- Spinoff of: Loona; Artms
- Members: Kim Lip; Jinsoul; Choerry

Odd Eye Circle (Korean: 오드 아이 써클; commonly stylized in all caps, or abbreviated as OEC) is a South Korean girl group, consisting of three members: Kim Lip, Jinsoul, and Choerry.

The trio originally formed as the second sub-unit of girl group Loona through their pre-debut project "Girl of the Month" and debuted on September 21, 2017, with their EP Mix & Match. Contracted at first with Blockberry Creative, the trio later signed with Modhaus after lawsuits against BlockBerry, resuming their activities with the release of their second EP <Version Up> on July 12, 2023.

== History ==
=== Pre-debut: Introducing the members ===
On May 11, 2017, the first member of Odd Eye Circle, Kim Lip, was revealed. She debuted with the single Kim Lip on May 23, 2017, with the title track "Eclipse".

The next member to be revealed was Jinsoul, who had previously been teased at through Vivi's music video for "Everyday I Need You". Jinsoul was officially revealed as the seventh member of Loona on June 13, 2017. She debuted with the single JinSoul on June 26, 2017, with the title track "Singing in the Rain".

On July 12, 2017, the last member of Odd Eye Circle and the youngest of the group, Choerry, was revealed. She debuted with the single Choerry with the title track "Love Cherry Motion" on July 28, 2017.

=== 2017: Debut with Mix & Match ===
A teaser titled "Reveal" was released on August 30, 2017, revealing Odd Eye Circle as the name of the sub-unit. On September 17, a teaser for their title track, "Girl Front", for their upcoming debut was released, and a day later the preview for their upcoming extended play, Mix & Match. The sub-unit officially debuted on September 21, 2017, with the release of their EP Mix & Match and a music video for "Girl Front". Their first music show appearance was on Mnet's M Countdown.

On September 23, the English version of one of their songs from Mix & Match, "Loonatic", was released with the music video.

On October 31, a reissue of their extended play Mix & Match titled Max & Match was released with the addition of two tracks and the new lead single "Sweet Crazy Love", along with its music video.

=== 2023–present: Resumption of activities with <Version Up> ===
On January 13, 2023, Odd Eye Circle, along with their bandmate Heejin, successfully terminated their exclusive contracts with Blockberry Creative after legal proceedings and signed exclusive contracts with Modhaus on March 17. On March 27, Modhaus reportedly filed an application to trademark the name Odd Eye Circle. On April 15, Modhaus introduced the trio as a part of their Artms project, alongside former bandmate Heejin, announcing this news with the members' individual teaser of <Version Up> from June 15 to 17. On June 19, Modhaus announced that the trio's comeback date would be on July 12, and that accompanying their new EP's release, they would embark on a four-stop tour across Europe in August. Ten days later, Modhaus confirmed that <Version Up> would be the title of their new EP, and on July 5 released the tracklist, revealing "Air Force One" as the lead single. Following the release of the EP and the music video for its lead single, Odd Eye Circle also held a showcase at Yes24 Live Hall on July 12.

On October 10, 2023, the trio announced "Song Gravity" through the Cosmo application, sharing plans to release an English version of their previous single "Air Force One", "Je Ne Sais Quoi", "Sweet Crazy Love", and "Girl Front", inviting fans to vote on which single would be released in the English version. "Sweet Crazy Love" (English ver.) won the vote and was released on November 24.

== Members ==
- Kim Lip (김립)
- Jinsoul (진솔)
- Choerry (최리)

== Discography ==
=== Extended plays ===
List of extended plays, with selected details, chart positions, and sales
Title	Details	Peak chart positions		Sales
Title	Details	KOR	US World	Sales
Mix & Match	Released: September 21, 2017; Label: BlockBerry Creative; Formats: CD, digital download, streaming	16	10	KOR: 7,869
<Version Up>	Released: July 12, 2023; Label: Modhaus; Formats: CD, digital download, streaming; Track listing: 1. "Did You Wait?" (기다렸어?); 2. "Air Force One"; 3. "Je Ne Sais Quoi"; 4. "Lucid"; 5. "Love Me Like"; 6. "My Secret Playlist"	6	—	KOR: 72,669
"—" denotes releases that did not chart.

=== Reissues ===
List of extended plays, with selected details, chart positions and sales
Title	Details	Peak chart positions		Sales
Title	Details	KOR	US World	Sales
Max & Match	Released: October 31, 2017; Label: BlockBerry Creative; Formats: CD, digital download, streaming	7	11	KOR: 11,136

=== Singles ===
List of singles, with selected chart positions, showing year released and album name
Title	Year	Peak chart positions		Album
Title	Year	KOR Down.	US World	Album
"Girl Front"	2017	—	—	Mix & Match
"Loonatic" (English ver.)	2017	—	—	Mix & Match
"Sweet Crazy Love"	2017	—	15	Max & Match
"Air Force One"	2023	60	—	<Version Up>
"Sweet Crazy Love" (English ver.)	2023	—	—	Non-album single
"—" denotes releases that did not chart.

== Videography ==
=== Music videos ===
Title	Year	Director(s)	Ref.
"Girl Front"	2017	Digipedi	
"Sweet Crazy Love"	2017	Digipedi	
"Air Force One"	2023	Chung Ki Youl (Postpattern)	

== Concert and tours ==
=== Headlining tours ===
Volume Up
Date	City	Country	Venue
Europe
August 5, 2023	London	England	O2 Forum Kentish Town
August 7, 2023	Berlin	Germany	Kesselhaus
August 9, 2023	Warsaw	Poland	Palladium
August 11, 2023	Paris	France	Salle Pleyel
North America
January 12, 2024	New York	United States	Town Hall
January 14, 2024	Orlando	United States	Hard Rock Live
January 17, 2024	Atlanta	United States	Buckhead Theatre
January 19, 2024	Houston	United States	Bayou Music Center
January 22, 2024	Fort Worth	United States	Will Rogers Auditorium
January 24, 2024	Tempe	United States	The Marquee
January 26, 2024	Los Angeles	United States	The Orpheum
January 29, 2024	San Francisco	United States	Palace of Fine Arts
February 1, 2024	Mexico City	Mexico	Auditorio BB
February 3, 2024	Monterrey	Mexico	Showcenter Complex
Asia
February 10, 2024	Tokyo	Japan	Zepp Shinjuku
