= Not Friends =

2021 promotional single by Loona

Promotional single by Loona
- Language: Korean
- Released: September 3, 2021
- Genre: Pop; acoustic rock; hip hop
- Length: 3:15
- Label: Big Ocean ENM; Kakao
- Lyricists: Kim Lip; Michelle Buzz; Myah Marie; Ryan S. Jhun; Tido; Youha
- Producer: Ryan S. Jhun

Special edition cover
- The special edition contains three new remixes of the song

Music video
- "Not Friends" on YouTube

"Not Friends" is a song by the South Korean girl group Loona. (Note: Only members Heejin, Kim Lip, Jinsoul, and Yves take part in the song, although Loona as a group is credited on the song.) It was released as the second song from Ryan Jhun's "Maxis By Ryan Jhun" project. Kim Lip is credited as a songwriter on the song making her the first Loona member to co-write a song for the group. The song peaked at number seven on the US World Digital Songs becoming the group's eighth top ten hit and also appeared on the Gaon Download Chart. On October 27 three new versions of the song were released along with the song's instrumental.

== Background ==
Jhun and Loona first announced the collaboration in August 2021, alongside several teaser images of the four members. The first teaser poster released featured the four members in pink set image. 'Keep Music Alive' was sprawled in bold letters across the teaser with the lyrics for the song revealed at the bottom. The cover for the single with a pink and green gun with the group's name on it was released on August 30. A 'project spoiler' where the behind-the-scenes of the group members at the recording was shared by Jhun the next day. A teaser for the music video was released a day before the song's release.

"Not Friends" is the second installment of the "MAXIS By Ryan Jhun" project, a collaboration between Jhun, Big Ocean ENM, and Kakao Entertainment which started in August with the single "Maniac" featuring NCT's Doyoung and Haechan.

== Composition ==
"Not Friends" mixes and meshes aspects of pop, acoustic rock, and hip hop. Lyrically, the song boldly expresses the wish to break down the barrier between friendship and romance.

== Music video ==
In the action-packed music video, the Loona members go up against each other in a fight to the end. JinSoul and HeeJin silently hunt one another down with sniper rifles, while Kim Lip and Yves take down hordes of armed fighters in their attempts to face-off in hand-to-hand combat.

== Track listing ==
- Digital single
1. "Not Friends" (Alawin remix) – 4:31
2. "Not Friends" (Tido remix) – 3:31
3. "Not Friends" (Orbit remix) – 3:28
4. "Not Friends" (Original mix) – 3:15
5. "Not Friends" (instrumental) – 3:15

== Charts ==
Weekly chart performance for "Not Friends"
Chart (2021)	Peak position
US World Digital Songs (Billboard)	7

== Release history ==
Release date and format for "Not Friends"
Region	Date	Format	Version	Label
Various	September 3, 2021	Digital download; streaming	Original	Big Ocean ENM; Kakao Entertainment
Various	October 27, 2021	CD	Original	Big Ocean ENM; Kakao Entertainment
Various	October 27, 2021	CD; Digital download; streaming	Alawn remix	Big Ocean ENM; Kakao Entertainment
Various	October 27, 2021	CD; Digital download; streaming	Tido remix	Big Ocean ENM; Kakao Entertainment
Various	October 27, 2021	CD; Digital download; streaming	Orbit remix	Big Ocean ENM; Kakao Entertainment
