= Go Won (single album) =

Single album by Loona
- Released: January 30, 2018
- Genre: Pop
- Length: 6:16
- Language: Korean
- Label: Blockberry Creative; Vlending Co., Ltd.; Windmill ENT

Loona chronology
| Chuu (2017) | Go Won (2018) | Olivia Hye (2018) |

Alternate cover
- Chuu & GoWon artwork

Music video
- "One&Only" on YouTube

Go Won (also known as Chuu & Go Won) is the eleventh single album from South Korean girl group Loona's pre-debut project. It was released digitally on January 30 and physically on January 31, 2018, by Blockberry Creative and distributed by Vlending Co., Ltd. and Windmill ENT. It officially introduces member Go Won and contains two tracks, one being a duet with Chuu featuring Kim Lip.

== Track listing ==
| No. | Title | Lyrics | Music | Arrangement | Length |
|---|---|---|---|---|---|
| 1. | "One & Only" (Go Won solo) | Park Ji-yeon (MonoTree) | Darren "BabyDeeBeats" Smith, Tammy | Darren "BabyDeeBeats" Smith | 2:55 |
| 2. | "See Saw" (Chuu and Go Won feat. Kim Lip) | moonc | moonc, Rhoyzk | moonc, Rhoyzk | 3:21 |
| Total length: | | | | | 6:16 |

== Charts ==
| Chart (2018) | Peak position |
|---|---|
| South Korean Albums (Gaon) | 13 |
