= Artms =

South Korean girl group

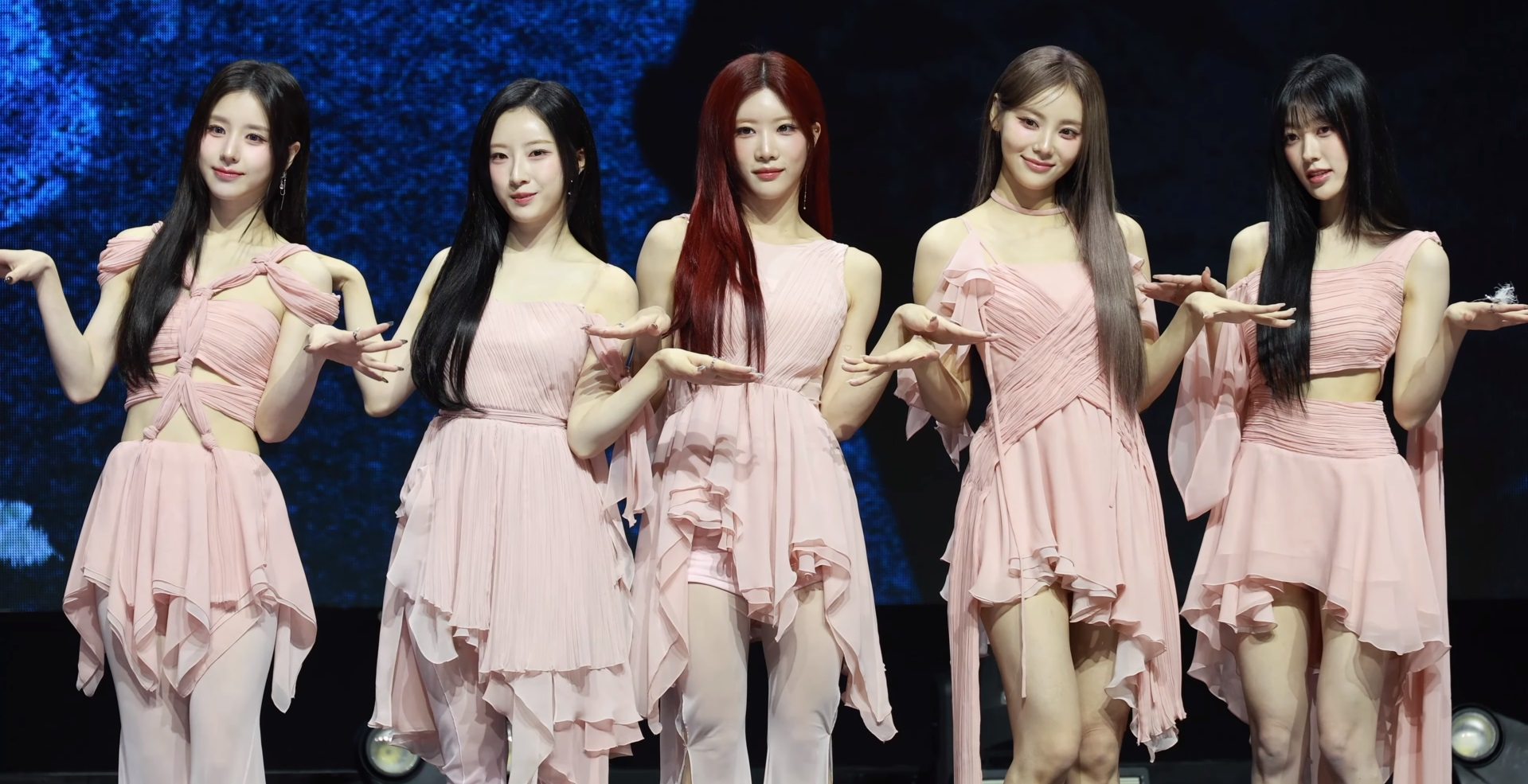
- Artms in June 2025: L–R: Heejin, Haseul, Kim Lip, Jinsoul, and Choerry

Background information
- Origin: Seoul, South Korea
- Genres: K-pop; pop
- Years active: 2023–present
- Label: Modhaus
- Spinoffs: Odd Eye Circle
- Spinoff of: Loona
- Members: Heejin; Haseul; Kim Lip; Jinsoul; Choerry
- Website: artms-strategy.com

Artms (/ˈɑːrtəmɪs/; Korean: 아르테미스; stylized in all caps) is a South Korean girl group formed by Modhaus. The group consists of five Loona members: Heejin, Haseul, Kim Lip, Jinsoul, and Choerry. They debuted on May 31, 2024, with the studio album DALL and its lead single "Virtual Angel".

== Name ==
The name Artms was inspired by the ancient Greek goddess of the Moon, named Artemis, as well as NASA's Artemis program, which intends to return to the Moon and land the first woman and person of color on it.

The group's name originally referred to a project by Modhaus in 2023 prior to the members' debut as a permanent group in May 2024.

== History ==
=== 2022–2023: Signing with Modhaus and Artms project ===
In November 2022, nine members of Loona, including the quintet, applied for a provisional injunction to suspend their exclusive contracts due to Chuu's removal from the group. On January 13, 2023, the exclusive contracts of Heejin, Kim Lip, Jinsoul, and Choerry were successfully terminated from Blockberry Creative. On March 17, the four Loona members signed exclusive contracts with Modhaus after their contracts with Blockberry Creative were terminated. On June 21, Haseul, another member of Loona, signed with Modhaus after her contract with Blockberry Creative was suspended.

On June 19, 2023, Modhaus announced that the trio Odd Eye Circle would return with their second extended play Version Up on July 12, as a part of the Artms project. On October 26, the solo single "Plastic Candy" by member Haseul was released. Her first small theater concert entitled Music Studio 81.8 Hz dated from October 26 to October 29. On October 31, member Heejin released her first EP K as a part of the Artms project. On December 1, Artms released the single "The Carol 3.0", a continuation of Loona's "The Carol" series and their first release as a five-member group. An English version of "The Carol 3.0" was released on December 11.

=== 2024–present: Debut with DALL ===
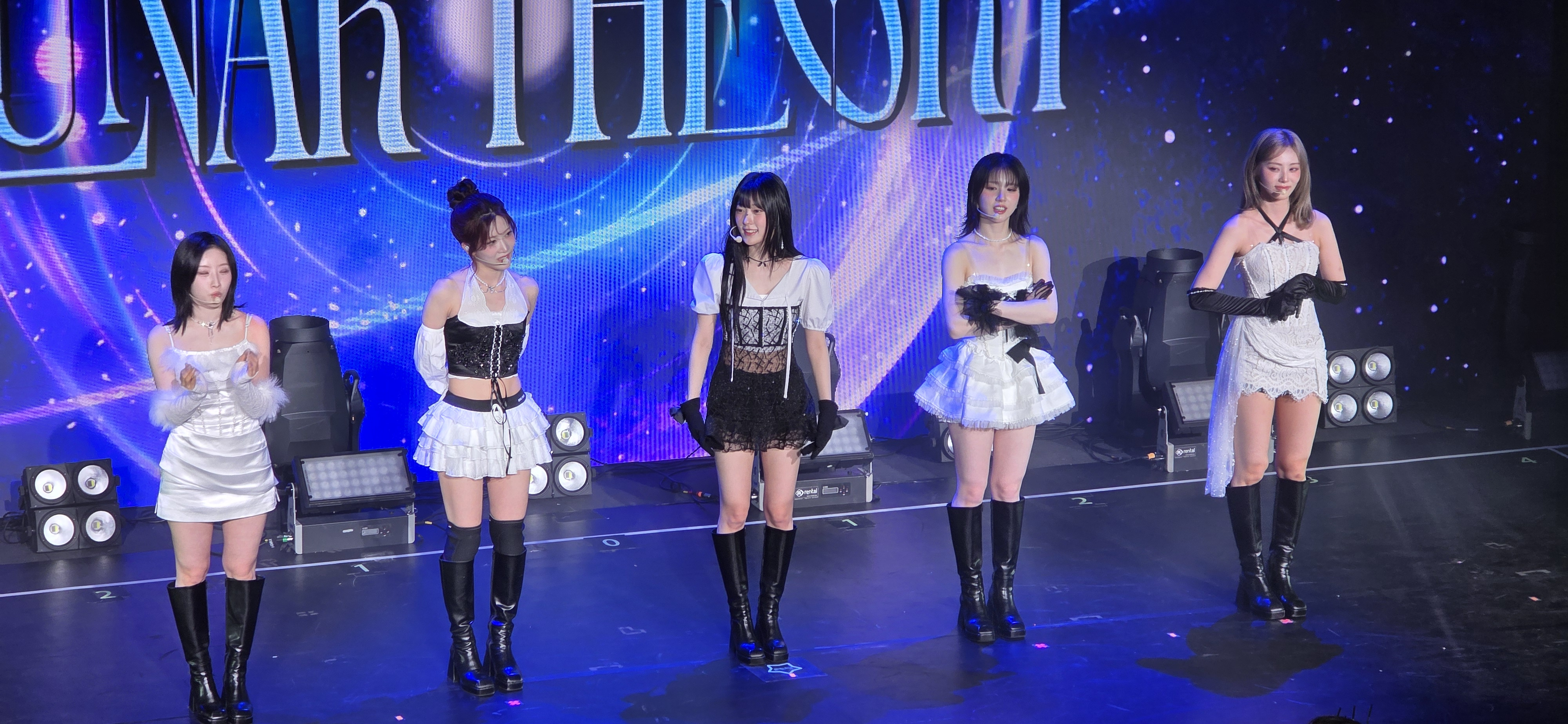
Artms performing in Eindhoven, the Netherlands, on May 3, 2025

On February 28, 2024, Artms announced their debut studio album DALL, which would be released on May 31 and preceded by four pre-release singles. The title of the album stands for "Devine All Love & Live", with devine, a key phrase on the album, intended as a twist on the word divine. On March 29, the first pre-release single "Birth" was released. On April 1, Modhaus announced that Artms would be holding their world tour titled Moonshot. The remaining three pre-release singles "Flower Rhythm", "Candy Crush", and "Air" for DALL were released on April 11, April 25, and May 10 respectively. The lead single "Virtual Angel" was released together with the album on May 31, marking the group's official debut. "Birth" was listed on Dazed's "The 50 best K-pop tracks of 2024", and "Virtual Angel" was listed on Billboard's "The 25 best K-Pop songs of 2024". On June 20, HeeJin, Kim Lip, JinSoul and Choerry won their case against Blockberry Creative over the non-existence of their exclusive contracts. From July to November, Artms embarked on their first world tour.

In March 2025, Artms embarked on their second world tour, Lunar Theory, with dates in South Korea, North America and Europe. On April 4, the group released the single "Burn". On June 13, Artms released their first extended play Club Icarus, with the lead single "Icarus". The group promoted the album at special club events in Seoul, New York, and Los Angeles, with the United States stops being referred to as Club Icarus: The Global Chapter. On July 7, the group performed at Waterbomb festival in Seoul.

In July 2026, it was announced that Artms would be releasing a new EP titled Hyper-Ego on August 7. The lead single "Born Stunner" was released on July 24. The group embarked on a world tour to promote the EP in October, with exception of member Haseul who was recovering from shoulder surgery.

== Members ==
- Heejin (희진)
- Haseul (하슬)
- Kim Lip (김립)
- Jinsoul (진솔)
- Choerry (최리)

== Discography ==
=== Studio albums ===
List of studio albums, showing selected details, selected chart positions, and sales
Title	Details	Peak chart positions		Sales
Title	Details	KOR	US World	Sales
DALL	Released: May 31, 2024; Label: Modhaus, The Orchard; Formats: CD, digital download, streaming	7	7	KOR: 112,605

=== Extended plays ===
List of extended plays, showing selected details, selected chart positions, and sales
Title	Details	Peak chart positions		Sales
Title	Details	KOR	US World	Sales
Club Icarus	Released: June 13, 2025; Label: Modhaus; Formats: CD, digital download, streaming; Track listing: 1. "Club for the Broken"; 2. "Icarus"; 3. "Obsessed"; 4. "Goddess"; 5. "Verified Beauty"; 6. "Burn"	6	12	KOR: 152,572
Hyper-Ego	Released: August 7, 2026; Label: Modhaus; Formats: CD, digital download, streaming; Track listing: 1. "From Wings to Soul"; 2. "Born Stunner"; 3. "Blue Blood"; 4. "Icarus Gang"; 5. "Hyper Crush"; 6. "Pixel Memory"	9	—	KOR: 77,949

=== Single albums ===
List of single albums, showing selected details
Title	Details	Peak chart positions	Sales
Title	Details	KOR	Sales
The Carol 3.0	Released: December 1, 2023; Label: Modhaus; Formats: Digital download, streaming; Track listing: 1. "The Carol 3.0"; 2. "The Carol 3.0" (English version)	—	—N/a
Burn	Released: April 4, 2025; Label: Modhaus; Formats: Digital download, streaming; Track listing: 1. "Light It Up"; 2. "Burn"	10	KOR: 29,142
"—" denotes releases that did not chart or were not released in that region.

=== Singles ===
List of singles, showing year released, selected chart positions, and name of the album
Title	Year	Peak chart positions		Album
Title	Year	KOR Down.	US World	Album
"The Carol 3.0"	2023	—	—	The Carol 3.0
"Birth"	2024	157	—	DALL
"Flower Rhythm"	2024	158	—	DALL
"Candy Crush"	2024	138	—	DALL
"Air"	2024	164	—	DALL
"Virtual Angel"	2024	73	9	DALL
"Burn"	2025	159	—	Burn
"Icarus"	2025	21	—	Club Icarus
"Born Stunner"	2026	92	—	Hyper-Ego
"Blue Blood"	2026	77	—	Hyper-Ego
"—" denotes releases that did not chart or were not released in that region.

=== Other charted songs ===
Title	Year	Peak chart positions	Album
Title	Year	KOR Down.	Album
"Sparkle"	2024	156	DALL
"The Hitchhiker's Guide To The Galaxy" (은하수를 여행하는 히치하이커를 위한 안내서)	2024	159	DALL
"Unf/Air"	2024	188	DALL
"Distress" (조난)	2024	194	DALL
"Butterfly Effect"	2024	172	DALL
"Club for the Broken"	2025	163	Club Icarus
"Obsessed"	2025	152	Club Icarus
"Goddess"	2025	151	Club Icarus
"Verified Beauty"	2025	150	Club Icarus
"From Wings To Soul"	2026	181	Hyper-Ego
"Icarus Gang"	2026	171	Hyper-Ego
"Hyper Crush"	2026	163	Hyper-Ego
"Pixel Memory"	2026	153	Hyper-Ego

== Videography ==
=== Music videos ===
List of music videos, showing year released, and name of the director(s)
Title	Year	Director(s)	Ref.
"Birth"	2024	Digipedi	
"Virtual Angel"	2024	Digipedi	
"Virtual Angel" (Human eye ver.)	2024	Digipedi	
"Unf/Air"	2024	Artms	
"Burn"	2025	Digipedi	
"Icarus" (Cinematic ver.)	2025	Digipedi	
"Icarus" (Club ver.)	2025	Digipedi	
"Born Stunner"	2026	Digipedi	

=== Other videos ===
List of other videos, showing year released, and name of the director(s)
Title	Year	Director(s)	Ref.
"'Flower Rhythm' Track Video"	2024	Netsomware	
"'Candy Crush' Track Video"	2024	Netsomware	
"'Air' Track Video"	2024	Netsomware	

== Concert and tours ==
=== Headlining tours ===
==== 2024: Artms World Tour <Moonshot> ====
Date	City	Country	Venue
Asia
July 20, 2024	Seoul	South Korea	Ewha Woman's University Samsung Hall
July 21, 2024	Seoul	South Korea	Ewha Woman's University Samsung Hall
July 27, 2024	Yokohama	Japan	KT Zepp Yokohama
North America
August 16, 2024	New York	United States	Kings Theatre
August 19, 2024	Atlanta	United States	Tabernacle
August 21, 2024	Fort Lauderdale	United States	Broward Center for the Performing Arts
August 23, 2024	Orlando	United States	Walt Disney Theater
August 25, 2024	Houston	United States	Bayou Music Center
August 27, 2024	Dallas	United States	Music Hall at Fair Park
August 29, 2024	Phoenix	United States	The Van Buren
August 31, 2024	Los Angeles	United States	The Orpheum Theatre
September 3, 2024	San Francisco	United States	Warfield Theatre
September 5, 2024	Tacoma	United States	Pantages Theater
September 8, 2024	Minneapolis	United States	Uptown Theater
September 10, 2024	Chicago	United States	Copernicus Center
Latin America
September 14, 2024	Santiago	Chile	Teatro Teletón
September 17, 2024	São Paulo	Brazil	Terra SP
September 20, 2024	Bogotá	Colombia	Royal Center
September 22, 2024	Mexico City	Mexico	Auditorio BB
Europe
October 11, 2024	Helsinki	Finland	Kulttuuritalo
October 13, 2024	Warsaw	Poland	Progresja
October 15, 2024	Cologne	Germany	Carlswerk Victoria
October 17, 2024	Berlin	Germany	Huxley's Neue Welt
October 20, 2024	Paris	France	Salle Pleyel
October 23, 2024	London	United Kingdom	Indigo at The O2
October 26, 2024	Barcelona	Spain	Sala Razzmatazz
Australia
November 12, 2024	Brisbane	Australia	The Tivoli
November 14, 2024	Melbourne	Australia	170 Russell
November 17, 2024	Sydney	Australia	Liberty Hall
Asia
November 24, 2024	Macau	China	Macau Fisherman's Wharf Convention And Exhibition Center

==== 2025: Artms World Tour <Lunar Theory> ====
Date	City	Country	Venue
Asia
March 22, 2025	Seoul	South Korea	Ewha Womans University Samsung Hall
March 23, 2025	Seoul	South Korea	Ewha Womans University Samsung Hall
North America
March 28, 2025	Chicago	United States	Copernicus Center
March 31, 2025	Indianapolis	United States	Egyptian Room
April 2, 2025	Detroit	United States	The Fillmore
April 4, 2025	New York	United States	Town Hall
April 6, 2025	Richmond	United States	Dominion Energy Center
April 8, 2025	St Petersburg	United States	Mahaffey Theater
April 10, 2025	Houston	United States	Bayou Music Center
April 13, 2025	Los Angeles	United States	Wilshire Ebell Theater
April 16, 2025	San Francisco	United States	Palace of Fine Arts
April 18, 2025	Tacoma	United States	Pantages Theater
April 20, 2025	Vancouver	Canada	Vogue Theatre
Europe
May 1, 2025	London	United Kingdom	Troxy
May 3, 2025	Eindhoven	Netherlands	Effenaar
May 5, 2025	Paris	France	Salle Pleyel
May 8, 2025	Milan	Italy	Santeria Toscana 31
May 11, 2025	Copenhagen	Denmark	Amager Bio
May 14, 2025	Warsaw	Poland	Progresja

==== 2025: Artms World Tour <Grand Club Icarus> ====
Date	City	Country	Venue
North America
November 6, 2025	Baltimore	United States	The Lyric Baltimore
November 8, 2025	Medford	United States	Chevalier Theatre
November 10, 2025	Toronto	Canada	Danforth Music Hall
November 12, 2025	Madison	United States	The Orpheum Theater
November 14, 2025	St. Louis	United States	The Factory
November 17, 2025	Fort Lauderdale	United States	The Parker
November 19, 2025	Atlanta	United States	Center Stage
November 22, 2025	Denver	United States	Fillmore Auditorium
November 24, 2025	Tempe	United States	Marquee Theatre
November 26, 2025	Los Angeles	United States	Wilshire Ebell Theatre
November 28, 2025	Monterey	United States	Golden State Theater
Latin America
December 1, 2025	Santiago	Chile	Theatro Caupolicán
December 3, 2025	Buenos Aires	Argentina	C Art Media
December 5, 2025	São Paulo	Brazil	Komplexo Tempo
December 7, 2025	Mexico City	Mexico	La Maraka
Europe
January 13, 2026	London	United Kingdom	O2 Forum Kentish Town
January 15, 2026	Paris	France	Bataclan
January 17, 2026	Cologne	Germany	Kantine
January 19, 2026	Munich	Germany	Backstage Werk
January 21, 2026	Helsinki	Finland	House of Culture
January 23, 2026	Warsaw	Poland	Palladium
Asia
February 7, 2026	Seoul	South Korea	Ewha Womans University Samsung Hall
February 8, 2026	Seoul	South Korea	Ewha Womans University Samsung Hall
March 28, 2026	Macau	China	G Box

==== 2026: Artms World Tour <Art of Blue Blood> ====
Date	City	Country	Venue
Asia
September 5, 2026	Seoul	South Korea	Yes24 Live Hall
September 6, 2026	Seoul	South Korea	Yes24 Live Hall
North America
October 5, 2026	Toronto	Canada	Danforth Music Hall
October 7, 2026	New York	United States	Webster Hall
October 10, 2026	Orlando	United States	The Plaza Live
October 13, 2026	Grand Prairie	United States	Texas Trust CU Theatre
October 15, 2026	Denver	United States	Summit Music Hall
October 18, 2026	Los Angeles	United States	The United Theater on Broadway
October 20, 2026	San Francisco	United States	The Regency Ballroom
October 23, 2026	Las Vegas	United States	House of Blues Las Vegas
October 25, 2026	Seattle	United States	Showbox SoDo
October 27, 2026	Vancouver	Canada	Vogue Theatre
Europe
November 16, 2026	Lille	France	Théâtre Sébastopol
November 19, 2026	Maastricht	Netherlands	Muziekgieterij
November 20, 2026	Arnhem	Netherlands	Musis Arnhem
November 22, 2026	Helsinki	Finland	House of Culture
November 25, 2026	Berlin	Germany	Kesselhaus
November 27, 2026	Warsaw	Poland	Palladium
November 29, 2026	Budapest	Hungary	Dürer Kert
December 1, 2026	Bucharest	Romania	Aula Magna
Asia
January 3, 2027	Taipei	China	Zepp New Taipei

== Awards and nominations ==
Name of the award ceremony, year presented, award category, nominee(s) and the result of the award
Award ceremony	Year	Category	Nominee/work	Result	Ref.
Hanteo Music Awards	2024	Emerging Artist	Artms	Won	
Hanteo Music Awards	2025	Emerging Artist	Artms	Won	

=== Listicles ===
Publication	List	Nominee/work	Placement	Ref.
Dazed	The 30 Best K-pop Tracks of 2025	"Obsessed"	Placed	
NME	The 25 Best K-pop Songs of 2025	"Icarus"	15	
