= As Time Goes =

Single by Jinsoul

from the album Meow, the Secret Boy (Original Television Soundtrack)
- Released: April 15, 2020
- Length: 3:06
- Label: Donuts Music N; Dreamus
- Songwriter: Jay Lee
- Producer: Jay Lee

Jinsoul singles chronology
"Singing in the Rain" (2017)	"As Time Goes" (2020)	"Ring of Chaos" (2025)

Music video
- "As Time Goes" Video on YouTube

"As Time Goes" (Korean: 시간은 한 바퀴 돌아; RR: Siganeun han bakwi dora) is a song recorded by South Korean singer Jinsoul for the soundtrack of the drama series Welcome. It was released as a digital single on April 15, 2020, by Donuts Music N and Dreamus.

== Lyrics ==
"As Time Goes" was composed by Jay Lee who wrote songs for Hotel Del Luna and Secret Mother. He said in an interview that "Jinsoul's sad/melancholy voice would stimulate the listeners' emotions."

== Track listing ==
No.	Title	Lyrics	Music	Length
1.	"As Time Goes" (시간은 한 바퀴 돌아)	Jay Lee	Jay Lee	3:07
2.	"As Time Goes" (Inst.)		Jay Lee	3:07
Total length:				6:14

== Commercial performance ==
The song reached number one on iTunes in 30 countries including Turkey, Singapore, Saudi Arabia, The Philippines, Finland, Chile, Vietnam, Malaysia, Colombia, Argentina, Thailand, Brazil and Mexico. The song also debuted at number two on Billboard's World Digital Songs Sale Chart.

== Charts ==
Chart (2020)	Peak position
US World Digital Songs (Billboard)	2
