= Mix & Match (EP) =

2017 extended play by Odd Eye Circle

- Digital and Normal cover

EP by Odd Eye Circle / Loona
- Released: September 21, 2017
- Genres: Dance-pop; alternative R&B; future bass
- Length: 14:21
- Language: Korean
- Labels: Blockberry Creative; Vlending Co., Ltd.; Windmill ENT

Odd Eye Circle / Loona chronology
Choerry (2017)	Mix & Match (2017)	Version Up (2023)

Loona chronology
Choerry (2017)	Mix & Match (2017)	Yves (2017)

Singles from Mix & Match
- 1. "Girl Front" Released: September 21, 2017; 2. "Loonatic" Released: October 23, 2017

Alternative artwork

Music video
- "Girl Front” on YouTube

Max & Match
- Digital and Limited cover

EP (Reissue) by Odd Eye Circle
- Released: October 31, 2017
- Genre: Pop
- Length: 25:29
- Language: Korean
- Labels: Blockberry Creative; Vlending Co., Ltd.; Windmill ENT

Singles from Max & Match
- 1. "Sweet Crazy Love" Released: October 31, 2017

Alternative artwork
- Normal cover

Music video
- "Sweet Crazy Love” on YouTube

Mix & Match is the debut extended play of South Korean girl group Odd Eye Circle (at the time a subgroup of Loona). It was released on September 21, 2017. The EP consists of five tracks, including the lead single, "Girl Front".

== Promotion and release ==
The group began teasing the album on September 9, 2017, by releasing photos of the group and individual shots of the members for the following 4 days. The album details were released on September 14, 2017, along with a confirmation of the release date and the track listing. This was followed by more teaser images, and previews of the music video and album songs on September 18 and 19 respectively through the group's official YouTube channel.

The album was released on September 21, 2017, as well as the official music video for "Girl Front", at 14:00 KST. This is also when the unit began promoting on various music shows.

== Track listing ==
No.	Title	Lyrics	Music	Length
1.	"Odd"	G-high (MonoTree)	Ollipop, Hayley Aitken	0:45
2.	"Girl Front"	박지연, 황현 (MonoTree), Jaden Jeong	Ollipop, Hayley Aitken	3:16
3.	"Loonatic"	G-High (MonoTree)	G-High, 김유석 (MonoTree)	3:00
4.	"Chaotic"	Artronic Waves, Safira.K, David Kate	Artronic Waves, David Kater	3:59
5.	"Starlight"	GDLO, 박지연 (MonoTree)	Hyuk Shin (Joombas), NOPARI (MonoTree), JJ Evans (Joombas)	3:21
Total length:				14:21

Max & Match reissue
No.	Title	Lyrics	Music	Length
1.	"Add"		NOPARI, GDLO, 황현 (MonoTree)	1:05
2.	"Sweet Crazy Love"	박지연 (MonoTree)	Daniel Kim, Charli Taft, Thomas Sardorff, G-high (MonoTree)	3:30
3.	"Uncover"	G-high (MonoTree)	G-high (MonoTree)	3:20
4.	"Girl Front"	박지연, 황현 (MonoTree), Jaden Jeong	Ollipop, Hayley Aitken	3:16
5.	"Loonatic"	G-High (MonoTree)	G-High, 김유석 (MonoTree)	3:00
6.	"Chaotic"	Artronic Waves, Safira.K, David Kate	Artronic Waves, David Kater	3:59
7.	"Starlight"	GDLO, 박지연 (MonoTree)	Hyuk Shin (Joombas), NOPARI (MonoTree), JJ Evans (Joombas)	3:21
8.	"Odd Front"	박지연, 황현 (MonoTree)	Ollipop, Hayley Aitken	3:46
Total length:				25:29

== Charts ==
=== Mix & Match ===
Chart (2017)	Peak position	Sales
South Korean Albums (Gaon)	16	7,869
US World Albums (Billboard)	10	7,869

=== Max & Match ===
Chart (2017)	Peak position	Sales
South Korean Albums (Gaon)	7	11,136
US World Albums (Billboard)	11	11,136

Odd Eye Circle
Kim Lip; JinSoul; Choerry
Reissue	Max & Match
Extended plays	Mix & Match; Version Up
Single albums	"Girl Front"; "Loonatic" (English ver.); "Sweet Crazy Love"; "Air Force One"
Concert tours	Loonatheworld Tour
Related topics	Blockberry Creative; Queendom 2
Discography
Category	Commons
