= Kim Lip (single album) =

- Digital and Version A cover

Single album by Loona
- Released: May 23, 2017
- Genres: Pop; R&B
- Length: 6:57
- Language: Korean
- Labels: Blockberry Creative; CJ E&M

Loona chronology
ViVi (2017)	Kim Lip (2017)	JinSoul (2017)

Alternative cover
- Version B artwork

Music video
- "Eclipse” on YouTube

Kim Lip is the sixth single album from South Korean girl group Loona's pre-debut project. It was released digitally on May 23 and physically on May 26, 2017, by Blockberry Creative and distributed by CJ E&M. It introduces member Kim Lip and contains two solo tracks, "Eclipse" and "Twilight".

== Promotion and release ==
In a post to the group's official Facebook account on May 17, 2017, Kim Lip's single album was described as "a glance at a new side of the Loonaverse," citing a new style of production from the other members' prior releases. The single albums were released monthly by each Loona member under the series name Girl of the Month (Korean: 이달의 소녀; RR: idal-ui sonyeo)

== Track listing ==
No.	Title	Lyrics	Music	Arrangement	Length
1.	"Eclipse" (Kim Lip solo)	Park Ji-yeon, Hwang Hyun (MonoTree)	Daniel Obi Klein, Charli Taft	Daniel Obi Klein, Charli Taft	3:50
2.	"Twilight" (Kim Lip solo)	Kim Taeseong, Lee Ji-eun (Iconic Sounds)	Cha Cha Malone, Kim Taeseong, Song Ji-eun	Cha Cha Malone	3:07
Total length:					6:57

== Charts ==
Chart	Peak position	Sales
South Korea Gaon Weekly Album Chart	13	13,320
South Korea Gaon Monthly Album Chart	51	13,320
