= Choerry =

South Korean singer (born 2001)

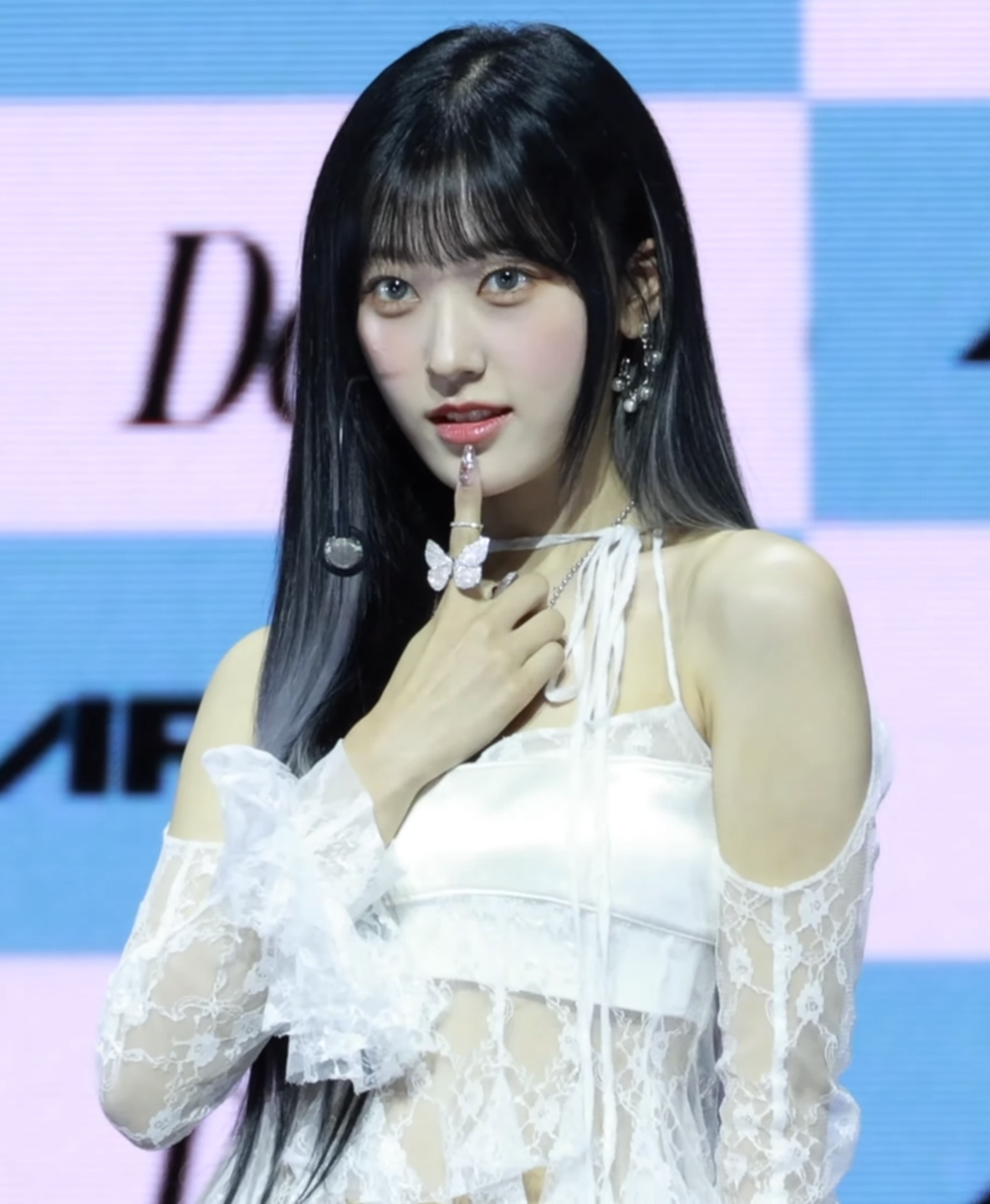
- Choerry in 2024
- Born: Choi Ye-rim; June 4, 2001 (age 25); Bucheon, Gyeonggi, South Korea
- Occupation: Singer
- Musical career
- Genres: K-pop; electropop
- Instrument: Vocals
- Years active: 2017–present
- Labels: Blockberry Creative; Modhaus
- Member of: Loona; Odd Eye Circle; Artms

Korean name
- Hangul: 최예림
- RR: Choe Yerim
- MR: Ch'oe Yerim

Stage name
- Hangul: 최리
- RR: Choeri
- MR: Ch'oeri

Choi Ye-rim (Korean: 최예림; born June 4, 2001), known professionally as Choerry (최리), is a South Korean singer. She is a member of Loona, sub-unit Odd Eye Circle, and a current member of Artms.

== Early life ==
Choi Ye-rim was born on June 4, 2001, in Bucheon, Gyeonggi Province, South Korea. In 2009, her second year of elementary school, Choerry made her first television appearance on MBC's Fantastic Mates.

In 2020, she graduated from Sungshin Girls' High School.

== Career ==
=== 2017–2022: Debut with Loona and solo activities ===
On July 12, 2017, Choerry was introduced as the eighth member of Loona. Then, she released her self-titled single album on July 28 with "Love Cherry Motion" as the lead single. On August 30, it was revealed that she would debut in Loona's second sub-unit, Odd Eye Circle. On September 21, the sub-unit debuted with their EP Mix & Match.

On December 13, Choerry released "The Carol 2.0", a re-recording of "The Carol" from HaSeul, with fellow Loona members ViVi and Yves.

On August 20, 2018, Choerry officially debuted with Loona as a full group through the release of their debut EP [+ +].

On October 23, 2020, Choerry was featured in A-FLOW's song titled "You". In 2021, Loona members YeoJin, Kim Lip, Go Won, and Choerry collaborated with children's television show Cocomong to release the singles "Yum-Yum" and "Yummy-Yummy".

=== 2023–present: Re-debut with Artms and solo activities ===
On January 13, 2023, Choerry and fellow Loona members Heejin, Kim Lip, and Jinsoul were granted preliminary injunctions to suspend their exclusive contracts with Blockberry Creative. On March 17, Choerry signed an exclusive contract with Modhaus, a label founded by the former Loona creative director Jaden Jeong. On April 1, Choerry was announced as a member of the Modhaus project Artms alongside Heejin, Kim Lip, and Jinsoul, which would later debut as a girl group also including Loona member Haseul. On June 20, Choerry won her case against Blockberry Creative over the non-existence of her exclusive contract.

On July 12, Kim Lip, Jinsoul, and Choerry released a second extended play, <Version Up> , as Odd Eye Circle under Modhaus.

On October 30, 2025, Choerry released her first single in over eight years, "Pressure", under Modhaus, with an accompanying music video. This release followed the releases of Kim Lip's "Can You Entertain" and Jinsoul's "Ring of Chaos", completing the Odd Eye Circle solo releases ahead of their Grand Club Icarus tour.

== Discography ==
=== Singles ===
Title	Year	Album
"Love Cherry Motion" (Note: credited to Loona, but the track is a solo by Choerry)	2017	Choerry
"Pressure"	2025	Non-album single

=== As featured artist ===
Title	Year	Album
"You" (A-FLOW featuring Choerry)	2020	Non-album single

== Videography ==
=== Music videos ===
List of music videos, showing year released, and name of the director(s)
Title	Year	Director(s)	Ref.
"Pressure"	2025	Digipedi	

== Filmography ==
=== Web series ===
Year	Title	Role	Ref.
2018	Do You Remember When We First Met?	Choi Yerim	
