= Choerry (single album) =

Single album by Loona
- Released: July 28, 2017
- Genre: Pop
- Length: 7:26
- Language: Korean
- Labels: Blockberry Creative; Vlending; Windmill ENT

Loona chronology
JinSoul (2017)	Choerry (2017)	Mix & Match (2017)

Loona pre-debut single album chronology
JinSoul (2017)	Choerry (2017)	Yves (2017)

Alternative cover
- JinSoul & Choerry artwork

Music video
- "Love Cherry Motion” on YouTube

Choerry (also known as JinSoul & Choerry) is the eighth single album from South Korean girl group Loona's pre-debut project. It was released digitally on July 28 and physically on July 31, 2017, by Blockberry Creative and distributed by Vlending Co., Ltd. It officially introduces the member Choerry and contains two tracks, Choerry's solo "Love Cherry Motion" and a duet with previously introduced member JinSoul called "Puzzle".

== Track listing ==
No.	Title	Lyrics	Music	Arrangement	Length
1.	"Love Cherry Motion" (Choerry solo)	Hwang Hyun, Shin Agnes (MonoTree)	Ollipop, Hayley Aitken, Kanata Okajima	Ollipop, Hayley Aitken	3:42
2.	"Puzzle" (JinSoul and Choerry duet)	Park Ji-yeon, G-High (MonoTree)	Daniel 'Obi' Klein, Charli Taft, Andreas Oberg	Daniel 'Obi' Klein, Charli Taft	3:44
Total length:					7:26

== Charts ==
Chart	Peak position	Sales
South Korea Gaon Weekly Album Chart	9	10,675
South Korea Gaon Monthly Album Chart	38	10,675
