= Modhaus =

South Korean record label

- Native name: 모드하우스
- Industry: Music
- Genre: K-Pop
- Founded: November 30, 2021
- Founder: Jaden Jeong; Joseph Baek
- Headquarters: Seoul, South Korea
- Key people: Jaden Jeong (Co-founder, president and CEO); Joseph Baek (Co-founder and Executive VP); Tae-Hyuk Kim (Head of Management); Sung-Woo Kim (A&R Manager)
- Website: mod-haus.com

Modhaus (Korean: 모드하우스; stylized as ModHaus) is a South Korean record label. The label manages K-pop groups TripleS, Odd Eye Circle, Artms, and upcoming group Idntt.

== History ==
Modhaus was founded on November 30, 2021 by ex-Blockberry Creative executive Jaden Jeong and ex-Playlist Studio COO Joseph Baek.

=== TripleS ===
On February 18, 2022, Modhaus announced their plans to create the first "fan-participating girl group", where fans would have a say in the group's creative processes. Their first group, Acid Angel from Asia, a four-member sub-unit of the then upcoming group TripleS, debuted on October 28, 2022. From 2023 up to the group's full debut in 2024, Modhaus continued to debut new sub-units of TripleS, including Krystal Eyes, Acid Eyes, Lovelution, Evolution, NXT, and Aria. TripleS debuted as a full 24-member group on May 8, 2024. Modhaus has since debuted sub-units Glow and Visionary Vision in 2024. Modhaus has announced plans for 6 new sub-units to debut in 2025: the first Japanese sub-unit Hatchi, a touring sub-unit Alphie, Moon, Sun, Neptune, and Zenith.

=== Odd Eye Circle and Artms ===
Modhaus co-founder and CEO Jaden Jeong served as the Creative Director to girl group Loona from 2016 to 2019. In November 2022, 9 Loona members, including Heejin, Haseul, Kim Lip, Jinsoul, and Choerry, applied for a provisional injunction to suspend their exclusive contracts. On March 17, Heejin, Kim Lip, Jinsoul, and Choerry signed exclusive contracts with Modhaus after their contracts with Blockberry Creative were terminated. On June 21, Haseul signed with Modhaus after her contract with Blockberry Creative was suspended.

On July 12, 2023, Odd Eye Circle, composed of Kim Lip, Jinsoul, and Choerry, who were originally a sub-unit in Loona, released their second EP <Version Up> under Modhaus. On October 26, Haseul debuted as a solo artist with her digital single "Plastic Candy". On October 31, Heejin debuted as a solo artist with the EP K. On May 31, 2024, Artms officially debuted as a group with their debut album DALL. In October 2025, Kim Lip, Jinsoul, and Choerry debuted as solo artists, each releasing a digital single.

=== Idntt ===
On May 10, 2024, days after the full 24-member debut TripleS, Modhaus announced plans to debut a "male version" of the group. On April 24, 2025, Modhaus revealed the groups name would be Idntt. On July 1, Modhaus announced plans to debut 24 members of the group in three stages of eight boys each as the sub-units Uneverm8t, Yesw8are, and Itsnotov8r. The first sub-unit, Uneverm8t, debuted on August 11 with seven members instead of the planned eight. The second sub-unit, Yesw8are, debuted on January 5, 2026 with eight members. The third sub-unit, Itsnot5ver, debuted with five members on July 13. The final four members of Idntt were revealed on November 5, with fans participating in the selection process.

== Artists ==
- TripleS
  - Acid Angel from Asia
  - Krystal Eyes
  - Acid Eyes
  - Lovelution
  - Evolution
  - NXT
  - Aria
  - Glow
  - Visionary Vision
  - Hatchi
  - Alphie
  - Moon
  - Sun
  - Neptune
  - Zenith
- Odd Eye Circle
- Artms
  - HeeJin
  - HaSeul
  - Kim Lip
  - JinSoul
  - Choerry
- Idntt (Upcoming)
  - Uneverm8t
  - Yesw8are
  - Itsnot5ver
