= Kim Lip =

South Korean singer (born 1999)

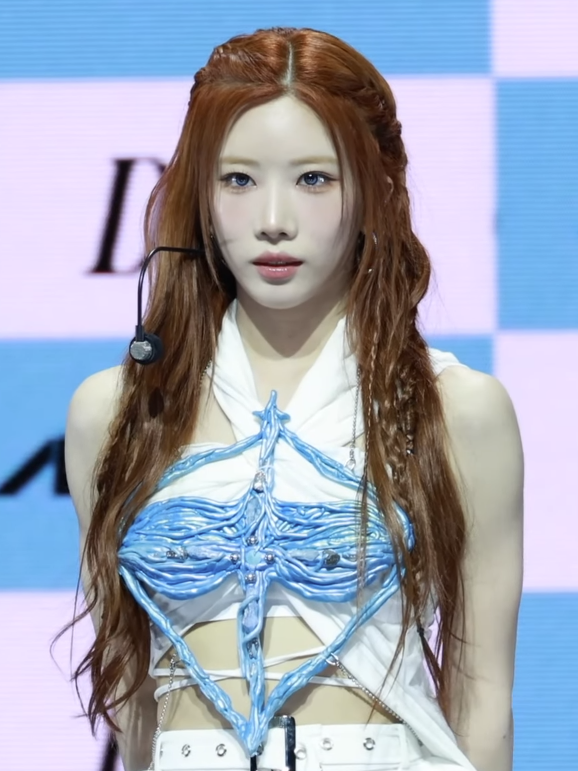
- Kim Lip in 2024
- Born: Kim Jung-eun; February 10, 1999 (age 27); Cheongju, South Korea
- Education: Hanlim Multi Art School
- Occupation: Singer
- Musical career
- Genre: K-pop
- Instrument: Vocals
- Years active: 2017–present
- Labels: Blockberry Creative; Modhaus
- Member of: Loona; Odd Eye Circle; Artms

Korean name
- Hangul: 김정은
- RR: Gim Jeongeun
- MR: Kim Chŏngŭn

Stage name
- Hangul: 김립
- RR: Gim Rip
- MR: Kim Rip

Kim Jung-eun (Korean: 김정은; born February 10, 1999), known professionally as Kim Lip (김립), is a South Korean singer. She is a member of Loona, leader of its sub-unit Odd Eye Circle, and member of Artms.

== Early life ==
Kim Jung-eun was born on February 10, 1999 in Cheongju, North Chungcheong Province, South Korea. She graduated from Hanlim Multi Art School alongside fellow Loona member Chuu in 2018.

== Career ==
=== 2017–2023: Debut with Loona ===
On May 15, 2017, Kim Lip was revealed as the sixth member of girl group Loona. Her eponymous debut solo single album was released on May 23 with title track "Eclipse", which was later included in NASA's playlist for the 2017 total solar eclipse. Kim Lip then appeared on Loona member Jinsoul's debut solo single album for the track "Love Letter" in June. She also featured on the song "See Saw" for member Go Won's debut single album.

On September 21, Loona members Kim Lip, Jinsoul, and Choerry debuted as Loona's second sub-unit Odd Eye Circle with the release of the extended play Mix & Match. On August 20, 2018, Kim Lip debuted with Loona as a full group through the release of their debut extended play [+ +].

In 2021, Loona members Yeojin, Kim Lip, Go Won, and Choerry collaborated with children's television show Cocomong to release the singles "Yum-Yum" and "Yummy-Yummy".

On November 28, 2022, Kim Lip, along with eight other members of Loona, filed an application for a provisional injunction to suspend their exclusive contract with Blockberry Creative, following Chuu's expulsion three days earlier.

=== 2023–Present: Artms and Modhaus ===
On January 13, 2023, it was reported that members Heejin, Kim Lip, Jinsoul, and Choerry had been granted a preliminary injunction against their contract with Blockberry Creative. On March 17, Kim Lip signed an exclusive contract with the agency Modhaus, which was founded by Loona's former creative director Jaden Jeong. On April 1, Kim Lip was announced as a member of the Modhaus project Artms alongside Heejin, Jinsoul, and Choerry, later joined by fellow Loona member Haseul.

On July 12, Kim Lip, Jinsoul, and Choerry released a second extended play as Odd Eye Circle under Modhaus.

On May 31, 2024, Artms debuted as a girl group with their debut album DALL.

On October 16, 2025, Kim Lip released the single "Can You Entertain?" along with a music video. NME ranked the song at number 13 in their list of the 25 best K-pop songs of 2025.

== Discography ==
=== Singles ===
Title	Year	Album
"Eclipse" (Note: credited to Loona, but the track is a solo by Kim Lip)	2017	Kim Lip
"Can You Entertain?"	2025	Non-album single

=== Songwriting credits ===
All songwriting credits are adapted from the Korea Music Copyright Association's database.

Title	Year	Artist	Album
"Not Friends"	2021	Loona	Non-album single
"Playback"	2022	Loona	Flip That
"Kiss Me Happy"	2022	Ailee	Listen-Up EP.1
"Air Force One"	2023	Odd Eye Circle	Version Up
"Sparkle"	2024	Artms	DALL
"Distress" (조난)	2024	Artms	DALL

== Videography ==
=== Music videos ===
Title	Year	Director(s)	Ref.
"Can You Entertain?"	2025	Digipedi	

== Filmography ==
=== Web series ===
Year	Title	Role	Ref.
2018	Do You Remember When We First Met?	Kim Jungeun	
