= Day6 videography =

Day6 discography
- Music videos: 26

Day6 videography is a videograph works compilation of Day6, a rock band from JYP Entertainment.

They had released three concert video albums, and 26 music videos in which 23 of them are Korean songs and the rest are Japanese songs.

Day6 had their first own variety show called DAY6 Real Trip <DAYOFF> in Jeju.

== Music videos ==
| Title | Year | Director(s) | Ref. |
Korean
| "Congratulations" | 2015 | Naive Creative Production | |
| "Letting Go" (놓아 놓아 놓아) | 2016 | VM Project Architecture | |
| "I Wait" (아 왜) | 2017 | Naive Creative Production | |
| "You Were Beautiful" (예뻤어) | 2017 | Naive Creative Production | |
| "How Can I Say" (어떻게 말해) | 2017 | Naive Creative Production | |
| "I'm Serious" (장난 아닌데) | 2017 | Naive Creative Production | |
| "Dance Dance" | 2017 | Naive Creative Production | |
| "I Smile" (반드시 웃는다) | 2017 | Naive Creative Production | |
| "Hi Hello" | 2017 | Naive Creative Production | |
| "What Can I Do" (좋은걸 뭐 어떡해) | 2017 | Naive Creative Production | |
| "I Loved You" | 2017 | Naive Creative Production | |
| "When You Love Someone" (그렇더라고요) | 2017 | Naive Creative Production | |
| "All Alone" (혼자야) | 2017 | Naive Creative Production | |
| "I Like You" (좋아합니다) | 2017 | Naive Creative Production | |
| "Shoot Me" | 2018 | Naive Creative Production | |
| "Beautiful Feeling" | 2018 | INSP (KOINRUSH) | |
| "Days Gone By" (행복했던 날들이었다) | 2018 | Naive Creative Production | |
| "Time of Our Life" (한 페이지가 될 수 있게) | 2019 | Etui Collective | |
| "Sweet Chaos" | 2019 | AVLE Studio Creative Production | |
| "Zombie" | 2020 | Naive Creative Production | |
| "You make Me" | 2021 | Naive Creative Production | |
| "Welcome to the Show" | 2024 | Novv Kim (Novv & 680house) | |
| "Melt Down" (녹아내려요) | 2024 | Novv Kim (Novv & 680house) | |
| "Maybe Tomorrow" | 2025 | Guzza (KUDO) | |
| "Inside Out" | 2025 | 725 (SL8 Visual Lab) | |
| "Dream Bus" | 2025 | Lee Raegyung | |
| "Our Season" | 2025 | Unknown | |
| "Lovin' the Christmas" | 2025 | Unknown | |
Japanese
| "If" (また逢えたら) | 2018 | Digipedi | |
| "Stop The Rain" | 2018 | Digipedi | |
| "Breaking Down" | 2018 | Digipedi | |

== Other videos ==
| Title | Year | Ref. |
Live video
| "Better Better" | 2017 | |
| "I'll Try" | 2017 | |
| "Days Gone By" (행복했던 날들이었다) | 2018 | |
| "Days Gone By" (행복했던 날들이었다) | 2019 | |
Every DAY6 Concert
| "I Need Somebody" (누군가 필요해) | 2018 | |
Lyric video
| "Zombie (English Ver.)" | 2020 | |
| "Happy" | 2024 | |
| "Maybe Tomorrow" | 2025 | |
Band performance video
| "You make Me" | 2021 | |
Live clip
| "Welcome to the Show" | 2024 | |
| "Happy" | 2024 | |
| "Melt Down" (녹아내려요) | 2024 | |
| "Monster" (괴물) | 2024 | |
| "Better Better" | 2024 | |

== Video albums ==
=== Concert tours ===
| Title | Details |
|---|---|
| Day6 Live Concert DVD Dream: CODA | Released: November 30, 2016; Label: JYP Entertainment; Format: DVD |
| Day6 - Every Day6 Finale Concert The Best Moments DVD | Released: September 11, 2018; Label: JYP Entertainment; Format: DVD |
| Day6 - 1st World Tour Youth DVD | Released: May 14, 2019; Label: JYP Entertainment; Format: DVD |

== Filmography ==
=== Web series ===
| Year | Title | Network | Notes | Ref. |
|---|---|---|---|---|
| 2019 | DAY6 Real Trip <DAYOFF> in Jeju | V Live+ | | |
| 2023–present | Healing Trip is an Excuse | YouTube | 3 seasons | |
| 2025 | Healing Trip For Real | YouTube | 1 season | |

== Others ==
=== Season's greetings ===
| Title | Information | Details of contents |
|---|---|---|
| Day6 - 2018 Season's Greetings 'Day & Night' | Released: December 11, 2017; Label: JYP Entertainment | 1. Calendar; 2. Diary; 3. Mini poster 4. Polaroid photocard |
| Day6 - 2019 Season's Greetings | Released: November 29, 2018; Label: JYP Entertainment | 1. Calendar; 2. Diary; 3. Deco sticker 4. Photocard set 5. Polaroid set 6. Pin button 7. DVD |
| Day6 - 2020 Season's Greetings | Released: December 5, 2019; Label: JYP Entertainment | 1. Calendar; 2. Diary; 3. Mini photobook 4. Membership card 5. Photo sticker 6. DVD; 7. Photo film |
| Day6 2025 Season’s Greetings [Way to Trip] | Released: December 20, 2024; Label: JYP Entertainment | 1. Calendar; 2. Diary; 3. Mini poster 4. Photocard; 5. Removable sticker 6. Memo pad 7. Metal logo keyring 8. ID photo 9. Mini L holder 10. Message card 11. Acrylic dangle keyring |
| Day6 2026 Season’s Greetings [Press The Button] | Release: December 22, 2025; Label: JYP Entertainment | 1. Desk calendar 2. Diary; 3. Mini poster 4. Selfie photocard 5. Removable sticker 6. Memo pad 7. PVC clear pouch 8. ID photo 9. Polaroid; 10. Message card 11. Paper mobile |
