= Digipedi =

South Korean video production company

Digipedi (Korean: 디지페디, short for Digital Pedicure) is a South Korean video production company formed and led by art director duo Seong Won-mo and Park Sang-woo (The latter already left the company). Based in Seoul, the studio specializes in the production of music videos, commercial films and visual art.

== Videography ==
=== Music videos ===
List of music videos, showing year released and artist
Year	Artist	Work	Ref.
2007	Dynamic Duo	"Complex"	
2008	Bizniz	"So Sick"	
2008	Buga Kingz	"Siren"	
2008	Clazziquai Project	"Beat in Love"	
2008	Clazziquai Project	"Flea"	
2008	Clazziquai Project	"Love Again"	
2008	My Aunt Mary	"Blue Tinware Scooter"	
2008	Shin Seung-hun	"Turn on the Radio"	
2008	Untouchable feat. Song Jieun	"Give You Everything"	
2008	W & Whale	"R.P.G Shine"	
2009	Jo Kwon & Whale	"Dunk Shoot"	
2009	Lee Seung-hwan	"Good Day 2"	
2009	Loveholics feat. Shin Min-a	"Miracle Blue"	
2009	MC Sniper & Outsider feat. Horan	"Heart Disease"	
2009	Smoky J	"Player"	
2009	W & Whale	"High School Sensation"	
2010	Double K	"Favorite Music"	
2010	Lee Juck	"With You"	
2010	Soul Dive & FPM	"L.I.E (Love Is Everywhere)"	
2010	YB & RRM	"Sneakers"	
2011	Kim Hyung-jun	"Oh! Ah!"	
2011	Kim Yeo-hee	"Half"	
2011	Eluphant	"Kidult"	
2011	Re:Plus	"Let the Story Tell"	
2011	Re:Plus	"New Age of Beats"	
2011	Rude Paper	"Radio"	
2011	Soul Dive	"Bad Habit"	
2011	Thomas Cook	"I Am Nothing at All"	
2011	W & Whale	"Break It Down"	
2012	Baechigi	"Two Mari"	
2012	Buga Kingz	"Don't Go"	
2012	Busker Busker	"Cherry Blossom Ending"	
2012	Clazzi feat. Yi Sung-yol	"Love & Hate"	
2012	Fresh Boyz feat. G.NA	"KingKong Shower"	
2012	Hello Venus	"What Are You Doing Today?"	
2012	Kero One feat. Esna	"Fast Life"	
2012	Orange Caramel	"Lipstick"	
2012	John Park	"Falling"	
2012	Primary feat. Zion.T & Gaeko	"See Through"	
2012	Seo In-young	"Anymore"	
2012	Seo In-young	"Let's Dance"	
2013	A-Jax	"Insane"	
2013	A-Jax	"Snake"	
2013	Andamiro	"Waiting"	
2013	B1A4	"What's Happening"	
2013	Cheeze	"Mango"	
2013	Dirty Radio	"Lost at Sea"	
2013	Double K feat. Michelle Lee	"Rewind"	
2013	Icon	"Rockstar"	
2013	IU	"Monday Afternoon"	
2013	Jinbo	"Be My Friend"	
2013	Jinbo	"Cops Come Knock"	
2013	Jinbo	"Fantasy"	
2013	Kero One	"In All the Wrong Places"	
2013	KK	"Boys Be..."	
2013	Ladies' Code	"Hate You"	
2013	Ladies' Code	"Pretty Pretty"	
2013	Lim Kim feat. Swings	"Voice"	
2013	Lim Kim	"Goodbye 20"	
2013	Loco feat. Narae of Spica	"Take Care"	
2013	LUSH	"Miserable"	
2013	John Park	"Baby"	
2013	SHINee	"Dream Girl"	
2013	Shin Seung-hun	"Sorry"	
2013	Soyou & Mad Clown	"Stupid in Love"	
2013	Swings	"A Real Lady"	
2013	Swings feat. Seo In-guk	"Would You?"	
2013	Zion.T feat. Gaeko	"Babay"	
2014	Apink	"Mr. Chu"	
2014	Beenzino	"How Do I Look"	
2014	Boys Republic	"Video Game"	
2014	Cherry Filter	"Andromeda"	
2014	Crucial Star feat. Sojin of Girl's Day	"Three Things I Want to Give to You"	
2014	Epik High	"Born Hater"	
2014	EXID	"Up & Down"	
2014	Fiestar	"One More"	
2014	Jun. K	"Love & Hate"	
2014	Jun. K	"No Love"	
2014	Kim Yeon-woo feat. Kyung of Block B	"Move"	
2014	Ladies' Code	"Kiss Kiss"	
2014	Lee Min-woo	"Taxi"	
2014	Loco feat. Jay Park	"Thinking About You"	
2014	Lovelyz	"Candy Jelly Love"	
2014	Lovelyz	"Good Night Like Yesterday"	
2014	Masta Wu feat. Dok2, Bobby	"Come Here"	
2014	Orange Caramel	"Catallena"	
2014	Orange Caramel	"The Gangnam Avenue"	
2014	Orange Caramel	"My Copycat"	
2014	John Park	"U"	
2014	Lena Park feat. Verbal Jint	"Sweet" (Brand New Mix)	
2014	Rainbow Blaxx	"Cha Cha"	
2014	Seo In-guk	"Bomtanaba"	
2014	Topp Dogg	"Annie"	
2014	Wax	"Fly High"	
2014	Wax	"Just Leave"	
2014	Wings	"Hair Short"	
2014	Yoon Hyun-sang with IU	"When Would It Be"	
2015	Andy	"Puppy Love"	
2015	April	"Dream Candy"	
2015	Beenzino	"Break"	
2015	Big Bang	"We Like 2 Party"	
2015	Davink	"Love Again"	
2015	EXID	"Hot Pink"	
2015	Giriboy feat. Shin Jisu	"Back and Forth 30 min"	
2015	Infinite	"Bad"	
2015	Jinusean feat. Jang Hanna	"Tell Me One More Time"	
2015	Kara	"Cupid"	
2015	Kim Jang-hoon	"What are you?"	
2015	Lee Juck	"Arguement"	
2015	Lim Kim	"Awoo"	
2015	Lizzy	"Not an Easy Girl"	
2015	Lovelyz	"Ah-Choo"	
2015	Lovelyz	"For You"	
2015	Lovelyz	"Hi~"	
2015	Lovelyz	"Shooting Star"	
2015	Mamamoo	"Ahh Oop!"	
2015	Norazo	"Ni Paljaya"	
2015	Primary feat. Lena Park	"Hello"	
2015	Primary feat. Beenzino, Suran	"Mannequin"	
2015	Psy feat. CL of 2NE1	"Daddy"	
2015	Psy	"Napal Baji"	
2015	San E feat. Baek Ye-rin of 15&	"Me You"	
2015	Seventeen & Ailee	"Q&A"	
2015	Stellar	"Vibrato"	
2015	Zion.T	"Eat"	
2016	Beenzino	"Life in Color"	
2016	CocoSori	"Dark Circle"	
2016	Giriboy feat. Brother Su	"Hogu"	
2016	Hanhae feat. Jung Eun-ji	"Eyescream"	
2016	Heize feat. Dean	"Shut Up & Groove"	
2016	Heize feat. Dean & DJ Friz	"And July"	
2016	Heize	"Star"	
2016	I.O.I	"Very Very Very"	
2016	J.Y. Park feat. Conan O'Brien, Steven Yeun & Jimin Park	"Fire"	
2016	Ladies' Code	"The Rain"	
2016	Lee Hi	"My Star"	
2016	Loona	"Around You"	
2016	Loona	"Let Me In"	
2016	Loona	"The Carol"	
2016	Lovelyz	"Destiny"	
2016	MC Gree	"Dangerous"	
2016	Mixx	"Oh Ma Mind"	
2016	Oh My Girl	"Liar Liar"	
2016	Oh My Girl	"Windy Day"	
2016	Pia	"SHINE"	
2016	Rainbow	"Whoo"	
2016	San E & Raina	"Sugar and Me"	
2016	Seventeen	"Very Nice"	
2016	Stellar	"Sting"	
2016	Stellar	"Crying"	
2016	Winner	"Sentimental"	
2016	Xia feat. The Quiett, Automatic	"Rock the World"	
2016	Zico	"I Am You, You Are Me"	
2017	Dreamcatcher	"Chase Me"	
2017	Dreamcatcher	"Good Night"	
2017	Eddy Kim	"Heart Pound"	
2017	EXID	"DDD"	
2017	Girl's Day	"I'll Be Yours"	
2017	Gugudan	"A Girl Like Me"	
2017	Gugudan	"Chococo"	
2017	Heize	"Don't Know You"	
2017	Jun. K	"No Shadow"	
2017	Loona 1/3	"Love & Live"	
2017	Loona 1/3	"Sonatine"	
2017	Loona	"Love Cherry Motion"	
2017	Loona	"Heart Attack"	
2017	Loona	"Singing in the Rain"	
2017	Loona	"Eclipse"	
2017	Loona Odd Eye Circle	"Girl Front"	
2017	Loona Odd Eye Circle	"Sweet Crazy Love"	
2017	Loona	"Everyday I Love You (Feat. HaSeul)"	
2017	Loona	"Kiss Later"	
2017	Loona	"New"	
2017	Lovelyz	"Now, We"	
2017	Lovelyz	"WoW!"	
2017	MXM	"I'M THE ONE"	
2017	N.Flying	"The Real"	
2017	Yang Hee-eun, Akdong Musician	"The Tree"	
2017	Yesung	"Paper Umbrella"	
2017	Yozoh	"Let It Shine"	
2018	BoA	"One Shot, Two Shot"	
2018	DAVII	"Only Me (Feat. Heize)"	
2018	Day6	"If ～また逢えたら～"	
2018	Day6	"Stop The Rain"	
2018	Day6	"Breaking Down"	
2018	Chansung	"Treasure"	
2018	fromis_9	"To Heart"	
2018	fromis_9	"DKDK"	
2018	fromis_9	"Love Bomb"	
2018	Got7	"I Won't Let You Go"	
2018	GyeongRee of 9MUSES	"Blue Moon"	
2018	Heize	"Jenga"	
2018	Heize	"MIANHAE"	
2018	Loona	"One&Only"	
2018	Loona	"Egoist (Feat. JinSoul)"	
2018	Loona yyxy	"love4eva (Feat. Grimes)"	
2018	Loona	"Favorite"	
2018	Loona	"Hi High"	
2018	MXM	"Diamond Girl"	
2018	Nichkhun	"Lucky Charm"	
2018	Pentagon	"Naughty Boy"	
2018	Rothy	"Lost Time"	
2018	Seventeen	"Call Call Call"	
2018	SFC.JGR	"Stairway"	
2018	Wanna One	"I.P.U"	
2019	AB6IX	"Hollywood"	
2019	AB6IX	"Breathe"	
2019	AB6IX	"Blind For Love"	
2019	fromis_9	"Fun!"	
2019	(G)I-DLE	"Uh-Oh"	
2019	(G)I-DLE	"Lion"	
2019	Got7	"Love Loop"	
2019	Heize	"We Don't Talk Together"	
2019	Iz*One	"Violeta"	
2019	Loona	"Butterfly"	
2019	Rothy	"Bee"	
2019	Ruann	"Beep Beep"	
2019	Tomorrow X Together	"Magic Island"	
2019	Tomorrow X Together	"Nap of a Star"	
2019	VERIVERY	"Tag Tag Tag"	
2019	Yukika	"Neon"	
2019	Yukika	"Cherries Jubiles"	
2020	Ateez	"INCEPTION"	
2020	BTS	“We are Bulletproof: the Eternal”	
2020	Lee Jin Hyuk	"Bedlam"	
2020	Loona	"So What"	
2020	Loona	"Why Not?"	
2020	P1Harmony	"Siren"	
2020	Seventeen	"Left & Right"	
2020	Seventeen	"Home;Run"	
2020	SF9	"Good Guy"	
2020	SF9	"Summer Breeze"	
2020	Tomorrow X Together	"Eternally"	
2020	Han Seung-woo	"Sacrifice"	
2020	VERIVERY	"Lay Back"	
2020	VERIVERY	"Thunder"	
2020	Yukika	"Yesterday"	
2020	Yukika	"Soul Lady"	
2021	Epik High	"Rosario (ft. CL, Zico)"	
2021	Tomorrow X Together	"Blue Hour (Japanese Ver)"	
2021	Pentagon	"Do or Not"	
2021	P1Harmony	"Scared"	
2021	Heize	"Happen"	
2021	Loona	"PTT (Paint the Town)"	
2021	SF9	"Tear Drop"	
2021	Enhypen	"Given-Taken (Japanese Ver)"	
2021	Sunmi	"You Can't Sit with Us"	
2021	Lee Hi	"Red Lipstick (Feat. Yoon Mirae)"	
2021	Loona	"Hula Hoop"	
2021	INI	"Rocketeer"	
2021	Tomorrow X Together	"0X1=LOVESONG (I Know I Love You) feat. Ikuta Lilas [Japanese Ver.]"	
2021	Ateez	"야간비행 (Turbulence)"	
2021	Ateez	"멋 (The Real) (흥 : 興 Ver.)"	
2022	P1Harmony	"Do It Like This"	
2022	Nmixx	"O.O"	
2022	Enhypen	"Tamed-Dashed [Japanese Ver.]"	
2022	&AUDITION - The Howling	"The Final Countdown"	
2022	Ateez	"Guerrilla"	
2022	Ateez	"Halazia"	
2022	P1Harmony	"Doom Du Doom"	
2022	&TEAM	"Under the Skin"	
2022	P1Harmony	"Back Down"	
2022	&TEAM	"Under the Skin (Extended ver.)"	
2023	P1Harmony	"JUMP"	
2023	xikers	"Rockstar"	
2023	xikers	"Tricky House"	
2023	&TEAM	"Firework"	
2023	Ateez	"Bouncy (K-Hot Chilli Peppers)"	
2023	&TEAM	"War Cry"	
2023	Sunmi	"Stranger"	
2024	IU	"Holssi"	
2024	Artms	"Birth"	
2024	Kiss of Life	"Midas Touch"	
2024	Artms	"Virtual Angel"	
2024	Ateez	"Work"	
2024	TWS	"내가 S면 넌 나의 N이 되어줘"	
2024	BamBam	"Last Parade"	
2024	Illit	"Cherish (My Love)"	
2025	Nmixx	"Know About Me"	
2025	Nexz	"O-RLY?"	
2025	Artms	"Burn"	
2025	Artms	"Icarus"	
2025	Stray Kids	"Ceremony"	
2025	NiziU	"▽Emotion"	
2025	&TEAM	"Back to Life"	
2025	Kim Lip	"Can You Entertain?"	
2025	Jinsoul	"Ring of Chaos"	
2025	Choerry	"Pressure"	
2026	xikers	"OKay"	

=== Commercial films ===
List of music videos, showing year released and artist
Year	Client	Work	Ref.
2007	CJ E&M	KMTV Rating	
2007	CJ E&M	KMTV Signal: It's Poppin' featuring E-Sens	
2008	INNO Design	APELBAUM	
2009	G-Market	Media Pole	
2009	G-Market	Theater Advertising	
2009	HappyCong, CJ E&M	HappyCong Filler	
2009	LG Electronics	LG Chocolate (BL40) Masters from the East	
2010	Daum Communications	Life On	
2010	LG Electronics	LG Optimus One The Code	
2010	LG Electronics	LG Optimus G Pro Adventures of Dr. Android	
2010	Samsung Electronics	Crazy Academy (agency: Cheil Worldwide)	
2010	Vans, CJ E&M	VANS X Mspriters Filler	
2011	Beats Electronics, CJ E&M	Beats by Dr. Dre	
2011	CJ E&M	Music X Live	
2011	Puma SE	PUMA Fass 300	
2012	Beats Electronics, CJ E&M	Beats by Dr. Dre Viral	
2013	CJ E&M	tvN Cheongdam-dong 111 OAP Package	
2013	LOEN Entertainment	History Debut Trailer	
2013	Puma SE	B1A4 X PUMA How to PUMA Suede	
2014	CJ E&M	tvN Cheongdam-dong 111: N.Flying's Way of Becoming a Star OAP Package	
Unknown	BC Card	BC Card Web	
Unknown	LG Telecom	Google Maps Service	

=== Other ===
2020

List of works, showing year released and client
Year	Client	Work	Ref.
2020	Tomorrow X Together	The Dream Chapter: ETERNITY Concept Trailer	
2022	&TEAM	Dark Moon: Grey City with &TEAM Story Film	
