= JinSoul (single album) =

Single album by Loona
- Released: June 26, 2017
- Genre: Future bass
- Length: 6:43
- Language: Korean
- Labels: Blockberry Creative; CJ E&M

Loona chronology
Kim Lip (2017)	JinSoul (2017)	Choerry (2017)

Alternative cover
- Kim Lip & JinSoul artwork

Music video
- "Singing in the Rain” on YouTube

JinSoul (also known as KimLip & JinSoul ) is the seventh single album from South Korean girl group Loona's pre-debut project. It was released digitally on June 26 and physically on June 28, 2017, by Blockberry Creative and distributed by CJ E&M. It officially introduces member JinSoul and contains two tracks, JinSoul's solo "Singing in the Rain" and a duet with Kim Lip called "Love Letter". A version of "Singing in the Rain" featuring HeeJin rapping was released July 9, 2017. The remix has an accompanying music video that was released via V Live.

== Track listing ==
No.	Title	Lyrics	Music	Arrangement	Length
1.	"Singing in the Rain" (JinSoul solo)	Park Ji-yeon, Hwang Hyun (MonoTree)	Daniel Caesar & Ludwig Lindell (Caesar & Loui), Nils Pontus Petersson, Karl Oskar-Julius Gummesson (Cage)	Karl Oskar-Julius Gummesson (Cage)	3:33
2.	"Love Letter" (Kim Lip and JinSoul duet)	Shin Agnes, Park Ji-yeon (MonoTree)	NOPARI, Lee Ju-hyung (MonoTree)	NOPARI (MonoTree)	3:10
Total length:					6:43

== Charts ==
Chart	Peak position	Sales
South Korea Gaon Weekly Album Chart	18	13,631
South Korea Gaon Monthly Album Chart	56	13,631
