= Welcome (TV series) =

2020 South Korean television series

- Promotional poster
- Hangul: 어서와
- RR: Eoseowa
- MR: Ŏsŏwa
- Genre: Fantasy; Romantic comedy
- Based on: Welcome by Go A-ra
- Developed by: KBS Drama Production
- Written by: Joo Hwa-mi
- Directed by: Ji Byung-hyun
- Starring: Kim Myung-soo; Shin Ye-eun; Seo Ji-hoon; Yoon Ye-joo; Kang Hoon
- Country of origin: South Korea
- Original language: Korean
- No. of episodes: 24 (Note: In order to circumvent Korean laws that prevent commercial breaks in the middle of an episode, what would previously have been aired as single 70 minute episodes are now being repackaged as two 35 minute episodes, with two episodes being shown each night with a commercial break between the two.)

Production
- Camera setup: Single-camera
- Running time: 35 minutes
- Production company: Gill Pictures (Note: Acquired by Studio Dragon in September 2022.)

Original release
- Network: KBS2
- Release: March 25 – April 30, 2020

Welcome (Korean: 어서와; RR: Eoseowa) is a 2020 South Korean television series starring Kim Myung-soo, Shin Ye-eun, Seo Ji-hoon, Yoon Ye-joo, and Kang Hoon. Based on the 2009–2010 Naver webtoon of the same name by Go A-ra, it aired on KBS2's Wednesdays and Thursdays at 22:00 (KST) from March 25 to April 30, 2020.

During its run, Welcome recorded a lowest single-episode rating of 0.8%, beating the previous record lows set by previous KBS2 dramas Lovely Horribly (2018) and Manhole (2017) to become the lowest rated drama airing in a primetime slot on a free-to-air network in history. Welcome's average rating of 1.7% was also the worst, until MBC drama Oh My Ladylord broke the record with a slightly lower average figure of 1.6% a year later.

== Synopsis ==
Kim Sol-ah, a young graphic designer, brings home a white cat named Hong-jo that can turn into a man. He becomes attracted to Sol-ah while hiding his cat identity from her.

== Cast ==
=== Main ===
- Kim Myung-soo as Hong-jo, a cat who dreams to be a human. Hong-jo realises that he can only be turned into a human by Sol-ah. He grew excessively fond of Sol-ah and can go to any measures to stay near her.
- Shin Ye-eun as Kim Sol-ah, a graphic designer who dreams to be a webtoon artist and has a love-hate relationship with cats. She used to be in relationship with Jae-seon, but tries hard to protect the secret identity of Hong-jo.
- Seo Ji-hoon as Lee Jae-sun, a man who was in relationship with Sol-ah until she realized his fear of cats. He went in a relationship with Lee Ru-bi. Jae-sun has somewhat a complicated relationship with his father. He is the first person to find out that Hong-jo is a cat who can turn into human from time to time.
- Yoon Ye-joo as Eun Ji-eun, a cat-like introvert in Sol-ah and Doo-sik's office.
- Kang Hoon as Go Doo-sik, Sol-ah and Jae-sun's friend with the personality of a dog.

=== Supporting ===
- Ahn Nae-sang as Kim Soo-pyeong, Sol-ah's father who works as a poet.
- Jo Ryun as Bang-sil, the woman whom Soo-pyeong likes and wishes to marry.
- Kim Yeo-jin as Sung Hyun-ja and Jeon Bae-soo as Go Min-joong, Doo-sik's parents.
- Jeon Ye-seo as Park Sin-ja
- Yang Dae-hyuk as Cha Sang-kwon
- Han Ye-seul as Lee Hye-yeon
- Lee Yu-jin as Choi Da-som
- Choi Min-geum as Grandmother
- Choi Bae-young as Ruby Lee, the actual owner of Hong-jo who was in relationship with Lee Jae-seon until she realized his fear of cats.
- Yeon Je-hyung as Bang Gook-bong, Bang-sil's son who loves traveling and writing.
- Song Min-jae as Da-sung
- Jo Hyuk-joon as Na Jin-won

== Production ==
Originally titled Man Who Bakes Bread (식빵 굽는 남자; Sikppang gumneun namja), the series planned to air on tvN in the first half of 2019, with the lead roles being offered to Yook Sung-jae and Park Eun-bin, (Note: Park became the female lead in the 2019–2020 SBS TV Friday-Saturday drama Hot Stove League, which was produced by the same production company behind Welcome.) but both rejected.

The first script reading took place in October 2019 at KBS Annex Broadcasting Station in Yeouido, South Korea.

== Original soundtrack ==
Welcome OST

Soundtrack album by Various Artists
- Released: 2020
- Genre: Soundtrack
- Languages: Korean; English
- Labels: Donuts Music N; Dreamus Company

=== Part 1 ===
Released on March 19, 2020
No.	Title	Lyrics	Music	Artist	Length
1.	"Oh My, Oh My" (어마어마)	Han Jae-wook; In Woo; Dony	Han Jae-wook; In Woo; Dony	Dayoung & Exy (Cosmic Girls)	2:54
2.	"Oh My, Oh My" (Inst.)		Han Jae-wook; In Woo; Dony		2:54
Total length:					5:52

=== Part 2 ===
Released on March 25, 2020
No.	Title	Lyrics	Music	Artist	Length
1.	"Ddingdong" (띵동)	Park Kyung (Block B)	Park Kyung (Block B); vintermoon	Park Kyung (Block B)	3:44
2.	"Ddingdong" (Inst.)		Park Kyung (Block B); vintermoon		3:44
Total length:					7:28

=== Part 3 ===
Released on March 26, 2020
No.	Title	Lyrics	Music	Artist	Length
1.	"Welcome (어서와)"	Hickee; Forever Noh	Forever Noh; Hickee	Umji (GFriend)	3:38
2.	"Welcome (어서와)" (Inst.)		Forever Noh; Hickee		3:38
Total length:					7:16

=== Part 4 ===
Released on April 1, 2020
No.	Title	Lyrics	Music	Artist	Length
1.	"Fall In Love" (사랑에 빠졌었나봐)	Hwang Yong-joo	Hwang Yong-joo	Juniel	3:30
2.	"Fall In Love" (Inst.)		Hwang Yong-joo		3:30
Total length:					7:00

=== Part 5 ===
Released on April 2, 2020
No.	Title	Lyrics	Music	Artist	Length
1.	"I Was Wrong"	Yang Seo-young; Dong Kyung; CLEF CREW	HR; Dong Kyung; CLEF CREW	Lee Jin-sol (April)	3:15
2.	"I Was Wrong" (Inst.)		HR; Dong Kyung; CLEF CREW		3:15
Total length:					6:30

=== Part 6 ===
Released on April 8, 2020
No.	Title	Lyrics	Music	Artist	Length
1.	"Slush"	Motte; Han Kyung-soo; Choi Han-sol	Han Kyung-soo; Choi Han-sol	Motte	3:19
2.	"Slush" (Inst.)		Han Kyung-soo; Choi Han-sol		3:19
Total length:					6:38

=== Part 7 ===
Released on April 9, 2020
No.	Title	Lyrics	Music	Artist	Length
1.	"Again, Spring" (다시, 봄)	Jung Eun-jin; Kim Chang-rak; Kim Soo-bin; Clef Crew	Kim Chang-rak; Kim Soo-bin; Clef Crew	Kihyun (Monsta X)	3:24
2.	"Again, Spring" (Inst.)		Kim Chang-rak; Kim Soo-bin; Clef Crew		3:24
Total length:					6:48

=== Part 8 ===
Released on April 15, 2020
No.	Title	Lyrics	Music	Artist	Length
1.	"As Time Goes" (시간은 한 바퀴 돌아)	Jay Lee	Jay Lee	Jinsoul (Loona)	3:07
2.	"As Time Goes" (Inst.)		Jay Lee		3:07
Total length:					6:14

=== Part 9 ===
Released on April 16, 2020
No.	Title	Lyrics	Music	Artist	Length
1.	"Better To Be You"	Drew Ryan Scott; Dave Hawks; Ping	Drew Ryan Scott; Dave Hawks; Ping	Drew Ryan Scott	3:49
2.	"Better To Be You" (Inst.)		Drew Ryan Scott; Dave Hawks; Ping		3:49
Total length:					7:38

=== Part 10 ===
Released on April 22, 2020
No.	Title	Lyrics	Music	Artist	Length
1.	"Last Goodbye" (이젠 안녕)	BachelorNextDoor; Jo Yoo-ma	Linnea Gawell	Floody	3:44
2.	"Last Goodbye" (Inst.)		Linnea Gawell		3:44
Total length:					7:28

=== Part 11 ===
Released on April 23, 2020
No.	Title	Lyrics	Music	Artist	Length
1.	"Show Your Heart" (너를 보여줘)	Jeon Geun-hwa (Weekly1)	Jeon Geun-hwa (Weekly1); Jo Se-hee; Lee Ju-heon	Chan (A.C.E)	3:28
2.	"Show Your Heart" (Inst.)		Jeon Geun-hwa (Weekly1); Jo Se-hee; Lee Ju-heon		3:28
Total length:					6:56

=== Part 12 ===
Released on April 29, 2020
No.	Title	Lyrics	Music	Artist	Length
1.	"Shooting Star" (별똥별)	Hwang Yong-joo	Hwang Yong-joo	Shin Ye-eun	2:58
2.	"Shooting Star" (Inst.)		Hwang Yong-joo		2:58
Total length:					5:56

=== Part 13 ===
Released on April 30, 2020
No.	Title	Lyrics	Music	Artist	Length
1.	"Blooming" (꽃이 피었네)	Nap!er	Nap!er	Choi Nakta	3:09
2.	"Blooming" (Inst.)		Nap!er		3:09
Total length:					6:18

== Ratings ==
Average TV viewership ratings (nationwide)
Ep.	Original broadcast date	Average audience share (Nielsen Korea)
1	March 25, 2020	3.6%
2	March 25, 2020	2.8%
3	March 26, 2020	1.6%
4	March 26, 2020	1.8%
5	April 1, 2020	2.7%
6	April 1, 2020	2.1%
7	April 2, 2020	1.5%
8	April 2, 2020	1.7%
9	April 8, 2020	2.0%
10	April 8, 2020	1.9%
11	April 9, 2020	1.5%
12	April 9, 2020	1.6%
13	April 15, 2020	1.8%
14	April 15, 2020	1.8%
15	April 16, 2020	0.9%
16	April 16, 2020	1.1%
17	April 22, 2020	1.8%
18	April 22, 2020	1.7%
19	April 23, 2020	1.0%
20	April 23, 2020	1.1%
21	April 29, 2020	1.4%
22	April 29, 2020	1.4%
23	April 30, 2020	0.8%
24	April 30, 2020	1.0%
Average		1.7%
In the table above, the blue numbers represent the lowest ratings and the red numbers represent the highest ratings.
