= Jinsoul =

South Korean singer (born 1997)

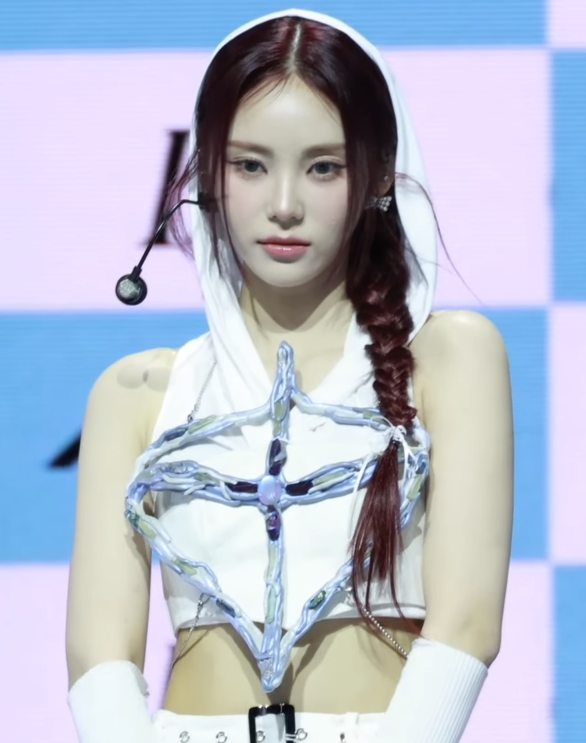
- Jinsoul in 2024
- Born: Jeong Jin-sol; June 13, 1997 (age 29); Seoul, South Korea
- Occupation: Singer
- Musical career
- Genre: K-pop
- Instrument: Vocals
- Years active: 2017–present
- Labels: Blockberry Creative; Modhaus
- Member of: Loona; Odd Eye Circle; Artms

Korean name
- Hangul: 정진솔
- RR: Jeong Jinsol
- MR: Chŏng Chinsol

Jeong Jin-sol (Korean: 정진솔; born June 13, 1997), known professionally as Jinsoul (occasionally stylized as JinSoul), is a South Korean singer. She is a member of the South Korean girl group Loona, its sub-unit Odd Eye Circle, and Artms. In April 2020, her song "As Time Goes" debuted at number two on Billboard's World Digital Song Sales chart.

== Early life ==
Jeong Jin-sol was born on June 13, 1997, in Seoul, South Korea. She attended college to study practical music.

== Career ==
=== 2017–2023: Debut with Loona ===
Jinsoul was originally cast through Instagram before becoming a Blockberry Creative trainee. Before being introduced as the seventh member of the South Korean girl group Loona, Jinsoul appeared on the b-side for the fifth member ViVi's single album ViVi, released on April 17, 2017, and was later briefly revealed for the first time in the song's music video. On June 13, Blockberry Creative revealed Jinsoul as Loona's seventh member. On June 26, she officially debuted as a member of Loona with her eponymous solo single album with the title track "Singing in the Rain". She collaborated with the eighth member Choerry for the song "Puzzle" on the single album Choerry, released on July 28. She was later featured on twelfth member HyeJu's song "Egoist" on the single album Olivia Hye.

On September 21, Jinsoul debuted alongside fellow members Kim Lip and Choerry as Loona's second sub-unit Odd Eye Circle with the release of the extended play Mix & Match. On August 20, 2018, Jinsoul debuted with Loona as a full group through the release of their debut mini album [+ +].

On April 23, 2020, Jinsoul's song "As Time Goes" debuted at number two on Billboard's World Digital Song Sales chart. It was the highest debut and the best-selling K-pop song of the week.

On November 28, 2022, JTBC Entertainment News reported that nine members of Loona, including Jinsoul, had filed an application for a provisional injunction to suspend their exclusive contract with Blockberry Creative, following member Chuu's expulsion three days earlier.

=== 2023–Present: Artms and Modhaus ===
On January 13, 2023, it was reported that members Heejin, Kim Lip, Jinsoul, and Choerry had been granted a preliminary injunction against their contract with Blockberry Creative. On March 17, Jinsoul signed an exclusive contract with the agency Modhaus, which was founded by Loona's former creative director Jaden Jeong. On April 1, Jinsoul was announced as a member of the Modhaus project Artms alongside Heejin, Kim Lip, and Choerry, later joined by fellow Loona member Haseul.

On July 12, Kim Lip, Jinsoul, and Choerry released a second extended play, titled <Version Up>, as Odd Eye Circle under Modhaus.

On May 31, 2024, Artms debuted as a girl group with their album DALL.

On October 23, 2025, Jinsoul released the single "Ring of Chaos".

== Discography ==
=== Singles ===
Title	Year	Album
"Singing in the Rain" (Note: credited to Loona, but the track is a solo by Jinsoul)	2017	JinSoul
"Ring of Chaos"	2025	Non-album single

=== Soundtrack appearances ===
List of soundtrack appearances, showing year released and album name
Title	Year	Peak chart positions	Album
Title	Year	US World	Album
"Masquerade" (with Heejin)	2022	—	Tracer Original Soundtrack
"As Time Goes"	2022	2	Welcome Original Soundtrack

=== Songwriting credits ===
All songwriting credits are adapted from the Korea Music Copyright Association's database.

Title	Year	Artist	Album
"Sparkle"	2024	Artms	DALL
"Birth"	2024	Artms	DALL

== Videography ==
=== Music videos ===
Title	Year	Director(s)	Ref.
"Ring of Chaos"	2025	Digipedi	

== Filmography ==
=== Web series ===
Year	Title	Role	Ref.
2018	Do You Remember When We First Met?	Self	
