= DALL =

- Digital cover

Studio album by Artms
- Released: May 31, 2024
- Genres: K-pop; art pop; pop
- Length: 30:02
- Labels: Modhaus; Kakao
- Producer: Jaden Jeong

Artms chronology
DALL (2024)	Burn (2025)

Singles from DALL
- 1. "Birth" Released: March 29, 2024; 2. "Flower Rhythm" Released: April 11, 2024; 3. "Candy Crush" Released: April 25, 2024; 4. "Air" Released: May 10, 2024; 5. "Virtual Angel" Released: May 31, 2024

Dall (stylized as <Dall>, an abbreviation of Devine All Love and Live), is the debut studio album by the South Korean girl group Artms. The album contains 11 tracks, including four pre-release singles. The album was released by Modhaus on May 31, 2024.

== Background and release ==
On January 20, the group announced their debut plans for the next month. Two days after announcing plans to debut, fans had the opportunity to choose the main song and a B-side of the album through their official app, Cosmo. Out of four songs, "Birth" was selected as the main song, with runner-up "Distress" (조난) as the B-side. Four pre-release singles, including "Birth", were revealed by Modhaus via social media platforms. The four pre-release singles "Birth", "Flower Rhythm", "Candy Crush", and "Air" were released before the release of DALL on March 29, April 11, April 25, and May 10 respectively. The lead single "Virtual Angel" was released together with the album on May 31, marking the group's official debut and the release of DALL.

== Accolades ==
=== Listicles ===
Name of publisher, year listed, name of listicle, and placement
Publisher	Year	List	Work	Placement	Ref.
Billboard	2024	The 20 Best K-Pop Albums of 2024 (So Far): Staff Picks	DALL	11th	
Billboard	2024	The 25 Best K-Pop Albums of 2024: Staff Picks	DALL	12th	
Billboard	2024	The 25 Best K-Pop Songs of 2024: Staff Picks	"Virtual Angel"	9th	
Idology	2024	16 Best Albums of 2024	DALL	Placed	
Idology	2024	Best Music Videos of 2024	"Virtual Angel"	Placed	

== Track listing ==
All tracks are produced by Jaden Jeong.

DALL track listing
No.	Title	Lyrics	Music	Arrangement	Length
1.	"URL"	Jaden Jeong, Sungwoo Kim	El Capitxn, Vendors (Arte), Vendors (Nano), Jongsoo Kim	Vendors (Arte), El Capitxn, Vendors (Nano)	1:07
2.	"Virtual Angel"	Jaden Jeong, Sungwoo Kim	El Capitxn, Maria Marcus, Andrew Choi, Vendors (Nano), Vendors (Arte), Vendors (Zenur), Jongsoo Kim	El Capitxn, Vendors (Nano), Vendors (Zenur), Vendors (Arte)	2:54
3.	"Sparkle"	Heejin, Kim Lip, JinSoul, Jaden Jeong	hymax, Daniel Kim, Oona Muurinen	hymax	2:31
4.	"The Hitchhiker's Guide to the Galaxy" (은하수를 여행하는 히치하이커를 위한 안내서)	G-high (MonoTree)	G-high, 권애진 (MonoTree)	G-high (MonoTree)	3:31
5.	"Flower Rhythm"	Alice Vicious (AW:crew), 9june9, Artronic Waves, yeon (AW:crew)	Artronic Waves, yeon (AW:crew)	Artronic Waves	2:40
6.	"Candy Crush"	C'SA, Kim Jinsol	sweetch, C'SA	sweetch	3:01
7.	"Air"	G-high (MonoTree)	G-high (MonoTree), Janet Suhh	G-high (MonoTree)	2:27
8.	"Unf/Air"	COE, bonelesscat	Agwi, COE, Kim Ji Seop, Coup D'etat, Suyo, OoOo	Agwi, Kim Ji Seop	2:46
9.	"Distress" (조난)	Kim Lip, Pinkmoon	Fuxxy, Anymasingga, Nild, 권애진 (MonoTree), Pinkmoon	Anymasingga, Fuxxy, Nild (MonoTree), Pinkmoon	2:57
10.	"Butterfly Effect"	G-High (MonoTree), Barrett Marshall, Moon Water	Barrett Marshall, Moon Water, Fuxxy, Anymasingga (MonoTree)	Anymasingga, Fuxxy (MonoTree), Barrett Marshall, Moon Water	3:26
11.	"Birth"	JinSoul, Jaden Jeong	hymax, View	hymax	2:42
Total length:					30:02

== Charts ==
=== Weekly charts ===
Weekly chart performance for DALL
Chart (2024)	Peak position
South Korean Albums (Circle)	7
US World Albums (Billboard)	7

=== Monthly charts ===
Monthly chart performance for DALL
Chart (2024)	Position
South Korean Albums (Circle)	26

== Release history ==
Release history for DALL
Region	Date	Format	Label
South Korea	May 31, 2024	CD	Modhaus
Various	May 31, 2024	Digital download; streaming	Modhaus
