= Cocomong =

South Korean animated series

- Country of origin: South Korea
- Original languages: Korean, English
- No. of seasons: 3
- No. of episodes: 78

Production
- Running time: 13 minutes

Original release
- Network: EBS
- Release: February 27, 2008 – May 28, 2015

Cocomong (Korean: 코코몽; RR: Kokomong) is a South Korean 3D animated children's television series created by Olive Studio. Broadcast on EBS since 2008–2015, the animation "Fresh World, Cocomong" spurred the production of three series that started with Fresh World, Cocomong season 1 in 2008, followed by the English education program Hello Cocomong season 1 in 2010 and Hello Cocomong season 2 in 2014. It then continued with Fresh World, Cocomong season 2 in 2011, and ended with Cocomong season 3 in 2015. This cartoon sets place in the imaginary Refrigerator Land, where everyday ingredients transform into half-animal and half-food friends who love a good adventure. A sausage themed monkey named Cocomong is the main character of this series. It was formerly available in the US and UK on Netflix.

== Characters ==
- Cocomong (코코몽; Kokomong), A sausage themed monkey. He is the main protagonist of the franchise. (Appears in all series)
- Robocong (로보콩; Robokong), Cocomong's robot. he is usually called for whenever Virus King is attacking Cing-Cing village Cocomong dresses up as a prototype of him in the season 1 episode, "I am Robocong". (Appears since series 2)
- Aromi (아로미; Aromi), An egg themed rabbit who is Cocomong's best friend and former rival, prior to Padak's gender change and the introduction to Candy-Pow, she was the only female character. (Appears in all series)
- Kaero (케로; Kero), is a carrot themed donkey who loves to sing songs. (Appears in all series)
- Agle (아글; Ageul), A cucumber themed alligator who serves as a chef serving healthy food. (Appears in all series)
- Doori (두리; Duri), A radish and mushroom themed hippopotamus, he is one of Cocomong's friends. (Appears in all series)
- Padak (파닥; Padak), A green onion-shaped rooster. Initially, his gender was unknown, but it was later revealed that he is male. In the episode "Is Padak Really Sick?", he tends to pretend that he is sick.
- Dookong, Saekong, Naekong (두콩, 세콩, 네콩; Dukong, Sekong, Nekong), Three pea themed pigs, but in Season 2, they were changed to raccoons for some unknown reason. (Appear in all series)
- Tor (토리; Tori), an acorn themed songbird. (Appears only in Series 1)
- Tuni (투니; Tuni) a tuna fish. He is the new friend of Cocomong who appeared in the season 3 episode "Our New Friend, Tuni" (Appears since Series 3)
- Omong, Cocomong's shrimp themed dog who is Cocomong's pet who appears in the episode 'Hello Omong'. (Appears in all series)
- Virus King (세균킹; Segyunking), A moody orange themed mouse who is the main antagonist that first appears in Series 2. (Appears in Series 2 and 3)
- Dark-pow (다크팡; Dakeupang), is Virus King's robot. (Appears since Series 3)
- Candy-pow (캔디팡; Kaendipang), A candy themed cat who is one of Virus King's minions and secondary antagonists, she gets a redemption arc in "Potato-pow is a Genius~?", only to become evil again in "Candy-pow Returns to Virus Kingdom". (Appears since series 2)
- Potato-pow (감자팡; Gamjapang), A potato themed beaver who is one of Virus King's minions and secondary antagonists. (Appears since Series 2)

== Voice Actors ==
=== Korean ===
- Jeong Seon-Hye as Cocomong
- Jung Mira as Robocong
- Yang Jeong-hwa as Aromi
- Kim Jang as Kaero
- Shin Yong-Woo as Agle
- Hong Beom-Gi as Doori
- Lee Hyun-Jin as Tori
- Choi Joon-yeong as Dookong
- Lee Jae-Myung as Saekong
- Han Chae-eon as Naekong
- Hyeok Jeong as Omong and Tuni
- Jeon Tae-yeol as Virus King
- Jang Eon-Sook as Candy Pow
- Jung Yeong-woong as Potato Pow

=== English ===
- Anna Paik as Cocomong
- Catherine Bommie Han as Aromi, Omong, Tuni, Saecong (Season 1 only)
- Mike Yantzi as Kaero and Virus King
- Unknown as Naekong (Season 1) and Tori
- Unknown as Padak (Season 1)
- Nancy Kim as Saekong (Season 2 and 3) and Candy Pow
- Josh Schwartzentruber as Agle, Dookong, and Potato Pow
- Anna Desmarais as Padak and Naekong (Season 2 and 3 only)
- Garan Fitzgerald as Doori

== Episodes ==
=== Season 1 (2008) ===
No.	Title	Premiere
1	"Hello Refrigerator Land Friends!"	27 February 2008
The cold air from the air circulation duct in the refrigerator turned the vegetables into animals: The pea-shaped pig/raccoon brothers Dookong, Saekong and Naekong, mushroom/radish-shaped hippo Doori, carrot-shaped donkey Kaero, and cucumber-shaped alligator Agle. They travel to Refrigerator Land (Cutie Land) through the air duct. They fall on egg-shaped rabbit Aromi's flower garden! The animals help to fix and reorganize Aromi's flower garden which was damaged because of them.
2	"Be Careful In the Kitchen"	5 March 2008
Aromi, Cocomong, Dookong, Saekong and Naekong are playing hide and seek together. Doori, Kaero, and Padak join them and Cocomong becomes "it" and they start again. Cocomong finds his friends one by one, but where is Aromi? Can Cocomong find Aromi?
3	"I am Faster!"	12 March 2008
Aromi and Cocomong race. Cocomong cannot beat Aromi. He cheats and starts to use tree vines to swing and catch up with Aromi. In the middle of the race, they meet their friends who are in trouble. Cocomong who does not want to lose to Aromi ignores his friends, but Aromi helps all their friends even though she will lose the race.
4	"Hello Omong?"	19 March 2008
One day, a cute little puppy comes to Refrigerator Land (Cutie Land). "Omong Omong!" is how he barks so Cocomong names him Omong. Cocomong thinks Omong is just a bother to him, but as he gets help from Omong over and over he embraces Omong as a new friend.
5	"Monster In the Carrot Farm"	26 March 2008
One day a strange thing appears in Kaero's carrot farm. As the animals hear the stories about the thing, their imaginations create new images about the thing. As they pass on the stories with the small twists of their imaginations, the thing becomes bigger and bigger and more dangerous. What is that scary thing really?
6	"I'm Going To Catch a Fish"	2 April 2008
Cocomong and his friends go to a fishing place. Cocomong who is impatient feels jealous of Doori who is catching many fish while patiently sitting at his spot. As Cocomong becomes more competitive and tries different methods to catch some fish, it becomes harder and harder to catch a fish. Doori gives Cocomong some advice about being patient. Cocomong listens to him and becomes patient. Finally, Cocomong catches a fish.
7	"Let's Play Together!"	9 April 2008
The animal friends decide to hold a concert, but there are no instruments. What should they do? Aromi asks Cocomong the inventor, but Cocomong says no. While he's walking Cocomong finds a tree that bares delicious fruit when it hears beautiful music. Cocomong thinks that if he and his friends have a concert they will be able to eat a lot of the fruit. Cocomong makes the instruments for his friends, but all of them fight over bigger and fancier instruments...
8	"Is Padak Really Sick?"	16 April 2008
Padak is on cleaning duty, but he doesn't want to clean so he thinks of a trick. In front of Aromi, he pretends that he is sick by grabbing his tummy. He starts to enjoy lying. He lies to the pea pig brothers so they will water and take care of Padak's green onion farm. The animals figure out that Padak was lying, and they plan an event to tease Padak. Padak repents that he lied.
9	"Agle's Hat Flew Away"	23 April 2008
Aromi ruined Agle's chef hat. Aromi gets a new chef hat and gives it as a present to Agle, but the pea pigs' prank makes the hat fly up and hang on a tree. The animals try their own ways to bring down the hat, but they can't do it individually. They come to understand that they need to work together. Finally they get the hat, and give it back to Agle.
10	"Kaero Is So Cool"	30 April 2008
Kaero sings a song that slanders his friends. Padak comes after Kaero with great anger. Kaero hides in an empty house to avoid Padak. Soon enough of his friends come into the house, so he hides in the closet and hears their friends stories. Kaero hears from Aromi that his song helped her to cheer up. Instead of slandering lyrics he changes the song to have lyrics that praise his friends.
11	"I Wish I Had a Tail"	7 May 2008
The animals become envious of animals with great tails. They wish they each had their own tails. Cocomong makes tails for each animal and matches their needs, but soon enough they start to complain.
12	"I am Robocong"	14 May 2008
Cocomong feels jealous of Aromi who can skateboard really well, and he pushes Aromi's skateboard. Aromi falls and needs a cast. Cocomong feels sorry for Aromi who cannot move that well. He makes a robot Cocomong and starts to help Aromi with her chores. Aromi angrily starts to make him do many things, but soon she realizes it is Cocomong disguising as a robot, and she forgives Cocomong because she feels his sincerity.
13	"I Want To Be an Eagle!"	21 May 2008
Padak is not good at anything. He wants to be able to fly like the eagle in a picture book. He asks Cocomong to make wings for him and tries to fly many times. Through many different events he finds out one thing that he is good at. He can make Saekong fall asleep under his wings while patting.
14	"I Want To Be Taller"	28 May 2008
The pea pigs want to be taller so they try to learn ways to become taller from their friends. They try to imitate and follow everything that their tall friends do, stretching, dancing, and singing, but no matter what they do they don't become taller. Later on they realize they have to eat healthily and exercise to become taller.
15	"I'm not Scared of Night"	4 June 2008
Aromi walks toward Agle house at night to return Agle's chef hat that he left behind. She hears animals, and the shadows of the trees look like ghosts. Aromi is scared before she notices that watermelon moon is following her as if protecting her. Aromi overcomes her fear with help from watermelon moon.
16	"Be Careful"	11 June 2008
Aromi lets her friends play on her trampoline. While the animals are eating Cocomong gets on the trampoline with cookies and juice. As Cocomong jumps on the trampoline it bounces him out, and he crashes on a sofa. There are cookies and juice everywhere. Doori reorganizes and decorates Aromi's house, and Cocomong makes a very comfortable rocking chair.
17	"Doori, Let's Play!"	18 June 2008
Doori has difficulties playing with his friends because of his huge body. When he pushes a swing for Aromi, Aromi flies away because he is so strong. He tries to ride a slide but he gets stuck. In an obstacle race his big body is a problem. His friends suggest riding the seesaw with Doori who was about to give up playing with his friends.
18	"Seeds From Watermelon Moon"	25 June 2008
After finishing some apples they had, the Pea pigs want to have some more apples. They see Aromi planting chocolate flower seeds in her flower garden, so they decide to plant apples that they finished eating in their yard. They try to plant the apples each in his own way, but something is missing for each. They wait and watch overnight with Padak who came to visit, but the apples remain the same, and the pea pigs get disappointed and return to their house. Watermelon moon who saw them and felt sympathy sends a few seeds to them.
19	"Keep Your Promises"	2 July 2008
Aromi made a promise to go sleigh riding with Doori, but she recalls her promise after an hour after the appointment has passed by. Even though she realizes that, she continues to play with Cocomong, and time goes by. She sees Padak who keeps his promises, and she decides to go to the meeting place. She feels sorry for Doori who waited all this time...
20	"Taking a Bath Is Fun"	9 July 2008
Omong hates taking a bath because of Cocomong's pranks. The animals come up with many ideas to wash Omong who has dirt all over himself. A towel game with many different color towels, a water gun fight, a soap bubble game and anything that would interest Omong are used to make Omong to come to the bathtub.
21	"Who Took It?"	16 July 2008
Aromi's flower, Doori's paint, and Agle's cherries disappeared. Doori becomes the detective. While he was looking for a suspect, he thinks the pea pigs and Padak have something to do with it. But the real suspect is Cocomong! He took the things from his friends without asking them in order to make a fireworks machine. Doori says that he is sorry to suspect his friends, and Cocomong apologizes to his friends for taking things without their approval.
22	"Why It Is So Hot?"	23 July 2008
Cocomong made a cold air fruit making machine, but it sucks up cold air from other places to make the fruit. As the cold air gets sucked up by the machine, Refrigerator Land becomes hotter and hotter. Even Padak and Kaero start to melt and return to being a green onion and a carrot.
23	"Omong's New Friend"	30 July 2008
Omong feels lonely as Cocomong pays attention only to his new invention project. He wanders here and there and meets a cold air fish and plays with it. Later on Cocomong realizes that Omong is missing and starts to look for him.
24	"Save the Banana"	6 August 2008
Cocomong, the inventor, made a 'Banana Gun.' If anything gets shot by the banana gun, it turns into a banana. Oh no! Cocomong gets hit by the Banana gun and becomes a banana. The pea pig brothers do not recognize that the banana is Cocomong and they dream of eating the delicious banana. Aromi is trying her best to rescue Cocomong. Can Cocomong be saved?
25	"Who's the Suspect?"	13 August 2008
Aromi's flower, Doori's paint, and Agle's cherries disappeared. Doori becomes the detective. While he was looking for a suspect, he thinks the pea pigs and Padak have something to do with it. But the real suspect is Cocomong! He took the things from his friends without asking them in order to make a fireworks machine. Doori says that he is sorry to suspect his friends, and Cocomong apologizes to his friends for taking things without their approval.
26	"We Have the Same Birthday"	20 August 2008
They have the same birthday. They both invite their friends to their own birthday parties. The friends do not know what to do. They ponder and decide to hold one big birthday party for both of Cocomong and Aromi.

=== Season 2 (2011) ===
Episode	Title	Premiere
1	Here Comes!! Robocong!!	4 March 2011
2	Don't Waste Food!	11 March 2011
3	New Things Are Best	18 March 2011
4	Super Plant Tonic	25 March 2011
5	Brush, Brush, Brush Your Teeth	1 April 2011
6	Birthday Party Chaos	8 April 2011
7	Find the Carrot!	15 April 2011
8	Wash Your Hands Squeaky Clean	22 April 2011
9	Blast Off, Robocong!	29 April 2011
10	Virus King Has Changed	6 May 2011
11	Agle Has Disappeared!	13 May 2011
12	Let's Play Outside	20 May 2011
13	Cing-Cing Village's New Chef!	27 May 2011
14	Kaero's Impossible!	3 June 2011
15	I Like Cocomong!	10 June 2011
16	Washing Dishes is A Nuisance	17 June 2011
17	Aromi To The Rescue!	24 June 2011
18	Don't Waste Precious Water!!	1 July 2011
19	Don't Let Them Float Away!	8 July 2011
20	Candy-pow's Invitation	15 July 2011
21	Doori's Paper Plane!	22 July 2011
22	Beware Of Sugar!	29 July 2011
23	Faster! Faster!	5 August 2011
24	Go To Bed Early	12 August 2011
25	Who's my Secret Friend?	19 August 2011
26	Keeping The Rules Every Day	26 August 2011

=== Season 3 (2015) ===
Episode	Title	Premiere
1	Robocong vs Dark-pow	March 4, 2015
2	Find the Secret Food	March 5, 2015
3	The Healthy Youth Contest	March 11, 2015
4	The Cong Brothers' Doo-doo Troubles	March 11, 2015
5	I'm the King of Inventions	March 12, 2015
6	Doori's Weight Loss Plan	March 18, 2015
7	The Secret of Ghost Forest	March 19, 2015
8	Run, Potato-pow, Run!	March 25, 2015
9	Greedy Naecong!	March 26, 2015
10	Kaero's Awesome Grandmother	April 1, 2015
11	Thank You, Agle!	April 2, 2015
12	Potato-pow is a Genius?	April 8, 2015
13	Aromi vs Candy-pow	April 9, 2015
14	Candy-pow Returns to Virus Kingdom	April 15, 2015
15	Cocomong Has a Cavity!	April 16, 2015
16	Cocomong's Brain Has Shrunk!	April 22, 2015
17	Our New Friend, Tuni!	April 23, 2015
18	Virus King's Secret!	April 29, 2015
19	Let's Go Camping, Cocomong!	April 30, 2015
20	Anchovies Make Your Bones Strong!	May 6, 2015
21	Oh No! We've Shrunk!	May 7, 2015
22	Potato-pow and the Golden Mango	May 13, 2015
23	I'm the Fastest!	May 14, 2015
24	Virus King's Trap	May 20, 2015
25	Trouble in Fresh World (pt 1)	May 27, 2015
26	Trouble in Fresh World (pt 2)	May 28, 2015
