= Blockberry Creative =

South Korean record label

- Native name: 블록베리크리에이티브
- Type: Private
- Industry: Music
- Genre: K-Pop
- Founded: March 22, 2016; 10 years ago
- Defunct: c. 2023–2024
- Fate: Defunct
- Headquarters: Seongbuk-gu, Seoul, South Korea
- Key people: Lee Jong-myeong; Kim Seon-hye
- Parent: Polaris Entertainment; Levite United
- Website: www.blockberrycreative.com (dead link)

Blockberry Creative (Korean: 블록베리크리에이티브; stylized as BlockBerry Creative) was a South Korean record label formed in 2016. It was a subsidiary of Polaris Entertainment. The label previously managed soloist Sunye and the girl group Loona.

== History ==
Blockberry Creative was officially established on March 22, 2016, as a subsidiary label of Polaris Entertainment.

On October 2, 2016, Blockberry Creative launched their first girl group project, Loona (Korean: 이달의 소녀; RR: Idarui Sonyeo; lit Girl of the Month), which was expected to run for 18 months. The project would individually introduce each member of the new group by releasing a solo single, and by March 2018 all members had been introduced. As of June 2023, all members of the girl group have won their cases of contract termination and left Blockberry Creative.

In February 2022, Sunye signed a contract with Blockberry Creative. On March 16, 2022, Blockberry announced their first boy group project, Boy of the Month (Korean: 이달 의 소년; RR: Idarui Sonyeon).

On June 29, 2023, Sunye announced through her social media account that she had terminated her contract with Blockberry Creative.

== Former artists ==
- Loona
  - HeeJin (2016–2023)
  - HyunJin (2016-2023)
  - HaSeul (2016-2023)
  - YeoJin (2016-2023)
  - ViVi (2016-2023)
  - Kim Lip (2017-2023)
  - JinSoul (2017–2023)
  - Choerry (2017–2023)
  - Yves (2017–2023)
  - Chuu (2017–2022)
  - Go Won (2018–2023)
  - HyeJu (formerly Olivia Hye) (2018–2023)
- Loona 1/3
- Loona Odd Eye Circle
- Loona yyxy
- Sunye (2022–2023)
