= Loona discography =

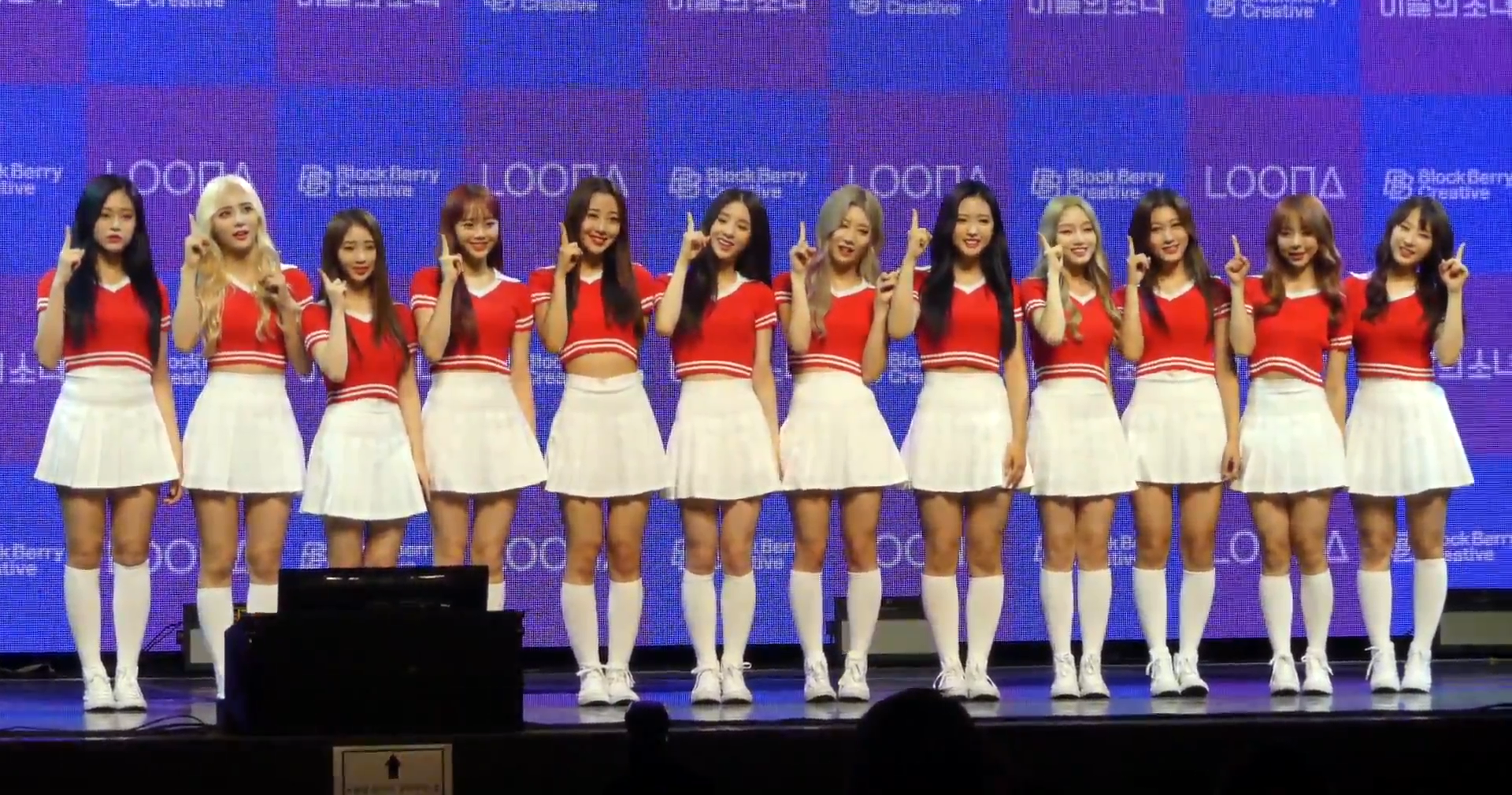
- Loona at their debut showcase in August 2018
- EPs: 5
- Singles: 11
- Single albums: 13
- Reissues: 1
- Promotional singles: 19
- Music videos: 29

The discography of the South Korean girl group Loona consists of five extended plays (EPs), thirteen single albums, and one reissue. In total, they have sold over 750,000 albums in South Korea, Japan, and the United States.

From October 2016 to March 2018, the group's label, Blockberry Creative, released twelve single albums as part of an 18-month pre-debut project, with each one being named after one of the twelve members. The single albums reached peak positions ranging from number six (HaSeul) to number 18 (HeeJin and JinSoul) on South Korea's Gaon Album Chart. The group's first 12-member release, the single "Favorite", was released in August 2018. It later appeared on [ + + ], which was released later that month with the single, "Hi High". [ + + ] peaked at number two the Gaon Album Chart and was later reissued as [X X] in February 2019 with the lead single "Butterfly". The reissue reached number four on the Gaon Album Chart, while the single became Loona's first appearance on one of Gaon's singles component charts, reaching number 90 on the Download Chart.

"365", a pre-release single for the group's second extended play [#], was released in December 2019, and reached number one on Billboard's World Digital Songs Sales chart for the United States. [#] was released in February 2020, with the single "So What". [#] reached number two on the Gaon Album Chart, with "So What" peaking at number 68 on the Gaon Download chart. Their third extended play, [12:00], was released in October 2020. It reached number four on the Gaon Album Chart and the lead single "Why Not?" peaked at number 78 on the Gaon Download Chart. In December 2020, the song "Star" – the English-language version of "Voice", an album track from [12:00] – was sent to contemporary hit radio stations in the US. It peaked at number 31 on Billboard's US Pop Airplay chart.

The group's fourth extended play [&] was released in June 2021. It peaked at number four on the Gaon Album Chart and earned the group their first entry on the Gaon Digital Chart for singles, with the lead single "Paint the Town" peaking at number 134. In September 2021, the group released their debut Japanese-language single "Hula Hoop", which peaked at number six on the Japanese Oricon Singles Chart. In April 2022, Loona released a cover of "Shake It" by Sistar – a song they performed for the competition reality show Queendom. It became Loona's second number one song on the US World Digital Songs Sales chart. In June 2022, Loona released their fifth extended play Flip That, which peaked at number four on the Gaon Album Chart. Loona released their second Japanese single "Luminous" in September 2022, peaking at number three on the Oricon Singles Chart. In December 2022, Blockberry Creative announced the group's sixth extended play The Origin Album: 0, which was slated to be released in January 2023 and would be the group's first release after member Chuu's departure. It was announced later that month that The Origin Album: 0 had been postponed indefinitely.

== Extended plays ==
List of extended plays, with selected chart positions and sales
Title	Album details	Peak chart positions										Sales
Title	Album details	KOR	CRO	HUN	JPN	POL	UK Down.	US	US Heat.	US Ind.	US World	Sales
[+ +]	Released: August 20, 2018; Label: Blockberry Creative; Formats: CD, download, streaming audio	2	—	—	—	—	—	—	4	20	4	KOR: 68,316; US: 1,000; JPN: 1,679
[#]	Released: February 5, 2020; Label: Blockberry Creative; Formats: CD, download, streaming audio	2	—	22	—	—	28	—	19	44	4	KOR: 83,522; US: 3,000; JPN: 855
[12:00]	Released: October 19, 2020; Label: Blockberry Creative; Formats: CD, download, streaming audio	4	—	—	—	—	15	112	1	23	4	KOR: 116,614; US: 14,400
[&]	Released: June 28, 2021; Label: Blockberry Creative; Formats: CD, download, streaming audio	4	—	—	46	49	21	—	24	59	14	KOR: 135,253; JPN: 648
Flip That	Released: June 20, 2022; Label: Blockberry Creative; Formats: CD, download, streaming audio	4	10	—	—	—	—	—	—	—	—	KOR: 156,907
"—" denotes releases that did not chart.

=== Reissue ===
List of reissues, with selected chart positions and sales
Title	Album details	Peak chart positions						Sales
Title	Album details	KOR	FRA Dig.	UK Down.	US Heat.	US Ind.	US World	Sales
[× ×]	Released: February 19, 2019; Label: Blockberry Creative; Formats: CD, download, streaming audio	3	55	48	8	22	4	KOR: 45,782; US: 2,000

== Single albums ==
List of single albums, with selected chart positions and sales
Title	Album details	Peak chart positions	Sales
Title	Album details	KOR	Sales
HeeJin	Released: October 5, 2016; Label: Blockberry Creative; Formats: CD, download, streaming audio	18	KOR: 7,757
HyunJin	Released: November 17, 2016; Label: Blockberry Creative; Formats: CD, download, streaming audio	12	KOR: 9,626
HaSeul	Released: December 15, 2016; Label: Blockberry Creative; Formats: CD, download, streaming audio	6	KOR: 10,982
YeoJin	Released: January 16, 2017; Label: Blockberry Creative; Formats: CD, download, streaming audio	17	KOR: 14,655
ViVi	Released: April 17, 2017; Label: Blockberry Creative; Formats: CD, download, streaming audio	14	KOR: 8,716
Kim Lip	Released: May 23, 2017; Label: Blockberry Creative; Formats: CD, download, streaming audio	13	KOR: 13,320
JinSoul	Released: June 26, 2017; Label: Blockberry Creative; Formats: CD, download, streaming audio	18	KOR: 13,631
Choerry	Released: July 28, 2017; Label: Blockberry Creative; Formats: CD, download, streaming audio	9	KOR: 10,675
Yves	Released: November 28, 2017; Label: Blockberry Creative; Formats: CD, download, streaming audio	12	KOR: 12,213
Chuu	Released: December 28, 2017; Label: Blockberry Creative; Formats: CD, download, streaming audio	8	KOR: 17,680
Go Won	Released: January 30, 2018; Label: Blockberry Creative; Formats: CD, download, streaming audio	10	KOR: 15,066
Olivia Hye	Released: March 30, 2018; Label: Blockberry Creative; Formats: CD, download, streaming audio	11	KOR: 16,971
Not Friends Special Edition	Released: November 16, 2021; Label: Big Ocean ENM; Formats: CD, download, streaming audio	3	KOR: 41,421

== Singles ==
=== As lead artist ===
List of singles, with selected chart positions, showing year released and album name
Title	Year	Peak chart positions						Sales	Album
Title	Year	KOR	KOR Hot	JPN	JPN Hot	US Pop	US World	Sales	Album
Korean
"Favorite"	2018	—	—	—	—	—	4	—N/a	[+ +]
"Hi High"	2018	—	—	—	—	—	11	—N/a	[+ +]
"Butterfly"	2019	— (Note: "Butterfly" did not enter the Gaon Digital Chart, but appeared at number 90 on the component Download chart.)	—	—	—	—	6	US: 1,000	[× ×]
"365"	2019	—	—	—	—	—	1	—N/a	[#]
"So What"	2020	— (Note: "So What" did not enter the Gaon Digital Chart, but appeared at number 68 on the component Download chart.)	89	—	—	—	4	—N/a	[#]
"Why Not?"	2020	— (Note: "Why Not?" did not enter the Gaon Digital Chart, but appeared at number 78 on the component Download chart.)	—	—	—	—	—	—N/a	[12:00]
"PTT (Paint the Town)"	2021	134	—	—	—	—	6	—N/a	[&]
"Flip That"	2022	93	—N/a	—	—	—	—	—N/a	Flip That
English
"Star"	2020	—	—	—	—	31	—	—N/a	[12:00]
Japanese
"Hula Hoop"	2021	—	—	6	38	—	—	JPN: 12,894	Non-album singles
"Star Seed"	2021	—	—	6	—	—	—	JPN: 12,894	Non-album singles
"Luminous"	2022	—	—	3	41	—	—	JPN: 11,729	Non-album singles
"—" denotes releases that did not chart.

=== Promotional singles ===
List of promotional singles, with selected chart positions, showing year released and album name
Title	Year	Recorded by	Peak chart positions		Album
Title	Year	Recorded by	KOR DL	US World	Album
"ViViD"	2016	HeeJin	—	—	HeeJin
"Around You" (다녀가요)	2016	HyunJin	—	—	HyunJin
"Let Me In" (소년, 소녀)	2016	HaSeul	—	14	HaSeul
"Kiss Later" (키스는 다음에)	2017	YeoJin	—	—	YeoJin
"Everyday I Love You"	2017	ViVi (featuring HaSeul)	—	—	ViVi
"Eclipse"	2017	Kim Lip	—	—	Kim Lip
"Singing in the Rain"	2017	JinSoul	—	—	JinSoul
"Love Cherry Motion"	2017	Choerry	—	—	Choerry
"New"	2017	Yves	—	—	Yves
"The Carol 2.0" (Note: "The Carol 2.0" recorded by ViVi, Choerry and Yves was released exclusively as a digital promotional single. The previous version of "The Carol" recorded by HeeJin, HyunJin and HaSeul is included in the HaSeul single album.)	2017	ViVi, Choerry, Yves	—	—	Non-album single
"Heart Attack"	2017	Chuu	—	—	Chuu
"One&Only"	2018	Go Won	—	—	Go Won
"Egoist"	2018	Olivia Hye (featuring JinSoul)	—	9	Olivia Hye
"Yum-Yum" (얌얌)	2021	YeoJin, Kim Lip, Choerry, Go Won	—	—	Non-album singles
"Not Friends"	2021	HeeJin, Kim Lip, JinSoul, Yves	79	7	Non-album singles
"Yummy-Yummy" (더주세요)	2021	YeoJin, Kim Lip, Choerry, Go Won	—	—	Non-album singles
"Sick Love"	2022	Kim Lip, JinSoul, Choerry, HeeJin	—	—	Non-album singles
"—" denotes releases that did not chart.

=== Soundtrack appearances ===
Title	Year	Album
"Love Battery"	2020	Immortal Song 2: Singing the Legend

=== Other charted songs ===
List of other charted songs, with selected chart positions, showing year released and album name
Title	Year	Recorded by	Peak chart positions		Album
Title	Year	Recorded by	KOR DL	US World	Album
"The Carol"	2016	HeeJin, HyunJin, HaSeul	—	5	HaSeul
"Rosy"	2018	Go Won, Olivia Hye (featuring HeeJin)	—	22	Olivia Hye
"Wow"	2021	All members	80	—	[&]
"Be Honest"	2021	All members	103	—	[&]
"Dance On My Own"	2021	All members	109	—	[&]
"A Different Night"	2021	All members	120	—	[&]
"U R"	2021	All members	123	—	[&]
"&"	2021	All members	177	—	[&]
"Shake It"	2022	All members	139	1	Queendom 2 Part.2-1
"Don't Go" (나비소녀) (with Kep1er as Sun and Moon)	2022	HaSeul, Kim Lip, JinSoul, Chuu	101	14	Queendom 2 Position Unit Battle Part.1-1
"Tell Me Now" (탐이 나) (with Brave Girls as Queen Is Me)	2022	HeeJin, Choerry, Yves, Olivia Hye	85	11	Queendom 2 Position Unit Battle Part.1-2
"Butterfly"	2022	All members	184	6	Queendom 2 Fantastic Queendom Part.1-2
"Pose"	2022	All members	63	4	Queendom 2 Final and Flip That
"Pale Blue Dot"	2022	All members	50	—	Flip That
"Need U"	2022	All members	56	—	Flip That
"Playback"	2022	All members	59	—	Flip That
"The Journey"	2022	All members	73	—	Flip That
"—" denotes releases that did not chart.

== Videography ==
Title	Year	Director(s)	Ref.
"ViViD" (HeeJin)	2016	VM Project Architecture	
"ViViD" (Acoustic Mix) (HeeJin)	2016	Vam Jins (Vam)	
"Around You" (HyunJin)	2016	Digipedi	
"I'll Be There" (HeeJin & HyunJin)	2016	Digipedi	
"Let Me in" (HaSeul)	2016	Digipedi	
"The Carol" (HeeJin, HyunJin, HaSeul)	2016	Digipedi	
"Kiss Later" (YeoJin)	2017	Digipedi	
"My Sunday" (HeeJin & HyunJin)	2017	Vam Jins (Vam)	
"My Melody" (HaSeul & YeoJin)	2017	Vam Jins (Vam)	
"Everyday I Love You" (ViVi)	2017	Digipedi	
"Everyday I Need You" (ViVi)	2017	Vam Jins (Vam)	
"Eclipse" (Kim Lip)	2017	Digipedi	
"Singing in the Rain" (JinSoul)	2017	Digipedi	
"Love Cherry Motion" (Choerry)	2017	Digipedi	
"new" (Yves)	2017	Digipedi	
"Around You" (Special Ver.) (HyunJin)	2017	Unknown	
"The Carol 2.0" (Lyric ver.) (ViVi, Choerry, Yves)	2017	Unknown	
"Heart Attack" (Chuu)	2017	Digipedi	
"One&Only" (Go Won)	2018	Digipedi	
"Egoist" (Olivia Hye)	2018	Digipedi	
"Favorite"	2018	Digipedi	
"Hi High"	2018	Digipedi	
"Butterfly"	2019	Digipedi	
"So What"	2020	Digipedi	
"Why Not?"	2020	Digipedi	
"Star"	2020	MosWantd	
"Yum-Yum" (얌얌)	2021	Unknown	
"PTT" (Paint the Town)	2021	Digipedi	
"Yummy-Yummy" (더주세요)	2021	Unknown	
"Hula Hoop"	2021		
"Flip That"	2022	Zanybros	
"Luminous"	2022	Digipedi	
