= Loona 1/3 =

Sub-unit of South Korean girl group Loona

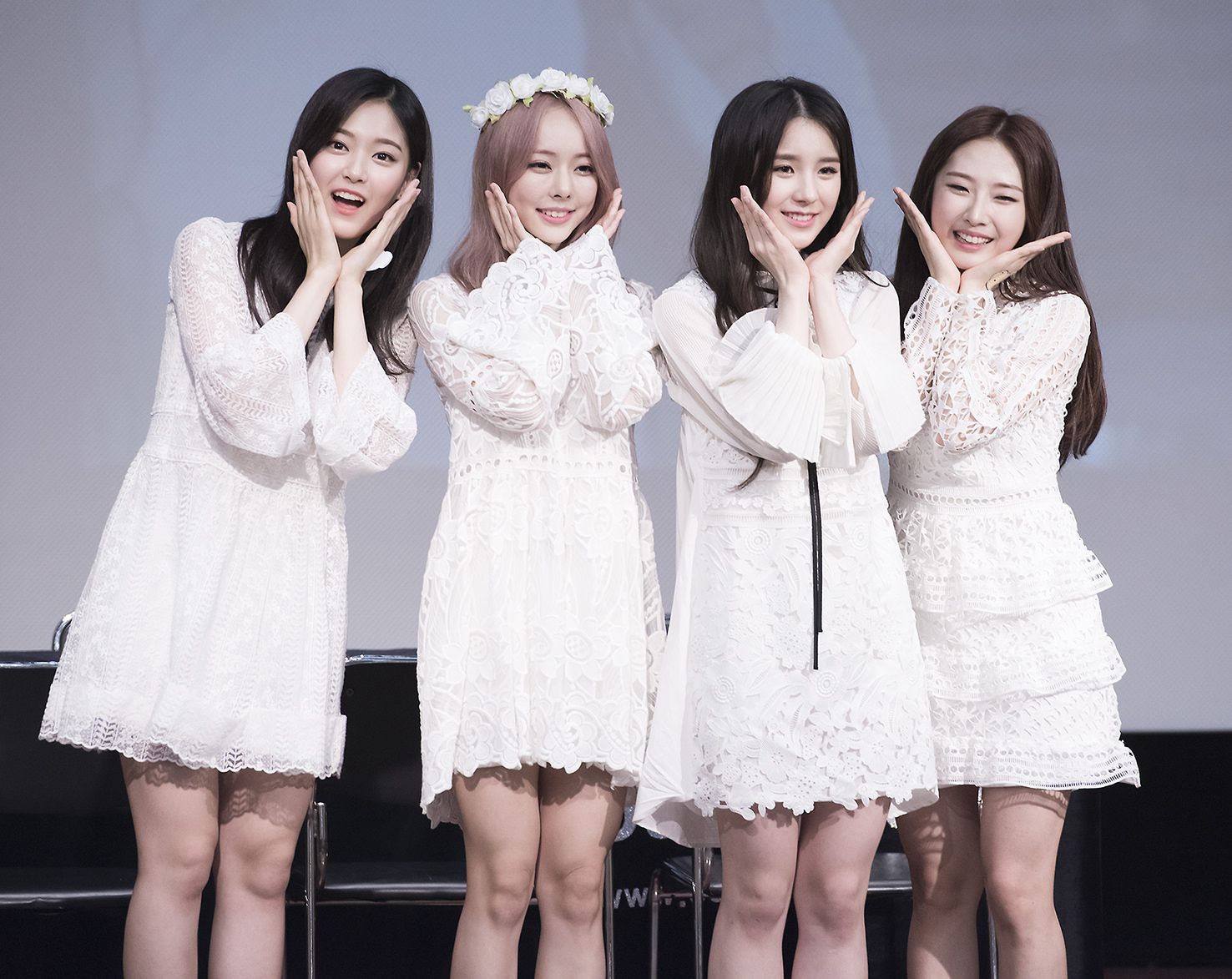
- From left to right: Hyunjin, Vivi, Heejin, and Haseul

Background information
- Origin: South Korea
- Genres: K-pop; bubblegum pop
- Years active: 2017
- Label: Blockberry Creative
- Spinoff of: Loona
- Members: Haseul; Heejin; Hyunjin; Vivi

Loona 1/3 (Korean: 이달의 소녀 1/3; commonly stylized in all caps or LOOΠΔ 1/3) is the first sub-unit of South Korean girl group Loona, formed through a pre-debut project titled "Girl of the Month". The unit consists of four members: Heejin, Hyunjin, Haseul, and Vivi. They debuted on March 13, 2017, with the extended play Love & Live.

== History ==
=== Pre-debut: Revealing of the first three members ===
The first member to be revealed is Heejin on September 26, 2016. She debuted with her single album HeeJin with the title track "ViViD" on October 5. On October 28, Hyunjin was revealed to be the second member. She debuted with her solo album titled HyunJin and the title track "Around You" on November 18. A duet between her and Heejin, titled "I'll Be There", was also released, along with a music video. The next member, Haseul, was revealed on December 8. She debuted through her single album of the same name HaSeul with the title track "Let Me In", released on December 15. Another track titled "The Carol" was released as well, with the three revealed members Heejin, Hyunjin, and Haseul.

=== 2017: Debut with Love & Live, ViVi solo album, and Love & Evil ===
On March 12, 2017, The sub-unit made their first live appearance on SBS's Inkigayo, performing both "You and Me Together" and "Love&Live". A day later, on March 13, they officially debuted with the release of their extended play Love & Live, featuring Heejin, Hyunjin, Haseul, and Vivi. On April 5, ViVi was officially revealed as the fifth member of Loona. Then, she released a solo album named ViVi with the title track "Everyday I Love You", featuring Haseul, on April 17. The sub-unit supposedly cost 4 million dollars to produce, with the music video for their title track being filmed in New Zealand and Hong Kong.

A reissue of their extended play Love & Live, titled Love & Evil was released on April 27 with the addition of two tracks and the new lead single "Sonatine".

== Members ==
- Haseul (하슬) – leader
- Heejin (희진)
- Hyunjin (현진)
- Vivi (비비)

== Discography ==
=== Extended plays ===
List of extended plays, with selected details, chart positions and sales
Title	Details	Peak chart positions	Sales
Title	Details	KOR	Sales
Love & Live	Released: March 13, 2017; Label: Blockberry Creative; Formats: CD, digital download, streaming	10	KOR: 7,130

=== Reissues ===
List of extended plays, with selected details, chart positions and sales
Title	Details	Peak chart positions		Sales
Title	Details	KOR	US World	Sales
Love & Evil	Released: April 27, 2017; Label: Blockberry Creative; Formats: CD, digital download, streaming	24	12	KOR: 5,924

=== Singles ===
List of singles, showing year released and album name
Title	Year	Album
"Love&Live" (지금, 좋아해)	2017	Love & Live
"Sonatine" (알 수 없는 비밀)	2017	Love & Evil

== Videography ==
=== Music videos ===
Song title	Year	Director(s)	Ref.
"Love&Live"	2017	Digipedi	
"You and Me Together" (Special MV)	2017	Digipedi	
"Sonatine"	2017	Digipedi	
"Rain 51db"	2017	Digipedi	
