= Heejin =

South Korean singer (born 2000)

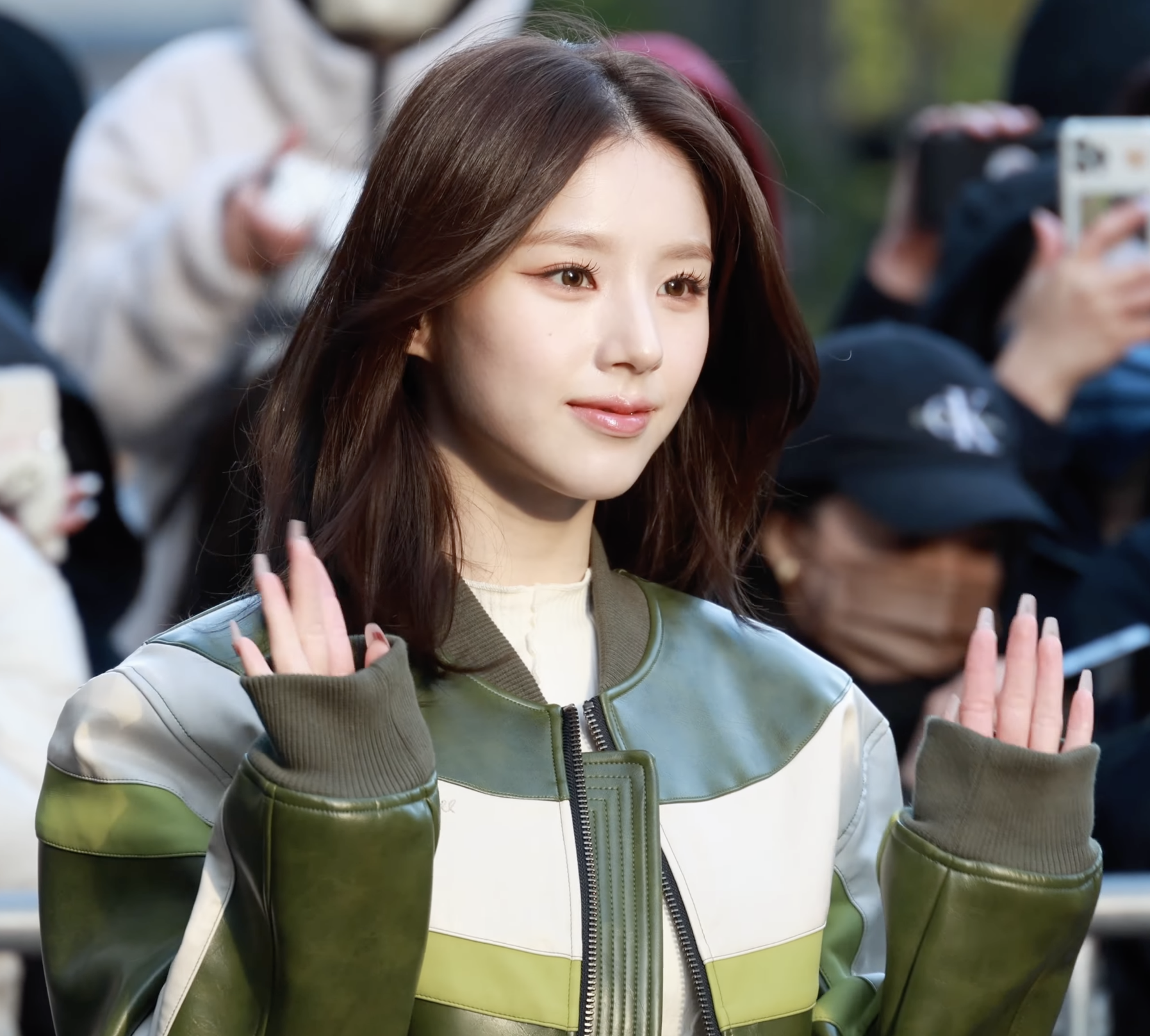
- Heejin in November 2023
- Born: Jeon Hee-jin; October 19, 2000 (age 26); Daejeon, South Korea
- Occupation: Singer
- Musical career
- Genre: K-pop
- Instrument: Vocals
- Years active: 2016–present
- Labels: Blockberry Creative; Modhaus
- Member of: Loona; Loona 1/3; Artms

Korean name
- Hangul: 전희진
- Hanja: 田姬振
- RR: Jeon Huijin
- MR: Chŏn Hŭijin

Jeon Hee-jin (Korean: 전희진; pronounced [tɕʌn çidʑin]; born October 19, 2000), known mononymously as Heejin (occasionally stylized as HeeJin) is a South Korean singer. She is a member of Loona, its sub-unit Loona 1/3, and Artms. She released her debut extended play K on October 31, 2023.

== Early life ==
Heejin was born on October 19, 2000, in Daejeon, South Korea. She is the youngest of three daughters, and her two older sisters supported her ambition to become a singer. She enjoyed dancing from a young age and said that learning dance and performing on stage inspired her ambition to become a singer. She later recalled wanting to become an idol since sixth grade. During her first year of middle school, she lived in Nonsan, South Chungcheong Province, and traveled to Daejeon to attend dance classes because, according to her, there was no dance academy in Nonsan.

During her childhood, Heejin also lived for a period in São Paulo, Brazil.

Beginning in her first year of middle school, Heejin traveled from Nonsan to Seoul to audition for various entertainment agencies. She later recalled failing nearly 20 auditions before becoming a trainee. Despite the fact that her father opposed her ambition to become an idol, her mother initially kept her auditions secret from him, but eventually encouraged her to stop after repeated rejections. At this time, one of her older sisters, who was attending high school, helped pay for her transportation using money earned from a part-time job. Heejin recalled that a round trip to Seoul cost approximately ₩50,000. When her parents stopped paying for her dance lessons, a friend helped cover the academy fees. She subsequently began training with Blockberry Creative after photographs she had posted on Instagram led to contact with the agency. She trained for approximately a year and a half before her debut in October 2016.

Heejin attended Hansung Girls' High School in Seoul alongside fellow Loona member Hyunjin. Both graduated on January 7, 2019.

== Career ==
=== 2016–2022: Debut with Loona and Mix Nine ===
On September 26, 2016, Blockberry Creative announced that Heejin was going to be the first member of their upcoming girl group Loona. As part of the group's pre-debut release strategy, Heejin then went on to release her self-titled single album alongside its single "Vivid" on October 5.

In November 2016, Heejin was featured on the song "I'll Be There" on the debut single album of Loona member HyunJin. The two also later featured on the song "The Carol", which was released as part of Loona member Haseul's debut single album in December, 2016. In January 2017, Heejin would collaborate again with Hyunjin for the song "My Sunday" which was released as part of Loona member Yeojin's debut single album.

On February 14, 2017, Heejin was announced to debut in Loona's first sub-unit Loona 1/3 alongside members Haseul, Hyunjin, and Vivi. They subsequently debuted on March 13 with their mini album Love & Live. In October, Heejin auditioned alongside members Haseul, and Hyunjin for the survival reality show Mix Nine. She passed the audition, and went on as a participant until the final episode, where she finished 4th amongst the female participants.

On March 30, 2018, Heejin featured on the song "Rosy" alongside her members Go Won and Hyeju, which was part of the latter's debut single album. Heejin officially debuted with Loona as a full group on August 20, 2018, with the release of their debut EP [+ +].

On November 28, 2022, JTBC Entertainment News reported that nine members of Loona, including Heejin, had filed an application for a provisional injunction to suspend their exclusive contract with Blockberry Creative, following member Chuu's expulsion three days earlier.

=== 2023–present: Solo activities and re-debut with Artms ===
On January 13, 2023, it was reported that Heejin, alongside Odd Eye Circle members Kim Lip, Jinsoul, and Choerry, had been granted a preliminary injunction against her contract with Blockberry Creative. On March 17, Heejin signed an exclusive contract with Modhaus, an agency founded by Loona's former creative director Jaden Jeong On April 1, Heejin was announced as a member of Artms along with other Loona members Kim Lip, Jinsoul, and Choerry. She made her solo debut with the extended play K on October 31. The English and rock versions of the lead single "Algorithm" were released on September 23, 2024.

On November 13, 2025, Heejin released the digital single "Savior" (stylized as "sAvioR"), a rock song, accompanied by a music video.

== Discography ==
=== Extended plays ===
List of extended plays, showing selected details, selected chart positions, and sales figures
Title	Details	Peak chart positions	Sales
Title	Details	KOR	Sales
K	Released: October 31, 2023; Label: Modhaus; Formats: CD, digital download, streaming	14	KOR: 25,666

=== Singles ===
List of singles as lead artist, showing year released, selected chart positions, and name of the album
Title	Year	Peak chart positions	Album
Title	Year	KOR DL	Album
"ViViD" (Note: credited to Loona, but the track is a solo by Heejin)	2016	—	HeeJin
"Like A Star" (이 밤이 지나면) (as Excellent Vibe)	2018	—	Mix Nine Part 4
"Come to Play" (놀러와) (as Our Home)	2018	—	Mix Nine Part 6
"Honestly"	2022	—	Non-album single
"Algorithm"	2023	132	K
"Savior"	2025	—	Non-album single
"—" denotes releases that did not chart or were not released in that region.

=== Soundtrack appearances ===
List of soundtrack appearances, showing year released, and name of the album
Title	Year	Peak chart positions	Album
Title	Year	KOR BGM	Album
"Masquerade" (with Jinsoul)	2022	—	Tracer Original Soundtrack
"Love Me Too"	2025	87	Kick Kick Kick Kick Original Soundtrack
"Had to Erase All My Memories"	2026	—	Before We Knew Original Soundtrack

=== Songwriting credits ===
All songwriting credits are adapted from the Korea Music Copyright Association's database.

Title	Year	Artist	Album
"Algorithm"	2023	Heejin	K
"Video Game"	2023	Heejin	K
"Nokia"	2023	Heejin	K
"Addiction"	2023	Heejin	K
"Sparkle"	2024	Artms	DALL
"Goddess"	2025	Artms	Club Icarus
"Savior"	2025	Heejin	Non-album single

== Videography ==
=== Music videos ===
Title	Year	Director(s)	Ref.
"Algorithm"	2023	Kim Sunung (Kings Creative Lab)	
"Savior"	2025	Unknown	

=== Music video appearances ===
Year	Song title	Artist	Ref.
2020	"Bad"	Ben	
2021	"I Should Not Have Loved You"	DinDin, Min Kyung-hoon	

== Filmography ==
=== Web series ===
Year	Title	Role	Ref.
2017–2018	Do You Remember When We First Met?	Jeon Heejin	
2023	Convenience Store Baejjangie	Sarang	
2025	Idol ABC Tour	Herself	

=== Television shows ===
Year	Title	Role	Notes	Ref.
2017–2018	Mix Nine	Contestant	Placed 4th	
