= TDYA =

South Korean girl group

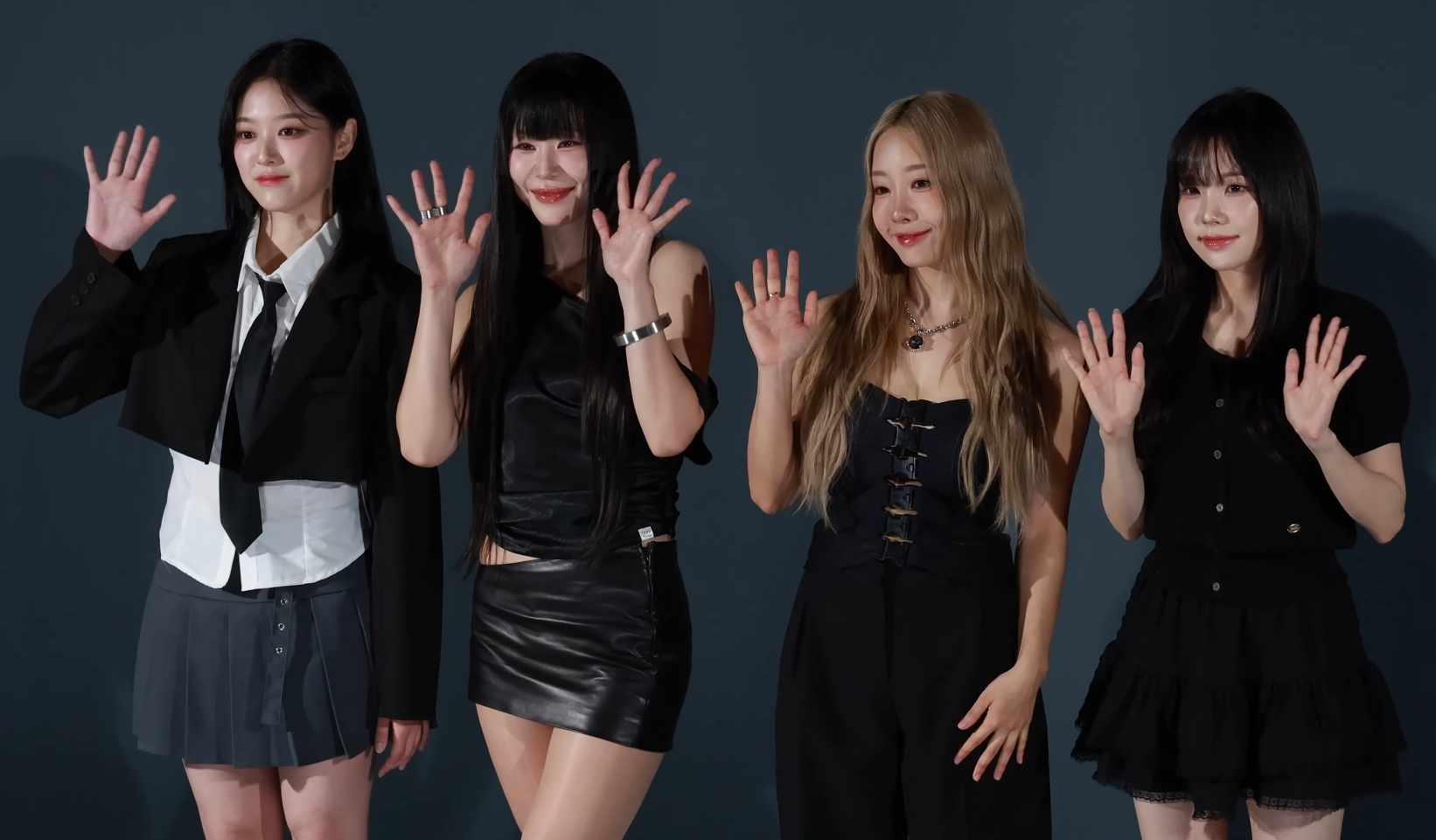
- TDYA in 2025; L–R: Hyunjin, Mirani, Amy Park, and Friendshiping

Background information
- Origin: Seoul, South Korea
- Genres: K-pop
- Years active: 2025
- Members: Friendshiping; Amy Park; Mirani; Hyunjin

TDYA (Korean: 투데이야) was a South Korean project girl group. The group consisted of four members: YouTuber Friendshiping, dancer Amy Park, rapper Mirani, and singer Hyunjin of the girl groups Loona and Loossemble. The group was formed through Studio USOG's web variety show Another Day of Debut Training. They debuted in August 2025 with the single "Keep the Light" composed by singer-songwriter Ejae and written by Mirani to celebrate the 80th National Liberation Day of Korea.

== Career ==
On July 3, 2025, YouTube channel Studio USOG introduced the web series Another Day of Debut Training in collaboration with the Ministry of Patriots and Veterans Affairs. The show follows content creator Friendshiping on her path to debut in a K-pop group which will perform at a festival to celebrate the 80th anniversary of South Korea's independence. On July 16, Amy Park, Mirani, and Hyunjin were revealed as the other members of the group and then joined the web series in its third episode.

The members chose the name TDYA from the word "today", reflecting on how their lives have been shaped by the efforts of Korean independence activists. On July 23, the project announced that singer-songwriter Ejae would contribute a song to the project and all profits from the song would be donated to the descendants of Korean independence activists.

On August 14, The group released their debut single "Keep the Light", with lyrics written by Mirani and choreography by Amy Park. On August 15, the group performed the song for the first time at Gwanghwamun Square in Jongno-gu, Seoul, in a set of performances celebrating the 80th National Liberation Day of Korea. On September 5, TDYA concluded their activities with the release of the tenth and final episode of Another Day of Debut Training.

== Members ==
- Friendshiping (우정잉) – leader
- Amy Park (에이미박)
- Mirani (미란이)
- Hyunjin (현진)

== Discography ==
=== Singles ===
List of singles as lead artist, showing year released, chart positions, and name of the album
| Title | Year | Peak chart positions | Album |
| Title | Year | KOR Down. | Album |
|---|---|---|---|
| "Keep the Light" (꺼지지 않는 빛) | 2025 | 174 | Non-album single |

== Filmography ==
=== Web series ===
| Year | Title | Platform | Note(s) |
|---|---|---|---|
| 2025 | Another Day of Debut Training | YouTube | Follows the formation and debut of TDYA |

== Videography ==
=== Music videos ===
List of music videos, showing year released
| Title | Year | Ref. |
|---|---|---|
| "Keep the Light" (꺼지지 않는 빛) | 2025 | |
