= Hyunjin (Loona singer) =

South Korean singer (born 2000)

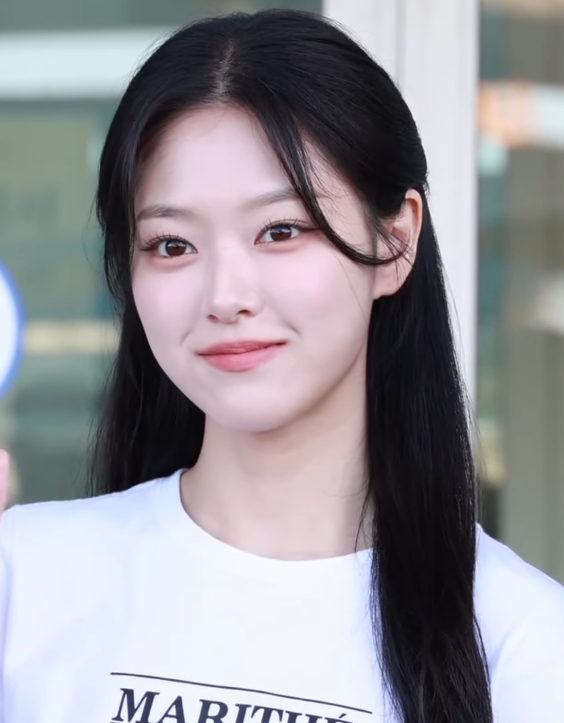
- Hyunjin in September 2023
- Born: Kim Hyun-jin; November 15, 2000 (age 25); Seoul, South Korea
- Occupation: Singer
- Musical career
- Genre: K-pop
- Instruments: Vocals; drums
- Years active: 2016–present
- Labels: Blockberry Creative; CTDENM; Triangle ENM; Oddinary Records
- Member of: Loona; Loona 1/3; Loossemble; TDYA
- Formerly of: Latency

Korean name
- Hangul: 김현진
- RR: Gim Hyeonjin
- MR: Kim Hyŏnjin

Kim Hyun-jin (Korean: 김현진, Korean pronunciation: [kimçʌndʑin]; born November 15, 2000), known mononymously as Hyunjin (occasionally stylized as HyunJin) is a South Korean singer and drummer. She is a member of Loona, its sub-unit Loona 1/3, and leader of its spinoff Loossemble. She was also the drummer for the band Latency until her departure in May 2026 for health reasons.

== Early life ==
Kim Hyun-jin was born on November 15, 2000, in Dunchon-dong, Gangdong District, Seoul, South Korea. She has two older brothers. One brother is a vocalist for the band BI-O-NE, and the other is an actor. She graduated from Hansung Girls High School in 2019.

In 2013, when she was thirteen years old, Hyunjin appeared on the 40th episode of Three Idiots, a Korean reality TV show. She was introduced as a natural beauty and demonstrated her skills in skipping rope.

== Career ==
=== 2016–2022: Debut with Loona and TV show appearances ===
On October 23, 2016, the first "Who's Next Girl?" teaser was posted by Blockberry Creative, and Hyunjin was fully revealed as the second member of Loona on October 28. She released her debut single album HyunJin with her solo single "Around You" and second track "I'll Be There" featuring first member Heejin on November 17. In December, the two were featured on third Loona member Haseul's debut single album for the song "The Carol".

On January 16, 2017, Hyunjin collaborated again with Heejin on the song "My Sunday", released on fourth Loona member Yeojin's debut single album. On February 14, Hyunjin was revealed to be a member of Loona's first sub-unit Loona 1/3. The group debuted on March 13 with their extended play Love & Live. In October, Hyunjin, alongside fellow Loona members Heejin and Haseul, auditioned for the survival reality show Mix Nine. Hyunjin passed the audition and became a contestant as a representative of BlockBerry Creative and Loona. She made it to the final episode, but was eliminated and did not make the final lineup.

On August 20, 2018, Hyunjin officially debuted with Loona as a full group with the release of their debut extended play [+ +]. On September 27, 2020, Hyunjin appeared on South Korean television program King of Masked Singer as a contestant with the stage name Jade Bead. In November 2022, Hyunjin appeared as a panelist for MBC's 2022 FIFA World Cup Qatar preview show Catharsis until being suddenly absent from the program starting November 27.

=== 2023–2024: Legal disputes, CTDENM, and debut with Loossemble ===
On February 3, 2023, Hyunjin and fellow Loona member ViVi filed lawsuits to terminate their contracts with their company BlockBerry Creative. On May 9, the two won their injunctions against BlockBerry Creative and terminated their exclusive contracts. On June 12, Hyunjin and ViVi officially signed with CTDENM, a newly formed company founded by BlockBerry Creative's former planning division director Yoon Doyeon.

On August 2, Hyunjin was revealed as an official member of Loossemble, alongside Loona members ViVi, Go Won, Yeojin, and Hyeju, with Hyunjin as the leader. The group debuted on September 15, with their self-titled extended play.

On November 29, 2024, CTDENM announced that the Loossemble members' exclusive contracts with the label had ended.

=== 2025–present: Solo activities, self-management, TDYA, and Latency ===
On June 14, 2025, Hyunjin announced her first fan meeting to be held at K-Pop Stage in Hongdae, Seoul on June 20, with tickets selling out quickly after opening. That same month, Hyunjin founded her own independent artist label named Triangle ENM. She stated the name came from the vertices of a triangle representing the self, reality, and one's dreams, and that she plans to recruit other artists in the future. Hyunjin also announced that she was joining a band project as the drummer alongside former Cignature member Jeewon with an album planned.

On July 16, 2025, Hyunjin was revealed as a participant in YouTube channel Studio USOG's web variety show Another Day of Debut Training. On August 14, through the show, Hyunjin debuted as a member of TDYA with the single "Keep the Light" composed by singer-songwriter Ejae and written by fellow TDYA member Mirani. On August 15, the group performed the song for the first time at Gwanghwamun Square in Jongno-gu, Seoul in a set of performances celebrating the 80th National Liberation Day of Korea.

On October 15, the web series Motchuh Do Rock! began, following Hyunjin as a drummer forming the band Latency alongside YouTuber Fingerstylish, also known as Heeyeon, and Cignature members Jeewon, Semi, and Haeun. On November 18, Oddinary Records announced Latency would debut in January 2026. Latency debuted on January 8, 2026 with "It Was Love".

On May 22, Hyunjin announced she was withdrawing from Latency to focus on her health.

== Discography ==
=== Singles ===
List of singles as lead artist, showing year released and name of the album
Title	Year	Album
"Around You" (Note: credited to Loona, but the track is a solo by Hyunjin)	2016	HyunJin
"Like A Star" (이 밤이 지나면) (as Excellent Vibe)	2018	Mix Nine Part 4
"OMG" (어머나/OMONA) (as Universe)	2018	Mix Nine Part 6
"Thank You"	2024	Non-album single

=== Songwriting credits ===
All credits are adapted from the Korea Music Copyright Association, unless cited otherwise.

Song	Year	Artist	Album
"Day by Day"	2023	Loossemble	Loossemble
"Starlight"	2024	Loossemble	One of a Kind
"Confessions (Cotton Candy)"	2024	Loossemble	TTYL
"Starry Night"	2026	Latency	Late O'Clock

== Filmography ==
=== Television shows ===
Year	Name	Role	Notes	Ref.
2017–2018	Mix Nine	Contestant		
2020	King of Mask Singer	Contestant	Episodes 273 and 274	
2022	Catharsis/Qatarsis (카타르시스)	Panelist		

=== Web series ===
Year	Name	Role	Ref.
2017–2018	Do You Remember When We First Met?	Kim HyunJin	
2025	Another Day of Debut Training	Herself	
2025-2026	Motchuh Do Rock!	Herself	
2025-2026	Shooting Stars (골때녀)	Herself	

=== Music video appearances ===
Year	Name	Artist	Ref.
2017	Better Than Me	Sojung	
2024	Still Yours	Parc Jae-jung	

== Awards and nominations ==
Name of the award ceremony, year presented, category, and the result of the nomination
Award ceremony	Year	Category	Result	Ref.
Korea Best Brand Awards	2025	Female Rookie Singer	Won	
