= Loossemble (EP) =

- Digital cover

EP by Loossemble
- Released: September 15, 2023
- Length: 23:01
- Language: Korean
- Labels: CTDENM; Warner Music

Loossemble chronology
Loossemble (2023)	One of a Kind (2024)

Singles from Loossemble
- 1. "Sensitive" Released: September 15, 2023

Professional ratings
Review scores
Source	Rating
NME	4/5 stars

Loossemble is the self-titled debut extended play by South Korean girl group Loossemble. It was released by CTDENM on September 15, 2023, and contains eight tracks, including the lead single "Sensitive".

== Background and release ==
On August 23, 2023, CTDENM announced that Loossemble would be releasing their self-titled debut extended play on September 15. The promotional schedule was also released in the same day. On September 7, the track listing was released with "Sensitive" announced as the lead single. The music video teasers for "Sensitive" was released on September 11, and September 13. On September 14, the highlight medley teaser video was released. The extended play was released alongside the music video for "Sensitive" on September 15.

== Composition ==
"Intro: Searching for Their Friends" is a short 40 second remix of "Sensitive", as is tradition with Loona's group remixes. "Sensitive" features vocal chops and bass guitar plucks.

== Track listing ==
Track listing for Loossemble
No.	Title	Lyrics	Music	Arrangement	Length
1.	"Intro: Searching for Their Friends"		OUOW	OUOW	0:42
2.	"Sensitive"	Hwang Yu-bin (XYXX)	C'SA; Clovd (WSHL:ST); Kwon Deok-geun (WSHL:ST); Puff	Clovd (WSHL:ST); Kwon Deok-geun (WSHL:ST); Puff	3:05
3.	"Real World"	Kim Sung-hee (Jam Factory); Jang Da-in (PNP); Lee Yeon-ji (PNP); Kim Anna (PNP); Hyeju; Je Na-bin (Jam Factory); C'SA	C'SA; Strawberrybananaclub	Strawberrybananaclub	3:11
4.	"Colouring"	Choi Eun-you (Jam Factory); Oni (PNP); Jo Ah-ra (Jam Factory); Hwa Im-hyun (PNP); Kim Na-hee (Jam Factory); Kim Hyun-kyung (Jam Factory); Vivi; Yeojin; Meansof (PNP)	Phil Schwan; J.Lu (OceanCave); Jsong (OceanCave)	Phil Schwan; J.Lu (OceanCave)	3:11
5.	"Newtopia"	Kyung Jin-hee (Jam Factory); Lee Da-eum (PNP); Yoon Ye-ji (PNP); Gowon	Kloe; Samuel Preston; Alex Smith	Samuel Preston; Alex Smith	3:35
6.	"Strawberry Soda"	Yves	Kim Min-gu (Nine); Lee Ye-jun (Nine); Min!n' (Nine); Yves; Do Min-gyu	Lee Ye-jun (Nine); Do Min-gyu; Kim Min-gu (Nine)	3:03
7.	"Day by Day"	Hyunjin	C'SA; Bymore	Bymore	3:12
8.	"Sensitive" (English Version)	Livy	C'SA; Clovd (WSHL:ST); Kwon Deok-geun (WSHL:ST); Puff	Clovd (WSHL:ST); Kwon Deok-geun (WSHL:ST); Puff	3:05
Total length:					23:01

Notes

- "Real World" samples composition Rhapsody in Blue by George Gershwin.

== Credits and personnel ==
Credits adapted from Melon.

Studio

- Doobdoob Studio – recording (track 2, 7–8), digital editing (track 7)
- Vibe Music Studio 606 – recording (track 3–6)
- ONR Studio - mixing (track 1), digital editing (track 2, 8)
- 821 Sound – mixing (track 3–4)
- Koko Sound Studio – mixing (track 4, 6)
- Dream Factory – mixing (track 4, 6)
- Hitmanic Soundz – mixing (track 5)
- InGrid Studio – mixing (track 7)
- 821 Sound Mastering – mastering (track 2–8)
- Nine Studio – digital editing (track 6)

Personnel

- Loossemble – vocals (track 2–8)
  - Hyeju – lyrics (track 3)
  - Vivi – lyrics (track 4)
  - Yeojin – lyrics (track 4)
  - Gowon – lyrics (track 5)
  - Hyunjin – lyrics (track 6)
- Livy – background vocals (track 2, 8), English lyrics (track 8)
- C'SA – background vocals (track 3), lyrics (track 3), composition (track 2–3, 7–8), vocal directing (track 3), digital editing (track 3)
- Sophia Pae – background vocals (track 4–5)
- Perrie (153/Joombas) – background vocals (track 6)
- Kim Yeon-seo – background vocals, vocal directing (track 7)
- Hwang Yu-bin (XYXX) – lyrics (track 2)
- Kim Sung-hee (JamFactory) – lyrics (track 3)
- Jang Da-in (PNP) – lyrics (track 3)
- Lee Yeon-ji (PNP) – lyrics (track 3)
- Kim Anna (PNP) – lyrics (track 3)
- Je Na-bin (JamFactory) – lyrics (track 3)
- Choi Eun-you (JamFactory) – lyrics (track 4)
- Oni (PNP) – lyrics (track 4)
- Jo Ah-ra (JamFactory) – lyrics (track 4)
- Hwa Im-hyun (PNP) – lyrics (track 4)
- Kim Na-hee (JamFactory) – lyrics (track 4)
- Kim Hyun-kyung (JamFactory) – lyrics (track 4)
- Meansof (PNP) – lyrics (track 4)
- Kyung Jin-hee (JamFactory) – lyrics (track 5)
- Lee Da-eum (PNP) – lyrics (track 5)
- Yoon Ye-ji (PNP) – lyrics (track 5)
- Yves – lyrics, composition, vocal directing (track 6)
- OUOW – composition, arrangement (track 1)
- Clovd (WSHL:ST) – composition, arrangement (track 2, 8)
- Kwon Deok-geun (WSHL:ST) – composition, arrangement (track 2, 8)
- Puff – composition, arrangement (track 2, 8)
- Strawberrybananaclub – composition, arrangement, vocal directing (track 3)
- Phil Schwan – composition, arrangement, computer programming, instruments (track 4)
- J.Lu (OceanCave) – composition, arrangement, computer programming, instruments (track 4)
- Jsong (OceanCave) – composition (track 4)
- Kloe – composition (track 5)
- Samuel Preston – composition, arrangement (track 5)
- Alex Smith – composition, arrangement (track 5)
- Kim Min-gu (Nine) – composition, arrangement, vocal directing (track 6)
- Lee Ye-jun (Nine) – composition, arrangement, vocal directing, guitar, drum, keyboard (track 6)
- Min!n' (Nine) – composition, vocal directing (track 6)
- Do Min-gyu – composition, arrangement, keyboard (track 6)
- Bymore – composition, arrangement (track 7)
- Taeseok – vocal directing (track 2, 8)
- Jae Do-ji – vocal directing (track 4–5)
- Jang Woo-young – recording (track 2, 8)
- Kwon Kwon-jin – recording (track 2, 7–8), digital editing (track 7)
- Kim Ji-hyun – recording (track 2, 8)
- Jeong Mo-yeon – recording (track 3–6)
- Lee Kang-hyun – recording (track 3–6)
- Lee Yu-na – recording (track 3–6)
- Kim Bo-seong – mixing (track 2, 8)
- Master Key – mixing (track 3)
- Go Hyeon-jeong – mixing (track 4, 6)
- Kim Jung-sang – mixing (assistant) (track 4, 6)
- Ji Min-woo – mixing (assistant) (track 4, 6)
- Kim Jun-young – mixing (assistant) (track 4, 6)
- Hitmanic – mixing (track 5)
- Jeong Eun-kyung – mixing (track 7)
- Kwon Nam-woo – mastering (track 2–8)
- Ahn Chang-gyu – digital editing (track 2, 8)
- Sam Carter – digital editing (track 4–5)
- Chae Soo-seong – digital editing (track 6)
- Yundak – drum, string, keyboard (track 1)
- Ryu Seung-hoon – guitar (track 2, 8)
- Kim Dong-seong – bass (track 2, 8)
- Cho Yong-ho – synth (track 2, 8)
- Shin Eun-ji – vocal synth (track 2, 8)
- Mopin – drum, bass, keyboard (track 7)
- Kim Jin-sol – drum, bass, keyboard (track 7)
- Choi Young-hoon – guitar (track 7)

== Charts ==
=== Weekly charts ===
Weekly chart performance for Loossemble
Chart (2023)	Peak position
South Korean Albums (Circle)	6
UK Album Downloads (Official Charts)	66

=== Monthly charts ===
Monthly chart performance for Loossemble
Chart (2023)	Position
South Korean Albums (Circle)	18

== Release history ==
Release history for Loossemble
Region	Date	Format	Label
South Korea	September 15, 2023	CD	CTDENM; Warner Music
Various	September 15, 2023	Digital download; streaming	CTDENM; Warner Music
