= Dunchon-dong =

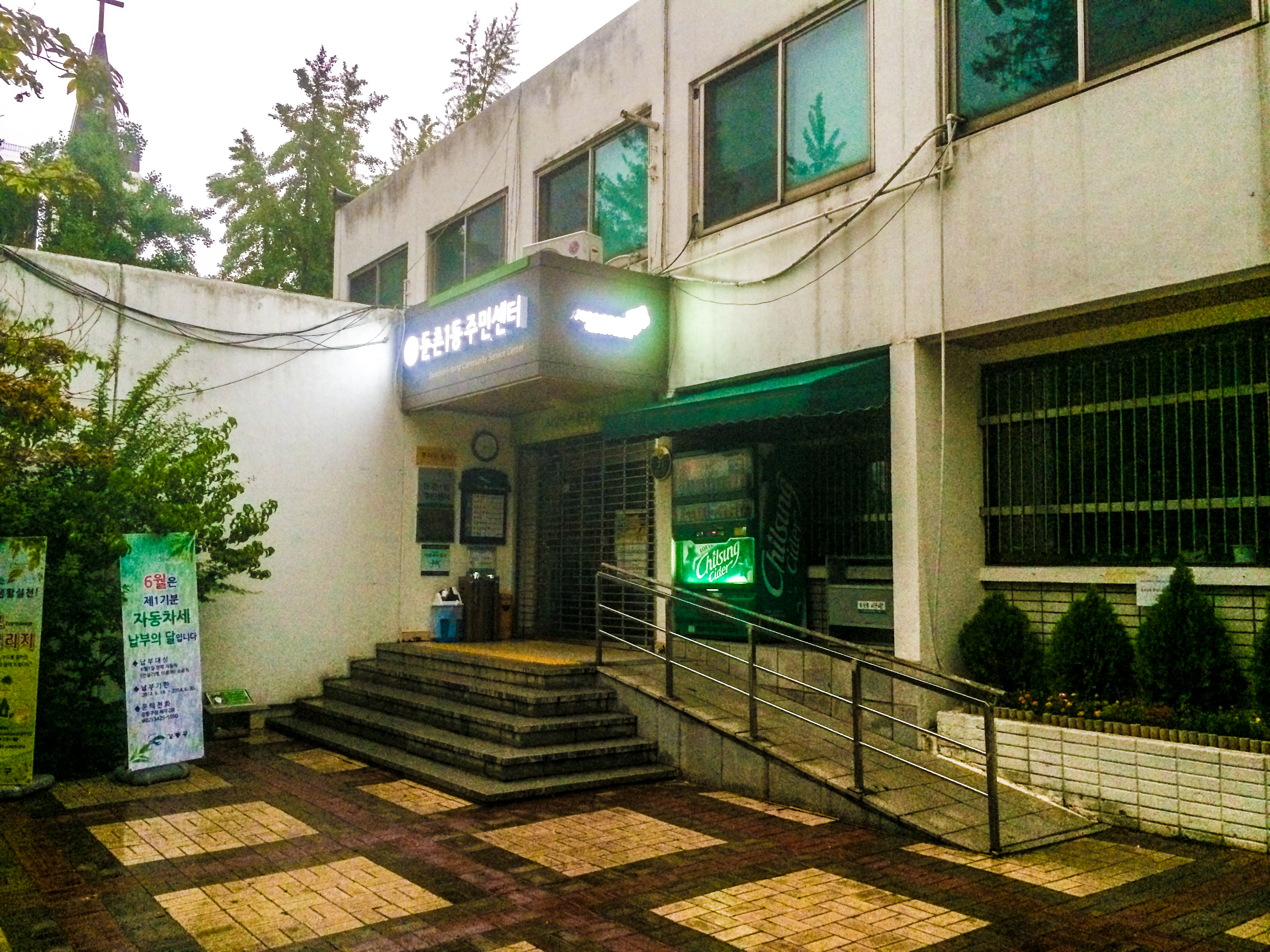
- Dunchon 1(il)-dong Community Service Center
- Country: South Korea

Area
  - Total: 1.90 km^{2} (0.73 sq mi)

Population (2001)
  - Total: 53,383
  - Density: 28,096/km^{2} (72,770/sq mi)

Korean name
- Hangul: 둔촌동
- Hanja: 遁村洞
- RR: Dunchon-dong
- MR: Tunch'on-dong

Dunchon-dong (Korean: 둔촌동) is a dong (neighborhood) of Gangdong District, Seoul, South Korea.

== Notable people ==
- Kim Hyunjin, singer, member of girl groups Loona and Loossemble and founder of Triangle ENM

== See also ==
- Administrative divisions of South Korea
