= Love & Live (EP) =

2017 extended play by Loona 1/3

- Digital and Limited cover

EP by Loona 1/3 / Loona
- Released: March 13, 2017
- Genres: Dance pop; pop
- Length: 14:01
- Language: Korean
- Labels: Blockberry Creative; CJ E&M

Loona 1/3 / Loona chronology
YeoJin (2017)	Love & Live (2017)	ViVi (2017)

Singles from Love & Live
- 1. "Love & Live" Released: March 13, 2017

Alternative artwork
- Normal cover

Music video
- "지금, 좋아해(Love&Live)” on YouTube

Love & Live is the debut extended play by South Korean girl group Loona 1/3, a sub-unit of Loona (Idalui Sonyeo; lit. "Girl of the Month") consisting of members HeeJin, HyunJin, HaSeul, and ViVi. It was released on March 13, 2017, by Blockberry Creative and distributed by CJ E&M. The album contains five tracks, including the title track of the same name. The repackage, Love & Evil, was released on April 27, 2017, and contains seven to eight tracks, including three new tracks and, depending on the version, a remix of either "Love & Live" or "You and Me Together".

== Promotion and release ==
A preview for the song "Valentine Girl" was released on February 13, preceded by two teasers announcing the creation of the sub-unit. A preview of the album was released on the group's official YouTube channel on March 10. Promotions began on March 12 on SBS's Inkigayo.

Loona 1/3, consisting of members HeeJin, HyunJin, HaSeul, and new member, ViVi, released Love & Live, accompanied by the title track of the same name on March 13.

A special music video for the song "You and Me Together" featuring backstage footage for the "Love&Live" music video was released on March 20.

Love & Live has been self-described as "filled with sense of youthful love, to express palpitating emotions in the boundaries of contemporary K-pop girl group music of 2017."

== Love&Evil ==
On April 23, 2017, it was announced that a repackaged version of the mini-album was released on April 27, 2017 under the title Love&Evil with three new tracks and remixed versions of "Love&Live (지금, 좋아해)" and "You and Me Together". The remixes are only available on the physical CD.

The repackage version is self-described as "a [sic] inverted version of the album. As suggested by the word 'Evil,' which is a reversely-spelled word from 'Live,' which was planned beforehand during production, is filled with pain and worries in the process of love, in the opposite characteristics of the prior record." The booklet photo shoot was done in Prague, Czech Republic.

Love & Evil
- Digital and Limited cover

EP by Loona 1/3
- Released: April 27, 2017
- Genre: Pop
- Length: 20:30
- Language: Korean
- Labels: Blockberry Creative; CJ E&M

Singles from Love & Evil
- 1. "Sonatine" Released: April 26, 2017

Alternative artwork
- Normal cover

Music video
- "알 수 없는 비밀(Sonatine)" on YouTube

=== Songs ===
Loona self-describes the new songs of Love&Evil, "Love&Evil," "Sonatine," and "Rain 51db," as:

“Is love something sweet? Or is it something cruel?”

It might be a question too difficult for young girls to answer yet. The title track ‘Sonatine (알 수 없는 비밀)’ takes the encounters of love away towards the adolescence of the girls. While ‘Love&Live (지금, 좋아해)’ was a typical K-pop girl group track with lovely emotions, ‘Sonatine (알 수 없는 비밀)’ mesmerizes the audience with mystical melodies unexpected for a K-pop girl group.

The intro track ‘Love & Evil’ produced by SWEETCH materializes a girl who is lost alone in a dark forest. With the piano played in Accelerando, the girl runs away deeper into the forest.

The album continues with a newly released track, ‘Rain 51db (비의 목소리 51db)’ which is an homage to the first generation K-pop girl groups, S.E.S and Fin.K.L. It also shows their love towards themselves, trying to revitalize the sentiments of the golden era. Like ViVi’s previous attempt in ‘Everyday I Love You’, LOOΠΔ 1/3 time-travels back to the 90’s, with the question of “what if LOOΠΔ was created in the 90’s?”. They then raise their innocent and pure voices up as if ‘Rain 51db’ is the original soundtrack to an animation film with a storytelling, singing that they have “dreams that they do not wake up from.”

== Track listing ==
No.	Title	Lyrics	Music	Arrangement	Length
1.	"Into the New Heart" (guitar by Kim Jungmo of TRAX)		Hwang Hyun; NOPARI (MonoTree)	Hwang Hyun; NOPARI (MonoTree)	1:08
2.	"Love&Live" (지금, 좋아해)	Hwang Hyun (MonoTree)	Hwang Hyun (MonoTree)	Hwang Hyun (MonoTree)	3:26
3.	"You and Me Together"	Artronic Waves; David Kater	Artronic Waves; David Kater	Artronic Waves	3:07
4.	"Fairy Tale"	Artronic Waves	Artronic Waves	Artronic Waves	3:07
5.	"Valentine Girl" (3월을 기다려)	Hwang Hyun (MonoTree)	Hwang Hyun (MonoTree)	Hwang Hyun (MonoTree)	3:10
Total length:					13:57

Love&Evil reissue track listing
No.	Title	Lyrics	Music	Arrangement	Length
1.	"Love&Evil"		Sweetch	Sweeth	1:02
2.	"Sonatine" (알 수 없는 비밀)	Sweetch, Noh Ju Hwan	Sweetch, Noh Ju Hwan, Meng-i	Meng-i, Sweetch, Noh Ju Hwan	3:17
3.	"Rain 51db" (비의 목소리 51db)	Oreo	Oreo	Oreo	3:21
4.	"Love&Live" (지금, 좋아해)	Hwang Hyun (MonoTree)	Hwang Hyun (MonoTree)	Hwang Hyun (MonoTree)	3:26
5.	"You and Me Together"	Artronic Waves; David Kater	Artronic Waves; David Kater	Artronic Waves	3:07
6.	"Fairy Tale"	Artronic Waves	Artronic Waves	Artronic Waves	3:07
7.	"Valentine Girl" (3월을 기다려)	Hwang Hyun (MonoTree)	Hwang Hyun (MonoTree)	Hwang Hyun (MonoTree)	3:10
Total length:					20:30

Love&Evil reissue physical editions bonus tracks
No.	Title	Lyrics	Music	Arrangement	Length
8.	"Love&Live Remix (Note: Only available in the normal edition of the album)" (지금, 좋아해)	Hwang Hyun (MonoTree)	Hwang Hyun (MonoTree)	Hwang Hyun (MonoTree)	2:58
9.	"You and Me Together Remix (Note: Only available in the limited edition of the album)"	Artronic Waves; David Kater	Artronic Waves; David Kater	Artronic Waves	3:17
Total length:					26:45

Notesl

== Charts ==
=== Love&Live ===
Chart	Peak position	Sales
South Korea Gaon Weekly Album Chart	10	7,130
South Korea Gaon Monthly Album Chart	36	7,130

=== Love&Evil ===
Chart	Peak position	Sales
South Korea Gaon Weekly Album Chart	24	5,924
South Korea Gaon Monthly Album Chart	65	5,924
