= Yeojin =

South Korean singer (born 2002)

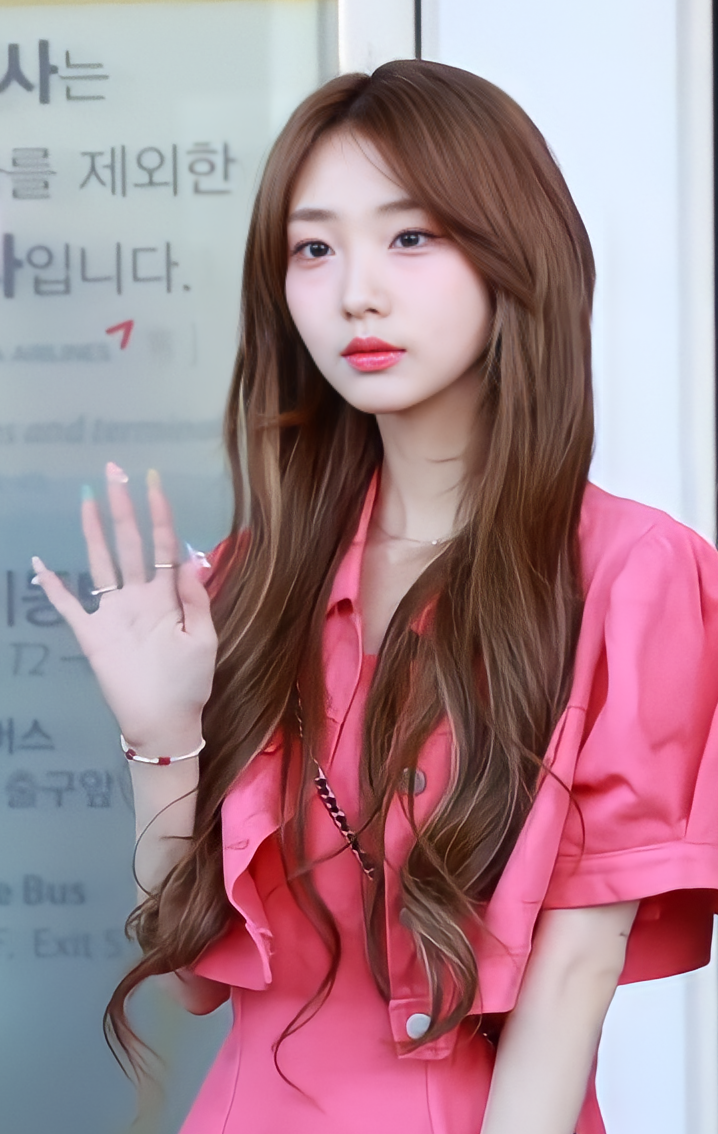
- Yeojin in 2023
- Born: Im Yeo-jin; November 11, 2002 (age 24); Daegu, South Korea
- Education: School of Performing Arts Seoul
- Occupation: Singer
- Years active: 2017–present
- Musical career
- Genre: K-pop
- Instrument: Vocals
- Labels: Blockberry Creative; CTDENM; MUMW
- Member of: Loona; Loossemble

Korean name
- Hangul: 임여진
- RR: Im Yeojin
- MR: Im Yŏjin

Im Yeo-jin (Korean: 임여진; born November 11, 2002) is a South Korean singer. She is a member of Loona and its spinoff Loossemble. She debuted as a soloist on March 3, 2026, with her single album Lv1.

== Early life ==
Im Yeo-jin was born on November 11, 2002, in Daegu, South Korea. Yeojin graduated from School of Performing Arts Seoul in 2021.

== Career ==
=== 2017–2022: Debut with Loona and legal disputes ===
On January 4, 2017, Blockberry Creative revealed Yeojin as the fourth member of the South Korean girl group Loona. Yeojin's self-titled single album was released on January 16, along with music videos for the title track "Kiss Later" and the B-sides "My Sunday" and "My Melody". Yeojin debuted with Loona as a full group on August 20, 2018, through the EP [+ +].

In 2021, Loona members YeoJin, Kim Lip, Go Won and Choerry collaborated with the children's television show Cocomong to release the singles "Yum-Yum" and "Yummy-Yummy".

On November 28, JTBC Entertainment News reported that nine members of Loona, including Yeojin, had filed an application for a provisional injunction to suspend their exclusive contract with Blockberry Creative, following member Chuu's expulsion three days earlier. On June 16, the Seoul High Court ruled in Yeojin's favor, suspending her contract with Blockberry Creative.

=== 2023–2024: CTDENM and debut with Loossemble ===
On July 5, 2023, Yeojin signed an exclusive contract with CTDENM. On August 2, she was revealed as a member of Loossemble along with Loona members Hyunjin, Vivi, Go Won, and Hyeju. The group debuted on September 15 with their self-titled EP. On November 29, 2024, CTDENM announced that the Loossemble members' exclusive contracts with the label had ended.

=== 2025–present: MUMW and solo debut ===
On June 8, 2025, Yeojin released the single "Dancing in the Dark" through the entertainment company MUMW. On January 26, 2026, MUMW announced Yeojin had signed an exclusive contract with the label. On February 13, MUMW shared an unreleased song by Yeojin titled "My Valentine" through their YouTube channel, stating the song would be included in an official album in the future. On March 10, Yeojin released her debut single album Lv1 with the title track "Sugar Talk". Yeojin released her second single album Lv2 with the title track "Red Hot Chili Summer" on June 23.

== Discography ==
=== Single albums ===
List of single albums, showing selected details
Title	Details
Lv1	Released: March 10, 2026; Label: MUMW; Formats: Digital download, streaming; Track listing: 1. "BTW"; 2. "Sugar Talk"; 3. "My Valentine"
Lv2	Released: June 23, 2026; Label: MUMW; Formats: Digital download, streaming; Track listing: 1. "Red Hot Chili Summer"; 2. "Quiet Yes"; 3. "Two Halves"

=== Compilation albums ===
List of compilation albums, showing selected details, chart positions, and sales figures
Title	Details	Peak chart positions	Sales
Title	Details	KOR	Sales
Lv1 & Lv2	Released: August 6, 2026; Label: MUMW, Stone Music Entertainment; Format: LP; Track listing: 1. "BTW"; 2. "Sugar Talk"; 3. "My Valentine"; 4. "Red Hot Chili Summer"; 5. "Quiet Yes"; 6. "Two Halves"	78	KOR: 924

=== Singles ===
List of singles, showing year released and name of the album
Title	Year	Album
"Kiss Later" (Note: credited to Loona, but the track is a solo by Yeojin)	2017	YeoJin
"Dancing in the Dark"	2025	Non-album single
"Sugar Talk"	2026	Lv1
"Red Hot Chili Summer"	2026	Lv2

=== Songwriting credits ===
All credits are adapted from the Korea Music Copyright Association.

Title	Year	Artist	Album
"Colouring"	2023	Loossemble	Loossemble
"Moonlight"	2024	Loossemble	One of a Kind
"Hocus Pocus"	2024	Loossemble	TTYL

== Videography ==
Title	Year	Director	Ref.
"My Valentine"	2026	Billie	
"Sugar Talk"	2026	Billie & Cid	
"Red Hot Chili Summer"	2026	Billie	

== Filmography ==
=== Web series ===
Year	Name	Role	Ref.
2017–2018	Do You Remember When We First Met?	Im Yeojin	
