= One of a Kind (Loossemble EP) =

- Digital cover

EP by Loossemble
- Released: April 15, 2024
- Length: 23:00
- Labels: CTDENM; Warner Music

Loossemble chronology
Loossemble (2023)	One of a Kind (2024)	TTYL (2024)

Singles from One of a Kind
- 1. "Girls' Night" Released: April 15, 2024

One of a Kind is the second extended play by Loossemble. It was released on April 15, 2024 under CTDENM. The EP contains 8 tracks, including the lead single "Girls' Night".

== Background and release ==
On March 15, 2024, CTDENM announced via the group's official social media account that the upcoming second EP would be titled One of a Kind and was to be released on April 16.

The release date was immediately met with backlash from fans, as April 16, 2024 was to coincide with the 10th anniversary of the sinking of MV Sewol. On March 19, the company posted on the group's fanclub site that the release date would be brought forward one day to April 15.

The track list was released on April 12, with the music video teaser and highlight medley following over the course of the next two days. The EP and music video for the lead single "Girls' Night" were released at the same time at 6:00 PM KST on April 15, 2024.

== Commercial performance ==
In the first day of release, the EP sold 44,075 copies — an increase of 13,000 from their debut. It debuted at #5 on the South Korean Circle Chart & cumulatively sold 68,369 copies throughout its run on the chart.

The EP's single Girls' Night peaked at #91 on the Circle Downloads chart.

== Track listing ==
One of a Kind track listing
No.	Title	Lyrics	Music	Length
1.	"Intro (A Butterfly's Signal)"	Owenx	Taeseok; 77child	0:53
2.	"Girls' Night"	Hyeju	Wkly; Justin Reinstein; JJean	3:24
3.	"Moonlight"	YeoJin	Ends; Adora; Jinsol	3:10
4.	"Boomerang"	Jo Yoon-kyung	Bailey Flores; Matthew Thornton	3:12
5.	"He Said I Said"	Guava (NiNE); Min-gu Kim (NiNE); Vivi	Min-gu Kim (NiNE); Yejun Lee (NiNE); Guava (NiNE); Funny Bone (NiNE); Kim Tae-young (NiNE)	3:00
6.	"Truman Show"	Min!n' (NiNE); Yves; Gowon	Mingu Kim (NiNE); Woojeong Choi (NiNE); Min!n' (NiNE); Yves	3:14
7.	"Starlight"	Hyunjin	Alina Smith; Annalise Morelli; Gino Barletta	3:23
8.	"Girls' Night" (Instrumental)		Wkly; Justin Reinstein; JJean	3:25
Total length:				23:00

== Charts ==
=== Weekly charts ===
Weekly chart performance for One of a Kind
Chart (2024)	Peak position
South Korean Albums (Circle)	5

=== Monthly charts ===
Monthly chart performance for One of a Kind
Chart (2024)	Position
South Korean Albums (Circle)	22
