= Hyeju =

South Korean singer (born 2001)

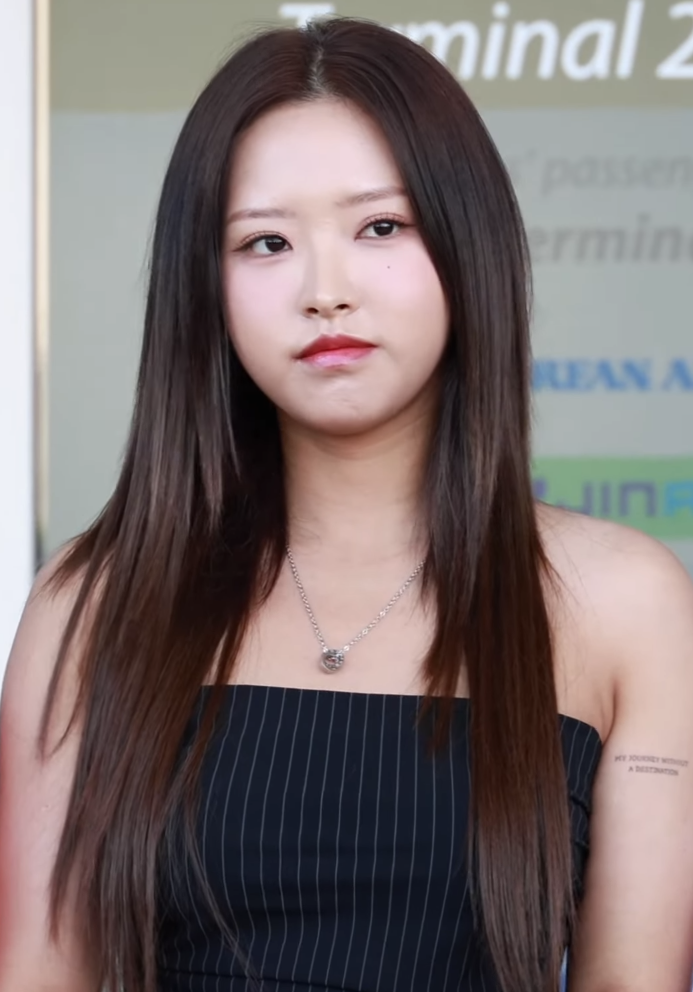
- Hyeju in September 2023
- Born: Son Hye-ju; November 13, 2001 (age 25); Sillim-dong, Seoul, South Korea
- Occupations: Singer; rapper; dancer
- Years active: 2018–2025
- Musical career
- Genre: K-pop
- Instrument: Vocals
- Labels: Blockberry Creative; CTDENM
- Member of: Loona; Loona yyxy; Loossemble

Korean name
- Hangul: 손혜주
- RR: Son Hyeju
- MR: Son Hyeju

Son Hye-ju (Korean: 손혜주; born November 13, 2001), known mononymously as Hyeju and formerly as Olivia Hye (Korean: 올리비아 혜), is a South Korean singer. She debuted as the twelfth and final member of the South Korean girl group Loona and later as a member of its sub-unit Loona yyxy. She was also a member of the K-pop girl group Loossemble.

== Career ==
=== 2018–2022: Debut with Loona and yyxy and legal disputes ===
Hyeju was selected as the twelfth and final member of Loona in early 2018 after a short training period of one day at Blockberry Creative. She was revealed under the stage name Olivia Hye on March 17 and released her debut self-titled single album on March 30 with the main track "Egoist".

On May 30 at that same year, she was introduced as a member of Loona's third sub-unit, Loona yyxy, which released the EP Beauty & the Beat and its title track "love4eva" featuring Grimes. She made her official debut with the full Loona group on August 20, 2018, with the EP [+ +] and the title track "Hi High".

On March 1, 2022, Hyeju released a remake of the song "I'll Be Your Spring (봄이 되어줄게)" by Airman and Godak.

On November 28, nine members of Loona, including Hyeju, had filed an application for a provisional injunction to suspend their exclusive contract with Blockberry Creative, following member Chuu's expulsion three days earlier. On June 16, the Seoul High Court ruled in Hyeju's favor, suspending her contract with Blockberry Creative.

=== 2023–present: CTDENM and debut with Loossemble ===
On July 5, 2023, Hyeju signed an exclusive contract with CTDENM. The agency announced she would promote under her birth name, Hyeju, moving forward. On August 2, she was revealed as a member of Loossemble along with Loona members Hyunjin, Yeojin, Vivi, and Go Won. Loossemble debuted on September 15 with their self-titled EP. On November 29, 2024, CTDENM announced that the Loossemble members' exclusive contracts with the label had ended.

On April 17, 2025, the Seoul Northern District Court officially terminated Hyeju's exclusive contract with Blockberry Creative.

== Personal life ==
On December 4, 2024, Hyeju attended a protest rally at the National Assembly demanding the impeachment of President Yoon Suk Yeol. She expressed her solidarity, stating, "Some people might feel uncomfortable that I'm voicing my opinion about this, but I am a citizen of this country before I am an idol, so I think this is the right thing to do. Let's be strong!"

== Discography ==
=== Singles ===
List of singles as lead artist, showing year released, selected chart positions, and name of the album
Title	Year	Peak chart positions	Album
Title	Year	US World	Album
"Egoist" (Note: credited to Loona, but the track is a solo by Hyeju) (featuring Jinsoul)	2018	9	Olivia Hye
"I'll Be Your Spring"	2022	—	Non-album single
"—" denotes releases that did not chart or were not released in that region.

=== Songwriting credits ===
All credits are adapted from the Korea Music Copyright Association.

Title	Year	Artist	Album
"Real world"	2023	Loossemble	Loossemble
"Girls' Night"	2024	Loossemble	One of a Kind
"Secret Diary"	2024	Loossemble	TTYL

== Filmography ==
Year	Title	Role	Ref.
2021	The Fishermen and the City (Season 3)	Herself (Episodes 10–11)	
2022	Girl's Re:Verse	Contestant (as Chonky Cat)	
