= K (EP) =

2023 extended play by Heejin

- Digital cover

EP by Heejin
- Released: October 31, 2023
- Genre: K-pop
- Length: 16:47
- Language: Korean
- Label: Modhaus

Heejin chronology
HeeJin (2016)	K (2023)

Singles from K
- 1. "Algorithm" Released: October 31, 2023

K (Note: Stylized as <K>) is the debut extended play (EP) by South Korean singer Heejin of the girl group Artms. It was released through Modhaus on October 31, 2023. The EP features six tracks, including the lead single "Algorithm". It is primarily a pop record with themes about heartbreak in the digital era. Heejin was closely involved with all aspects of the album's production, and wrote lyrics for four of the songs.

== Background ==
Heejin first debuted as a member of Loona in 2016, and released the single album HeeJin with the group later that year. Following a series of legal disputes, several of the group's members, including Heejin, signed a new contract under the agency Modhaus in March 2023, and redebuted as Artms in 2024.

In August 2023, it was reported that Heejin would be making her solo debut with a new album planned for release in October. Despite her previous single album, Heejin considers K to be her true solo debut release, citing the small scale of the older work and her lack of creative control over it.

K was promoted before release with two music video teasers, released on October 12 and October 24, as well as a series of concept photos released on October 20. The teasers and photos all featured Heejin wearing a traditional Korean hanbok.

== Title and composition ==
The title of K stands for Korea. Heejin explained that she chose the title as she was inspired by the popularity of Korean popular culture such as Korean dramas and K-pop, and wanted the album to represent "the beauty of her country".

Heejin was extensively involved in the album's production. She co-wrote lyrics for four of the songs, participated in the album design, and personally selected elements such as the concept images that would be used and the outfits that she wore. Heejin described the concept for the album as reflecting "Heejin herself" and that it would aim to show a more authentic side of her. She also said that while she had felt unable to voice her opinions during the production of the single album HeeJin, she now felt confident enough to give input and disagree with the agency's ideas if necessary, which was reflected in her close involvement in the production.

K has been described as an album about "precious human experiences such as falling in love and heartbreak". The EP opens with the track "Kehwa", which means "to bloom" in Korean. Heejin stated that she wanted this to reflect her desire to present herself to an even wider audience. Heejin wrote the lyrics for the title track, "Algorithm", after the name of the song had already been decided. She explained that the song is about wanting to forget someone but having things related to them continue to appear on one's social media algorithm. The song's production is based on 1980s Western pop music from artists such as Madonna, Janet Jackson, and Cyndi Lauper. For the third track, "Video Game", Heejin drew inspiration from the film Wreck-It Ralph (2012), and quickly wrote the lyrics in just one day. It is a "groovy" song with a strong bass line; Heejin stated that it was her favorite of the B-side tracks. The fifth track, "Nokia", is a breakup song that is named after cell phone manufacturer Nokia, with lyrics reflecting on a broken relationship "like a phone that is now discontinued and no longer exists". The sixth track, "Addiction", was almost chosen as a song for the girl group TripleS; Heejin wrote the lyrics after reflecting on her habit of eating snacks late at night.

== Release ==
K was released on October 31, 2023. To promote the EP and communicate with her fans, Heejin held a showcase at Seongam Art Hall in the Gangnam district of Seoul on the EP's release day, where she introduced the album and performed songs including "Video Game", "Sad Girls Club", and "Algorithm".

A music video for "Algorithm", directed by Kim Sunung of Kings Creative Lab, was released alongside the EP. In the video, Heejin stars as a Korean princess living in a traditional Korean palace who wants to escape the palace to pursue her dream of becoming a K-pop star. The style of the video was modeled after the television series Princess Hours (2006), of which Heejin is a fan.

== Track listing ==
K track listing
No.	Title	Lyrics	Music	Arrangement	Length
1.	"Kehwa" (개화; Gaehwa; lit. '"Flowering"')	Artronic Waves	Artronic Waves	Artronic Waves	1:16
2.	"Algorithm"	Heejin, Artronic Waves, Jaden Jeong	Artronic Waves, Yi Sae Bom	Artronic Waves	3:08
3.	"Sad Girls Club"	imsuho, Oona Muurinen	imsuho, Naasim, Dr.Han, Oona Muurinen	imsuho, Naasim, Dr.Han	3:17
4.	"Video Game"	Heejin, Johan Gustafsson, Teodor Dahlbom, Julia Hallasen, Hanna Lilliecreutz	Johan Gustafsson, Teodor Dahlbom, Julia Hallasen, Hanna Lilliecreutz	Johan Gustafsson, Teodor Dahlbom	3:06
5.	"Nokia"	Heejin, Park So-hyun, Jaden Jeong	KZ, Kim Taeyoung, DINT, Charlotte Wilson, Rachael Chevlin	KZ, Kim Tae-young	3:14
6.	"Addiction"	Heejin, Jaden Jeong, G-high (MonoTree), San Yoon, Isa Guerra, Casper Redson, Hawa Song	BADD, San Yoon, Isa Guerra, Casper Redson, Hawa Song	BADD	2:38
Total length:					16:47

== Credits and personnel ==
Credits adapted from Melon and from the album's liner notes.

Studios

- Doobdoob Studio - recording (track 3)
- The Vibe Studio - recording (tracks 2, 4-6)
- Gateway Studio - mixing (tracks 1, 4-6)
- DINT Studio - editing (track 5)
- 821 Sound – mastering

Musicians

- Heejin – lead vocals, backing vocals (tracks 2, 6), co-producer, lyricist (tracks 2, 4-6)
- Janet Suhh – backing vocals (tracks 4, 6)
- Kim So-hyun – backing vocals (track 3)
- Cheon Ji-won – backing vocals (track 5)
- Artronic Waves – arrangement, synthesizer (track 2)
- Yi Sae-bom – composition (track 2)
- Da-woo-ri – electric piano, vocal direction, digital editing (track 2)
- Lee Tae-wook – guitar (track 2)
- Dr. Han – arrangement, composition, drums, guitar, digital editing (track 3)
- Naasim – arrangement, composition, piano, bass (track 3)
- Imsuho – arrangement, composition, lyrics, synthesizer, vocal direction (track 3)
- Oona Muurinen – composition (track 3)
- Johan Gustafsson – composition, production (track 4)
- Teodor Dahlbom – composition, production (track 4)
- Hanna Lilliecreutz – composition, lyrics (track 4)
- Julia Hallasen – composition, lyrics (track 4)
- KZ – arrangement, composition, electric piano, MIDI programming, piano, drums, bass (track 5)
- Kim Tae-young – arrangement, composition (track 5)
- Charlotte Wilson – composition (track 5)
- DINT – composition, vocal direction, digital editing (track 5)
- Rachael Chevlin – composition (track 5)
- Tae-bong-i – guitar, MIDI programming, piano, drums, bass (track 5)
- BADD – arrangement, composition, keyboards, synthesizer, vocal direction, digital editing (track 6)
- Casper Redson – composition, lyrics (track 6)
- Isa Guerra – composition, lyrics (track 6)
- San Yoon – composition, lyrics (track 6)
- Hwa Song – composition, lyrics (track 6)

Production

- Jaden Jeong - producer, creative director
- Heejin – co-producer
- Joseph Baek – executive producer
- Kim Jong-soo – content producer
- Kim Jin-soo – content producer
- Min Sung-hwan – recording (tracks 2, 4-6)
- Kwon Yu-jin – recording (track 3)
- Lee Tae-seop – mixing (tracks 1, 4-6)
- Jung Jin – mixing (tracks 2, 3)
- Kwon Nam-woo – mastering
- Kang Seon-young – digital editing (tracks 4, 6)
- BADD – digital editing (tracks 4, 6)

== Charts ==
=== Weekly charts ===
Weekly chart performance for K
Chart (2023)	Peak position
South Korean Albums (Circle)	14

=== Monthly charts ===
Monthly chart performance for K
Chart (2023)	Peak position
South Korean Albums (Circle)	50

== Sales ==
Certified sales for K
Region	Certification	Certified units/sales
South Korea	—	25,666

== Release history ==
Release dates and formats for K
Region	Date	Format(s)	Label	Ref.
Various	October 31, 2023	CD; digital download; streaming	Modhaus; Kakao Entertainment	
