= Butterfly (Loona song) =

2019 single by Loona

Single by Loona

from the album [X X]
- Language: Korean
- Released: February 19, 2019
- Genre: Dream pop; synth-pop; EDM
- Length: 3:57
- Label: Blockberry Creative
- Songwriters: G-High (MonoTree); Jaden Jeong
- Producer: G-High (MonoTree)

Loona singles chronology
"Hi High" (2018)	"Butterfly" (2019)	"365" (2019)

Music video
- "Butterfly" on YouTube

"Butterfly" is a song released by South Korean girl group Loona. It was released on February 19, 2019, as the title track from [X X], the repackage of the EP [+ +], which was released in 2018.

== Composition ==
"Butterfly" is a dream pop, synth-pop and EDM song written by G-High from MonoTree and Jaden Jeong, with G-High also serving as the producer. Billboard described "Butterfly" as having a "bass-infused, synthy melody" with a "sense of bright airiness and groovy beat drops." It also highlighted the focus on the diverse vocals tones that moved between "autotuned wails, breathy verses and coy raps". Lyrically, the members sing about flying like a butterfly and letting dreams take flight.

== Commercial performance ==
"Butterfly" debuted at number 6 on the US World Digital Songs Sales chart with 1,000 downloads sold. This is their second Top 10 on the chart and third entry as full group, after "Favorite" peaked at number 4 and "Hi High" peaked at number 11.

== Music video ==
"Butterfly" – Full music video

The music video for the song was shot in France, Hong Kong, China, the United States, Iceland and South Korea. Loona's visual director Digipedi revealed that they toured 5 countries across 3 continents for the "Butterfly effects" that captures the freedom and courage of girls worldwide. The video featured scenes of women of different ethnicities, religions, and nationalities from all around the world, interspersed with clips of the girl group dancing in a serene, lilac-hued amphitheater.

== Accolades ==
"Butterfly" on listicles
Critic/Publication	List	Rank	Ref.
Melon	Top 100 K-pop Songs of All-Time	69	
IZM	Top 10 2019 Singles of the Year	—N/a	

== Charts ==
Chart performance for "Butterfly"
Chart (2019)	Peak position
US World Digital Song Sales (Billboard)	6

Chart performance for "Butterfly" (Queendom version)
Chart (2022)	Peak position
South Korea Download (Gaon)	107

== Release history ==
Region	Date	Format	Label
Various	February 19, 2019	Digital download; streaming	Blockberry Creative
