= ViVi (single album) =

Single album by Loona
- Released: April 17, 2017
- Genre: Pop
- Length: 6:38
- Language: Korean
- Labels: Blockberry Creative; CJ E&M

Loona chronology
Love & Live (2017)	ViVi (2017)	Kim Lip (2017)

Loona pre-debut single album chronology
YeoJin (2017)	ViVi (2017)	Kim Lip (2017)

Alternative cover
- HaSeul & ViVi artwork

Music video
- "Everyday I Love You (Feat. HaSeul)” on YouTube

ViVi (also known as HaSeul & ViVi) is the fifth single album from South Korean girl group Loona's pre-debut project. It was released on April 17, 2017, by Blockberry Creative and distributed by CJ E&M. It is the first solo single by member ViVi who was previously introduced as a member of Loona 1/3, and contains two tracks, "Everyday I Love You", featuring previously revealed member HaSeul, and "Everyday I Need You", featuring then-upcoming member JinSoul.

"Everyday I Love You" is an upbeat 80's style disco-pop track in D Major at 120 bpm. "Everyday I Need You" features the same lyrics in an 80's style ballad, in D Major, slowed to 97 bpm.

== Track listing ==
All lyrics are written by Yoon Young-min, Child's Play and Kim Nam-young.

No.	Title	Music	Arrangement	Length
1.	"Everyday I Love You" (feat. Haseul)	Child's Play; Yoon Young-min; Kim Nam-young; Melody Workshop	Child's Play; Yoon; Melody Workshop	3:28
2.	"Everyday I Need You" (feat. Jinsoul)	Yoon; Child's Play; Kim	Yoon; Child's Play; Kim	3:10
Total length:				6:38

== Charts ==
Chart	Peak position	Sales
South Korea Gaon Weekly Album Chart	14	8,716
South Korea Gaon Monthly Album Chart	53	8,716
