= Olivia Hye (single album) =

Single album by Loona
- Released: March 30, 2018
- Genre: Pop
- Length: 7:22
- Language: Korean
- Labels: Blockberry Creative; Vlending Co., Ltd.; Windmill ENT

Loona chronology
Go Won (2018)	Olivia Hye (2018)	Beauty & the Beat (2018)

Alternative cover
- GoWon & Olivia Hye artwork

Music video
- "Egoist" on YouTube

Olivia Hye (also known as Go Won & Olivia Hye) is the twelfth single album from South Korean girl group Loona's pre-debut project. It was released digitally on the March 30, 2018, through Blockberry Creative and Vlending Co. LTD and was released physically on April 2, 2018, through Windmill Entertainment. The single formally introduces the twelfth and final member of Loona, Hyeju (formerly Olivia Hye) and thus marks the end of the pre-debut solo single concept. The single contains two tracks, HyeJu's solo "Egoist" featuring JinSoul and a duet with Go Won titled "Rosy" which also features Heejin.

== Track listing ==
No.	Title	Lyrics	Music	Arrangement	Length
1.	"Egoist" (feat. JinSoul)	Park Ji-yeon (MonoTree), Jaden Jeong	Artonic Waves, LAB301, Pablo Groove	Artonic Waves, LAB301, Pablo Groove	4:07
2.	"Rosy" (Go Won and Olivia Hye feat. HeeJin)	Darly	Billie Jean, Kim Jin-hyung, Hickee (BADD)	Billie Jean, Kim Jin-hyung (BADD)	3:15
Total length:					7:22

== Charts ==
Chart (2018)	Peak position
South Korean Albums (Gaon)	11
