= Haseul =

South Korean singer (born 1997)

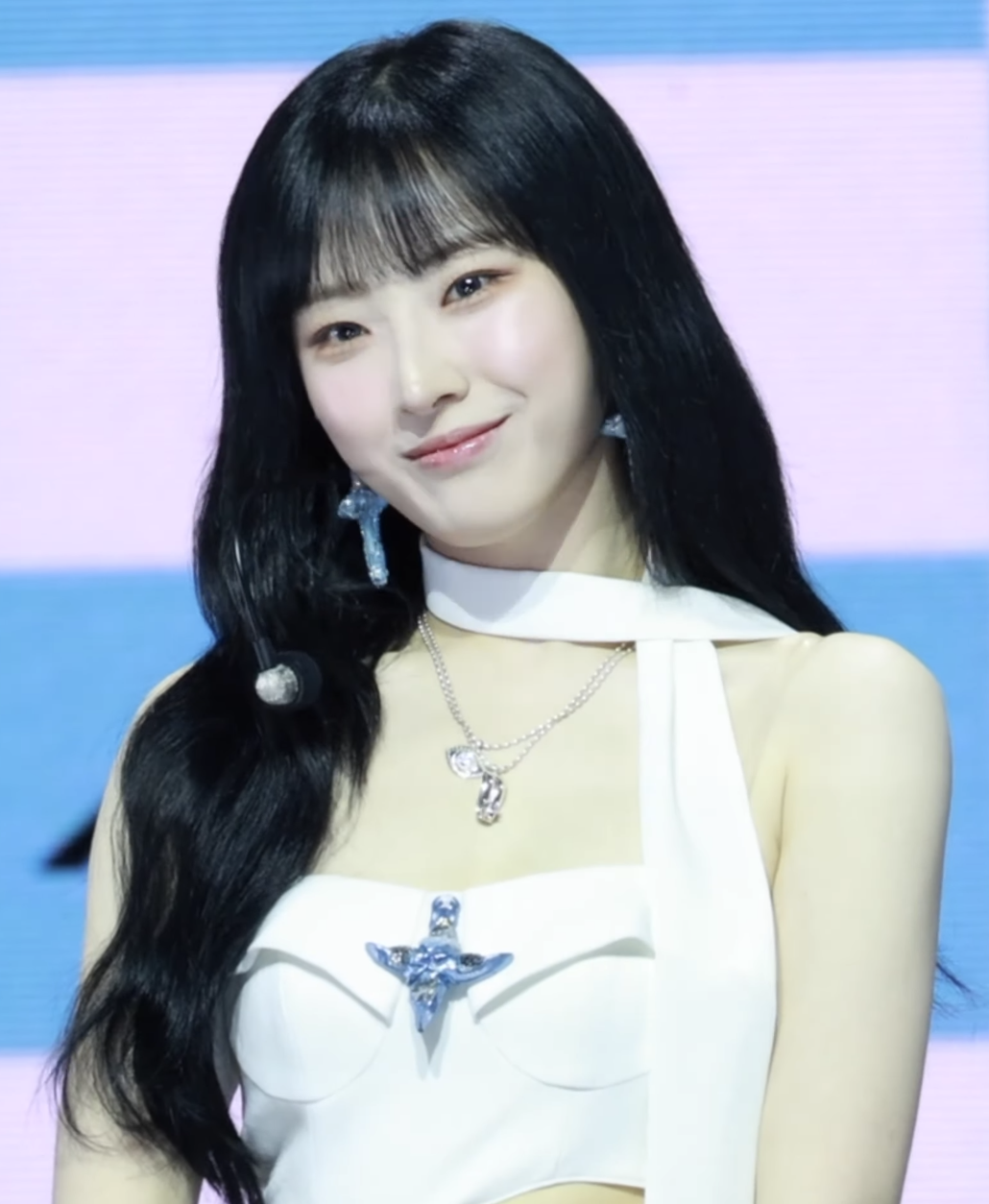
- Haseul in May 2024
- Born: Cho Ha-seul; August 18, 1997 (age 29); South Korea
- Occupation: Singer
- Musical career
- Genre: K-pop
- Instrument: Vocals
- Years active: 2016–present
- Labels: Blockberry Creative; Modhaus
- Member of: Loona; Loona 1/3; Artms

Korean name
- Hangul: 조하슬
- RR: Jo Haseul
- MR: Cho Hasŭl

Cho Ha-seul (Korean: 조하슬; born August 18, 1997), known mononymously as Haseul (occasionally stylized as HaSeul) is a South Korean singer. She is the leader of Loona, its sub-unit Loona 1/3, and a member of Artms.

== Early life ==
Cho Ha-seul was born August 18, 1997, in Suncheon, Jeolla, South Korea and raised in Beolgyo. She sang in a children's choir while she was in elementary school. Haseul went to high school in the United States for one year. Instead of pursuing her original plans to study opera in college, Haseul became a Blockberry Creative trainee after she was cast at a song festival her music teacher convinced her to participate in.

== Career ==
=== 2016–2022: Debut with Loona and sub-unit Loona 1/3 ===
Blockberry Creative began releasing teasers for the third member of Loona in early December 2016. Haseul was revealed as the third member on December 8. On December 15, Haseul officially debuted as a member of Loona through her eponymous single album with tracks "Let Me In" and "The Carol" featuring fellow members Heejin and Hyunjin.

In January 2017, Haseul collaborated with fellow member Yeojin for the song "My Melody" on Yeojin's debut single album. On March 13, Haseul debuted alongside members Heejin, Hyunjin, and ViVi in Loona's first sub-unit Loona 1/3 with the mini album Love & Live. Haseul officially debuted with Loona as a full group on August 20, 2018 with the release of their debut EP [+ +].

On November 28, 2022, JTBC Entertainment News reported that nine members of Loona, including Haseul, had filed an application for a provisional injunction to suspend their exclusive contract with Blockberry Creative, following member Chuu's expulsion three days earlier.

=== 2023–present: Solo activities and re-debut with Artms ===
In June 2023, after her contract with Blockberry Creative was suspended, Haseul signed with the label Modhaus to join fellow Loona members Heejin, Kim Lip, Jinsoul, and Choerry in a new project, where they would eventually debut as Artms. On September 6, Modhaus announced Haseul's first small theater concert series, "Music Studio 81.8Hz", to be held from October 26 to 29 and teased the reveal of an unreleased song. On October 26, she released the teased solo song "Plastic Candy" as a digital single.

On December 9, 2024, Haseul released her second digital single "Fragile Eyes".

In April 2025, Haseul's contract with Blockberry Creative was officially ruled invalid by a judge. In September, Modhaus announced Haseul's second small theater concert series, "Our Fairytale", to be held on October 25 and 26. On September 18, she released her third digital single "Love Poison".

In 2026, Haseul paused promoting with Artms to undergo surgery on her shoulder. In June, she released the single "Again" in collaboration with composer Kim Hyung-suk. On September 8, she released the single "Afterglow". A third concert series "Inner-Ego" was announced for November 7 and 8 with four concerts total. The final concert was noted for having a pay what you want pricing plan.

== Personal life ==
Haseul took a hiatus from entertainment industry activities from January 2020 to May 2021 due to anxiety. In 2026, Haseul underwent shoulder surgery and paused entertainment activities to recover.

Haseul and her family are avid Kia Tigers fans, and Haseul has thrown the first pitch and sung the national anthem at multiple games.

== Discography ==
=== Singles ===
List of singles as lead artist, showing year released and name of the album
Title	Year	Peak chart positions	Album
Title	Year	US World	Album
"Let Me In" (Note: credited to Loona, but the track is a solo by Haseul)	2016	14	HaSeul
"Plastic Candy"	2023	—	Non-album singles
"Fragile Eyes"	2024	—	Non-album singles
"Love Poison"	2025	—	Non-album singles
"Again"	2026	—	Non-album singles
"Afterglow"	2026	—	Non-album singles

=== Songwriting credits ===
All songwriting credits are adapted from the Korea Music Copyright Association's database.

Title	Year	Artist	Album
"Playback"	2022	Loona	Flip That

== Videography ==
Title	Year	Ref.
"Plastic Candy" Music Studio 81.8Hz Ver.	2023	
"Fragile Eyes" Lyrics Video	2024	
"Love Poison" Mood Video	2025	
"Afterglow" Official Track Video	2026	

== Filmography ==
=== Web series ===
Year	Title	Role	Ref.
2017–2018	Do You Remember When We First Met?	Cho Haseul	
