= Favorite (Loona song) =

2018 song by Loona

Single by Loona

from the EP [+ +]
- Language: Korean
- Released: August 7, 2018
- Genre: Dance-pop; alternative R&B
- Length: 3:14
- Label: BlockBerry Creative
- Songwriters: Kim Su-jung; Jaden Jeong
- Producers: Billie Jean (BADD); SlyBerry; Kim Jin-hyeong (BADD)

Loona singles chronology
| "Favorite" (2018) | "Hi High" (2018) |

Music video
- "favOriTe" on YouTube

"Favorite" (stylized as "favOriTe") is the debut single released by South Korean girl group Loona. It was released on August 7, 2018, by Blockberry Creative as a digital single. This was their first release as a full twelve-member group.

== Composition ==
The lyrics were written by Kim Su-jung and Jaden Jeong. It was produced by Sophia Pae and BADD's SlyBerry, Billie Jean, and Kim Jin-hyeong. It was described by Billboard as a brassy dance track that overflows with charisma and bright percussion. Adding that with prominent trills and trumpeting synths propelling the melody to its dynamic chorus, plus a woozy, alt R&B bridge later in the song, the song condenses the act's innovative nature into a boisterous tune.

== Background and release ==
A music video teaser was released on August 1, 2018.

"Favorite" was released as a digital single on August 7, 2018, through several music portals, including Melon and iTunes.

== Commercial performance ==
"favOriTe" peaked at number 4 on the US World Digital Song Sales chart, their first and highest entry as a group until the release of single "365".

== Music video ==
The music video was released alongside the single on August 7. The video focuses on the group's choreography, featuring the twelve members wearing simple uniform-inspired blouse and skirt looks.

As of December 25, 2022, the favOriTe's music video has reached 14 million views on YouTube.

== Charts ==
| Chart | Peak position |
|---|---|
| US World (Billboard) | 4 |

== Release history ==
| Region | Date | Format | Label |
|---|---|---|---|
| Various | August 7, 2018 | Digital download; streaming | Blockberry Creative |
