= Hi High =

2018 single by Loona

Single by Loona

from the EP [+ +]
- Language: Korean
- Released: August 20, 2018
- Genre: Electropop; bubblegum pop
- Length: 3:16
- Label: Blockberry Creative
- Songwriters: Jaden Jeong; GDLO; Hwang Hyun (MonoTree)
- Producers: Jaden Jeong; GDLO; Hwang Hyun (MonoTree); Mayu Wakisaka

Loona singles chronology
| "Favorite" (2018) | "Hi High" (2018) | "Butterfly" (2019) |

Music video
- "Hi High" on YouTube

"Hi High" is a song by the South Korean girl group Loona. It was released on August 20, 2018, as the title track of Loona's EP [+ +], by Blockberry Creative. It is the group's second single as a full twelve-member group.

== Background and release ==
A teaser for the music video of the song was released on August 17, 2018, and showed the members of Loona running towards something. Various teaser images were also revealed in the lead up to the album's release. On August 20, "Hi High" was released alongside the album [+ +] as its title track.

== Composition and lyrics ==
The lyrics were written by Jaden Jeong, MonoTree's GDLO and MonoTree's Hwang Hyun. The music was composed by Mayu Wakisaka, GDLO, and Hyun. According to Loona, "Hi High" has the double meaning of saying hi to the now-complete lineup of the group's 12 members in addition to representing Loona's goal of climbing to the top of the music scene. It can also been seen as a reference to the group's "Loonaverse" narrative, as all 12 girls come together. Billboard described "Hi High" as a "bright electro-pop song full of quirky beats and synths" with an "upbeat chorus". Furthermore, Billboard stated that the "track picks up and drops momentum frequently", allowing it to highlight the different singing styles of each member of Loona.

== Critical reception ==
The Kpop Herald commented on how the song "delivers the bubbly energy of the band", and TenAsia similarly characterized the song as energetic. Hong Dam-young's album review in The Korea Herald remarked that "Hi High" is fast-paced with a "vivacious tempo and explosive vocals". However, Hong criticized the writing of the song's lyrics as a "major drawback" due to some of its "silly lines".

In 2022 NME crowned the song as the best in Loona's discography calling it a "flawless, impeccable debut single". They added how "perfecting the art of that effervescent, high-octane pop sound, the girls race through the entire song at breakneck speed, leaving not even the slightest room for dullness" in the song. They called the song bubbly, cute, and sprinkled throughout with "lowkey hilarious (but genius) lyrics". They ended their review by commenting how "Hi High" is simply the kind of song that leaves you giddy with happiness every single time.

== Commercial performance ==
"Hi High" peaked at number 11 on the World Digital Songs Sales chart, marking their second consecutive entry as a full group.

== Music video ==
The song's release on August 20, 2018, was accompanied by a music video that was directed by the production company Digipedi, which also worked on many of Loona's previous music videos, including "Favorite". The video is colorful and depicts the members of Loona each dressed in a schoolgirl style, dancing and running. At the end of the video, the Loona member HeeJin jumps upward toward the sky, portraying a sense of positivity and enthusiasm. The video also features the members wearing denim as they perform a routine in an industrial yard, while other scenes see the girls running through meadows, on swings, and jumping off roofs.

The music video reached three million views in three days after its debut, and it later surpassed ten million views eight days after its debut.

== Charts ==
| Chart | Peak position |
|---|---|
| World Digital Song Sales (Billboard) | 11 |

== Release history ==
| Region | Date | Format | Label |
|---|---|---|---|
| Various | August 20, 2018 | Digital download; streaming | Blockberry Creative |
