= Loossemble =

South Korean girl group

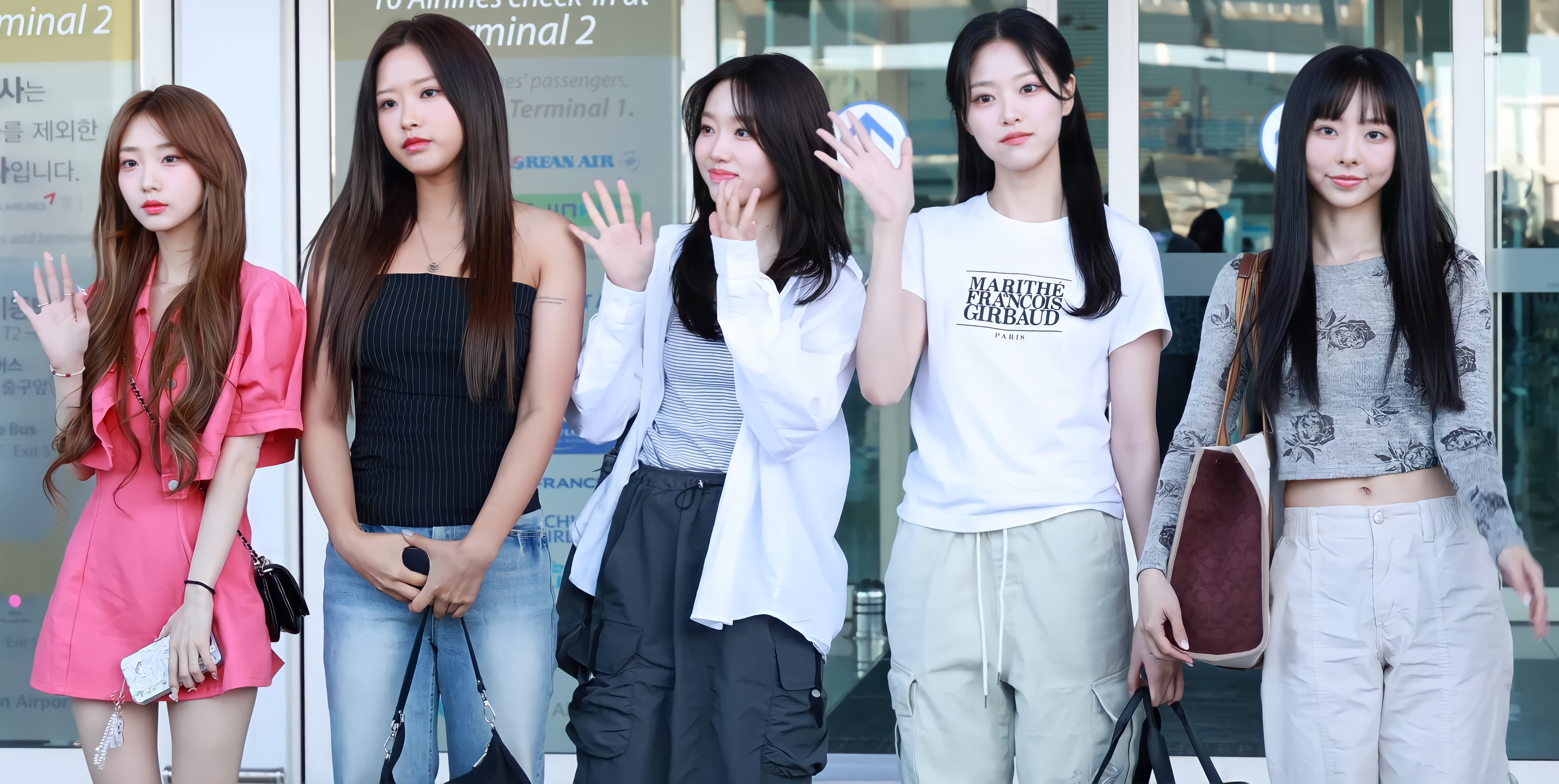
- Loossemble in 2023; L–R: Yeojin, Hyeju, Go Won, Hyunjin, and Vivi

Background information
- Origin: Seoul, South Korea
- Genre: K-pop
- Years active: 2023–2024
- Label: CTDENM
- Spinoff of: Loona
- Members: Hyunjin; Yeojin; Vivi; Go Won; Hyeju

Loossemble (Korean: 루셈블) was a South Korean girl group formed by CTDENM. The group consists of five members: Hyunjin, Yeojin, Vivi, Go Won, and Hyeju. They debuted on September 15, 2023, with the single "Sensitive" from their eponymous extended play.

== Name ==
The group's name, Loossemble, is a portmanteau of "Loona" and "assemble", defined by the agency as "five [Loona] members coming together as one".

== Career ==
=== 2023–2024: Introduction, and debut with Loossemble ===
On June 11, 2023, it was announced that Loona members Hyunjin and Vivi had signed with CTDENM after terminating their contracts with Blockberry Creative. Yeojin, Go Won, and Hyeju followed suit, with CTDENM confirming that they had signed with the agency on July 5.

On July 31, CTDENM announced that the quintet would re-debut as Loossemble with plans of releasing an album. Three days later, it was announced that the quintet would embark on the Loona Assemble the US Debut Ceremony starting from September 15. The tour would conclude with a "finale" once the group returns to South Korea. On August 23, it was announced that Loossemble would debut on September 15 with their self-titled extended play.

On March 18, 2024, CTDENM announced that Loossemble would be releasing their second extended play One of a Kind on April 16. The release date was later moved forward to April 15. On July 18, it was announced that the quintet would be embarking on their next US tour Up_Link Station across nine cities, beginning on October 6. On August 12, CTDENM confirmed that the quintet would be releasing their third extended play TTYL on September 2. On November 29, CTDENM announced that Loossemble's exclusive contract with the label has ended.

== Members ==
- Hyunjin (현진) – leader
- Yeojin (여진)
- Vivi (비비)
- Go Won (고원)
- Hyeju (혜주)

== Discography ==
=== Extended plays ===
List of extended plays, showing selected details, selected chart positions, and sales figures
Title	Details	Peak chart positions	Sales
Title	Details	KOR	Sales
Loossemble	Released: September 15, 2023; Label: CTDENM, Warner Music; Formats: CD, digital download, streaming	6	KOR: 61,102
One of a Kind	Released: April 15, 2024; Label: CTDENM, Warner Music; Formats: CD, digital download, streaming	5	KOR: 68,369
TTYL	Released: September 2, 2024; Label: CTDENM, Warner Music; Formats: CD, digital download, streaming; Track listing: 1. "Fanaticism"; 2. "TTYL"; 3. "Cotton Candy (Confessions)"; 4. "Confessions (Cotton Candy)"; 5. "Hocus Pocus"; 6. "Secret Diary"	15	KOR: 35,682

=== Singles ===
List of singles, showing year released, selected chart positions, and name of the album
Title	Year	Peak chart positions		Album
Title	Year	KOR DL	US World	Album
"Sensitive"	2023	121	10	Loossemble
"Girls Night"	2024	91	—	One of a Kind
"TTYL"	2024	129	—	TTYL
"—" denotes a recording that did not chart or was not released in that territory

== Videography ==
=== Music videos ===
List of music videos, showing year released, and name of the director(s)
Title	Year	Director(s)	Ref.
"Sensitive"	2023	Jung Gu-sang (Studio Goyu)	
"Girls' Night"	2024	Jung Gu-sang (Studio Goyu)	
"TTYL"	2024	Unknown	
"Cotton Candy"	2024	Unknown	
"Confessions"	2024	Unknown	

== Concert and tours ==
=== Headlining tours ===
Loona Assemble the US Debut Ceremony
Date	City	Country	Venue
September 15, 2023	New York City	United States	The Theater at MSG
September 20, 2023	Washington, D.C.	United States	The Theater at MGM National Harbor
September 22, 2023	Atlanta	United States	Gas South Arena
September 24, 2023	Chicago	United States	Chicago Theatre
September 26, 2023	Houston	United States	Smart Financial Centre
September 29, 2023	Fort Worth	United States	Will Rogers Auditorium
October 5, 2023	Oakland	United States	Paramount Theatre
October 7, 2023	Los Angeles	United States	Kia Forum

Up_Link Station US Tour
Date	City	Country
October 6, 2024	Orlando	United States
October 9, 2024	New York	United States
October 11, 2024	Boston	United States
October 14, 2024	Pittsburgh	United States
October 16, 2024	Madison	United States
October 18, 2024	Minneapolis	United States
October 21, 2024	Tacoma	United States
October 23, 2024	San Francisco	United States
October 25, 2024	Los Angeles	United States

== Awards and nominations ==
Name of the award ceremony, year presented, category, nominee of the award, and the result of the nomination
Award ceremony	Year	Category	Nominee / Work	Result	Ref.
Asia Model Festival	2023	New Artist Award – Singer	Loossemble	Won	

=== Listicles ===
Name of publisher, year listed, name of listicle, and placement
Publisher	Year	Listicle	Recipient	Placement	Ref.
Billboard	2024	The 25 Best K-Pop Songs of 2024: Staff Picks	"TTYL"	22nd	
