= HyunJin (single album) =

Single album by Loona
- Released: November 17, 2016
- Genres: K-pop; pop
- Length: 6:38
- Language: Korean
- Labels: Blockberry Creative; CJ E&M

Loona chronology
HeeJin (2016)	HyunJin (2016)	HaSeul (2016)

Alternative cover
- HeeJin & HyunJin artwork

Music video
- "다녀가요 (Around You)” on YouTube

HyunJin (or HeeJin & HyunJin) is the second single album from South Korean girl group Loona's pre-debut project, as well as the debut album of the member Hyunjin. It was released on November 18, 2016, by Blockberry Creative and distributed by CJ E&M. It contains two tracks: Hyunjin's solo song "Around You" and a duet between her and Heejin titled "I'll Be There".

== Background and release ==
At midnight (Note: Korean Standard Time (UTC+09:00)) on October 28, 2016, Blockberry Creative revealed Hyunjin as the second member of Loona along with a promotional image of her. The following day, a second promotional photo was published, showing Hyunjin with previously revealed member Heejin in a garden wearing light pink dresses. The original film version of the music video for "Around You" was uploaded to YouTube at midnight on November 11. HyunJin was officially released at noon on November 17, along with music videos for both of the single album's tracks.

An additional music video for "Around You" was posted on December 9, 2017, as a promotion for the South Korean Web drama Do You Remember When We First Met?.

== Composition ==
The single album's opening track, "I'll Be There", is an upbeat funk-inspired pop song performed as a duet between Heejin and Hyunjin. "Around You" is a downtempo piano ballad performed as a solo track by Hyunjin whose lyrics describe the unrequited romantic feelings of a teenage girl.

=== Music videos ===
The original film version of the music video of "Around You" was filmed in Tokyo and is inspired by Japanese romance movies. It is approximately ten minutes in length. The music video for "I'll Be There" was filmed in Harajuku, Tokyo.

== Track listing ==
Credits adapted from Melon.

No.	Title	Lyrics	Music	Arrangement	Length
1.	"I'll Be There" (Heejin, Hyunjin)	Artronic Waves, David Kater	Artronic Waves, David Kater	Artronic Waves	3:08
2.	"Around You (다녀가요)" (Hyunjin)	Lee Ju-hyung (MonoTree)	Lee Ju-hyung (MonoTree)	Lee Ju-hyung (MonoTree)	3:29
Total length:					6:37

== Charts ==
Chart	Peak position	Sales
South Korea Gaon Weekly Album Chart	12	6,499
South Korea Gaon Monthly Album Chart	65	6,499
