= HeeJin (single album) =

Single album by Loona
- Released: October 5, 2016
- Genres: K-pop; pop; jazztronica; acoustic
- Length: 6:57
- Language: Korean
- Labels: Blockberry Creative; CJ E&M

Loona chronology
HeeJin (2016)	HyunJin (2016)

Heejin solo chronology
HeeJin (2016)	K (2023)

Music video
- "ViViD" on YouTube

HeeJin is the debut single album by South Korean singer Heejin of the girl group Loona, and the first part of the group's pre-debut project. It was released on October 5, 2016, by Blockberry Creative and distributed by CJ E&M. The album contains two tracks, the single "ViViD" and its acoustic mix. Music videos for both songs were released twelve hours apart on October 5.

The single album's opening track "ViViD" is a jazztronica song whose lyrics describe meeting someone new and exciting, and its second track "ViViD (Acoustic Mix)" contains the same lyrics and melody but with an instrumental played on acoustic guitar. The music video of "ViViD" contains colourful set-pieces inspired by Alice in Wonderland. The single album was well-received by critics, who praised the unique sound of "ViViD" and its surreal music video.

== Background and release ==
Throughout September 2016, promotional images of Heejin began to appear at major bus stops in Seoul. Blockberry Creative posted a teaser for the music video of "ViViD" at midnight (Note: UTC+9) on September 29. At noon on October 4, a second teaser was released, showing clips from the music video of the acoustic mix of "ViViD". The music video for "ViViD" was posted on October 5 at midnight, with the music video for its acoustic mix being posted at noon on the same day.

== Composition ==
"ViViD", the single album's lead single, is a jazztronica song written and composed by MonoTree. It has been described by Han Eun-suk of ET News and Kim Seong-min of Seoul Economic Daily as a colourful lo-fi track that showcases Heejin's unique character. Its lyrics describe the feeling of meeting someone exciting and vibrant, breaking away from a colourless, monotonous routine. The acoustic mix of "ViViD" was described by Kim as a groovy, guitar-driven remix which demonstrates Heejin's sense of rhythm.

=== Music videos ===
The music video of "ViViD" was shot in Seoul, featuring Heejin in a colorful environment reminiscent of the imagery described in the novel Alice's Adventures in Wonderland. It begins with a black-and-white scene featuring a mistress and a maid both played by Heejin, before shifting to full colour as the mistress leaves, telling the maid to clean her house before she returns. The maid begins to clean but quickly gets distracted, entering into numerous surreal set pieces. The music video was directed by Jo Beom-jin of the video production team VM Project Architecture, who previously worked on music videos for other South Korean pop acts, including those for "Whistle" by Blackpink and "Love Me Right" by Exo. The music video for the acoustic mix of "ViViD" was shot by Vams Jin in Paris.

== Reception and analysis ==
HeeJin debuted at number 31 on the South Korean weekly Gaon Album Chart on the first week of October, later entering at number 80 on that month's monthly album chart. In February 2020, HeeJin re-entered the weekly album chart along with various other albums from the Loona project, reaching its peak of number 18 during the first week of March. It also re-entered the monthly album chart, reaching its peak there of number 63 on March's chart.

Gladys Yeo, writing for NME, ranked "ViViD" as the 19th greatest Loona song out of 74, praising the song's charm as well as Heejin herself for being so polished at the age of 16. &Asian writer Julienne Loreto commended the song's eccentric sound and surreal music video, which she compared to the painter Yves Tanguy's work. Vitória Evelyn Mota Dias Ribeiro of Mackenzie Presbytarian University analyzed "ViViD" in the context of the Loonaverse, the fictional universe depicted by Loona's song lyrics and music videos. She contrasted promotional images showing Heejin in 19th-century Parisian gardens with the song's bizarre music video, demonstrating how the Loonaverse portrays a bridge between the real world and fantasy worlds. Ribeiro later connected the song's music video to themes of self-inhibition and disruption, pointing out how Heejin plays both the maid and the mistress, and how Heejin's refusal to clean the house shows a rejection of the "loop" created by the Loonaverse, a theme shared with other Loona music videos.

== Track listing ==
Credits adapted from Naver.

All lyrics are written by GDLO and MonoTree (Park Ji-yeon); all music is composed by MonoTree (G-High, Choi Young-kyung).

No.	Title	Length
1.	"ViViD" (Heejin solo)	3:22
2.	"ViViD (Acoustic Mix)"	3:36
Total length:		6:57

== Charts ==
=== Weekly charts ===
Chart (2016)	Peak position
South Korea (Gaon Album Chart)	31

Chart (2020)	Peak position
South Korea (Gaon Album Chart)	18

=== Monthly charts ===
Chart (2016)	Peak position
South Korea (Gaon Album Chart)	80

Chart (2020)	Peak position
South Korea (Gaon Album Chart)	63
