= YeoJin (single album) =

Single album by Loona
- Released: January 16, 2017
- Genre: Pop
- Length: 9:26
- Language: Korean
- Labels: Blockberry Creative; CJ E&M

Loona chronology
HaSeul (2016)	YeoJin (2017)	Love & Live (2017)

Loona pre-debut single album chronology
HaSeul (2016)	YeoJin (2017)	ViVi (2017)

Alternative cover
- HaSeul & YeoJin artwork

Music video
- "키스는 다음에 (Kiss Later)” on YouTube

YeoJin (also known as LOOΠΔ & YeoJin or HaSeul & YeoJin) is the fourth single album from South Korean girl group Loona's pre-debut project. It was released on January 16, 2017, by Blockberry Creative and distributed by CJ E&M as the fourth of 12 albums. It introduces member YeoJin and contains three tracks, her solo and the main track, "Kiss Later", a duet between HeeJin and HyunJin (two previously introduced members) titled "My Sunday", and a duet between her and HaSeul (the member introduced before her) titled "My Melody". Music Videos for each song were released once a day from January 16 to 18.

== Track listing ==
All lyrics written by GDLO and Shin Agnes (MonoTree), except where noted. All music composed by Kim Yoo-seok, Chu Dae-kwan, and GDLO (MonoTree), except where noted. All tracks arranged by Chu Dae-kwan and Kim Yoo-seok (MonoTree), except where noted.

No.	Title	Lyrics	Music	Arrangement	Length
1.	"Kiss Later (키스는 다음에)" (YeoJin solo)	Hwang Hyun, Shin Agnes (MonoTree)	Hwang Hyun (MonoTree)	Hwang Hyun (MonoTree)	3:20
2.	"My Sunday" (HeeJin and HyunJin duet)				3:03
3.	"My Melody" (HaSeul and YeoJin duet)				3:03
Total length:					9:26

== Charts ==
Chart	Peak position	Sales
South Korea Gaon Weekly Album Chart	17	14,655
South Korea Gaon Monthly Album Chart	59	14,655
