= HaSeul (single album) =

2016 single album by Loona

Single album by Loona
- Released: December 15, 2016
- Genre: Pop
- Length: 6:35
- Language: Korean
- Labels: Blockberry Creative; CJ E&M

Loona chronology
HyunJin (2016)	HaSeul (2016)	YeoJin (2017)

Music video
- "소년, 소녀 (Let Me In)” on YouTube

HaSeul (or LOOΠΔ & HaSeul) is the third single album from the pre-debut project of Loona, a South Korean girl group. It was released on December 15, 2016, by Blockberry Creative and distributed by CJ E&M. It introduces member HaSeul and contains two tracks, her solo "Let Me In", and a Christmas collaboration song between her, HeeJin, and HyunJin, titled "The Carol". Music videos for both songs were released simultaneously on December 15.

== Track listing ==
No.	Title	Lyrics	Music	Arrangement	Length
1.	"The Carol" (HeeJin, HyunJin, and HaSeul collaboration)	G-High, Park Asher (MonoTree)	G-High, Choi Young-kyung, Park Asher (MonoTree)	G-High, Park Asher (MonoTree)	3:27
2.	"Let Me In 소년, 소녀" (HaSeul solo)	Oreo	Oreo	Oreo	3:08
Total length:					6:35

== Charts ==
Chart	Peak position	Sales
South Korea Gaon Weekly Album Chart	6	10,982
South Korea Gaon Monthly Album Chart	63	10,982
