= (+ +) =

[+ +]
- Digital and Version B cover

EP by Loona
- Released: August 20, 2018
- Genres: Electropop; R&B
- Length: 18:09 (original); 35:58 (repackage)
- Language: Korean
- Label: Blockberry Creative
- Producers: Hwang Hyun; GDLO; Billie Jean; SlyBerry; Kim Jin-hyeong; Brooke Toia; Daniel Caesar; Ludwig Lindell; Adelen Steen; Yun Jong Sung

Loona chronology
Beauty & the Beat (2018)	[+ +] (2018)	[#] (2020)

Singles from [+ +]
- 1. "Favorite" Released: August 7, 2018; 2. "Hi High" Released: August 20, 2018

Repackage album cover
- Digital and Limited A cover

Singles from [X X]
- 1. "Butterfly" Released: February 19, 2019

[+ +] (read as "plus plus") is the debut extended play (EP) by South Korean girl group Loona. It was released on August 20, 2018, by Blockberry Creative and distributed by Danal Entertainment. The EP supported with the singles, "Favorite" and "Hi High", the latter being released the same day as the EP.

The EP was the second highest selling debut album by a girl group in 2018 with 52,823 physical copies sold. It has sold over 107,248 physical copies combined as of May 2020.

A repackaged version, [X X] (stylized as [× ×]; read as "multiple multiple") was released on February 19, 2019, by Blockberry Creative and distributed by Kakao M.

== Background ==
On October 2, 2016, Blockberry Creative announced that they would be debuting their first girl group through an 18-month long pre-debut project. Between October 2016 and January 2017 members HeeJin, HyunJin, HaSeul, and YeoJin were introduced. Then, between April and July 2017, members ViVi, Kim Lip, JinSoul, and Choerry were officially introduced. Finally, between November 2017 and March 2018, members Yves, Chuu, Go Won, and HyeJu (formerly Olivia Hye) were officially introduced.

On August 15, Blockberry published the official tracklist for the album and set the release date to August 20, 2018, 6 P.M. KST.

=== Repackaging release ===
Blockberry Creative released a 26-second teaser titled "X X" on October 14, 2018, on Loona's official YouTube channel, which featured events from the "Hi High" music video in reverse. Another teaser was released on January 1, 2019, following more teasers released once every week of January.

A repackaged version of the album named X X was released on February 19, 2019, with "Butterfly" as the lead promotional single along with five other tracks added to the original track list. It was distributed by Kakao M in both digital and physical formats.

== Singles ==
"Favorite" was released as a pre-debut single on August 7. "Hi High" was released as the lead single in conjunction with the EP on August 20. On August 17, a music video teaser was released.

"Butterfly" was released as the lead single for the repackaged version of the EP on February 19, 2019.

== Music and lyrics ==
The album opens with a dreamy instrumental intro titled "+ +" that features smooth synthesizers, artificial summery guitar licks, digital finger snappings, the continuous change of the melodies and the layering of whispered vocals and manipulated whistle samples. It is followed by the effervescent lead single "Hi High", which is a bright electropop, bubblegum pop and experimental pop song with bouncing beats, a vivacious tempo, explosive vocals, quirky beats and synths. "Favorite" (stylised as favOriTe) is a hip-hop inspired dance-pop and alternative R&B song incorporating a more charismatic and boisterous sound. Adding that with prominent trills and trumpeting synths propelling the melody to its dynamic chorus, plus a woozy bridge later in the song, the song condenses the group's innovative nature into a boisterous tune. The fourth track "Heat" (stylised as "열기 (9)") is a pop and R&B track with elements of moombahton and tropical house and features a more slower, mature and brassy sound with an EDM drop. "Perfect Love" is a synth-pop song that was described as the most "commercial sounding" song on the album by Blockberry Creative. The final track, "Stylish" is a pop song.

== Commercial performance ==
[+ +] debuted at number 2 on the Gaon Album Chart, at number 4 on the US World Albums and US Heatseekers Albums and at number 20 on the US Independent Albums.

The EP was the 6th best-selling album of August 2018, with 41,583 physical copies sold. On September, the EP sold 5,903 additional copies for a total of 47,486 copies sold. On October 15, it was reported that the album was the best-selling album by a girl group that debuted in 2018, after surpassing 50,000 copies sold. The album sold 52,823 physical copies in 2018, being the second best-selling album by a girl group that debuted in 2018 after Iz*One's Color*Iz, 15th best-selling album by a girl group and 80th best-selling album overall in 2018.

=== Repackage performance ===
[X X] debuted at number 4 on the US World Albums Chart with 2,000 downloads sold and 721,000 on-demand audio streams for its songs. It also debuted at number 8 on US Heatseekers Albums and at number 22 on the US Independent Albums. The EP also debuted at number 10 on the Gaon Album Chart and peaked at number 3 in its second week.

The EP was the 9th best-selling album of February 2019, with 26,563 physical copies sold. It was also the 17th best-selling album of March 2019, with 15,874 additional copies sold. It also charted at number 61 for the month of April 2019 with 2,837 additional copies sold, for a total of 45,274 copies sold.

== Accolades ==
=== Year-end lists ===
Album	Publication	Accolade	Rank	Ref.
[+ +]	Billboard	20 Best K-pop Albums of 2018	17	
[X X]	Billboard	The 25 Best K-pop Albums of 2019	5	

== Track listing ==
[+ +]
No.	Title	Lyrics	Music	Arrangement	Length
1.	"+ +"		Hwang Hyun; NOPARI; GDLO (MonoTree); Artronic Waves; Billie Jean (BADD); SlyBerry (BADD)	Hwang Hyun (MonoTree)	0:58
2.	"Hi High"	Jaden Jeong; GDLO; Hwang Hyun (MonoTree)	Hwang Hyun; GDLO (MonoTree); Mayu Wakusaka	Hwang Hyun; GDLO (MonoTree)	3:16
3.	"Favorite"	Kim Su-jung; Jaden Jeong	Billie Jean (BADD); Sophia Pae; SlyBerry; Kim Jin-hyeong (BADD)	Billie Jean (BADD); SlyBerry; Kim Jin-hyeong (BADD)	3:14
4.	"열기 (9)"	Seo Jung-Ah	Brooke Toia; Daniel Caesar; Ludwig Lindell; Adelen Steen	Brooke Toia; Daniel Caesar; Ludwig Lindell; Adelen Steen	3:30
5.	"Perfect Love"	Le'mon	Yun Jong Sung (MonoTree); Le'mon	Yun Jong Sung (MonoTree)	3:42
6.	"Stylish"	Iggy (OREO); Lambo (OREO)	Mike Macdermid; Emma O'Gorman; Marc Lian; David Brant; Iggy (OREO)		3:29
Total length:					18:09

[X X]
No.	Title	Lyrics	Music	Arrangement	Length
1.	"X X"		Kim Jinhyeong (BADD); SlyBerry (BADD); Billie Jean (BADD)	Kim Jinhyeong (BADD); SlyBerry (BADD); Billie Jean (BADD)	0:48
2.	"Butterfly"	G-high (MonoTree); Jaden Jeong	G-high (MonoTree)	G-high (MonoTree)	3:57
3.	"Satellite (위성)"	ZNEE (153/Joombas); Jaden Jeong	David Amber; Ashley Alisha (153/Joombas)	David Amber	3:09
4.	"Curiosity"	Park Jiyeon (MonoTree)	G-high (MonoTree); Ashley Alisha (153/Joombas)	G-high (MonoTree)	3:09
5.	"Colors (색깔)"	Dally; Jaden Jeong	Billie Jean (BADD); Hiekee; Kim Jinhyeong (BADD)	Billie Jean	3:15
6.	"Where You At"	Park Jiyeon (MonoTree)	Daniel Kim; Mekay; Ylva Dimberg	Daniel Kim	3:27
7.	"Stylish"	Iggy (OREO); Lambo (OREO)	Mike Macdermid; Emma O'Gorman; Marc Lian; David Brant; Iggy (OREO)		3:29
8.	"Perfect Love"	Le'mon	Yun Jong Sung (MonoTree); Le'mon	Yun Jong Sung (MonoTree)	3:42
9.	"열기 (Heat)"	Seo Jung-Ah	Brooke Toia; Daniel Caesar; Ludwig Lindell; Adelen Steen	Brooke Toia; Daniel Caesar; Ludwig Lindell; Adelen Steen	3:30
10.	"favOriTe"	Kim Su-jung; Jaden Jeong	Billie Jean (BADD); Sophia Pae; SlyBerry; Kim Jin-hyeong (BADD)	Billie Jean (BADD); SlyBerry; Kim Jin-hyeong (BADD)	3:14
11.	"Hi High"	Jaden Jeong; GDLO; Hwang Hyun (MonoTree)	Hwang Hyun; GDLO (MonoTree); Mayu Wakusaka	Hwang Hyun; GDLO (MonoTree)	3:16
12.	"+ +"		Hwang Hyun; NOPARI; GDLO (MonoTree); Artronic Waves; Billie Jean (BADD); SlyBerry (BADD)	Hwang Hyun (MonoTree)	0:58
Total length:					35:59

== Charts ==
=== [+ +] ===
Chart (2018)	Peak position
French Digital Albums (SNEP)	120
South Korean Albums (Gaon)	2
US Heatseekers Albums (Billboard)	4
US Independent Albums (Billboard)	20
US World Albums (Billboard)	4

=== [X X] ===
Chart (2018)	Peak position
French Digital Albums (SNEP)	55
South Korean Albums (Gaon)	3
US Heatseekers Albums (Billboard)	8
US Independent Albums (Billboard)	22
US World Albums (Billboard)	4

== Certifications and sales ==
Region	Certification	Certified units/sales
South Korea	—	68,316
United States	—	1,000

== Release history ==
Region	Date	Version	Format	Label
South Korea	August 20, 2018	[+ +] (Original)	Digital download; streaming; CD	Blockberry Creative
Various	August 20, 2018	[+ +] (Original)	Digital download; streaming	Blockberry Creative
South Korea	February 19, 2019	[X X] (Repackage)	Digital download; streaming; CD	Blockberry Creative; Kakao M
Various	February 19, 2019	[X X] (Repackage)	Digital download; streaming	Blockberry Creative
