= Loop (EP) =

- Digital cover

EP by Yves
- Released: May 29, 2024
- Genres: House; rock; electro-R&B
- Length: 12:05
- Languages: Korean; English
- Labels: Paix Per Mil; Warner Music Korea

Yves chronology
Yves (2017)	Loop (2024)	I Did (2024)

Singles from I Did
- 1. "Loop" Released: May 29, 2024

Loop is the debut extended play (EP) by South Korean singer Yves. It was released on May 29, 2024, through Paix Per Mil and consists of four tracks. The title track "Loop" features rapper Lil Cherry.

== Background and release ==
On November 14, 2017, Yves was revealed as the ninth member of Blockberry Creative girl group Loona and released her single album on November 28. She debuted as a member of Loona yyxy on May 30, 2018, before debuting with Loona as a full group on August 19, 2018.

On November 28, 2022, it was revealed that, following the removal of another member from Loona, Yves had filed to suspend her contract with Blockberry Creative. On June 16, 2023, Yves's exclusive contract was suspended.

On March 14 2024, label Paix Per Mil announced Yves had signed an exclusive contract with them and would pursue a solo career. On April 30, the label announced Yves would release her debut extended play in May.

Loop was released on May 29, along with a music video for the title track. Physical copies of the extended play were released with two versions.

== Music ==
First track "Diorama" is an electro-R&B song. The title track "Loop" is a dance house track featuring rapper Lil Cherry. "Afterglow" is a rock track sung completely in English, and "Goldfish" features acoustic guitar and the piano.

== Promotion ==
On the day of the extended play's release, Yves held a showcase at Ilchi Art Hall in Gangnam, Seoul, performing the title track "Loop" on stage.

Beginning on May 30, Yves began promoting Loop by performing the title track at South Korean music shows M Countdown, Music Bank, Show! Music Core, SBS The Show, and Show Champion.

== Reception ==
On May 31, 2024, Rolling Stone included "Loop" in their "All the Songs You Need to Know this Week" list.

=== Listicles ===
Publication	List	Work	Placement	Ref.
Billboard	The 20 Best K-Pop Albums of 2024 (So Far): Staff Picks	Loop	18	
NME	The 25 best K-pop songs of 2024	"Loop"	12	
Dazed	The 50 best K-pop tracks of 2024	"Loop"	Ranked	

== Track list ==
No.	Title	Lyrics	Arranger(s)	Length
1.	"Diorama"	TENE	IOAH	2:46
2.	"Loop" (featuring Lil Cherry)	Millic; IOAH; Lil Cherry	Millic; IOAH	2:43
3.	"Afterglow"	Millic	Millic	2:54
4.	"Goldfish" (금붕어)	Blah	Blah	3:42
Total length:				12:05

== Charts ==
Chart performance for I Did
Chart (2025)	Peak position
South Korean Albums (Circle)	13

== Release history ==
Release history for I Did
Region	Date	Format	Label
South Korea	May 29, 2024	CD	Paix Per Mil; Warner Music Korea
Various	May 29, 2024	Digital download; streaming	Paix Per Mil; Warner Music Korea
