= Bratty (musician) =

Mexican musical project

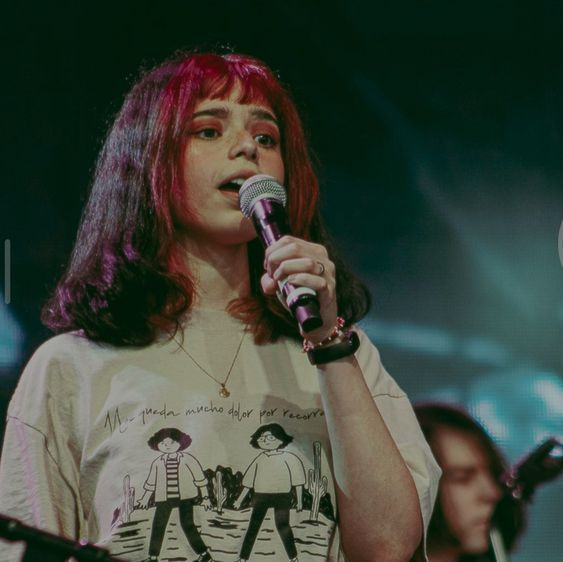

Background information
- Origin: Culiacán, Sinaloa, Mexico
- Genres: Bedroom pop; Garage rock
- Years active: 2017–present
- Labels: Aurora Central (2017-19); Universal (since 2020)
- Members: Jenny Juárez
- Website: www.bratty.mx

Bratty is the musical project of Jennifer Abigail Juárez Vázquez (born 2 August 2000), a Mexican singer-songwriter from Culiacán, Sinaloa. They have released two studio albums and their single "Ropa de bazar" (in collaboration with Ed Maverick) has received a quadruple platinum certification in Mexico.

== History ==
Jenny Juárez began her career as a singer-songwriter performing at local events and concerts in an acoustic format, later accompanied by the musicians Esmeralda Jiménez and Astrid Nava. In March 2018, Bratty released their first EP entitled "Todo está cambiando" (Everything is changing) and the single "Sobredosis de tempra", which gained recognition within the Mexican independent scene. In January 2019, they published the collaborative single with Ed Maverick entitled "Ropa de bazar", which has more than forty million streams.

In 2020, Bratty signed a contract with Universal Music México. The following year, they released a version of "Chocolate y nata", along with Carlos Sadness, and "tdbn (todo bien)", the first single from their second album of same name. Other singles from the album include "Lejos", "Tarde" and "Tuviste", the latter recorded in collaboration with Santiago Casillas from Little Jesus.

Bratty has participated in Vive Latino and was part of the lineup for the Festival Brillante 2021, held in Chapinería, Spain.10 They are amongst the first Mexican indie female artists to achieve commercial success. They also released a single in collaboration with Daniel Quién called "Otros colores". In 2023, Bratty performed for the first time at the Coachella music festival.

== Discography ==
=== Studio albums ===
Title	Album details
Delusión	Released: March 1, 2019; Label: Universal Music México; Formats: digital download, streaming, CD, LP
Tdbn	Released: May 19, 2021; Label: Universal Music México; Formats: digital download, streaming, CD
Tres	Released: November 3, 2023; Label: Universal Music México; Formats: digital download, streaming, CD, LP
Hoshi	Released: April 16, 2026; Label: Universal Music México; Formats: digital download, streaming, CD, LP

=== Extended plays ===
Title	Album details
Blue (Note: Blue was later taken down from all digital platforms, but the songs can still be found on YouTube and SoundCloud.)	Released: March 6, 2017; Label: Bratty; Formats: streaming
Todo Está Cambiando	Released: March 30, 2018; Label: Universal Music México; Formats: digital download, streaming, CD
Es Mi Fiesta Y Si Quiero Hago Un EP	Released: January 26, 2023; Label: Universal Music México; Formats: digital download, streaming, CD

=== Singles ===
==== As lead artist ====
List of singles, with year released, and album name shown
Title	Year	Album
"Aqui"	2017	Blue and Todo Está Cambiando
"Before Seeing Green"	2018	Todo Está Cambiando
"Todo Está Cambiando"	2018	Todo Está Cambiando
"Honey, No Estás"	2019	Delusión
"Tu Canción"	2020	Non-album single
"Quédate"	2020	Delusión
"Otros Colores" (with Daniel Quién)	2020	Aroma A Nostalgia
"Quiero Estar"	2021	Delusión
"Tdbn"	2021	Tdbn
"Tarde"	2021	Tdbn
"Tuviste"	2021	Tdbn
"Shh" (with Álvaro Díaz)	2021	Felicilandia and Es Mi Fiesta Y Si Quiero Hago Un EP
"Seguiremos Siendo" (with Depresión Sonora)	2022	Es Mi Fiesta Y Si Quiero Hago Un EP
"Fin Del Mundo" (with Cuco)	2022	Fantasy Gateway
"Continental" (with Nsqk and Méne)	2023	Es Mi Fiesta Y Si Quiero Hago Un EP
"Voy en Auto" (with Andru)	2023	Lo Haría Todo de Nuevo
"Radio"	2023	Tres
"Estos Días"	2023	Tres
"Agosto"	2023	Tres
"Estos Días"	2023	Tres
"Ya No Es Lo Mismo"	2023	Tres
"Otro Día Más" (Note: A Japanese version of the song titled "また同じ日" was released on September 18, 2025.) (with Barry B)	2025	Hoshi
"Karma" (with Natt Calma)	2025	Hoshi
"Tu Nombre"	2025	Hoshi
"El Silencio" (with Marc Seguí)	2026	Hoshi

==== As featured artist ====
List of singles as a featured artist, with year released, and album name shown
Title	Year	Album
"Alone" (Raylen featuring Bratty)	2018	Non-album single
"Ropa de Bazar" (Ed Maverick featuring Bratty)	2019	Non-album single
"Salvador (Acústica)" (Beta featuring Bratty)	2019	Non-album single
"Basquiat" (YNFA featuring Bratty)	2021	Non-album single
"Chocolate y Nata" (Carlos Sadness featuring Bratty)	2021	Non-album single
"Lo Q Yo Por Ti" (Andry Kiddos featuring Bratty)	2025	Non-album single

=== Promotional singles ===
List of promotional singles, with year released, and album name shown
Title	Year	Album
"Sobredosis de Tempra"	2018	Non-album singles
"A Really Short Christmas Song"	2018	Non-album singles
"Una Canción Muy Corta de Navidad"	2020	Non-album singles
"Mi Habitación" (with Yawners)	2022	Es Mi Fiesta Y Si Quiero Hago Un EP
"¿Y Cómo?" (with Hinds)	2022	Es Mi Fiesta Y Si Quiero Hago Un EP
"Siempre Quiero +"	2026	Hoshi

=== Guest appearances ===
List of other appearances, showing year released, other artist(s) credited and album name
Title	Year	Other artist(s)	Album
"Bichota"	2021	RENEE	Non-album song
"Things Will Be Fine (Remix)"	2022	Metronomy	Non-album song
"Fin Del Mundo"	2022	Cuco	Fantasy Gateway
"Aibo"	2025	Yves	Soft Error
