= Chuu =

South Korean singer and actress (born 1999)

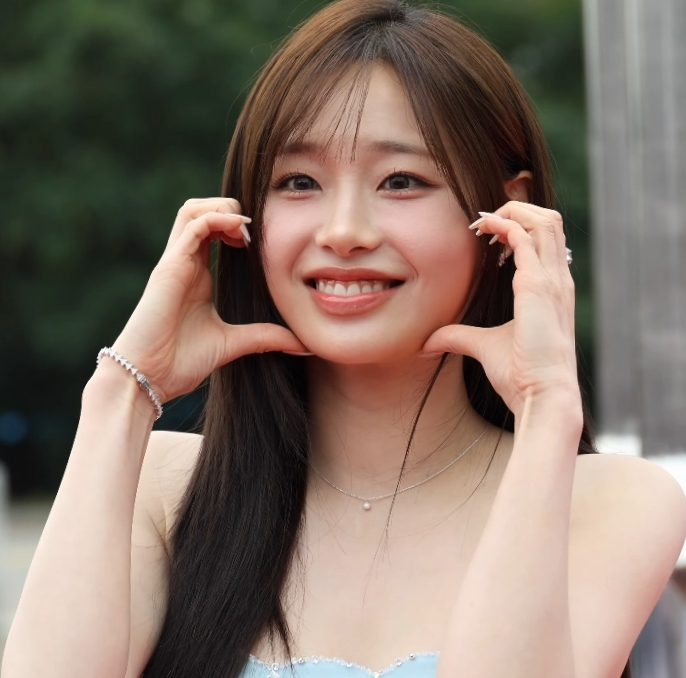
- Chuu in 2025
- Born: Kim Ji-woo; October 20, 1999 (age 27); Cheongju, South Korea
- Education: Hanlim Multi Art School
- Occupations: Singer; actress
- Musical career
- Genres: K-pop; dance-pop
- Instrument: Vocals
- Years active: 2017–present
- Labels: Blockberry Creative; ATRP; Chu Company
- Formerly of: Loona; yyxy

Korean name
- Hangul: 김지우
- RR: Gim Jiu
- MR: Kim Chiu
- IPA: kim d͡ʑiu

Stage name
- Hangul: 츄
- RR: Chu
- MR: Ch'u

Kim Ji-woo (Korean: 김지우; pronounced [kim d͡ʑiu], born October 20, 1999), known professionally as Chuu (츄), is a South Korean singer and actress. She is a former member of the South Korean girl group Loona and its sub-unit, yyxy.

== Early life ==
Kim Ji-woo was born on October 20, 1999, in Cheongju, South Korea. She is the eldest of three children and has two younger brothers. For her audition, she sang "Halo" by Beyoncé. Her stage name "Chuu" is derived from saying her given name quickly. She graduated from Cheongju's Saet-byul Elementary School and San-nam Middle School.

== Career ==
=== 2017–2020: Debut with Loona and solo activities ===
On December 14, 2017, Chuu was revealed as the tenth member of the South Korean idol girl group Loona. As part of the group's pre-debut release strategy, on, December 28, she released her single album Chuu with "Heart Attack" as its title track. Chuu reached number 8 on the Gaon Album Chart. She was introduced as part of Loona's third sub-unit Loona yyxy. The sub-unit includes members Yves, Go Won, and Hyeju. Their EP Beauty & the Beat was released on May 30, 2018 and reached number 4 on the Gaon Album Chart. She officially debuted with Loona as a whole on August 20 with the EP [+ +], which peaked at number 2 on the Gaon Album Chart.

In 2019, Chuu, alongside with member Yves, went viral with a tweet after a fan of the group made a hoax tweet of the two women being lesbian Korean billionaires.

On May 10, 2019, Chuu made her acting debut and starred in the web drama Dating Class as Han Eun-sol. In July to September, she co-hosted the second season of the variety show Insane Quiz Show with MJ of Astro and Ilhoon of BtoB. The show brings in two celebrity guests each episode and has them partake in various challenges with the hosts.

In January 2020, Chuu appeared at MBC's 2020 Lunar New Year Idol Star Championships. However, MBC was inundated with criticism because it was discovered that a male staff member pulled her hair. In March 2020, Chuu competed in King of Mask Singer under the name "Spring Girl", a character who dressed in a spring outfit with flowers in her hair and a flat paper mask that covers her eyes and mouth. She was eliminated in the second of the two days of competition. In December 2020, she co-starred in Running Girls, an Mnet show where five K-pop idols form a running team and try out different running courses in South Korea.

=== 2021–2022: Web series and Blockberry Creative departure ===
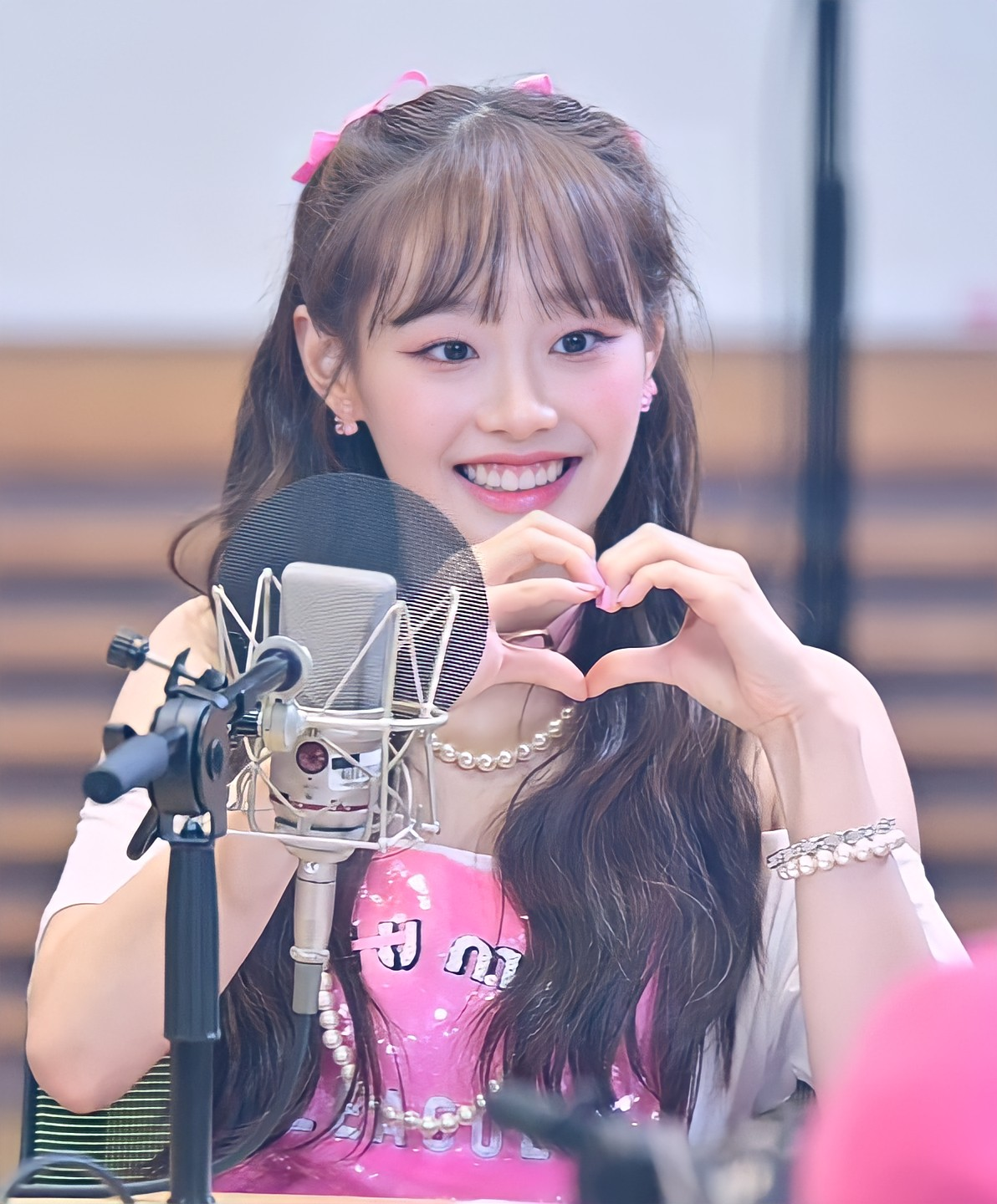
Chuu in June 2022

In 2021, Chuu started to host her own web series on YouTube called Chuu Can Do It where she spreads awareness about the need to protect the Earth through environmentally friendly practices. Chuu also hosted Hauteur, a web series that was made in collaboration with Lotte Department Store to help promote their store among generation Z. In March 2021, Chuu was a regular panelist in the Channel A show Steel Troops where she comments on teams from Korea's armed forces competing against each other. She appeared as a model for a television commercial of Dong-a Otsuka's Pocari Sweat. She also appeared in a television commercial for Samsung Galaxy Store in May 2021, South Korean chicken brand "Chicken Maru", mobile RTS game "Warpath", and BC Card. She participated in the reality documentary show Law of the Jungle for the episode "Spring Special in Jeju". At the end of 2021, Chuu filed an application for a provisional injunction against her agency, Blockberry Creative, to suspend the exclusive contract. It was also reported that in April 2022, she had founded her own company, with herself as the CEO.

On June 27, 2022, Chuu released the single "Lullaby" with B.I as a collaboration with Dingo Music. On August 11, it was announced that Chuu would release "One and Half", a remake of the 1994 track by Two Two, on September 4. On October 16, Chuu released a remake of the 1999 Park Hye-kyung song "Confession" as the theme song of the 2022 film Similar. On November 25, Blockberry Creative announced on the official fancafe that Chuu had been expelled from Loona, citing "reports of abuse of power, such as Chuu's abusive language towards our staff". Chuu was then caught up in rumors of power abuse, transfer, and bullying within her company. Blockberry Creative refused to reveal evidence concerning the rumors of power abuse to the public, facing criticism and skepticism from fans, with some industry professionals who had previously worked with Chuu questioning the allegations made against her. On December 5, Chuu released "Dear My Winter" with South Korean R&B singer George as part of Lotte Shopping's "Songs for You" series.

=== 2023–present: Solo debut with Howl and ATRP departure ===
On February 23, 2023, Chuu released "Let's Love" with Kim Yo-han, which is part of Project Restless. In April 2023, Chuu signed an exclusive contract with a new entertainment company, ATRP. On September 18, ATRP announced that Chuu would be making her debut as a solo artist on October 18, with her first extended play Howl and a lead single of the same name.

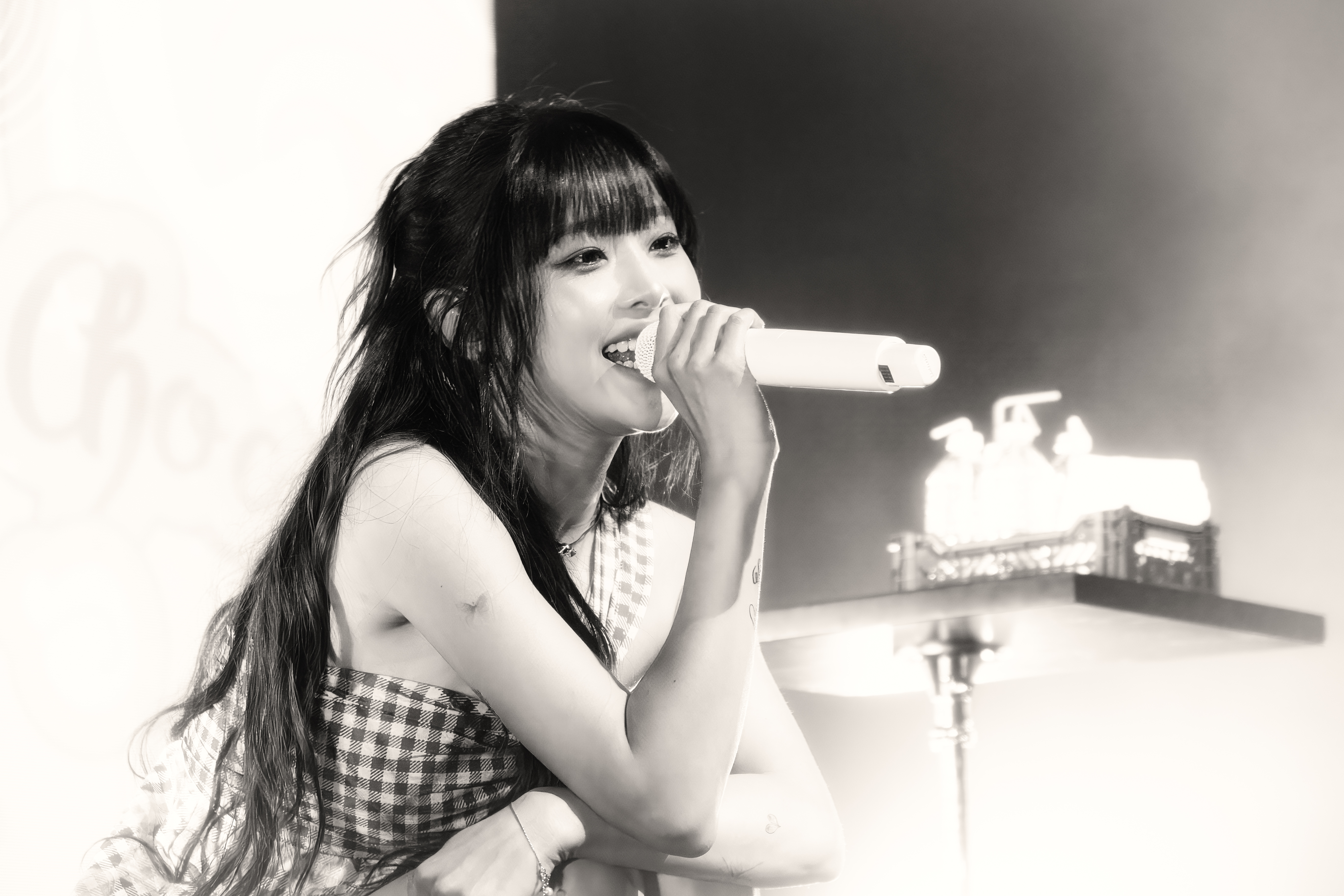
Chuu during the "Strawberry Rush" fan-con in Tacoma in July 2024

On February 13, 2024, Chuu released a digital single "Chocolate", with an English-language version of the song being released the next day. On May 22, ATRP confirmed Chuu was filming a music video in Australia for her second album, to be released in June. On May 29, it was officially announced that Chuu would be releasing her second extended play Strawberry Rush on June 25. The music video for the lead single of the same name was released together with the album. On August 2, it was announced that Chuu would be returning to acting in the fantasy romance drama My Girlfriend Is the Man!, based on webtoon of the same name.

On March 28, 2025, ATRP announced that Chuu's third extended play Only Cry in the Rain would be released on April 21. On December 15, it was announced that Chuu would release her first studio album XO, My Cyberlove in January, with a lead single of the same name. The music video for the title track was released alongside the album on January 7. On May 7, singer Hanhae and comedian Moon Se-yoon released the song "Airplane" featuring Chuu, a cover of the song originally by the band Turtles.

On April 28, 2026, Lezhin Entertainment announced that Chuu would be starring in a webtoon-based short-form drama Wild Eyes. Chuu released the single "Rule", featuring Heize, on July 2. On July 10, ATRP announced that Chuu's exclusive contract has been terminated. On September 3, Chuu transferred her management to her self-founded agency, Chu Company.

== Philanthropy ==
On December 28, 2022, Chuu announced through her YouTube channel that all proceeds from the merchandise sold at the Jiwoo store were donated to the Korea Music Power Plant to improve the welfare of musicians.

== Personal life ==
In February 2018, Chuu graduated from Hanlim Multi Art School alongside her Loona groupmate Kim Lip.

In February 2021, in the wake of a wave of bullying allegations against various stars in the K-pop industry, Chuu was falsely accused of bullying when she was in school. The accuser apologized for the false claims and Blockberry Creative announced that they would be taking legal action against them.

== Discography ==
=== Studio albums ===
List of studio albums, showing selected details, chart positions, and sales figures
Title	Details	Peak chart positions	Sales
Title	Details	KOR	Sales
XO, My Cyberlove	Released: January 7, 2026; Label: ATRP, KT Genie; Formats: CD, LP, digital download, streaming	8	KOR: 34,019

=== Extended plays ===
List of extended plays, showing selected details, chart positions, and sales figures
Title	Details	Peak chart positions	Sales
Title	Details	KOR	Sales
Howl	Released: October 18, 2023; Label: ATRP, KT Genie; Formats: CD, digital download, streaming; Track listing: 1. "Howl"; 2. "Underwater"; 3. "My Palace"; 4. "Aliens"; 5. "Hitchhiker"	3	KOR: 49,545
Strawberry Rush	Released: June 25, 2024; Label: ATRP, KT Genie; Formats: CD, digital download, streaming; Track listing: 1. "Strawberry Rush"; 2. "Honeybee"; 3. "Daydreamer"; 4. "Lucid Dream"; 5. "Chocolate"; 6. "Chocolate" (English version)	12	KOR: 55,902
Only Cry in the Rain	Released: April 21, 2025; Label: ATRP, KT Genie; Formats: CD, LP, digital download, streaming; Track listing: 1. "Only Cry in the Rain"; 2. "Back in Town"; 3. "Kiss a Kitty"; 4. "Je T'aime"; 5. "No More"	15	KOR: 32,642

=== Singles ===
==== As lead artist ====
List of singles as lead artist, showing year released, chart positions, and name of the album
Title	Year	Peak chart positions	Album
Title	Year	KOR	Album
"Heart Attack" (Note: credited to Loona, but the track is a solo by Chuu)	2017	—	Chuu
"Lullaby" (자장가) (with B.I)	2022	— (Note: "Lullaby" did not enter the Circle Digital Chart, but peaked at number 81 and 103 on the component Download Chart and BGM Chart, respectively.)	Non-album singles
"One and a Half" (일과 이분의 일)	2022	87	Non-album singles
"Howl"	2023	— (Note: "Howl" did not enter the Circle Digital Chart, but peaked at number 30 on the component Download Chart.)	Howl
"Chocolate" (Note: "Chocolate (English Ver.)" was released on February 14, 2024.)	2024	— (Note: "Chocolate" did not enter the Circle Digital Chart, but peaked at number 27 on the component Download Chart.)	Strawberry Rush
"Strawberry Rush"	2024	— (Note: "Strawberry Rush" did not enter the Circle Digital Chart, but peaked at number 23 on the component Download Chart.)	Strawberry Rush
"Only Cry in the Rain"	2025	— (Note: "Only Cry in the Rain" did not enter the Circle Digital Chart, but peaked at number 27 on the component Download Chart.)	Only Cry in the Rain
"XO, My Cyberlove"	2026	— (Note: "XO, My Cyberlove" did not enter the Circle Digital Chart, but peaked at number 12 on the component Download Chart.)	XO, My Cyberlove
"Rule" (featuring Heize)	2026	— (Note: "Rule" did not enter the Circle Digital Chart, but peaked at number 25 on the component Download Chart.)	Non-album single
I Love You (사랑합니다)	2026	— (Note: "I Love You" did not enter the Circle Digital Chart, but peaked at number 43 on the component Download Chart.)	Non-album single
"—" denotes releases that did not chart or were not released in that region.

==== As featured artist ====
List of singles as featured artist, showing year released, chart positions, and name of the album
Title	Year	Peak chart positions	Album
Title	Year	KOR Down.	Album
"BBB" (HUS featuring Chuu)	2025	152	Moosa
"Airplane" (비행기) (Hanhae and Moon Se-yoon featuring Chuu)	2026	29	Non-album single

=== Promotional singles ===
List of promotional singles, showing year released and name of the album
Title	Year	Peak chart positions	Album
Title	Year	KOR Down.	Album
"World Is One 2021" (with Kim Yo-han, Eric Bellinger)	2021	—	Non-album singles
"Starlight" (with Lee Hyun, Lee Gi-kwang, Joohoney, Hyeongjun, Jung Yeon-joo)	2021	—	Non-album singles
"Dear My Winter" (with George)	2022	—	Non-album singles
"Let's Love" (썸밍아웃) (with Kim Yo-han)	2023	—	Project Restless
"Our Nights Are More Beautiful Than Your Days" (우리의 밤은 당신의 낮보다 아름답다)	2023	—	Non-album single
"I Like You" (좋아 좋아)	2023	—	[THE SEASONS Vol II. 10] ᐸAKMU's Long day Long nightᐳ ReːWake x CHUU
"A Beautiful Farewell" (아름다운)	2023	—	I am Re:Born #1
"Even Though I Hate You, I Love You" (미워도 사랑하니까) (with Lee Young-hyun, Lee Ye-joon, Yuju, Sin Ye-young, and Lee Ye-ji)	2026	32	Non-album single

=== Soundtrack appearances ===
List of soundtrack appearances, showing year released, chart positions, and name of the album
Title	Year	Peak chart positions		Album
Title	Year	KOR	US World	Album
"We Wanna Be Adults" (Note: Credited as Kim Ji-woo.) (어른이 되고 싶어)	2015	—	—	Princess Pring OST
"Spring Flower" (봄꽃)	2020	— (Note: "Spring Flower" did not enter the Gaon Digital Chart, but peaked at number 114 on component BGM chart.)	5	Memorials OST
"Hello" (좋아서 그래) (with Lee Hyeop)	2021	— (Note: "Hello" did not enter Gaon Digital Chart, but peaked at position 112 and 179 on components Download chart and BGM chart, respectively.)	25	Fling at Convenience Store OST
"Loving U" (좋아서 좋아해)	2021	— (Note: "Loving U" did not enter Gaon Digital Chart, but peaked at position 108 and 163 on components BGM chart and Download chart, respectively.)	—	Revolutionary Sisters OST
"Brunch" (브런치)	2022	— (Note: "Brunch" did not enter Circle Digital Chart, but peaked at position 143 on component Download chart.)	—	Daily JoJo OST
"Confession" (고백)	2022	— (Note: "Confession" did not enter Circle Digital Chart, but peaked at position 43 and 49 on components Download chart and BGM chart, respectively.)	—	Ditto OST
"Fox Rain" (여우비)	2024	174	—	The Moon During the Day Webtoon OST
"Loveholic"	2025	— (Note: "Loveholic" did not enter Circle Digital Chart, but peaked at position 43 and 42 on components Download chart and BGM chart, respectively.)	—	Just For Meeting You OST
"Star"	2025	— (Note: "Loveholic" did not enter Circle Digital Chart, but peaked at position 62 and 19 on components Download chart and BGM chart, respectively.)	—	My Girlfriend Is the Man! OST
"Cutie Pie"	2025	—	—	Maru Is a Puppy OST
"—" denotes releases that did not chart or were not released in that region.

=== Compilation appearances ===
List of compilation appearances, showing year released, and name of the album
Title	Year	Album
"Beautiful Landscape" (아름다운 강산) (with Kim Mi-sun)	2022	DNA Singer – Fantastic Family Round 7
"Arari" (아라리) (as Gaeul)	2022	Life Reset Re-Debut Show – A Star Is Born (Episode 3)
"Back in Time" (시간을 거슬러) (as Gaeul)	2022	Life Reset Re-Debut Show – A Star Is Born (Episode 3)

=== Other charted songs ===
List of other charted songs, showing year released, chart positions, and name of the album
Title	Year	Peak chart positions	Album
Title	Year	KOR Down.	Album
"Underwater"	2023	98	Howl
"My Palace"	2023	128	Howl
"Aliens"	2023	129	Howl
"Hitchhiker"	2023	137	Howl
"Honeybee"	2024	99	Strawberry Rush
"Daydreamer"	2024	105	Strawberry Rush
"Lucid Dream"	2024	108	Strawberry Rush
"Back in Town"	2025	127	Only Cry in the Rain
"Kiss a Kitty"	2025	136	Only Cry in the Rain
"Je T'aime"	2025	135	Only Cry in the Rain
"No More"	2025	141	Only Cry in the Rain
"Canary"	2026	94	XO, My Cyberlove
"Cocktail Dress"	2026	88	XO, My Cyberlove
"Limoncello"	2026	106	XO, My Cyberlove
"Teeny Tiny Heart"	2026	91	XO, My Cyberlove
"Love Potion"	2026	108	XO, My Cyberlove
"Heart Tea Bag"	2026	109	XO, My Cyberlove
"Hide & Seek"	2026	100	XO, My Cyberlove
"Loving You!" (첫눈이 오면 그때 거기서 만나)	2026	99	XO, My Cyberlove

=== Songwriting credits ===
All credits are adapted from the Korea Music Copyright Association.

Title	Year	Artist	Album
"Lullaby" (자장가)	2022	B.I featuring Chuu	Non-album single

== Videography ==
=== Music videos ===
Title	Year	Director(s)	Ref.
"World Is One"	2021	Kim In-tae (AFF Studio), Im Woo-sung (AFF Studio), Luke Im	
"One and a Half"	2022	Lee Yoo-young, Lee Jae-hyeon (SNP Film)	
"Underwater"	2023	Yoo Sungkyun (Sunny Visual)	
"Howl"	2023	Yoo Sungkyun (Sunny Visual)	
"Hitchhiker"	2023	Yoo Sungkyun (Sunny Visual)	
"Strawberry Rush"	2024	Sky (Sunny Visual)	
"Honeybee"	2024	Sunny Visual	
"Pink Cloud"	2024	Annie Chung	
"Only Cry in the Rain"	2025	Sunny Visual	
"Back in Town"	2025	Sunny Visual	
"XO, My Cyberlove"	2026	Sunny Visual	
"Canary"	2026	Sunny Visual	
"Rule" (featuring Heize)	2026	Kim Hyeonsu (Chameleon Media)	

== Filmography ==
=== Television series ===
Year	Title	Role	Ref.
2025	My Girlfriend Is the Man!	Kang Min-joo	

=== Web series ===
Year	Title	Role	Notes	Ref.
2019	Dating Class	Han Eun-sol		
TBA	Wild Eyes	Eun-woo	Short-form drama	

=== Television shows ===
Year	Title	Role	Notes	Ref.
2020	Running Girls	Cast member	With Hani, Sunmi, YooA and Chungha	
2020	King of Mask Singer	Contestant	As Spring Girl (Episode 247–248)	
2021	Steel Troops	Panelist	Season 1 & 3	
2021	Law of the Jungle – Spring Special in Jeju	Cast member	Episode 446–448	
2021	Family Register Mate	Co-host		
2021	Wild Idol	Panelist		
2022	Mystery Duet	Panelist		
2022	Stage Up	Host		
2022	The Dreamers	Host	with Ha Seok-jin, Jang Dong-seon and Kim Yun-hee	
2022–2023	Mr. Trot	Master	Season 2	
2025	When Our Kids Fall in Love	Co-host		

=== Web shows ===
Year	Title	Role	Notes	Ref.
2019	Insane Quiz Show Season 2	Co-host	with MJ and Illhoon	
2020–present	Chuu Can Do It	Host	Produced by DIA TV	
2022	Terrace On	Host	with Leeteuk and Lee Won-il	
2022	If you like it, it will ring!	Host	with Jinyoung, Lee Eun-ji and Hong Seok-cheon	
2023	Star of Star Girls	Cast member	with Song Yuqi and Billlie's Tsuki	

== Concerts and tours ==
=== Howl in USA ===
Date	City	Country	Venue	Ref.
December 3, 2023	Los Angeles	United States	The Orpheum Theatre	
December 5, 2023	Oakland	United States	Paramount Theatre	
December 7, 2023	Denver	United States	Fillmore Auditorium	
December 11, 2023	Washington, D.C.	United States	MGM National Harbor	
December 13, 2023	New York	United States	Kings Theatre	
December 15, 2023	Atlanta	United States	Coca-Cola Roxy	
December 17, 2023	Dallas	United States	Music Hall at Fair Park	

=== Strawberry Rush in Americas ===
Date	City	Country	Venue	Ref.
July 17, 2024	Los Angeles	United States	The Orpheum Theatre	
July 19, 2024	San Francisco	United States	Palace of Fine Arts	
July 21, 2024	Tacoma	United States	Pantages Theater	
July 24, 2024	Phoenix	United States	The Van Buren	
July 26, 2024	Dallas	United States	House of Blues	
July 28, 2024	New Orleans	United States	The Fillmore	
July 31, 2024	Detroit	United States	The Fillmore	
August 3, 2024	Indianapolis	United States	Egyptian Room at Old National Centre	
August 5, 2024	New York	United States	The Town Hall	
August 7, 2024	Santiago	Chile	Teatro Cupula	
August 10, 2024	São Paulo	Brazil	Studio Stage	
August 13, 2024	Mexico City	Mexico	Foro Puebla	

== Awards and nominations ==
Name of the award ceremony, year presented, category, nominee of the award, and the result of the nomination
Award ceremony	Year	Category	Nominee / Work	Result	Ref.
APAN Music Awards	2020	Idol Champ Entertainer – Female	Chuu	Won	
Blue Dragon Series Awards	2023	Best New Female Entertainer	Love Alarm Clap! Clap! Clap!	Nominated	
Brand of the Year Awards	2021	Entertainer Idol of the Year (Female)	Chuu	Nominated	
Universal Superstar Awards	2024	Universal Style Wannabe	Chuu	Won	

== See also ==
- List of one-word stage names
