= Nail (EP) =

- Digital cover

EP by Yves
- Released: April 17, 2026
- Genres: House; alternative R&B; alt-pop; hyperpop
- Length: 15:45
- Labels: Paix Per Mil; Warner Korea

Yves chronology
Soft Error (2025)	Nail (2026)	Cute & Anxiety (2026)

Singles from Nail
- 1. "Nail" Released: April 17, 2026

Nail (stylized in all caps) is the fourth extended play by South Korean singer Yves. Released by Paix Per Mil on April 17, 2026, the EP contains five tracks and features singers Lolo Zouaï and Lexie Liu on title track "Nail" and track "Break It", respectively.

== Background and release ==
In March 2026, Paix Per Mil announced Yves would be releasing her fourth extended play in April. Nail was released on April 17, along with a music video for the title track of the same name. On June 19, the music video for the track "Break It" was released, including an appearance from the featured singer Lexie Liu.

Directly following her first writing credit in her own solo work with the release of "Ex Machina", Nail features multiple tracks written or co-written by Yves. Yves stated she "played a big part in the songwriting and production" compared to before, and noted "It" as a track whose creation and subject matter she was most proud of. In addition to the music, Yves also contributed the club concept to the album.

While working on the album, singer Lolo Zouaï reached out to Yves about a possible collaboration. The track "Nail" was sent to Zouaï, who resonated with it and joined on the track a week before post-production started.

== Music and lyrics ==
For the first track, "It", Yves stated she chose to write about "what comes beyond death" in a way where her fans would "be able to listen to it and find comfort". Second track "Halo" features repetitive lyrics and a "hypnotic" rhythm. Yves stated she recorded some of the song while running to add to the breathless feel. The title track "Nail" is a hip-hop and R&B song whose lyrics play on the similar pronunciation of the English word nail and Korean word for tomorrow. The track is a collaboration with artist Lolo Zouaï, who also contributed lyrics. Fourth track "Break It" is a hyperpop song featuring singer Lexie Liu, who also contributed lyrics. The final track "Birth" is an electronic song where Yves affirms her own journey debuting as a solo artist after promoting in a group. The song was placed at the end of the album to thematically create a cycle with the first song "It". When asked to recommend a single song from the EP, Yves chose "Birth", stating she hopes fans can become revitalized through listening to it.

== Promotion ==
To promote the album, Yves embarked on her Yves Europe Tour 2026, spanning from April 16 to April 28. The first stop on the tour was Manchester Academy, and was followed by a performance separate from the tour at EartH Hall in London as a part of a program of 15 shows celebrating the 15th anniversary of NTS Radio on April 17th. The tour reportedly sold out all stops. Immediately following the Europe tour, Yves embarked on the Yves Tour: The Americas beginning on May 5 in Vancouver, Canada and ending on June 7 in Bogotá, Colombia.

== Reception ==
"Nail" was included in Fader's weekly song recommendation list for the week of April 22, 2026, with Steffanee Wang stating "Yves’s track record for making cunty pop songs is 100% right now."

=== Listicles ===
Publication	List	Placement	Ref.
Billboard	The 25 Best K-Pop Albums of 2026 (So Far), Ranked: Staff Picks	8	

== Track listing ==
Track listing for Nail
No.	Title	Lyrics	Music	Length
1.	"It"	Yves	IOAH; MABOKPIL	2:48
2.	"Halo"	IOAH; Yves	IOAH	4:02
3.	"Nail" (featuring Lolo Zouaï)	Yves; Dopein; Lolo Zouaï	IOAH; Lolo Zouaï	2:42
4.	"Break It" (featuring Lexie Liu)	Dopein; Lexie Liu	IOAH; Lexie Liu	3:04
5.	"Birth"	Yves	IOAH; Yves	3:06
Total length:				15:45

== In popular culture ==
The track "Nail" was included on the official soundtrack for the 2026 association football simulation video game EA Sports FC 27.

== Charts ==
Chart performance for Nail
Chart (2025)	Peak position
South Korean Albums (Circle)	14

== Release history ==
Release history for Nail
Region	Date	Format	Label
South Korea	April 17, 2026	CD	Paix Per Mil; Warner Music Korea
Various	April 17, 2026	Digital download; streaming	Paix Per Mil; Warner Music Korea
