= Loona yyxy =

Sub-unit of South Korean girl group Loona

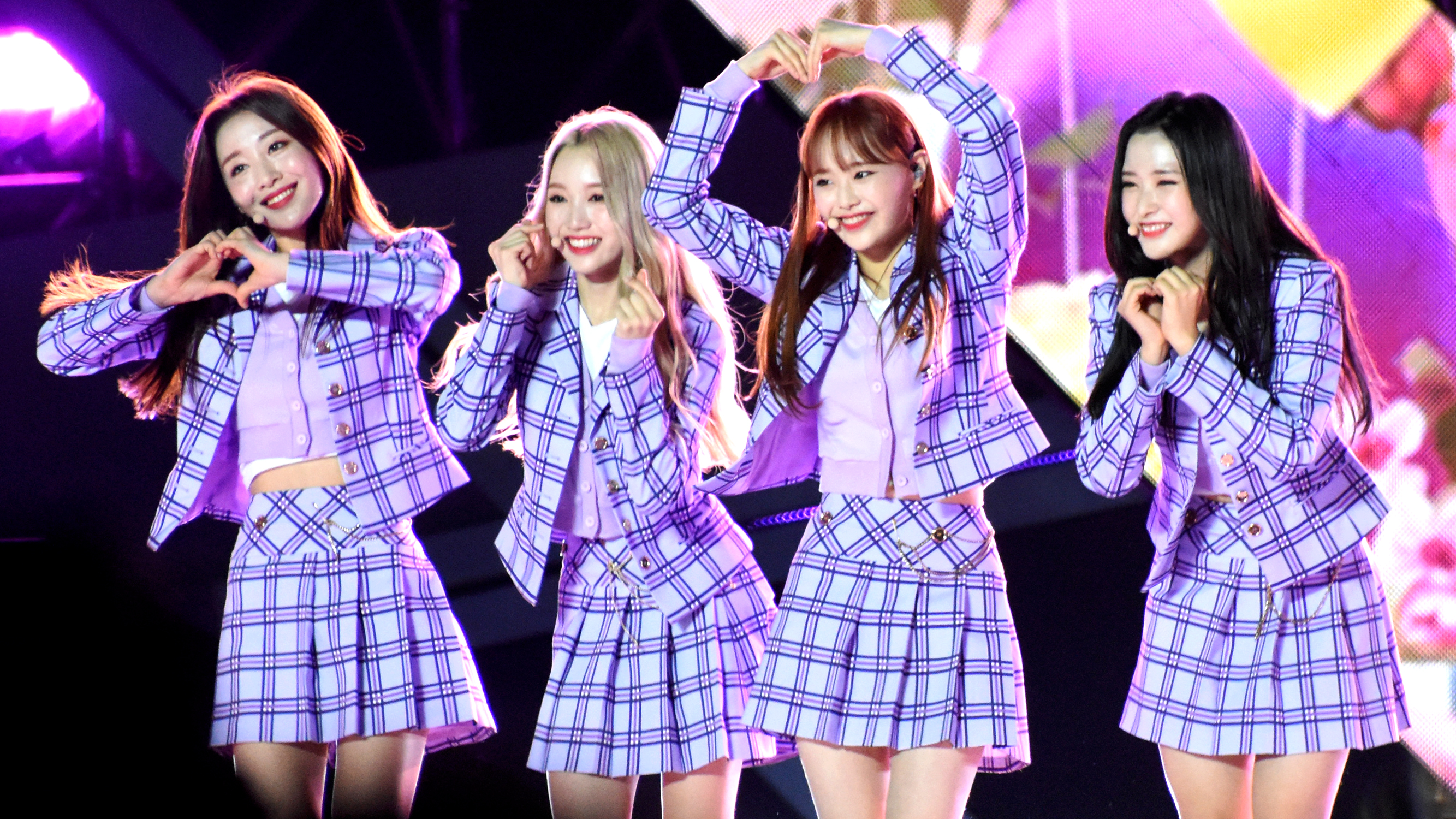
- Loona yyxy in September 2018; From left to right: Yves, Go Won, Chuu, and Hyeju

Background information
- Origin: Seoul, South Korea
- Genre: K-pop
- Years active: 2018
- Label: Blockberry Creative
- Spinoff of: Loona
- Members: Yves; Hyeju; Chuu; Go Won

Loona yyxy (Korean: 이달의 소녀 yyxy; an abbreviation for Youth youth by young) is the third sub-unit of the South Korean girl group Loona, formed through a pre-debut project titled "Girl of the Month". The unit consisted of 4 members, Yves, Go Won, Chuu, and Hyeju (formerly Olivia Hye). Currently the unit consists in 3 members, without Chuu, who was removed from Loona and consequently the lineup in November 2022. They debuted with their first extended play titled Beauty & the Beat on May 30, 2018. They were the last sub-unit to debut with the pre-debut project, before the group debuted as a whole with their extended play titled [+ +].

== History ==
=== Pre-debut: Revealing of first two members ===
The first member, Yves, was revealed on November 14, 2017. She debuted with her single album Yves with the title track "New" on November 28. Being the first introduced out of the last 4 members, the next to be revealed was Chuu. On December 14, at midnight KST, a teaser photo of the latter was revealed with a caption "A mysterious girl is coming". The next single titled Chuu was released on December 27, with the title track "Heart Attack". It is currently the most viewed solo video from Loona on YouTube.

=== 2018: Revealing of last two members, debut with Beauty & the Beat ===
On January 14, 2018, the teaser photo of the third member, Go Won, was revealed with a caption "Your God person puts an apple tree in the middle of a garden and says, do what you like, guys, oh, but don't eat the apple. Surprise surprise." On January 30, 2 weeks later, her single Go Won was released with the title track "One&Only". The final member was then hinted at in a teaser, on March 1. A teaser with all the revealed members, along with a dark figure that appears to be the 12th member. It was titled "Cinema Theory: Up & Line" Their final member, Hyeju, was officially revealed with a teaser photo on March 17, at midnight KST. On March 28, a teaser for her title track "Egoist" was revealed as well, which would feature previously revealed member Jinsoul. On March 29, her single Olivia Hye was released with the title track "Egoist" featuring Jinsoul, and the second track featuring Go Won titled "Rosy".

On April 26, a teaser was released titled "youth youth by young" that introduces that their sub-unit name is "yyxy" and the members as well. On May 19, a teaser photo was released revealing the title track "love4eva" and that it would be featuring Grimes, as some of her fans asked her to produce the group, as well. On May 24, a group photo teaser was released. On May 28, a highlight medley was released for their upcoming extended play. On May 30, their title track along with their EP Beauty & the Beat was released featuring Grimes.

== Members ==
=== Current ===
- Yves (이브) (Leader)
- Chuu (츄)
- Hyeju (혜주)
- Go Won (고원)

== Discography ==
=== Extended plays ===
List of extended plays, with selected details, chart positions and sales
Title	Details	Peak chart positions		Sales
Title	Details	KOR	US World	Sales
Beauty & the Beat	Released: May 30, 2018; Label: Blockberry Creative; Formats: CD, digital download, streaming	4	6	KOR: 18,138

=== Singles ===
List of singles, showing year released and album name
Title	Year	Album
"love4eva" (featuring Grimes)	2018	Beauty & the Beat

== Videography ==
=== Music videos ===
Song title	Year	Director(s)	Ref.
"love4eva"	2018	Digipedi	
