= Soft Error =

- Digital cover

EP by Yves
- Released: August 7, 2025
- Length: 16:00
- Labels: Paix Per Mil; Warner Music Korea

Yves chronology
I Did (2024)	Soft Error (2025)	Nail (2026)

Singles from Soft Error
- 1. "White Cat" Released: July 24, 2025; 2. "Soap" Released: August 7, 2025

Soft Error is the third extended play by South Korean singer Yves. It was released by Paix Per Mil on August 7, 2025, and contains six tracks, including double title tracks "White Cat" and "Soap" featuring PinkPantheress. A deluxe version titled Soft Error: X was released on October 15 containing new track "Ex Machina".

== Background and release ==
On July 21, 2025, Paix Per Mil released a teaser for the pre-release single "White Cat" and announced Yves's third EP Soft Error to be released on August 7. "White Cat" was released on July 24 along with a music video. On July 30, the track listing was revealed, including lead track "Soap" featuring PinkPantheress and side track "Aibo" featuring Bratty. On August 4, a teaser was released for the music video of "Soap". On August 7, Soft Error was released along with a music video for the lead track.

On October 15, Yves released a deluxe version titled Soft Error: X including the track "Ex Machina", which had previously been revealed during her Asia and Australia tour.

== Promotion ==
On August 3, Yves performed "White Cat" on Inkigayo, a South Korean music show. On August 4, she performed songs from the EP at Show! Music Core's Ulsan Summer Festival. The following week, Yves promoted "Soap" at music shows Music Bank, Show! Music Core, and Inkigayo. On August 15, she performed "Soap" among other songs at the One Universe Festival 2025.

On August 18, Yves embarked on her Asia and Australia tour, where she promoted the EP in nine cities.

== Reception ==
Professional ratings
Review scores
Source	Rating
IZM	3.5/5 stars
NME	4/5 stars

Rhian Daly of NME gave the EP four out of five stars, stating Yves was a "a distinctive artist not to underestimate" and that the song "Soap" seemed "tailor-made for Yves and [PinkPatheress]".

"Soap" was included in The Fader's weekly music recommendation list, "Songs You Need In Your Life", with Steffanee Wang writing "it's three queens coming together to maximize their joint slay". The song was also included in "The Round Up", Nylon's weekly list.

=== Listicles ===
Publication	List	Work	Placement	Ref.
Dazed	The 30 Best K-pop Tracks of 2025	"Do You Feel It Like I Touch"	Placed	
The Fader	The 50 Best Albums of 2025	Soft Error: X	48	
Idology	Top 20 Albums of 2025	Soft Error	Placed	
NME	The 25 Best K-pop Songs of 2025	"White Cat"	16	

== Track listing ==
Track listing for Soft Error
No.	Title	Lyrics	Music	Length
1.	"White Cat"	0jV3	IOAH; Park Ye-chan	3:22
2.	"Soap" (featuring PinkPantheress)	0jV3; HYNGSN; IOAH; Jesse Saint John; MABOKPIL; Nicholas Weiss; PinkPantheress; Rebecca Black	0jV3; HYNGSN; IOAH; Saint John; MABOKPIL; Weiss; PinkPantheress; Black	2:27
3.	"Aibo" (featuring Bratty)	0jV3; Bratty	0jV3; Bratty; IOAH; Park Ye-chan	2:21
4.	"Do You Feel It Like I Touch"	0jV3; blah	blah; IOAH	3:05
5.	"Study"	IOAH	IOAH	2:01
6.	"Mom"	0jV3	IOAH	2:44
Total length:				16:00

Track listing for Soft Error: X
No.	Title	Lyrics	Music	Length
1.	"Ex Machina"	0jV3; IOAH; Yves	IOAH	3:02
2.	"White Cat"	0jV3	IOAH; Park Ye-chan	3:22
3.	"Soap" (featuring PinkPantheress)	0jV3; HYNGSN; IOAH; Jesse Saint John; MABOKPIL; Nicholas Weiss; PinkPantheress; Rebecca Black	0jV3; HYNGSN; IOAH; Saint John; MABOKPIL; Weiss; PinkPantheress; Black	2:27
4.	"Aibo" (featuring Bratty)	0jV3; Bratty	0jV3; Bratty; IOAH; Park Ye-chan	2:21
5.	"Do You Feel It Like I Touch"	0jV3; blah	blah; IOAH	3:05
6.	"Study"	IOAH	IOAH	2:01
7.	"Mom"	0jV3	IOAH	2:44
Total length:				19:02

Notes

- "Soap" samples "Sugar Water Cyanide" by Rebecca Black.

== Charts ==
Chart performance for Soft Error
Chart (2025)	Peak position
South Korean Albums (Circle)	7
UK Independent Albums (Official Charts)	47

== Release history ==
Release history for Soft Error
Region	Date	Format	Label
South Korea	August 7, 2025	CD	Paix Per Mil; Warner Music Korea
Various	August 7, 2025	Digital download; streaming	Paix Per Mil; Warner Music Korea
