= I Did (EP) =

- Digital cover

EP by Yves
- Released: November 14, 2024
- Genres: Pop; R&B; indie-pop; soul
- Length: 14:22
- Languages: Korean; English
- Labels: Paix Per Mil; Warner Music Korea

Yves chronology
Loop (2024)	I Did (2024)	Soft Error (2025)

Singles from I Did
- 1. "Tik Tok" Released: August 30, 2024; 2. "Viola" Released: November 14, 2024; 3. "Dim" Released: April 1, 2025

I Did is the second extended play (EP) by South Korean singer Yves. It was released on November 14, 2024, through Paix Per Mil and consists of five tracks, including the lead single "Tik Tok" and title track "Viola". A deluxe edition, titled I Did: Bloom (Deluxe), was released on January 17, 2025, featuring two additional tracks, "Bird" and "See You in Hell".

== Background and release ==
Yves released her debut EP Loop on May 29, 2024, with the title track of the same name. On August 30, the single "Tik Tok" was released. Yves announced her second extended play I Did on October 31, with a release date of November 14, 2024 at 6pm KST. The first music video teaser for "Viola" was released on November 10, followed by a second teaser on November 12. The music video was released alongside the EP on November 14.

On January 17, 2025, Yves released a deluxe edition of the EP, I Did: Bloom, which featured two new tracks, "Bird" and "See You in Hell". In early 2025, the track "Dim" gained popularity online, reaching number one on TikTok's Viral 50 chart. A remix EP titled Dim ∞ was released on April 1, 2025.

== Promotion ==
Beginning on November 15, Yves promoted the lead single "Viola" on South Korean music programs Music Bank, Show! Music Core, and Inkigayo.

In October, Yves had announced her Apple Cinnamon Crunch Tour to begin in December. On November 26, she announced the North American branch of the tour to follow. Yves embarked on the tour in support of I Did on December 4, beginning in Berlin, Germany. The North American branch began on January 16, 2025 in Montreal, Canada and ended on February 4 in Tacoma, Washington. A Latin American branch of the tour was announced on February 20 to begin on April 1 in Mexico City, Mexico and end on April 11 in São Paulo, Brazil.

On January 21, during the North American branch of the tour, Yves appeared on the talk show Good Day New York and performed "Viola". On March 7, she released a live performance of "See You in Hell" in collaboration with Vevo Studios, followed by a performance of "Hashtag" on March 14.

== Reception ==
Professional ratings
Review scores
Source	Rating
IZM	3/5 stars

Son Min-hyun of IZM gave the EP 3 out of 5 stars, recommending the songs "Viola" and "Hashtag".

The EP was nominated at the 22nd Korean Music Awards for Best K-pop Album.

=== Listicles ===
Publication	List	Work	Placement	Ref.
Billboard	The 25 Best K-Pop Albums of 2024: Staff Picks	I Did	8	
Elle	The 22 Best New Songs We Heard in November 2024	"Viola"	Placed	
Idology	2024 Music Video Picks	"Viola"	Placed	

== Track list ==
Credits adapted from Melon.

Track listing for I Did
No.	Title	Lyrics	Music	Arranger(s)	Length
1.	"Viola"	Millic; IOAH	Millic; IOAH	Millic; IOAH; Park Ye-chan	2:55
2.	"Hashtag"	IOAH; 0JV3	IOAH; 0JV3	IOAH	2:07
3.	"Gone Girl"	IOAH	IOAH	IOAH	2:55
4.	"Tik Tok"	Millic; IOAH	Millic; IOAH	IOAH	3:04
5.	"Dim"	Millic	Millic	Millic	3:21
Total length:					14:22

Track listing for I Did: Bloom (Deluxe)
No.	Title	Lyrics	Music	Arranger(s)	Length
6.	"Bird"	Millic	Millic	Millic	4:08
7.	"See You in Hell"	Choah	IOAH; Choah	IOAH	3:13
Total length:					21:46

=== Notes ===
- "Dim" and "Bird" are stylized in all caps.
- "See You in Hell" is stylized in sentence case.

== Charts ==
Chart performance for I Did
Chart (2025)	Peak position
South Korean Albums (Circle)	16
UK Independent Albums (OCC)	35

== Release history ==
Release history for I Did
Region	Date	Format	Label
South Korea	November 14, 2024	CD	Paix Per Mil; Warner Music Korea
Various	November 14, 2024	Digital download; streaming	Paix Per Mil; Warner Music Korea
