= XO, My Cyberlove =

2026 album by Chuu

- Digital cover

Studio album by Chuu
- Released: January 7, 2026
- Length: 25:54
- Languages: Korean; English
- Labels: ATRP; KT Genie

Chuu chronology
Only Cry in the Rain (2025)	XO, My Cyberlove (2026)

Singles from XO, My Cyberlove
- 1. "XO, My Cyberlove" Released: January 7, 2026

Professional ratings
Review scores
Source	Rating
IZM	2.5/5 stars

XO, My Cyberlove is the debut studio album by South Korean singer Chuu. It was released by ATRP on January 7, 2026, and contains nine tracks, including the lead single of the same name.

== Background ==
On November 20, 2025, ATRP announced that Chuu would be making a comeback in early January 2026, with her first solo studio album since her debut. On December 15, concept photos and videos showing her with a new blonde look were released, with further teaser images and videos throughout the rest of December. The tracklist was revealed on December 24. On January 6, in line with continued hints of the album unveiled previously, the music video teaser for the title track, "XO, My Cyberlove" was made available. The full album came out on January 7.

== Track listing ==
Track listing for XO, My Cyberlove
No.	Title	Lyrics	Music	Producer(s)	Length
1.	"XO, My Cyberlove"	Seo Ji-eum	Grant Knoche; Shari Short; Tayler Buono	Knoche	3:22
2.	"Canary"	Seo Jeong-ah	George Ionut Rad; Lyza	Nutu	2:56
3.	"Cocktail Dress"	Seo Ji-eum	Igor Chojniak; Dennis DeKo Kordnejad; Hanif Hitmanic	Chojniak; Kordnejad; Hitmanic	2:44
4.	"Limoncello"	Tessie	Shy Martin; Gabrielle Stok; Lauren Aquilina	GG	2:39
5.	"Teeny Tiny Heart"	Znee	Daniel Scheffman; Ole Bjørn; Emili Jürgens; Camille Thorsen	Bjørn; Scheffman	3:11
6.	"Love Potion"	Seo Jeong-ah	Tk Kayembe; Kyla Mcmillan; Aston	Kayembe	2:40
7.	"Heart Tea Bag"	Znee	Ryan Raines; Gabe Reali; Caroline Clark Burns	Boyco	3:06
8.	"Hide & Seek"	Lilja Scarfi; Eirik Gejendemsjø; Yelo; Un:named	Rasmus Palmgren; Scarfi; Gejndemsjø; Yelo	Raz Palm	2:33
9.	"Loving You!" (첫눈이 오면 그때 거기서 만나; Cheonnuni omyeon geuttae geogiseo manna; 'When the first snow falls, let's meet there')	Seo Jeong-ah	Charlie McClean; Chelcee Grimes; Martin	McClean	2:43
Total length:					25:54

== Charts ==
=== Weekly charts ===
Weekly chart performance for XO, My Cyberlove
Chart (2026)	Peak position
South Korean Albums (Circle)	8

=== Monthly charts ===
Monthly chart performance for XO, My Cyberlove
Chart (2026)	Position
South Korean Albums (Circle)	36

== Release history ==
Release history for XO, My Cyberlove
Region	Date	Format	Label
South Korea	January 7, 2026	CD; LP	ATRP; KT Genie
Various	January 7, 2026	Digital download; streaming	ATRP; KT Genie
