= Beauty & the Beat (EP) =

- Digital and Limited cover

EP by Loona yyxy / Loona
- Released: May 30, 2018
- Length: 15:27
- Language: Korean
- Labels: Blockberry Creative; Vlending Co.; Windmill ENT

Loona yyxy / Loona chronology
Olivia Hye (2018)	Beauty & the Beat (2018)	++ (2018)

Singles from Beauty & the Beat
- 1. "Love4eva" Released: May 30, 2018

Music video
- "Love4eva" on YouTube

Beauty & the Beat (stylized as beauty&thebeat) is the debut extended play by Loona yyxy, a sub-unit of South Korean girl group Loona. It was released on May 30, 2018, by Blockberry Creative. The album consists of five tracks and features Canadian singer Grimes. The unit consisted of four members: Yves, Chuu, Go Won, and HyeJu (formerly Olivia Hye). In November 2022, Chuu was removed from the girl group Loona and consequently from the unit.

== Promotion and release ==
The group began teasing the album on May 10, 2018, and continued releasing photos of the group and individual members, along with image teasers of each track, during the following weeks. On May 20, it was confirmed that Grimes would be featured on the "Love4eva" through teasers from the group and by Grimes herself.

The album was released on May 30, along with the official music video for "Love4eva". The group performed "Love4eva" live for the first time on June 2, at the Premier Greeting – Line&Up event, which also officially introduced Loona's full lineup to fans.

== Track listing ==
Credits adapted from Naver.

No.	Title	Lyrics	Music	Length
1.	"Dal Segno"		Artronic Waves, Billy Jean (BADD), SlyBerry	1:07
2.	"Love4eva" (featuring Grimes)	Jaden Jeong, daLLy / daryly	E-Tribe; Billie Jean (BADD); Kim Jin-hyeong (BADD); Narae (BADD)	3:40
3.	"Frozen"	Hwang Hyun (MonoTree)	Hwang Hyun (MonoTree)	3:29
4.	"One Way"	Gamdongis	Gamdongis, Seo Jae-ha, Kim Yeong-seong	3:29
5.	"Rendezvous 18.6y"	G-High (MonoTree)	G-High (MonoTree), Son Go-eun (MonoTree)	3:27
Total length:				15:29

Notes

- All track titles are stylized in all lowercase

== Charts ==
Chart (2018)	Peak position
South Korean Albums (Gaon)	4
US World Albums (Billboard)	6
