= Howl (Chuu EP) =

EP by Chuu
- Released: October 18, 2023
- Length: 15:41
- Language: Korean
- Labels: ATRP; KT Genie

Chuu chronology
Chuu (2017)	Howl (2023)	Strawberry Rush (2024)

Singles from Howl
- 1. "Underwater" Released: October 10, 2023; 2. "Howl" Released: October 18, 2023

Howl is the debut extended play by South Korean singer Chuu. It was released on October 18, 2023, through ATRP and consists of five tracks, including the lead single "Underwater" and title track "Howl". It peaked at number three on the Circle Chart.

== Background ==
On November 25, 2022, BlockBerry Creative announced that Chuu had been removed from Loona, citing an "abuse of power". In April 2023, Chuu signed an exclusive contract with a new entertainment company, ATRP. On September 18, ATRP announced that Chuu would be making her debut as a solo artist on October 18, with her first extended play Howl and the lead single of the same name.

== Release and promotion ==
Howl was released on October 18, 2023, at 6PM KST. She promoted "Howl" on various South Korean music programs such as Behind, Idolchart, and MHNSports. She also hosted a fan showcase.

== Track listing ==
Track listing for Howl
No.	Title	Lyrics	Music	Arranger(s)	Length
1.	"Howl"	Seo Ji-eum	Lise Sofie Reppe; Marion Skogseth Bjørsvik; Emily-Madelen Aarsheim Harbakk; Jason OK; Musikality	Marion Skogseth Bjørsvik; Jason OK; Musikality	2:49
2.	"Underwater"	Kim Chae-ah	Carl-Phillip Josef Ström; Joel Gunnarsson; Lova Sönnerbo; Musikality	Carl-Phillip Josef Ström; Musikality	3:24
3.	"My Palace"	Jeong Min-ji; Oh Yoo-won	Jason OK; Alessandra Günthart; Mårten Fohlin; Musikality	Jason OK; Musikality	3:21
4.	"Aliens"	Seo Ji-eum	Daniel Wessborg; Carlyle Fernandes; Alexandra Shanahan; Lina Hansson	Daniel Wessborg; Carlyle Fernandes	3:00
5.	"Hitchhiker"	Lee Ang-doo (153/Joombas)	Luke Fitton; Ferras Alqaisi; Musikality	Luke Fitton; Musikality	3:05
Total length:					15:41

== Charts ==
Chart (2023)	Peak position
South Korean Albums (Circle)	3
