= Yves (single album) =

- Digital and Version B cover

Single album by Loona
- Released: November 28, 2017
- Genres: Synth-pop; soultronica
- Length: 6:24
- Language: Korean
- Labels: Blockberry Creative; Vlending Co., Ltd.; Windmill ENT

Loona chronology
Mix & Match (2017)	Yves (2017)	Chuu (2017)

Loona pre-debut single album chronology
Choerry (2017)	Yves (2017)	Chuu (2017)

Yves solo chronology
Yves (2017)	Loop (2024)

Alternative cover
- Version A artwork

Music video
- "New" on YouTube

Yves is the ninth single album from South Korean girl group Loona's pre-debut project. It was released digitally on November 28 by Blockberry Creative. It officially introduces member Yves and contains two tracks, "New" and "D-1".

== Track listing ==
Credits adapted from Melon.

No.	Title	Lyrics	Music	Arrangement	Length
1.	"New" (Yves solo)	Park Ji-yeon (MonoTree), Jaden Jeong	Daniel Caesar, Ludwig Lindell (Caesar & Loui), Brooke Toia	Daniel Caesar, Ludwig Lindell (Caesar & Loui), Brooke Toia	3:05
2.	"D-1" (Yves solo)	G-High (MonoTree)	G-High, Choi Young-kyung (MonoTree)	G-High (MonoTree)	3:19
Total length:					6:24

== Charts ==
Chart	Peak position	Sales
South Korea Gaon Weekly Album Chart	18	12,213
South Korea Gaon Monthly Album Chart	51	12,213
