= Yves (singer) =

South Korean singer (born 1997)

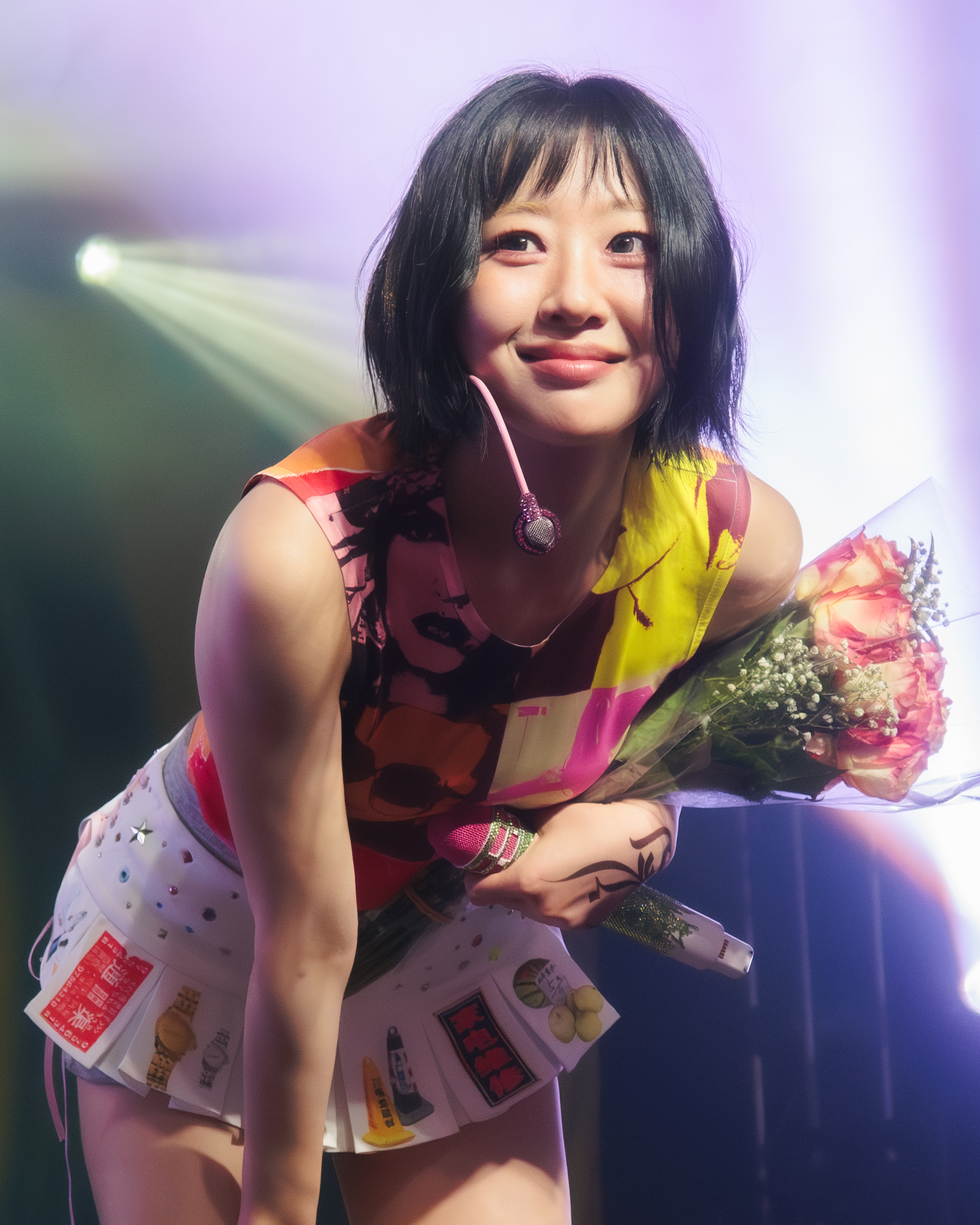
- Yves in 2026
- Born: Ha Soo-young; May 24, 1997 (age 29); Busan, South Korea
- Occupation: Singer
- Years active: 2017–present
- Musical career
- Genres: K-pop; Alternative pop; electronic
- Instrument: Vocals
- Labels: Paix Per Mil; Blockberry Creative
- Member of: Loona; Loona yyxy

Korean name
- Hangul: 하수영
- RR: Ha Suyeong
- MR: Ha Suyŏng

Ha Soo-young (Korean: 하수영; born May 24, 1997), known professionally as Yves (이브), is a South Korean singer and songwriter. She rose to prominence as a member of the South Korean girl group Loona and its sub-unit Loona yyxy. She made her debut as a solo artist on May 29, 2024, with the release of the extended play (EP) Loop.

== Early life ==
Ha Soo-young was born on May 24, 1997, in Busan, South Korea. She lived in Busan until elementary school before moving to Yangsan.

From a young age, Yves expressed an interest in becoming a singer. She became more inspired to pursue a career in music after watching the South Korean girl group Wonder Girls perform their debut song "Irony" in 2007. She later attended the Dance Up Academy in Busan and the Dream Vocal & Dance Academy in Seoul.

== Career ==
=== 2017–2023: Debut with Loona and lawsuits against Blockberry Creative ===
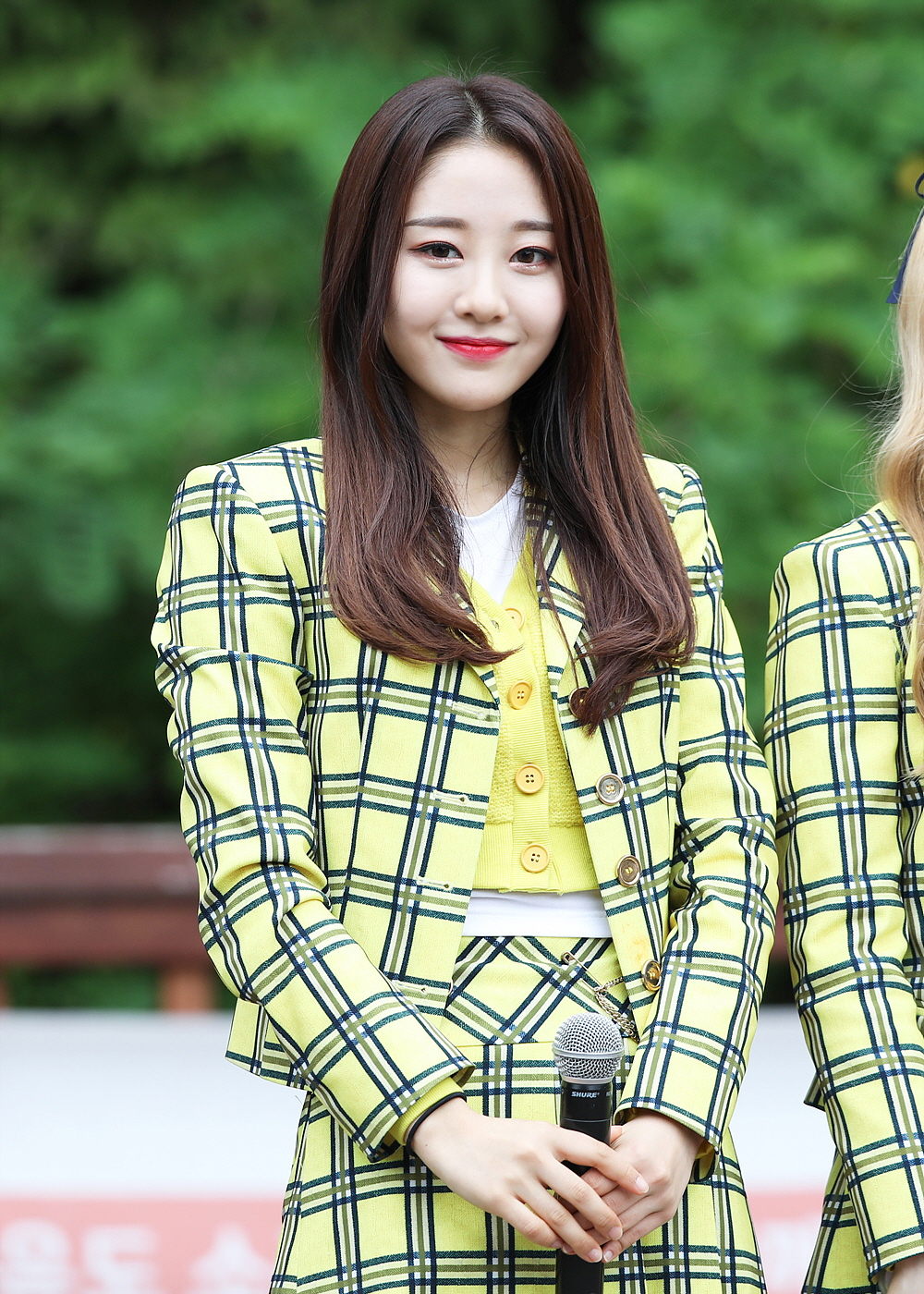
Yves in 2018

On November 14, 2017, Yves was revealed as the ninth member of the South Korean idol girl group Loona. As part of the group's pre-debut release strategy, on November 28, she released her self-titled single album containing two tracks, the single "New" and "D-1". In December 2017, Yves participated on the song "The Carol 2.0" with Loona members ViVi and Choerry. She also featured on the second track "Girl's Talk" on other Loona member Chuu's self-titled single album.

Yves was introduced as part of Loona's third sub-unit Loona yyxy. The sub-unit includes members Chuu, Go Won and HyeJu. Their EP, Beauty & the Beat, was released on May 30, 2018, and reached number 4 on the Gaon Album Chart. She officially debuted with the whole group on August 20 with the EP [+ +], which peaked at number 2 on the Gaon Album Chart.

In May 2020, Yves became the new MC of the variety show Fact iN Star alongside Yoo Jae-hwan.

On November 28, 2022, it was reported that Yves and all Loona members, except for Hyunjin and ViVi, had filed a lawsuit to suspend their contracts with Blockberry Creative, citing a loss of trust in the company. Blockberry Creative has denied these allegations. On January 13, 2023, it was revealed that Yves, along with Haseul, Go Won, HyeJu, and YeoJin, lost the trial against Blockberry Creative regarding the termination of their exclusive contracts. However, on June 16, The Seoul High Court's 5th Civil Cases Division ruled in the five's favor, allowing them to suspend their exclusive contracts with Blockberry Creative.

=== 2024–present: Solo debut and EPs ===
On March 14, 2024, Yves had signed an exclusive contract with Paix Per Mil. On May 14, she released "Breath" for the original soundtrack of Missing Crown Prince. On May 29, she made her solo debut with the release of her debut EP Loop. On August 30 she released the single "Tik Tok". On October 31, it was announced that Yves would be releasing her second EP I Did on November 14. A deluxe version of her second EP titled I Did: Bloom (Deluxe) was released on January 17, 2025. On April 1, Yves released DIM ∞, an EP containing previously released "Dim" along with four new versions of the song after it topped TikTok's US 'Viral 50' chart.

On July 21, 2025, Paix Per Mil announced Yves's third EP Soft Error to be released on August 7. The EP was preceded by the pre-release single "White Cat" on July 24. On August 7, she released the EP with title track "Soap" featuring PinkPantheress, topping multiple iTunes Album country charts. On October 10, she joined PinkPantheress to remix the latter's song "Stars" for the remix album Fancy Some More?. On October 15, Yves released Soft Error: X, a deluxe version of her third EP with the new track "Ex Machina". On December 19, labelmate Blah released the song "Falling for You" featuring Yves along with a music video starring the two. Yves was featured on Underscores's "Do It" remix on January 23, 2026.

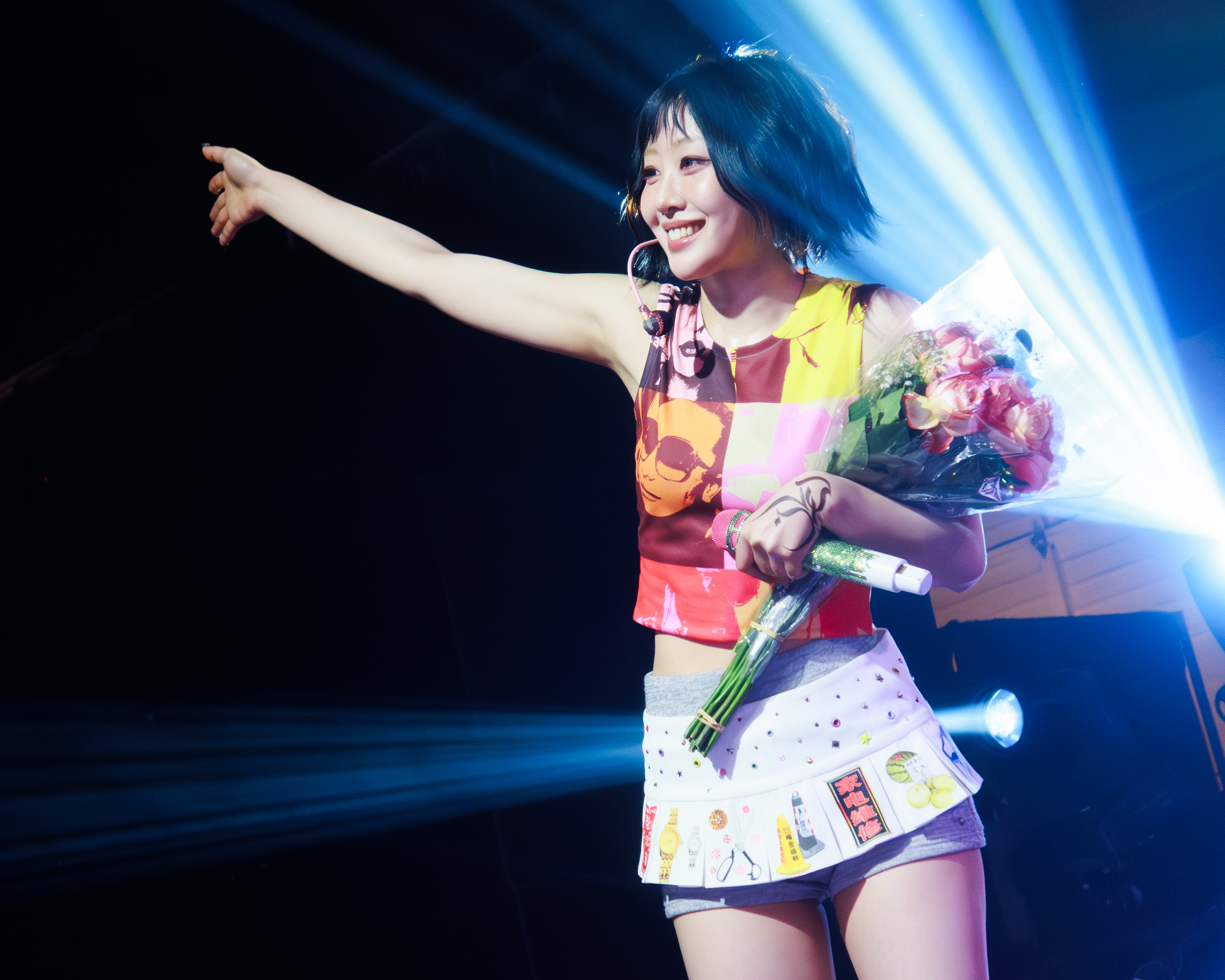
Yves performing on The Americas tour in Seattle

On April 17, Yves released her fourth extended play Nail, with the title track featuring singer Lolo Zouaï. The title track was later included on the official soundtrack for the 2026 association football simulation video game EA Sports FC 27. To promote the EP, Yves embarked on her sold out Yves Europe Tour, beginning on April 16 in Manchester. Immediately following the Europe tour, Yves embarked on the Yves Tour: The Americas beginning on May 5 in Vancouver, Canada and ending on June 7 in Bogotá, Colombia. On July 22, 2026, Yves was featured on Lexie Liu's remix of "Pop Girl". Yves's fifth EP, Cute & Anxiety is scheduled for release on November 20 with double singles "Hysteric" and "Adam" being released on October 27.

== Public image ==
Yves uses apple imagery as a part of her brand as an artist, which fans widely associate with the forbidden fruit concept and the LGBTQ+ community. In an interview with Hypebae, she acknowledged her "large" LGBTQ+ fan base, although she does not plan to publicly disclose her own sexuality.

== Discography ==
=== Extended plays ===
List of extended plays, showing selected details, chart positions, and sales figures
Title	Details	Peak chart positions		Sales
Title	Details	KOR	UK Indie	Sales
Loop	Released: May 29, 2024; Label: Paix Per Mil, Warner Music Korea; Formats: CD, digital download, streaming	13	—	KOR: 20,552
I Did	Released: November 14, 2024; Label: Paix Per Mil, Warner Music Korea; Formats: CD, digital download, streaming	16	35	KOR: 27,094
Soft Error	Released: August 7, 2025; Label: Paix Per Mil, Warner Music Korea; Formats: CD, digital download, streaming	7	47	KOR: 19,766
Nail	Released: April 17, 2026; Label: Paix Per Mil, Warner Music Korea; Formats: CD, digital download, streaming	14	—	KOR: 16,325
Cute & Anxiety	Scheduled: November 20, 2026	TBA	TBA	TBA

=== Compilation albums ===
List of compilation albums, showing selected details, chart positions, and sales figures
Title	Details	Peak chart positions	Sales
Title	Details	KOR	Sales
Apple Cinnamon Crunch	Released: July 10, 2025; Label: Paix Per Mil, Warner Music Korea; Format: LP; Track listing: 1. "Loop"; 2. "Tik Tok"; 3. "Gone Girl"; 4. "Diorama"; 5. "Goldfish" (금붕어); 6. "See You in Hell" (Studio Live); 7. "Hashtag"; 8. "Viola"; 9. "Bird"; 10. "See You in Hell"; 11. "Afterglow"; 12. "Dim"	51	KOR: 1,721

=== Singles ===
==== As lead artist ====
List of singles as lead artist, showing year released, chart positions, and name of the album
Title	Year	Peak chart positions	Album
Title	Year	KOR Down.	Album
"New" (Note: credited to Loona, but the track is a solo by Yves)	2017	—	Yves
"Loop" (featuring Lil Cherry)	2024	161	Loop
"Tik Tok"	2024	—	I Did
"Viola"	2024	—	I Did
"Dim"	2025	—	I Did
"White Cat"	2025	—	Soft Error
"Soap" (featuring PinkPantheress)	2025	—	Soft Error
"Ex Machina"	2025	—	Soft Error: X
"Nail" (featuring Lolo Zouaï)	2026	—	Nail
"Hysteric"	2026	TBA	Cute and Anxiety
"Adam"	2026	TBA	Cute and Anxiety
"—" denotes a recording that did not chart or was not released in that territory.

==== As featured artist ====
List of singles as featured artist, showing year released, and name of the album
Title	Year	Album
"Falling for You" (Blah featuring Yves)	2025	Normal Life
"Do It" (Remix) (Underscores featuring Yves)	2026	Non-album single
"Pop Girl" (Yves Remix) (Lexie Liu featuring Yves)	2026	Non-album single

=== Soundtrack appearances ===
List of soundtrack appearances, showing year released, and name of the album
Title	Year	Album
"Breath" (한숨)	2024	Missing Crown Prince Original Soundtrack

=== Guest appearances ===
List of guest appearances, showing year released, artist, and name of the album
Title	Year	Artist	Album
"Stars + Yves"	2026	PinkPantheress	Fancy Some More?

=== Songwriting credits ===
All songwriting credits are adapted from the Korea Music Copyright Association's database, unless otherwise noted.

Title	Year	Artist	Album
"Playback"	2022	Loona	Flip That
"Strawberry Soda"	2023	Loossemble	Loossemble
"Truman Show"	2024	Loossemble	One Of A Kind
"Stars + Yves"	2025	PinkPantheress	Fancy Some More?
"Ex Machina"	2025	Yves	Soft Error: X
"It"	2026	Yves	Nail
"Halo"	2026	Yves	Nail
"Nail"	2026	Yves	Nail
"Birth"	2026	Yves	Nail
"Got It"	2026	Vayonn	Youth Today

== Videography ==
=== Music videos ===
Title	Year	Director(s)	Ref.
"Loop" (featuring Lil Cherry)	2024	Bang Jaeyeob	
"Viola"	2024	Eehosoo	
"White Cat"	2025	Jinseul	
"Soap" (featuring PinkPantheress)	2025	Unknown	
"Falling for You"	2025	Unknown	
"Do It (Yves Remix)" (by Underscores featuring Yves)	2026	Underscores, Gubo	
"Nail" (featuring Lolo Zouaï)	2026	Bang Jaeyeob	
"Break It" (featuring Lexie Liu)	2026	Jeremy Z. Qin	
"Pop Girl" (Yves Remix) (Lexie Liu featuring Yves)	2026	Jeremy Z. Qin	
"Hysteric"	2026	Awkpak (Aedia Studio)	

== Filmography ==
=== Television shows ===
Year	Title	Role	Ref.
2019	The Gashinas	Cast member	
2020	Fact iN Star	MC	

== Concerts and tours ==
Apple Cinnamon Crunch Tour (2024-2025)

Date	City	Country	Venue	Ref.
December 4, 2024	Berlin	Germany	Huxleys Neue Welt	
December 7, 2024	Warsaw	Poland	Palladium	
December 9, 2024	London	England	O2 Shepherd's Bush Empire	
December 12, 2024	Paris	France	Bataclan	
December 15, 2024	Rome	Italy	Orion Live Club	
January 16, 2025	Montreal	Canada	MTELUS	
January 19, 2025	Toronto	Canada	Danforth Music Hall	
January 21, 2025	Brooklyn	United States	Brooklyn Paramount	
January 23, 2025	Chicago	United States	Copernicus Center	
January 25, 2025	Dallas	United States	House of Blues	
January 27, 2025	Houston	United States	House of Blues	
January 30, 2025	Los Angeles	United States	Orpheum Theatre	
February 1, 2025	San Francisco	United States	Palace of Fine Arts	
February 4, 2025	Tacoma	United States	Pantages Theater	
April 1, 2025	Mexico City	Mexico	Foro Puebla	
April 3, 2025	Buenos Aires	Argentina	C Art Media	
April 6, 2025	Santiago	Chile	CEINA	
April 8, 2025	Lima	Peru	Centro de Convenciones Barranco	
April 11, 2025	São Paulo	Brazil	Vip Station	

Cosmic Crispy Tour (2025)

Date	City	Country	Venue	Ref.
August 17, 2025	Osaka	Japan	Matsushita IMP Hall	
August 18, 2025	Tokyo	Japan	Zepp Divercity	
August 24, 2025	Taipei	Taiwan	Westar	
August 27, 2025	Melbourne	Australia	170 Russell	
August 29, 2025	Sydney	Australia	Metro Theatre	
August 31, 2025	Brisbane	Australia	The Triffid	
September 2, 2025	Manila	Philippines	Samsung Hall - SM Aura	
September 4, 2025	Bangkok	Thailand	Ultra Arena Bravo BKK	

Yves Europe Tour (2026)

Date	City	Country	Venue	Ref.
April 16, 2026	Manchester	England	Manchester Academy	
April 19, 2026	Berlin	Germany	Columbia Theatre	
April 20, 2026	Amsterdam	Netherlands	Q Factory	
April 22, 2026	Paris	France	Bataclan	
April 25, 2026	Cologne	Germany	Carlswerk Victoria	
April 27, 2026	Munich	Germany	Backstage Werk	
April 28, 2026	Warsaw	Poland	Progresja	
May 1, 2026	Barcelona	Spain	Sala Apolo	
May 3, 2026	Madrid	Spain	Sala Wagon	

Yves Tour: The Americas (2026)

Date	City	Country	Venue	Ref.
May 5, 2026	Vancouver	Canada	Vogue Theatre	
May 8, 2026	Los Angeles	United States	Alex Theatre	
May 11, 2026	Seattle	United States	Showbox	
May 13, 2026	San Francisco	United States	Palace of Fine Arts	
May 15, 2026	Dallas	United States	The Bomb Factory	
May 17, 2026	Atlanta	United States	Center Stage	
May 20, 2026	New York	United States	Palladium Times Square	
May 23, 2026	Chicago	United States	Copernicus Center	
May 26, 2026	Toronto	Canada	Danforth Music Hall	
May 29, 2026	São Paulo	Brazil	VIP Station	
May 31, 2026	Montevideo	Uruguay	Montevideo Music Box	
June 2, 2026	Buenos Aires	Argentina	C Art Media	
June 4, 2026	Santiago	Chile	Teatro Coliseo	
June 7, 2026	Bogotá	Colombia	Teatro Astor Plaza	

== Awards and nominations ==
Name of the award ceremony, year presented, category, nominee of the award, and the result of the nomination
Award ceremony	Year	Category	Work	Result	Ref.
Korean Music Awards	2025	Best K-pop Album	I Did	Nominated	

=== Listicles ===
Name of publisher, year listed, name of listicle, and placement
Publisher	Year	Listicle	Recipient	Placement	Ref.
Billboard	2024	The 20 Best K-Pop Albums of 2024 (So Far): Staff Picks	Loop	18th	
Billboard	2024	The 25 Best K-Pop Albums of 2024: Staff Picks	I Did	8th	
Billboard	2026	The 25 Best K-Pop Albums of 2026 (So Far), Ranked: Staff Picks	Nail	8th	
NME	2024	The 25 best K-pop songs of 2024	"Loop"	12th	
NME	2025	The 25 best K-pop songs of 2025	"White Cat"	16th	
