= Chuu (single album) =

Single album by Loona
- Released: December 28, 2017
- Genre: Pop
- Length: 6:31
- Language: Korean
- Labels: Blockberry Creative; Vlending Co., Ltd.; Windmill ENT

Loona chronology
| Yves (2017) | Chuu (2017) | Go Won (2018) |

Chuu solo chronology
| Chuu (2017) | Howl (2023) |

Alternative artwork
- Yves & Chuu artwork

Music video
- "Heart Attack" on YouTube

Chuu (also known as Yves & Chuu) is the tenth single album from South Korean girl group Loona's pre-debut project. It was released on December 28, 2017, by Blockberry Creative. It officially introduces member Chuu and contains two tracks, Chuu's solo "Heart Attack" and "Girl's Talk", a duet with previously introduced member Yves.

== Media reception ==
Chuu's music video for her song "Heart Attack" released in 2017 gained praise by fans of K-pop for its depiction of a seemingly lesbian relationship between Chuu herself and fellow Loona member Yves which is a rare case in the K-pop industry, although there has been no affirmation of their sexuality or allyship by the company or the members themselves. However, other people have stated that Heart Attack rather than being a positive representation of LGBT love, used the depiction of homoerotic love as a way to garner more fan interest.

== Track listing ==
| No. | Title | Lyrics | Music | Arrangement | Length |
|---|---|---|---|---|---|
| 1. | "Heart Attack" (Chuu solo) | Park Ji-yeon (MonoTree) | Ollipop, Hayley Aitken | Ollipop, Hayley Aitken | 3:14 |
| 2. | "Girl's Talk" (Yves and Chuu duet) | G-High, Son Go-eun (MonoTree) | G-High, Son Go-eun (MonoTree) | G-High (MonoTree) | 3:17 |
| Total length: | | | | | 6:31 |

== Charts ==
| Chart | Peak position | Sales |
|---|---|---|
| South Korea Gaon Weekly Album Chart | 8 | 17,680 |
| South Korea Gaon Monthly Album Chart | 55 | 17,680 |
