= Lolo Zouaï =

French singer (born 1995)

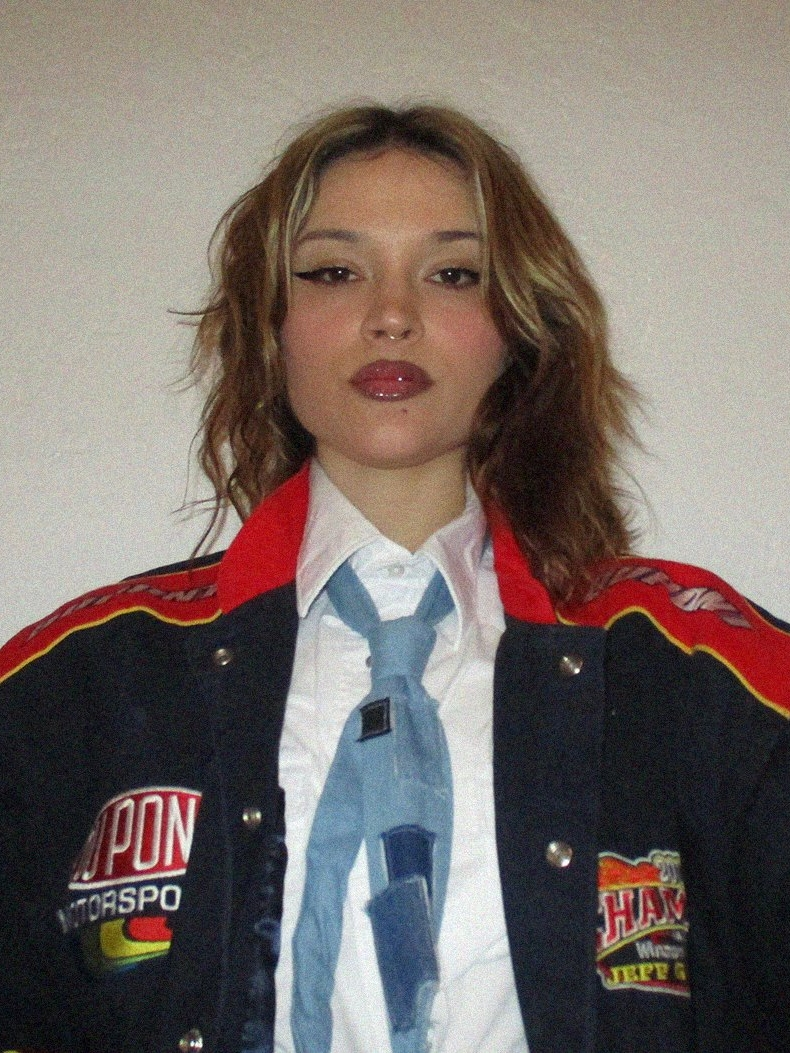
- Zouaï in 2022

Background information
- Born: Laureen Rebeha Zouaï; 5 March 1995 (age 31); Paris, France
- Origin: San Francisco, California, U.S.
- Genres: R&B; pop
- Occupation: Singer
- Instrument: Vocals
- Years active: 2016–present
- Labels: RCA Records; Keep it on the Lolo; Because Music
- Website: lolozouai.com

Laureen Rebeha Zouaï (/zuˈaɪ/ zoo-EYE; born 5 March 1995), known professionally as Lolo Zouaï, is a French singer. Her debut album High Highs to Low Lows was released in 2019.

== Early life ==
Laureen Rebeha Zouaï was born in Paris, France. Born to a French mother and an Algerian father, Zouaï moved to San Francisco, California when she was a child.

== Career ==
Zouaï released her debut album, High Highs to Low Lows, in 2019. The album was given a 7.5 out of 10 rating by Pitchfork. Zouaï was featured as "one to watch" by The Guardian in April 2019. She co-wrote "Still Down" from H.E.R.'s self-titled album, which won a Grammy Award for Best R&B Album.

After opening for the North American leg of Dua Lipa's Future Nostalgia Tour, Zouaï released her sophomore album Playgirl in October 2022. She announced the Playgirl world tour slated for 2023. In November 2022, Zouaï was included in the Forbes 30 Under 30 2023 list for musicians. In an interview at the 2023 Billboard Women in Music event, Lolo revealed that her contract with RCA Records had ended and she would continue as an independent artist.

Zouaï's third album, Reverie, was released on 24 April 2026.

== Music ==
Zouaï sings in both English and French. Her music moves between alternative R&B and French pop.

== Discography ==
=== Albums ===
- High Highs to Low Lows (2019)
- Playgirl (2022)
- Reverie (2026)

=== EPs ===
- Ocean Beach (2019)
- Beautiful Lies (2020)
- Crying in the Carwash (2023)
- Please Hold (2024)

=== Singles ===
- "So Real" (2016)
- "IDR" (2016)
- "High Highs to Low Lows" (2017)
- "Blue" (2018)
- "Brooklyn Love" (2018)
- "Desert Rose" (2018)
- "Challenge" (2018)
- "For the Crowd" (2018)
- "Ride" (2019)
- "It's My Fault" (2020)
- "Galipette" (2021)
- "Scooter" (2021)
- "Give Me a Kiss" (2022)
- "Blur" (2022)
- "pl4yg1rl" (2022)
- "Crazy Sexy Dream Girl" (2022)
- "Encore" (2023)
- "VVVIP" (2023)
- "Crying in the Carwash" (2023)
- "Unhhh" (2024)
- "Jetlag" (2024)
- "3AM in San Francisco" (2025)
- "Les Mots (feat. Dinos)" (2025)
- "Holding On" (2026)

==== As featured artist ====
- "Sak Pase" (Michaël Brun feat. Saint Levant & Lolo Zouaï) (2023)
- "Sticky" (Kito feat. Lolo Zouaï) (2023)
- "Makeup" (Slayyyter feat. Lolo Zouaï) (2023)
- "Mute" (Shygirl feat. Lolo Zouaï) (2024)
- "Nail" (Yves feat. Lolo Zouaï) (2026)

=== Songwriting credits ===
Title	Year	Artist	Album	Ref.
"Still Down"	2019	H.E.R.	H.E.R.	
"Wrong Things"	2021	Kirk Knight	After Dark	
"Issues"	2022	GoGo Morrow	Ready	
"Right Now"	2024	NewJeans	Supernatural	
"Nail" (featuring Lolo Zouaï)	2026	Yves	Nail	

== Tours ==
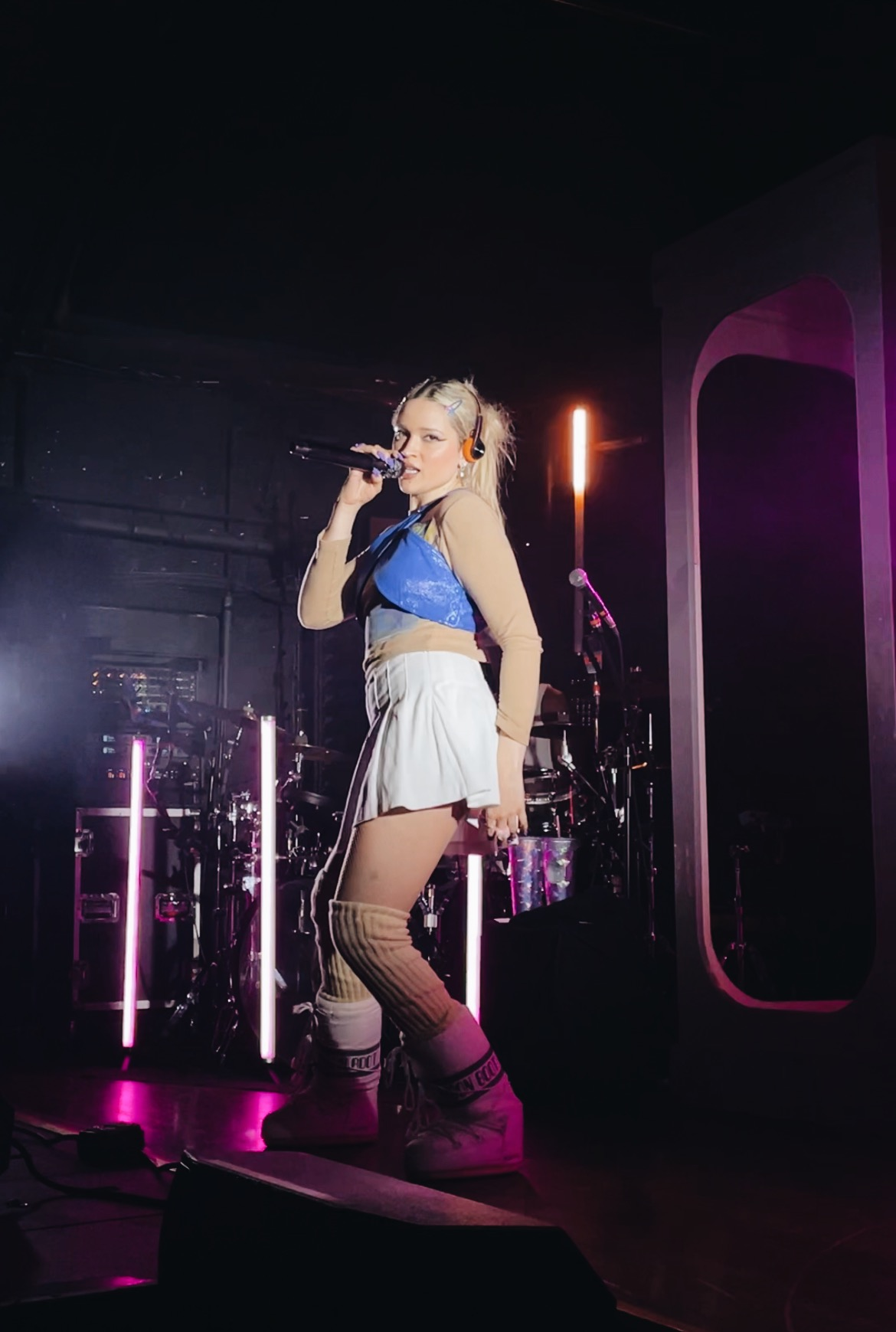
Lolo Zouaï performing at the Brighton Music Hall in April 2023

Headlining

- Lolo Zouaï Live in Concert (2018)
- High Highs to Low Lows Tour (2019)
- Playgirl World Tour (2023)

Supporting

- Alina Baraz – Alina Baraz: The Tour (2018)
- Dua Lipa – Future Nostalgia Tour (2022)
- The Marías – The Marías: Cinema (2022)
- Slayyyter - Club Valentine Tour (2023)
