= Princess Pring =

South Korean television series

- Also known as: Princess Pring; Princess Pring in the Birthday Kingdom; Celebrina in Birthday Wishland
- Hangul: 생일왕국의 프린세스 프링
- RR: Saengil wanggugui peurinseseu Peuring
- MR: Saengil wanggugŭi p'ŭrinsesŭ P'ŭring
- Genre: Musical; Comedy; Fantasy; Magical girl
- Written by: Kim Soo Yeon; Gang Na-lu; Jang Hye-lin
- Directed by: Kim Soo Yeon
- Country of origin: South Korea
- Original language: Korean
- No. of seasons: 2
- No. of episodes: 26 (Season 1), 13 (Season 2)

Production
- Producers: Yang Hyeon-jin; Kang Ji-min
- Running time: 12 minutes
- Production company: Loco Entertainment

Original release
- Network: KBS1
- Release: December 19, 2015 – July 16, 2016

Princess Pring (Korean: 프린세스 프링; also known as Princess Pring in the Birthday Kingdom) is a Korean media franchise created in 2012 by Korean toy company Loco Entertainment. The franchise features the titular character Princess Pring, a cheerful rabbit girl who cheers up children during their birthdays, sometimes helping them with their problems in the most fun of ways.

A musical fantasy animated series based on the franchise is produced by the company and aired on KBS1 from December 19, 2015, to July 16, 2016. A second season was announced in 2017.

== History ==
The franchise was created by Loco Entertainment in 2012 with funding from the Korea Creative Content Agency as part of both the "New Character Business Support" and "Character Life Project" for a variety of character goods such as toys, plush toys, publishing and cutlery. It also received praise in the Seoul Character Licensing Fair in 2013 and 2014. On December 31, 2014, KBS Kids aired a special based on the series and, in May 2015, investments from KTH were made for funding a full series. The series was later made and broadcast on KBS1 from December 19, 2015, to July 16, 2016. The animated series, which is animated purely in CGI, is in the style of a musical adventure, with songs composed by Hwang Gun-dan of ButterFly music studios, with the music played by a real orchestra. Producer Yang Hyeon-jin has explained that both music and animation synergize together in the series to reflect the tone of each scene.

Animax Korea also aired the series in South Korea in 2016. The series's second season was officially announced, and released in 2018.

A planned English adaptation of the series by Lacey Entertainment was announced in 2017 under the title Celebrina in Birthday Wishland, with a planned global release in 2019; however, this adaption was ultimately never aired in any region.

== Plot ==
The Birthday Kingdom is a special place where children are invited to during their birthday to celebrate, greeted by the kingdom's Crown Princess, Princess Pring. She herself listens to the children's wishes with her big ears and usually helps them in fun ways possible, whenever they feel sad or lonely. But she is not alone in the Birthday Kingdom, as such she was assisted by her friends to help the children to support their dreams and their future. Pring makes sure that everything is "Everyday Birthday!".
