= Loonatheworld Tour =

2022 concert tour by Loona

- Tour by Loona
- Start date: August 1, 2022
- End date: March 3, 2023
- Legs: 3
- No. of shows: 14 in North America; 5 in Europe; 3 in Asia; 22 in total

Loona concert chronology
- Loonaverse: From; Loonatheworld Tour (2022-2023)

Loonatheworld Tour, also known as 2022 LOONA 1st World Tour : [LOONATHEWORLD], was the first worldwide concert tour by the South Korean girl group Loona. This marked the group's first-ever world tour and concerts outside of Seoul since their debut in 2018. The tour began in Los Angeles on August 1, 2022.

== Background ==
On May 31, 2022, Blockberry Creative announced Loona's first tour in the United States. (The original announcement only had 9 shows compared to the now 14 shows.) On June 3, it was announced a second date was added to the Los Angeles show. The following day, tickets went on sale for the 10 dates and Blockberry Creative and MyMusicTaste announced that member Chuu would be unable to participate in the world tour due to pre-scheduled activities. On June 15, four more locations were added and tickets would go on sale the next day. On July 27, the European leg of the tour was unveiled. It was announced that Choerry will not be participating in the European leg of the tour due to health issues. The tour started in Warsaw on September 6 and continue to Amsterdam, Frankfurt, Paris, before concluding in London. On September 17, two concerts were added for Seoul on October 15–16. BlockBerry Creative announced that Chuu will be sitting out on the Seoul dates due to scheduling conflicts.

== Setlist ==
1. "#"
2. "So What"
3. "Heat"
4. "Star"
5. "Butterfly"
6. "One Way"
7. "You and Me Together"
8. "My Melody"
9. "Loonatic"
10. "Stylish"
11. "Dance On My Own"
12. "Pale Blue Dot"
13. "Flip That"
14. "Wow"
15. "Pose"
16. "Why Not?"
17. "PTT (Paint the Town)"

Encore

1. "Hi High"
2. "Day & Night" †
3. "Oh (Yes I Am)" †

† Only featured on Kansas City, London and Reading's setlist.

† Only featured on Washington's setlist.

Set list in Seoul
1. "Hi High"
2. "Heat (열기) "
3. "Star"
4. "Satellite (위성)"
5. "Butterfly"
6. "Vivid" (HeeJin)^{[a]} / “Kiss Later (키스는 다음에)" (YeoJin) ^{[b]}
7. "Everyday I Love You" (ViVi feat. HaSeul)^{[a]} / "One&Only" (Go Won)^{[b]}
8. "Around You (다녀가요)" (HyunJin)^{[a]} / "Let Me In (소년, 소녀)" (HaSeul)^{[b]}
9. "Eclipse" (Kim Lip)^{[a]} / "D-1" (Yves)^{[b]}
10. "Egoist" (Olivia Hye feat. JinSoul)^{[a]} / "Singing In The Rain" (JinSoul)^{[b]}
11. "Fall Again"
12. "Need U"
13. "Pale Blue Dot"
14. "Flip That"
15. "Pose"
16. "Day&Night"
17. "WOW"
18. "PTT"
19. "Universe"
20. "Playback"

Notes

- ^{^[a]}Day 1
- ^{^[b]}Day 2

== Tour dates ==
Date	City	Country	Venue	Attendance
North America
August 1, 2022	Los Angeles	United States	The Wiltern	4,500
August 2, 2022	Los Angeles	United States	The Wiltern	4,500
August 4, 2022	San Francisco	United States	The Midway	—
August 6, 2022	Denver	United States	Filmore Auditorium	3,600
August 8, 2022	Kansas City	United States	Uptown Theater	—
August 11, 2022	Chicago	United States	Radius Chicago	—
August 13, 2022	Louisville	United States	Old Forester's Town Hall	—
August 15, 2022	Reading	United States	Santander Arena	5,000
August 17, 2022	Washington, D.C	United States	MGM National Harbor	—
August 19, 2022	New York	United States	Palladium Times Square	—
August 23, 2022	Atlanta	United States	Coca-Cola Roxy	—
August 25, 2022	Dallas	United States	Music Hall at Fair Park	—
August 26, 2022	Houston	United States	713 Music Hall	—
August 28, 2022	Mexico City	Mexico	Pepsi Center	4,200
Europe
September 6, 2022	Warsaw	Poland	Arena COS Towar	—
September 8, 2022	Amsterdam	Netherlands	AFAS Live	—
September 11, 2022	Frankfurt	Germany	Jahrhunderthalle	—
September 13, 2022	Paris	France	Le Zenith	4,000
September 16, 2022	London	United Kingdom	O2 Academy Brixton	—
Asia
October 15, 2022	Seoul	South Korea	SK Olympic Handball Gymnasium	—
October 16, 2022	Seoul	South Korea	SK Olympic Handball Gymnasium	—
March 3, 2023	Tokyo	Japan	Tokyo Garden Theatre	—
Total				N/A
