= Flip That =

- Digital and Version B cover (Note: Four different physical copies with alternate covers were sold titled Version A, B, C and D.)

EP by Loona
- Released: June 20, 2022
- Genre: K-pop
- Length: 17:09
- Language: Korean
- Labels: Blockberry Creative; Warner Music Korea
- Producers: Lee Su-bin; Sure Kim; Jjha; Choi Young-ah; Pink Slip; Inverness; MZMC; Bullseye; Monkeybags; Boran; Gloryface; Jinli; Harry

Loona chronology
[&] (2021)	Flip That (2022)

Singles from Flip That
- 1. "Flip That" Released: June 20, 2022

Flip That (Note: Alternatively titled Summer Special [Flip That].) (sometimes stylized as FL!P that) is the fifth extended play by South Korean girl group Loona. It was released on June 20, 2022, through Blockberry Creative and Warner Music Korea. The EP features a total of six songs and is Loona's first project since [#] to not feature a full English song. This was their final release under Blockberry Creative.

== Background ==
Loona released their fourth extended play, [&], in June 2021. The genre diverse project received generally positive reviews from music critics and became the group's best selling album. In September of the same year, Loona released their debut double A-side Japanese single, "Hula Hoop" / "Star Seed" that became a top ten hit in the country. On February 21, 2022, Mnet announced that Loona would participate in Queendom 2. On June 2, Loona finished as runner-up in the live finale of the show despite not performing in the first round due to some members testing positive for COVID-19.

== Promotion ==
On June 3, 2022, Loona released a cryptic trailer titled "The Journey", which features lush flowers and grass growing on an empty, pastel-colored train carriage and a garden with a mysterious door. The clip ends with a mysterious release date of June 20. The next day Loona announced the release of their fifth extended play Flip That. The group shared the news alongside a teaser image that features the group members holding hands while standing by a tree with purple flowers. The EP was released before the start of the group's first-ever world tour that is set to begin on August 1 in Los Angeles.

Promotional pictures for the EP featuring the group members were released starting from June 5–15. The track listing was released on June 8 and featured two already performed songs by the group. Loona performed the song "Pose" on the last round of Queendom 2 and during their concert Loonaverse: From they performed the track "Playback", which is the first song written by the members to appear on an album. Alongside the tracklist the first teaser for the music video "Flip That" was released. The EP's highlight melody was released on June 16 featuring snippets of all the songs featured on the project. On June 18, 2022, the second teaser for the music video for "Flip That" was released.

=== Live performances ===
Prior to the release of the EP, the group held a live showcase on the same date to introduce the extended play and communicate with their fans, where they performed the title track along with "Pale Blue Dot".

== Critical reception ==
Professional ratings
Review scores
Source	Rating
NME	4/5 stars

Rhian Daly from NME gave the extended play four out of five stars, calling the project "an understated but subtly addictive return". He called the EP "a much-needed gift from the group, but it's not one that does much to turn up the volume" but instead "ditches the girl crush sound of recent [singles], and returns to Loona's dreamier, more ethereal side". He called it a "refreshing move, albeit one that means some of the songs present on the project need a little more attention before they get under your skin".

== Track listing ==
Flip That track listing
No.	Title	Lyrics	Music	Arrangement	Length
1.	"The Journey"		Sure Kim (Chansline); Lee Su-bin (Chansline); Linemaster	Lee Su-bin; Sure Kim	1:14
2.	"Flip That"	Sure Kim; Lee Su-bin; Eliana Klef	Sure Kim; Lee Su-bin; Linemaster	Lee Su-bin; Sure Kim	2:57
3.	"Need U"	Jjha (Chansline); Sure Kim; Choi Young-ah (Chansline)	Jjha; Sure Kim; Choi Young-ah; Linemaster	Jjha; Sure Kim; Choi Young-ah	2:56
4.	"Pose"	Amelia Moore; JBach; Landon Sears; MZMC; Lee Shi-dae (MUMW); Y0ung; Vacation (MUMW)	Amelia Moore; JBach; Landon Sears; MZMC	Pink Slip; Inverness; MZMC	3:06
5.	"Pale Blue Dot"	Bullseye (AVEC); Boran; Monkeybags (AVEC)	Bullseye; Monkeybags; Boran	Bullseye; Monkeybags; Boran	3:25
6.	"Playback"	Jinli (Full8loom); Kim Lip; Yves; HaSeul	Gloryface (Full8loom); Jinli; Harry (Full8loom)	Gloryface; Jinli; Harry	3:31
Total length:					17:09

== Charts ==
=== Weekly charts ===
Chart performance for Flip That
Chart (2022)	Peak position
Croatian Albums (HDU)	10
Finnish Physical Albums (Suomen virallinen lista)	6
South Korean Albums (Gaon)	4

=== Monthly charts ===
Monthly chart performance for Flip That
Chart (2022)	Peak position
South Korean Albums (Circle)	7

=== Year-end charts ===
Year-end chart performance for Flip That
Chart (2022)	Position
South Korean Albums (Circle)	94

== Release history ==
Release history for Flip That
Region	Date	Format	Label
South Korea	June 20, 2022	Digital download; streaming; CD	Blockberry Creative; Warner Music Korea
Various	June 20, 2022	Digital download; streaming	Blockberry Creative; Warner Music Group
