= Flip That (song) =

Single by Loona

from the EP Flip That
- Language: Korean
- Released: June 20, 2022
- Genre: Tropical house; synth-pop
- Length: 2:57
- Label: Blockberry Creative; Warner
- Composers: Sure; Lee Soo-bin (Chansline); Linemaster
- Lyricists: Sure; Lee Soo-bin (Chansline); Han Hee-jun

Loona singles chronology
"Hula Hoop" / "Star Seed" (2021)	"Flip That" (2022)	"Luminous" (2022)

Music video
- "Flip That" on YouTube

"Flip That" is a song recorded by South Korean girl group Loona for their fifth extended play (EP) of the same name. It was released as the EP's lead single by Blockberry Creative on June 20, 2022.

== Background and release ==
On June 3, 2022, Blockberry Creative announced Loona would be releasing their fifth extended play titled Flip That on June 20. On June 8, the track listing for Flip That was released with "Flip That" announced as the lead single. A day later, the first music video teaser was released. On June 17, the highlight medley video teaser for Flip That was released. Two days later, the second music video teaser was released. The song was released as part of Flip That alongside the music video.

== Composition ==
"Flip That" was written, composed, arranged by Sure, and Lee Soo-bin (Chansline) alongside Han Hee-jun for the lyrics, and Linemaster for the composition. The song was described as a tropical house and synth-pop song with "constantly changing rhythm and composition" with lyrics about "[Loona]'s bold ambition to turn the world upside down". "Flip That" was composed in the key of B minor, with a tempo of 112 beats per minute.

== Critical reception ==
Rhian Dhaly of NME called the song "perfect for that balmy summer nights due to its soft and lowkey energy but felt the song was a bit muted to make a strong immediate impression". Gladys Yeo of NME called the song the 13th best in the group's discography saying that "returning to their more optimistic, light-hearted pop sound, 'Flip That' approaches the group's core message with a far gentler touch than more recent title tracks". In addition, she called the song "an addictive summer bop that is sure to a bring a smile to your face even on the worst days".

== Music video ==
The music video was described as a "bright production" featuring "the group travelling to magical garden and forest settings" with "direct references to past releases from the group, [such as] the 2017's "The Carol 2.0", 2018's "Hi High", as well as a clock hitting 12 by the video's end, potentially referencing the group's 2020 EP [12:00]".

== Commercial performance ==
"Flip That" debuted at number 93 on South Korea's Gaon Digital Chart in the chart issue dated June 19–25, 2022.

== Promotion ==
Prior to the release of Flip That, Loona held a live showcase on the same date to introduce the extended play and communicate with their fans, where they performed "Flip That" along with "Pale Blue Dot". They subsequently performed on four music programs: Mnet's M Countdown on June 23, KBS's Music Bank on June 24, MBC's Show! Music Core on June 25, and SBS's Inkigayo on June 26. On the second week, they performed three music programs: SBS M's The Show on June 28, MBC M's Show Champion on June 29, M Countdown on June 30, Music Bank on July 1, and Inkigayo on July 3, where they won first place for appearances on The Show and Show Champion.

== Charts ==
Chart performance for "Flip That"
Chart (2022)	Peak position
South Korea (Gaon)	93

== Accolades ==
Music program awards for "Flip That"
Program	Date	Ref.
Show Champion	June 29, 2022	
The Show	June 28, 2022	

== Release history ==
Release history for "Flip That"
Region	Date	Format	Label
Various	June 20, 2022	Digital download; streaming	Blockberry Creative; Warner

== See also ==
- List of The Show Chart winners (2022)
- List of Show Champion Chart winners (2022)
