= (&) =

[&]
- Digital and Version A cover (Note: Four different physical copies with alternate covers were sold titled Version A, B, C and D.)

EP by Loona
- Released: June 28, 2021
- Genres: Power pop; dance-pop; indie R&B; jazz
- Length: 20:16
- Languages: Korean; English
- Labels: Blockberry Creative; Universal Music Japan
- Producers: Ryan S. Jhun; Sabzevari; Kordnejad; Alawn; Alysa; Karlstrom; Schulz; Lee Gwan-hyoung; Han Yeon-ji; Jang Ju-na; Park Shin-ae; Choi Young-ah

Loona chronology
[12:00] (2020)	[&] (2021)	Flip That (2022)

Singles from [&]
- 1. "PTT (Paint the Town)" Released: June 28, 2021

[&] (read as "and") is the fourth extended play by South Korean girl group Loona. It was released on June 28, 2021, by Blockberry Creative and distributed by Kakao Entertainment. The comeback marked the return of member HaSeul, who had been on hiatus due to health issues since early 2020.

Upon release, [&] became the group's fastest and best selling project. All of its tracks appeared on the Gaon Download Chart becoming their first album to do so and also earned the group their first ever entry on the Gaon Digital Chart with the lead single, "PTT (Paint the Town)". The project was met with generally positive reviews with critics praising its genre diversity and the group's experimentation with different sounds on the project.

== Background ==
On June 1, 2021, at midnight Korean Standard Time, Loona announced through social media that they will be releasing a new extended play titled [&] on June 28. They also shared a cryptic teaser image containing the Latin words "citius, altius, fortius. Acta est fabula, plaudite" which translates to "faster, higher, stronger. The play is over, applaud". The following day a teaser image titled "XII" was released featuring twelve eyes, confirming the return of member HaSeul, who did not take part in the group's last two promotional cycles to focus on her mental health. HaSeul also opened up about doing group activities again saying:

"Because it has been two years since I participated in a comeback, I prepared a lot for this one. I was really nervous preparing for this comeback, but my members helped me fill in where I was lacking. So I think that people will really be able to see our synergy as a group of 12."

Individual member teaser pictures were released from June 3 to June 21 and a highlight medley video for the extended play was released on the group's YouTube channel on June 25. The track list for the album was revealed on June 10 and "PTT (Paint the Town)" was announced as the title track. Four different concept photos were also released for the extended play. The first trailer video titled "&" for the extended play was released on June 23 and it features member Kim Lip walking into a huge temple, overlapping with the scene for the video for her solo song "Eclipse". Then, a drum plays in the intense red lighting, heralding that the beginning of a huge worldview has risen, and Kim Lip, wearing a red school uniform connected to her solo and unit worldviews, stands on the altar located in the center of the temple. Two other trailer videos titled "&2" and "&3" were also released.

== Composition ==
[&] features different sound that navigate from Bollywood-esque details, Korean ballad fairytale-like chimes and strings, quirky jazz, radio friendly power pop and dance-pop songs and ballads, and even the minimalistic traits of Korean indie R&B trends and rough lo-fi sounds. The extended play has been described as genre-diverse.

=== Songs ===
The intro song "&" gets the EP off to a dark, mysterious start, with its strong, thumping drum beats and hypnotic flute music leading into "PTT (Paint the Town)" which is a dance-pop and hip hop song that contains the most intense and "explosive" production among the songs that the group has released thus far. The song incorporates elements of Bollywood music, with Indian percussion and tabla combined with dubstep and 808 bass sounds, and an Indian flute playing the signature melody of the song. "PTT (Paint the Town)" depicts the group members' new worldview, as they reestablish themselves independently without being trapped in taboos or being wary of others to "paint the town" in the group's colors.

"Wow" is a groovy jazz styled and broadway inspired song with bouncing tempo, a refreshing up-tempo melody and an upbeat chorus. "Be Honest" is an electropop song with fresh cord variations and sound effects and has an old school throwback sound. Member HyeJu (formerly Olivia Hye) compared the song to their 2018 single "Hi High" saying the song has a bright and fresh concept and a really refreshing vibe, which makes it a good song to listen to in the summer. "Dance On My Own" is the group's second full song in English following their 2020 single "Star", which was featured on the group's third extended play [12:00] in 2020. It is a chill midtempo power pop song about dancing alone and feeling yourself. "A Different Night" is a deep ballad featuring a dreamy and faint sound. The last track "U R" is an indie R&B and lo-fi song with an emotional piano and electric guitar.

== Promotion ==
To celebrate the release of the new extended play, the group hosted two online events, "Premier Greeting [D&D]", a fanmeet held on June 27, and an online concert, "ON WAVE [LOONATHEWORLD: &]", which took place on June 28. The group performed at different music programs such as Mnet's M Countdown, KBS' Music Bank and MBC's Show! Music Core to promote the album. On July 9 one of the group's staff member tested positive for COVID-19. The group was tested for the virus through PCR testing and although all of the members results come out negative Blockberry announced that all promotional activities for the album were temporarily suspended and that the members will all go into self-quarantine starting from July 10 in order to prevent the spread of the virus and for the health and safety of the members. On July 20, Loona and all their staff members were all retested for COVID-19 through PCR testing and everyone tested negative. The group resumed their promotional activities on July 22.

=== Singles ===
"PTT (Paint the Town)" was released as the lead single from the extended play and the accompanying music video for the song was released the same day. Blockberry Creative partnered with Universal Music Japan for the first time to promote the album and the group's activities in Japan; an official Japanese page for the group was also created. A Japanese version of the title track was also released alongside the original Korean version, making it the group's first ever Japanese language song.

== Critical reception ==
Professional ratings
Review scores
Source	Rating
IZM	3/5 stars
NME	3/5 stars

Verónica A. Bastardo of The Quietus gave the extended play a very positive review calling all tracks on the album enjoyable. She called the group's sound an unexpected trip in each new music project and called their journey through sound just the beginning. She ended her review by saying: "Loona came back with an album that hits just right when you want to cement yourself as a pop reference in a worldwide music audience".

Ruby C from NME gave extended play three out of five stars, saying that the overall direction Loona take on the extended play points out that the group is unafraid to experiment with music, even if it doesn't always work out. She remarked that this inclination to look beyond the routine will, undoubtedly, continue to set the girl group apart in the years to come.

== Awards and nominations ==
The EP was nominated for Album Bonsang at the 36th Golden Disc Awards becoming the group's first ever album to be nominated in the category.

Awards and nominations for [&]
Ceremony	Year	Award	Result	Ref.
Golden Disc Awards	2022	Album Bonsang	Nominated	

== Commercial performance ==
The EP debuted at number 4 on the South Korean Gaon Album Chart becoming the group's fifth consecutive top five album. The album sold 97,300 copies in its first two days of availability debuting at number 11 on the Gaon Monthly Albums Chart with only two days of tracking and becoming their fastest selling project. The album sold 24,600 more copies in July placing at number 16 on the Gaon Monthly Albums Chart for July and becoming the group's best selling album.

The EP debuted at number 48 on the Billboard Japan Download Albums chart becoming the group's first ever entry on an official Japanese chart. The following week the album debuted at number 46 on the main Japanese Oricon Albums Chart becoming the group's first ever entry.

In the UK, the EP debuted at number 21 on the Official Album Downloads Chart for the week ending July 8, 2021 becoming the group's third consecutive top thirty entry on the chart. In the US, the EP debuted at number 14 on the US Billboard World Album, number 24 on the US Billboard Heatseekers Albums and number 59 on the Billboard Independent Albums chart. On the week ending July 22 the album debuted at number 49 on the Polish Albums Chart becoming the group's first ever charting album in the territory.

== Track listing ==
[&] track listing
No.	Title	Lyrics	Music	Arrangement	Length
1.	"&"		Ryan S. Jhun; Hanif Hitmanic Sabzevari; Dennis DeKo Kordnejad	Jhun; Sabzevari; Kordnejad	1:19
2.	"PTT (Paint the Town)"	Jhun; Sabzevari; Kordnejad; YOUHA	Jhun; Sabzevari; Kordnejad; YOUHA	Jhun; Sabzevari; Kordnejad	3:21
3.	"WOW"	YOUHA	ALYSA; Anna Timgren; Harold Phillippon; Jhun	Alawn; ALYSA; Jhun	2:58
4.	"Be Honest"	Jo Yoon-kyung	Christian Karlstrom; Cazzi Opeia; Ellen Berg	Karlstrom; Jhun; Kordenejad	3:16
5.	"Dance On My Own"	Gino Barletta; Melanie Joy Fontana; Michel Schutz; Nolan W. Sipe	Schulz	Schulz	2:37
6.	"A Different Night"	Yoon Hee-won (Chansline); Han Yeon-ji (Chansline)	Yoon Hee-won (Chansline); Lee Gwan-hyoung (Chansline); Han Yeon-ji (Chansline); Hwang Chan-hee (Chansline)	Lee Gwan-hyoung (Chansline); Han Yeon-ji (Chansline)	3:38
7.	"U R"	Jang Ju-na (Chansline); Park Shin-ae (Chansline); Choi Young-ah (Chansline)	Jang Ju-na (Chansline); Park Shin-ae (Chansline); Choi Young-ah (Chansline); Hwang Chan-hee (Chansline)	Jang Ju-na (Chansline); Park Shin-ae (Chansline); Choi Young-ah (Chansline)	3:04
Total length:					20:16

== Charts ==
=== Weekly charts ===
Weekly chart performance for [&]
Chart (2021)	Peak position
Japanese Albums (Oricon)	46
Japan Download Albums (Billboard Japan)	48
Polish Albums (ZPAV)	49
South Korean Albums (Gaon)	4
UK Digital Albums (OCC)	21
US Heatseekers Albums (Billboard)	24
US Independent Albums (Billboard)	59
US World Albums (Billboard)	14

=== Monthly charts ===
Monthly chart performance for [&]
Chart (2021)	Peak position
South Korean Albums (Gaon)	11

=== Year-end charts ===
Year-end chart performance for [&]
Chart (2021)	Position
South Korean Albums (Gaon)	82

== Sales ==
Sales for [&]
Region	Sales
Japan (Oricon)	648
South Korea (Gaon)	132,193

== Release history ==
Release history for [&]
Region	Date	Format	Label
South Korea	June 28, 2021	Digital download; streaming; CD	Blockberry Creative; Kakao Entertainment
Japan	June 28, 2021	Digital download; streaming; CD	Blockberry Creative; Universal Music Japan
Various	June 28, 2021	Digital download; streaming	Blockberry Creative; Warner Music Group
