= Hula Hoop (Loona song) =

2021 single by Loona

- Physical Limited B cover

Single by Loona
- Language: Japanese
- B-side: "Star Seed"
- Released: September 15, 2021
- Genre: Pop
- Length: 3:19
- Label: Blockberry Creative; Mercury Tokyo; Universal Music Japan
- Songwriters: Akira; Anna Timgren; Ryan S. Jhun
- Producer: Ryan S. Jhun

Loona singles chronology
| "PTT (Paint the Town)" (2021) | "Hula Hoop" / "Star Seed" (2021) | "Flip That" (2022) |

Music video
- "Hula Hoop" on YouTube

"Hula Hoop" is the debut Japanese single by the South Korean girl group Loona. It was released on September 15, 2021, through Blockberry Creative, Mercury Tokyo and Universal Music Japan. It was released alongside the group's song "Star Seed" (カクセイ, Kakusei) as a double A-side single. A city pop version of the song was released the same day. NME called the song a quirky and synth filled high-octane, unapologetic pop banger.

== Background ==
In June 2021 Blockberry Creative partnered with Universal Music Japan to promote Loona's activities in Japan; an official Japanese page for the group was also created. In the same month the company announced that the group will be having their official Japanese debut in September. On August 27, it was announced that Loona will release the double A-side single, "Hula Hoop / StarSeed" on September 15, with a physical CD release on October 20. The song is written by Akira and is composed by Ryan S. Jhun who previously worked with the group on their fourth extended play [&]. "Star Seed" was written by Sumire Yoshida (Suu) of Silent Siren and composed by Naoki Kubo.

== Promotion and release ==
Three different versions of CDs will be available on October 20 titled "Regular" and two limited-edition CDs titled "Version A" and "Version B". The DVD attached to the first limited-edition A of the CD will contain the making video of the "Star Seed" music video, and the DVD of the first limited-edition B will contain "LOONA Channel Vol. 1". In addition, it has been decided that the serial number will be included as a common application lottery privilege for the first limited edition and the first press of the regular edition. Fans use this serial number to apply for a Meet & Greet, autographed Polaroid photo, and clear file gift campaign where you can meet all group online. In addition, a solo jacket version of each member will be released exclusively for Universal Music Store. This edition will include a serial code that will allow fan to apply for online events that are different from the first limited edition and regular edition.

An online talk event was announced for September 14 where members talked about the new song and a part of the song will be revealed for the first time prior to its official release. The first promotional picture for the song featuring the members in bright and colour costumes was released on September 7.

== Track listing ==
- CD, digital download & streaming
1. "Hula Hoop" – 3:19
2. "Star Seed" (カクセイ) – 3:01
3. "PTT (Paint the Town)" (Japanese version) – 3:22
4. "Hula Hoop" (City Pop Version) – 3:14
- DVD (limited A)
1. "Star Seed" (music video)
2. "Hula Hoop" (making)
- DVD (limited B)
1. "Loona Channel Vol.1"

== Charts ==
Chart performance for "Hula Hoop"
| Chart (2021) | Peak position |
|---|---|
| Japan (Oricon) | 6 |
| Japan (Japan Hot 100) | 38 |
| Japan (Top Single Sales) | 3 |

== Release history ==
Release history and formats for "Hula Hoop"
| Region | Date | Format | Distributor |
|---|---|---|---|
| Various | September 15, 2021 | Digital download; streaming | Blockberry Creative; Mercury Tokyo; Universal Music Japan |
| Japan | October 20, 2021 | CD | Blockberry Creative; Mercury Tokyo; Universal Music Japan |
