= PTT (Paint the Town) =

2021 single by Loona

- Japanese version cover

Single by Loona

from the EP [&]
- Language: Korean; Japanese
- Released: June 28, 2021
- Genre: Dance; hip hop; EDM
- Length: 3:21
- Label: Blockberry Creative; Universal Music Japan
- Songwriters: Jhun; Sabzevari; Kordnejad; Youha
- Producers: Jhun; Sabzevari; Kordnejad

Loona singles chronology
"Star" (2020)	"PTT (Paint the Town)" (2021)	"Hula Hoop" / "Star Seed" (2021)

Music video
- "PTT (Paint the Town)" on YouTube

"PTT (Paint the Town)" is a song by the South Korean girl group Loona, released on June 28, 2021, as the lead single from their fourth extended play [&], through Blockberry Creative and Universal Music Japan. Written by Ryan S. Jhun, Sabzevari, Kordnejad and Youha, "PTT (Paint the Town)" is a Bollywood-inspired dance-pop and hip hop track with strong fast-paced percussion, sampled exotic vocals, aggressive dubstep sound and 808 bass.

== Background ==
On June 1, Blockberry Creative announced Loona will be having a comeback in the same month with their fourth EP [&]. On June 10, the album track listing was released and "PTT (Paint the Town)" was announced as the album's lead single. Member Jinsoul revealed that the song was inspired by Bollywood music. On June 27, Blockberry made public its partnership with Universal Music Japan and announced that a Japanese version of the song will be released to promote it in Japan.

== Composition and lyrics ==
"PTT (Paint the Town)" is a bollywood-inspired dance, hip hop and EDM song described as containing the most "intense" and "explosive" production among the songs that the group has released. The song opens with fast-paced percussion and sampled exotic vocals. In the midst of strong percussion and male vocals, an aggressive dubstep sound and 808 bass are added. Following that, a hypnotic Indian flute and a huge chorus are combined to create a splendid and majestic Bollywood feel. The song is composed in the key of A-flat major and has a tempo of 124 beats per minute.

Lyrically, the song conveys the aspiration to "paint the town" with one's own colors by independently establishing themself without being trapped in taboos or paying attention to others. In the beginning, it awakens the sleeping subjectivity by saying, "Our mission that has begun / Here, no one can stop me." It depicts the members' new worldview, and it contains the aspirations of "Paint The Town" as their own colors by independently establishing and re-establishing themselves. The members called the song a continuation of their two previous singles "So What" (2020) and "Why Not?" (2020) saying that "Why Not?" is about waiting for someone, while "Paint the Town" symbolizes the period of not needing to wait for this person anymore.

== Critical reception ==
"PTT (Paint the Town)" received mixed reviews from music critics. NME's Ruby C called the song underwhelming saying that it pales in comparison to the group's previous singles but welcomed the South Asian influence on the song. She remarked how the song is not the group's "most intense and explosive" as stated by their label, calling it notably tamer than their 2020 single "So What". IZM's Kim Seong-yeop said that the song's genre characteristics blurs the group personality but called it an overall enjoyable listen. He compared the song to the works of (G)I-dle, Everglow, and Blackpink and remarked how the sound of the song is very different from the sound the group started with saying that the members are trying to find a group color through various attempts rather than a process of ambiguity of identity.

NME ranked the song number 23 in a list of best songs by the groups. The reviewer commented how "som much is happening in the best way possible". They called the song a unique South Asian spin unlike anything else in the K-pop industry.

== Commercial performance ==
The song debuted at number nine on the US World Digital Song Sales chart becoming the group's sixth top ten hit and their first entry on the chart in over a year since "So What", before ascended to number six in April 2022. The song debuted at number 134 on the Gaon Digital Chart becoming their first ever entry on the main South Korean singles chart.

After the group's performance of the song on Queendom 2 the song re-entered the US World Digital Song Sales chart at a new peak of number six.

== Music video ==
The music video for "PTT (Paint the Town)" was directed by Digipedi. The video features the group members in a space reminiscent of a temple. A person is seen holding a spear in the background in a field where the sun sets. The group members also perform choreography against elegant backdrops. In the video member Hyunjin is seen donning an exotic look that features a unique headpiece that share a resemblance with traditional South Asian jewellery - the maang tikka and matha patti. These pieces of jewellery traditionally hold a significant value for Indian people. Reactions by netizens were mixed. While some called it offensive, others took a stand for the members and said that their 'inspired' looks should be considered cultural appreciation rather than cultural appropriation.

== Accolades ==
Loona took their first win for the song on July 6, on The Show against Brave Girls' "Chi Mat Ba Ram" and Drippin's "Free Pass".

Music program awards
Program	Date	Ref.
The Show (SBS MTV)	July 6, 2021	

== Charts ==
Chart performance for "PTT (Paint the Town)"
Chart (2021)	Peak position
South Korea (Gaon)	134
US World Digital Song Sales (Billboard)	6

== Release history ==
Region	Date	Version	Format	Distributor
Various	June 28, 2021	Original	Digital download; streaming	Blockberry Creative
Japan	June 28, 2021	Japanese	Digital download; streaming	Universal Music Japan

== See also ==
- List of The Show Chart winners (2021)
