= List of Show Champion Chart winners (2022) =

Winners of South Korean music program Show Champion

Show Champion Chart winners (2022)

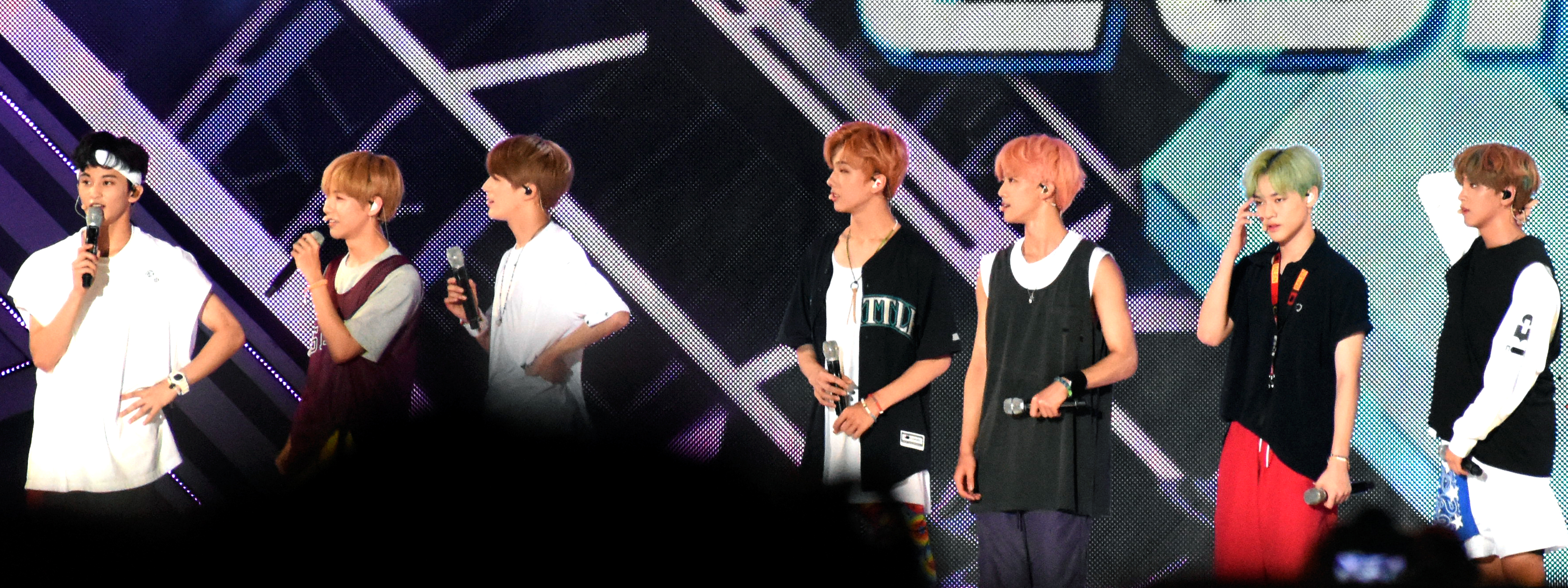
NCT Dream's (pictured) win for "Beatbox" had the highest score of 2022, with 9,810 points at the June 8th broadcast.

The Show Champion Chart is a record chart on the South Korean MBC M television music program Show Champion. Every week, the show awards the best-performing single on the chart in the country during its live broadcast.

In 2022, 33 singles achieved number one on the chart, and 26 acts were awarded first-place trophies. "Beatbox" by NCT Dream had the highest score of the year, with 9,810 points on the June 8 broadcast. "Shut Down" by Blackpink is the only song to achieve a triple crown.

== Chart history ==
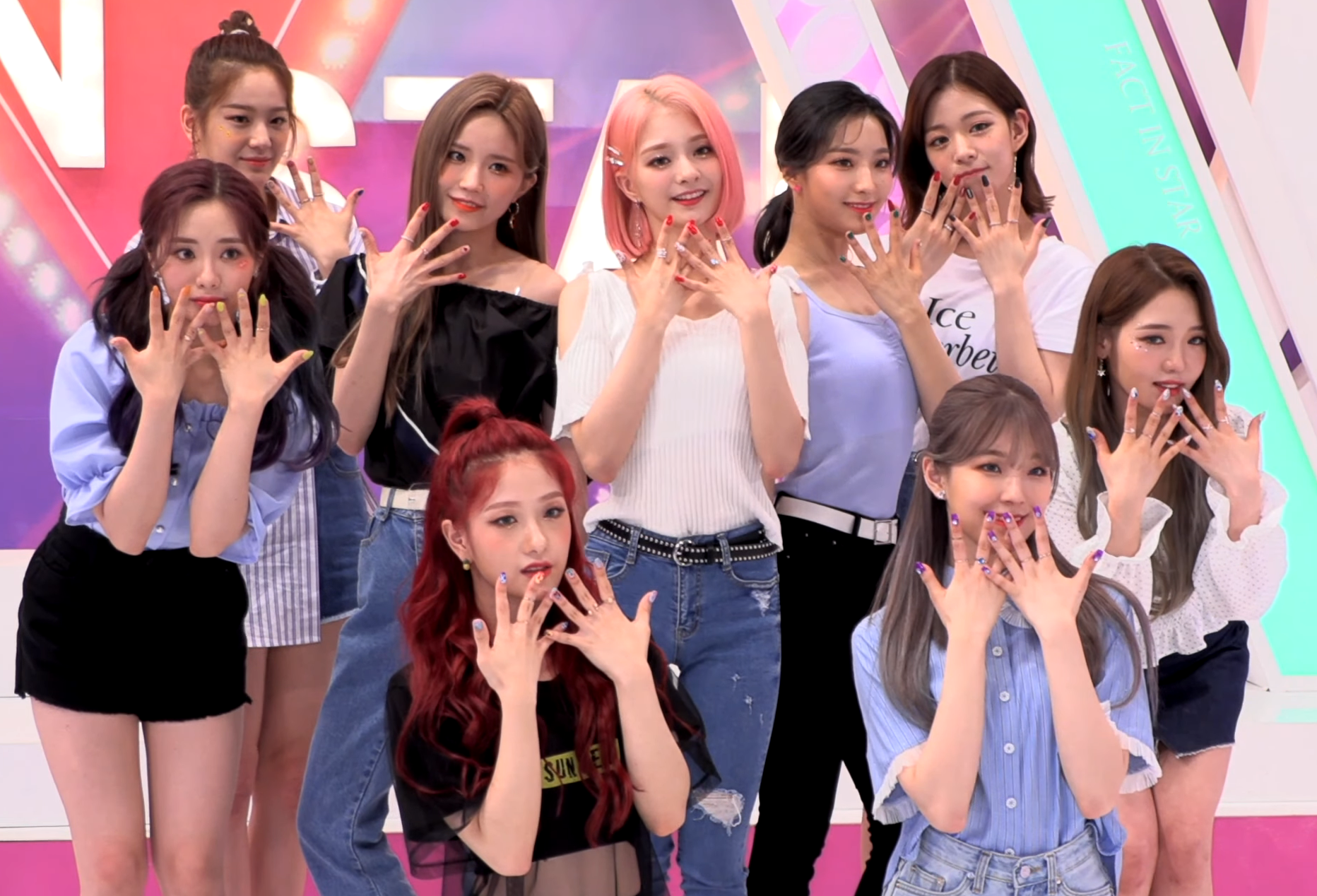
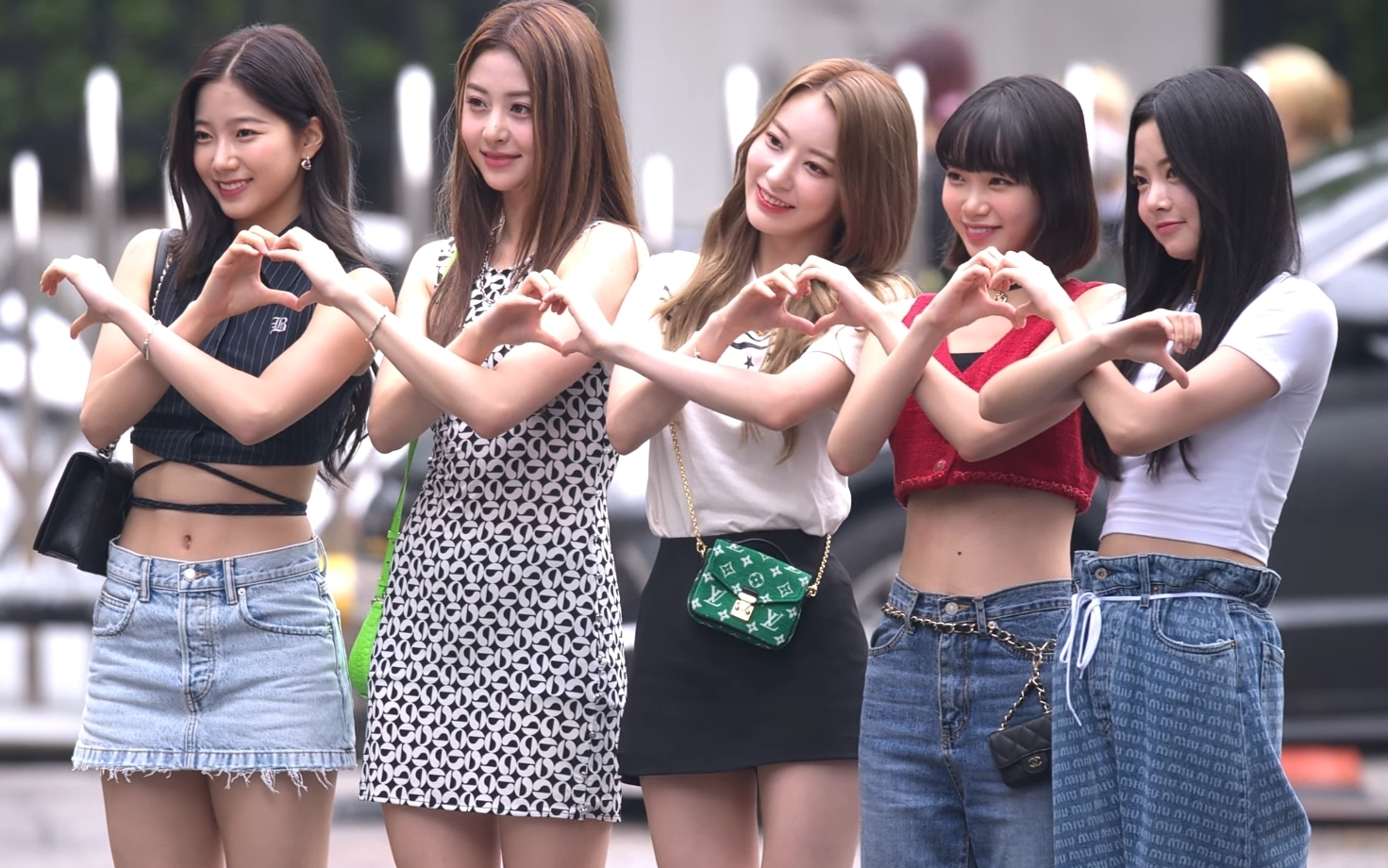
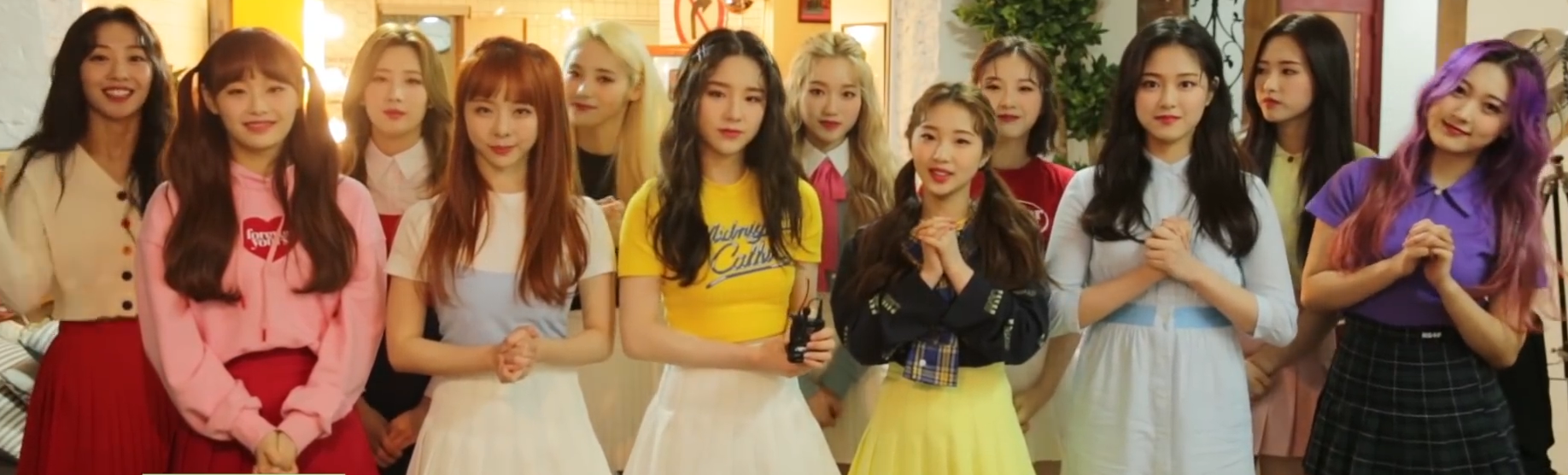
Fromis 9 (top), Le Sserafim (middle), and Loona (bottom) won Show Champion for the first time with their awards for "DM," "Fearless," and "Flip That," respectively.
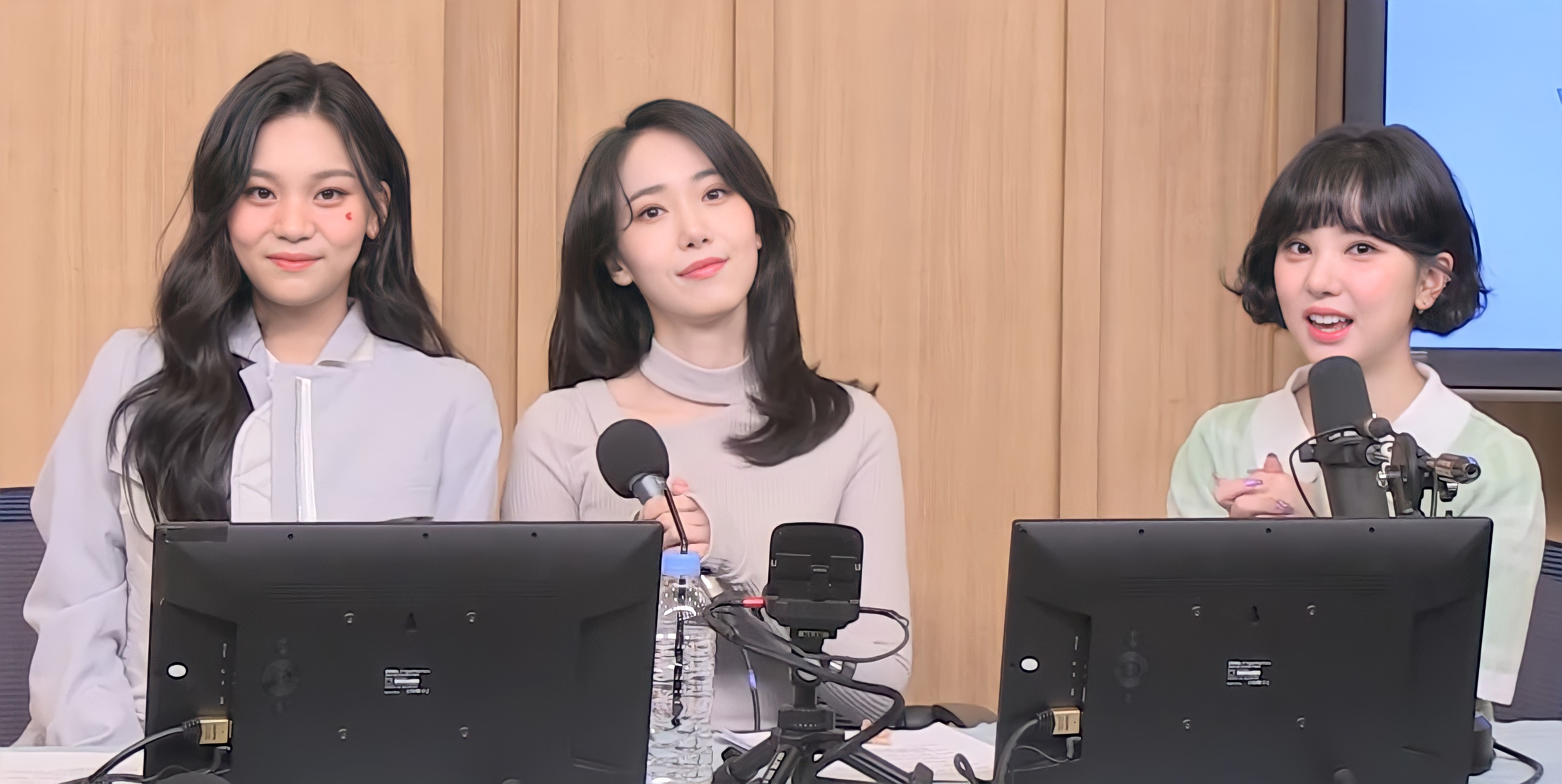
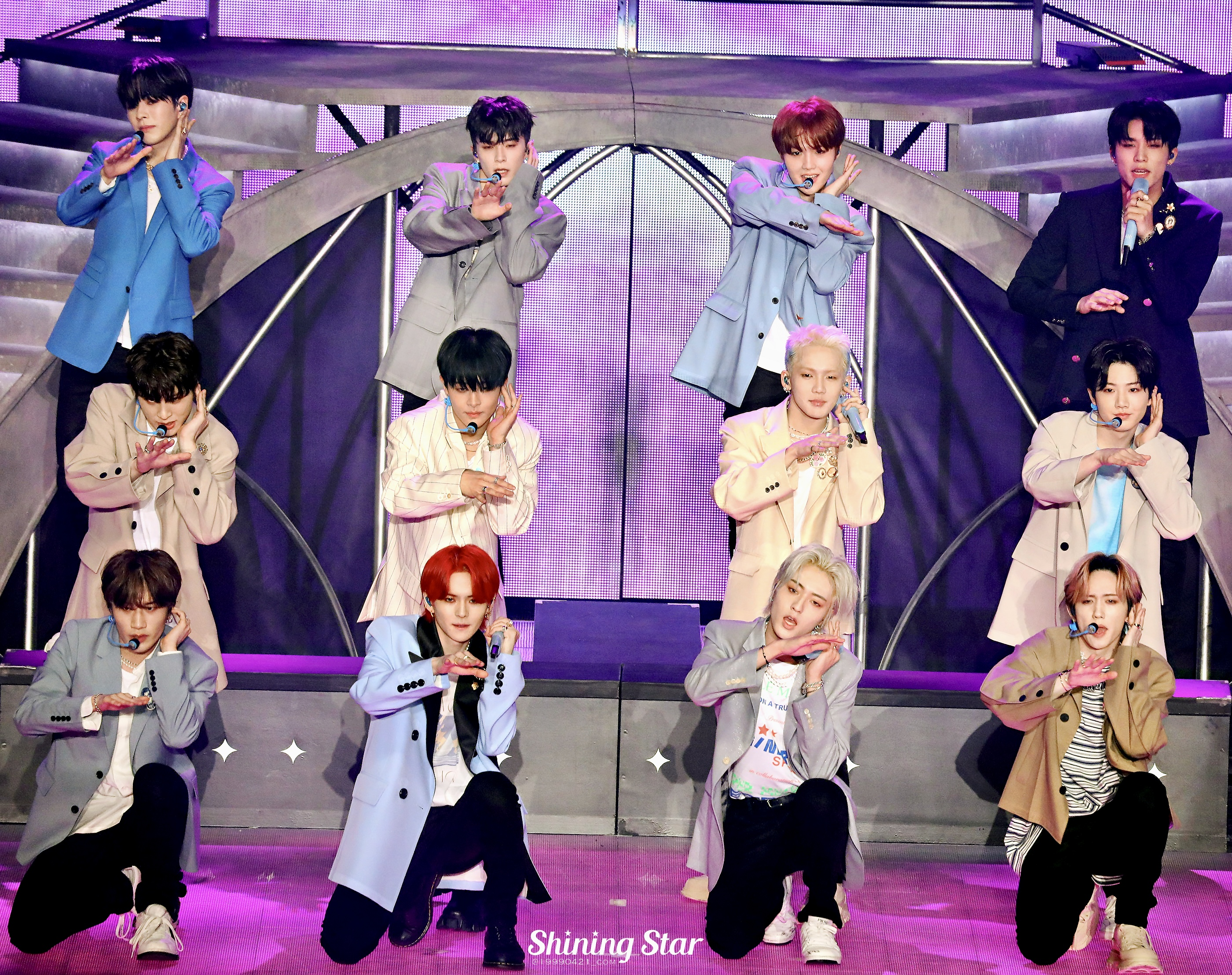
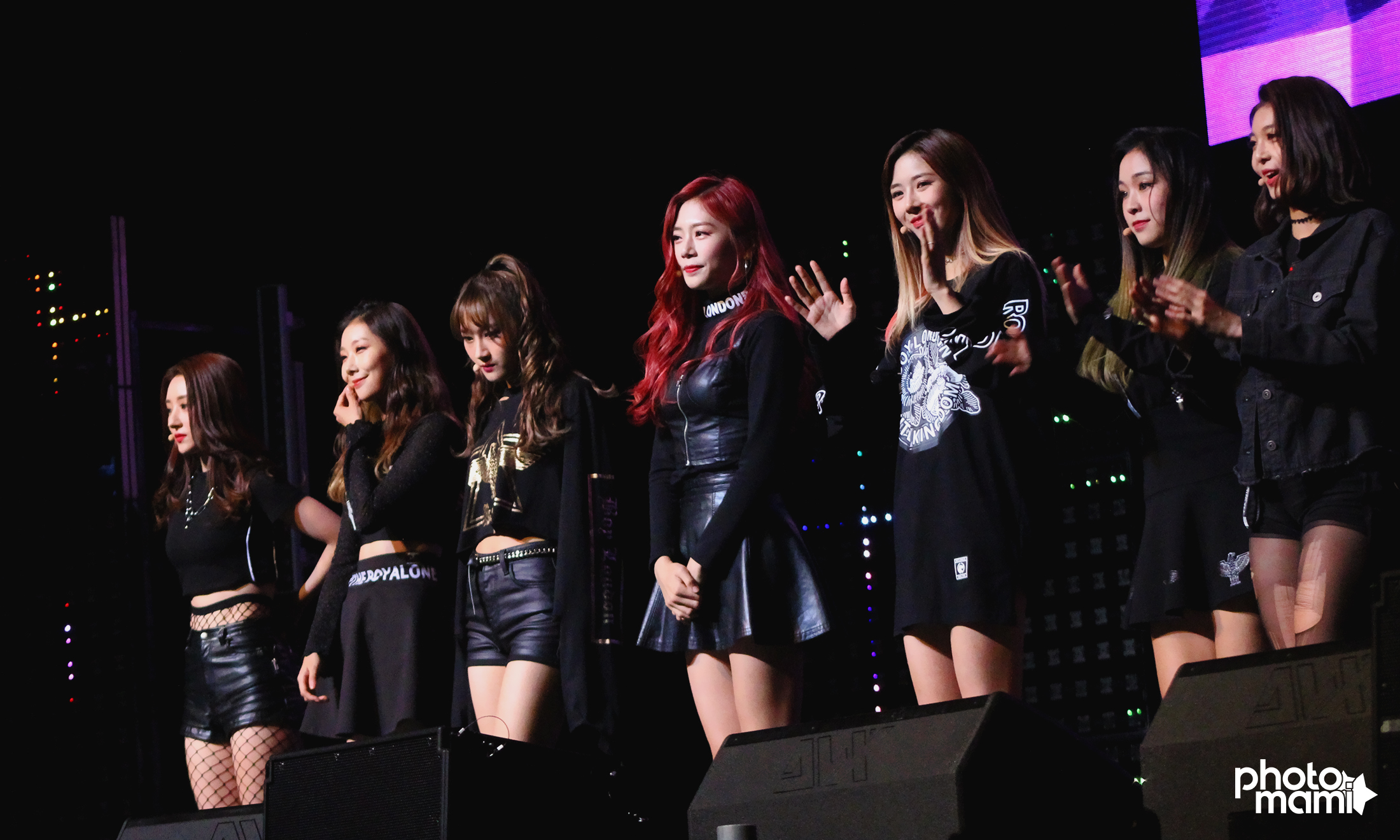
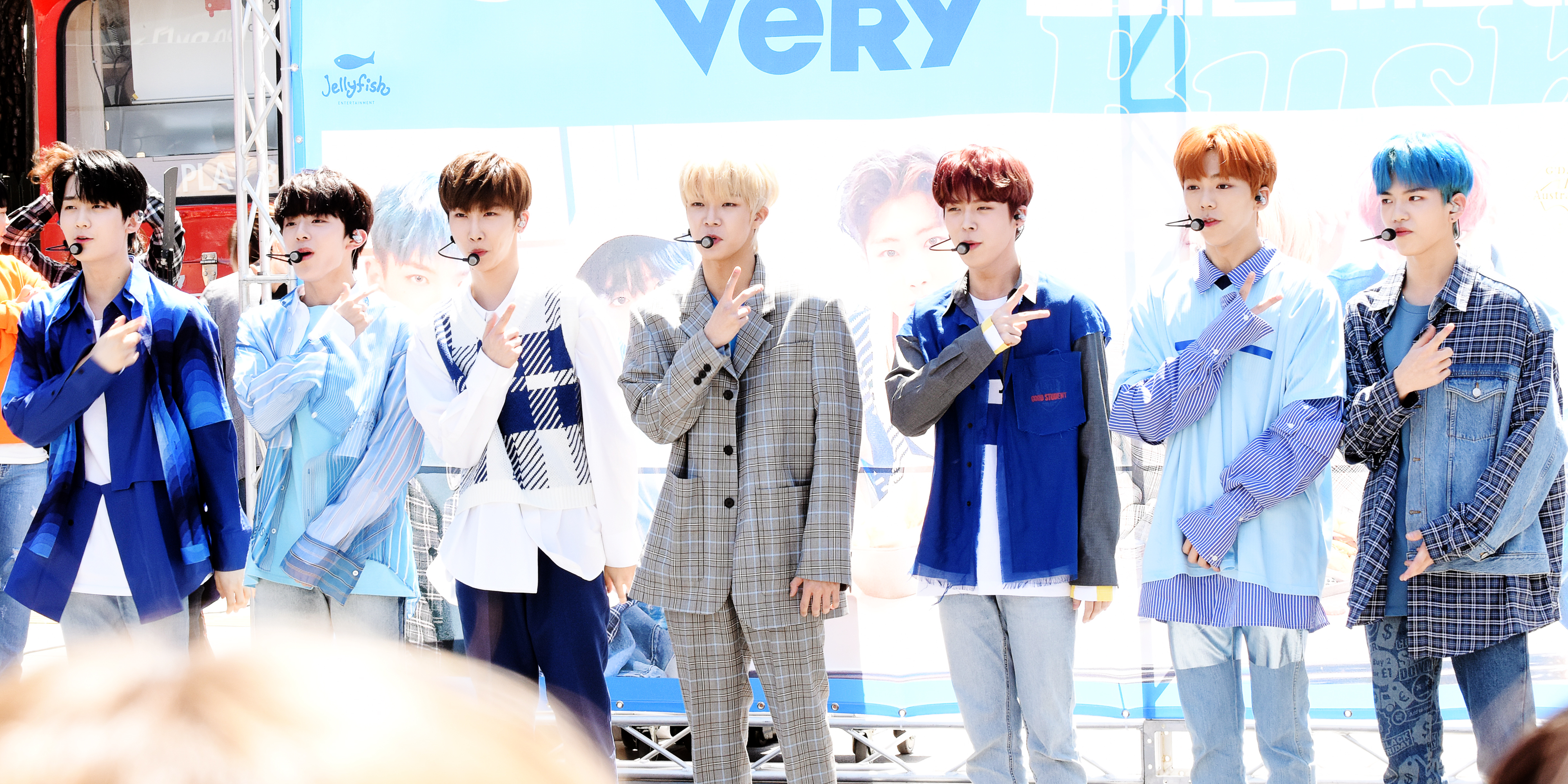
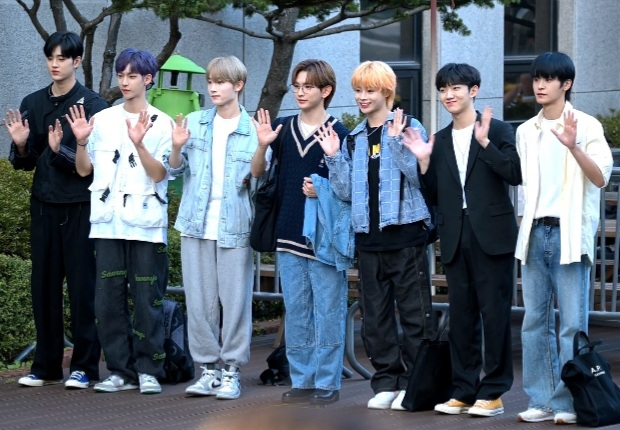
Viviz (top), Treasure (second from top), Dreamcatcher (third from top), Verivery (second from bottom), and Tempest (bottom) won their first ever music show trophies with their Show Champion awards for "Bop Bop!," "Jikjin," "Maison," "Tap Tap," and "Dragon," respectively.

Key
	Indicates a Triple Crown
	Highest score of the year
—	No show was held

Episode	Date	Artist	Song	Points	Ref.
—	January 5	No Broadcast or Winner			
—	January 12	No Broadcast or Winner			
421	January 19	Enhypen	"Blessed-Cursed"	7,178	
422	January 26	Fromis 9	"DM"	7,642	
—	February 2	No Broadcast or Winner			
—	February 9	No Broadcast or Winner			
423	February 16	Viviz	"Bop Bop!"	7,541	
424	February 23	Treasure	"Jikjin"	5,486	
425	March 2	BtoB	"The Song"	5,334	
426	March 9	STAYC	"Run2U"	5,022	
—	March 16	No Broadcast or Winner			
427	March 23	(G)I-dle	"Tomboy"	6,843	
428	March 30	Stray Kids	"Maniac"	6,020	
429	April 6	NCT Dream	"Glitch Mode"	5,598	
430	April 13	Ive	"Love Dive"	6,437	
431	April 20	Dreamcatcher	"Maison"	6,545	
—	April 27	No Broadcast or Winner			
432	May 4	Monsta X	"Love"	4,383	
433	May 11	Psy feat. Suga	"That That"	4,514	
434	May 18	Psy feat. Suga	"That That"	4,506	
435	May 25	Astro	"Candy Sugar Pop"	7,237	
436	June 1	Le Sserafim	"Fearless"	5,127	
437	June 8	NCT Dream	"Beatbox"	9,810	
438	June 15	BTS	"Yet to Come"	8,000	
—	June 22	No Broadcast or Winner			
439	June 29	Loona	"Flip That"	5,439	
440	July 6	Fromis 9	"Stay This Way"	8,690	
441	July 13	Enhypen	"Future Perfect"	6,263	
442	July 20	Aespa	"Girls"	6,777	
443	July 27	Seventeen	"_World"	6,442	
444	August 3	Ateez	"Guerrilla"	6,189	
445	August 10	Ateez	"Guerrilla"	5,894	
—	August 17	No Broadcast or Winner			
446	August 24	Blackpink	"Pink Venom"	4,435	
447	August 31	Ive	"After Like"	8,632	
448	September 7	Ive	"After Like"	5,458	
449	September 14	Oneus	"Same Scent"	7,450	
450	September 21	Blackpink	"Shut Down"	5,227	
451	September 28	Blackpink	"Shut Down"	7,022	
452	October 5	Blackpink	"Shut Down"	6,764	
453	October 12	Stray Kids	"Case 143"	6,733	
454	October 19	Stray Kids	"Case 143"	6,308	
455	October 26	(G)I-dle	"Nxde"	8,771	
—	November 2	No Broadcast or Winner			
456	November 9	(G)I-dle	"Nxde"	5,435	
457	November 16	Highlight	"Alone"	5,958	
458	November 23	Verivery	"Tap Tap"	4,858	
459	November 30	Tempest	"Dragon"	7,549	
460	December 7	Red Velvet	"Birthday"	6,022	
461	December 14	Red Velvet	"Birthday"	3,936	
—	December 21	No Broadcast or Winner			
—	December 28	No Broadcast or Winner			
