= (12:00) =

[12:00]
- Digital and Version B cover

EP by Loona
- Released: October 19, 2020
- Genre: Dance-pop; electropop; synth-pop; EDM
- Length: 24:07
- Language: Korean; English
- Label: Blockberry Creative
- Producer: Lee Soo-man; Coach & Sendo; Will Simms; Trackside; Jinbyjin; Peter Wallevik; ROSSI; Bangers & Cash

Loona chronology
[#] (2020)	[12:00] (2020)	[&] (2021)

Singles from [12:00]
- 1. "Why Not?" Released: October 19, 2020; 2. "Star" Released: December 21, 2020

[12:00] (read as "midnight") is the third extended play by South Korean girl group Loona. It was released on October 19, 2020, by Blockberry Creative and distributed by Kakao M. Like their previous album [#], the EP was produced by SM Entertainment founder and producer Lee Soo-man, and the group's leader HaSeul once again did not take part in this album release to focus on her health.

== Background ==
On September 16 Blockberry Creative announced Loona's new mini-album titled [12:00] scheduled to be released in October. A teaser was released on the same day which opens with a shot of a clock reading 11:59 p.m. in Seoul. The teaser then shows the time in other cities, including Tokyo and London, before the clock in Korea turns to midnight. Blockberry also confirmed that member Haseul will continue her hiatus and will not be involved in the comeback, out of her own decision to focus on the recovery of her health.

On September 24 the official track list was released and "Why Not?" was announced as the lead single with a music video.

== Singles ==
"Why Not?" was released as the lead single and title alongside the EP on October 19, 2020.

On November 15, a music video teaser for "Star" was uploaded to the group's YouTube channel. The video was released on November 18, 2020, and the song was serviced to American contemporary radio formats on December 21, 2020, as the second single from the album.

== Critical reception ==
Professional ratings
Review scores
Source	Rating
AllMusic	4/5 stars

Neil Z. Yeung from AllMusic gave the EP 4 out of 5 stars calling it another set of expertly crafted and energetic dance-pop songs. He said "From the bubble-bounce electroclash of "Why Not?" and "Hide & Seek" to the sleek "Voice" (which receives an English translation on "Star"), [12:00] wastes little time getting the body moving. Harder-edged rap anthem "OOPS!" and the yearning vocal showcase "Fall Again" offer some variety, making this effort one of the more enjoyable experiences in their catalog."

== Commercial performance ==
In the US, the album entered various charts. It debuted and peaked at number 112 on the US Billboard 200, becoming the fourth highest-peaking album by a Korean female artist on the chart and making Loona the sixth South Korean female artist to break into the chart, after BoA, Girls' Generation, 2NE1, Blackpink and Twice. They were also the first artist from a small to mid-sized South Korean agency make an appearance on the chart. It also entered at number 7 on the US World Albums Chart, earning the group their sixth top ten entry. In its second week, the album peaked at number 4, becoming their highest-peaking album on the chart. It also entered at number 3 on the US Heetseekers Albums, becoming their highest-charting album on the chart and becoming their best-selling project in the country. It peaked atop the chart the following week, becoming their first effort to top the chart.

In South Korea, [12:00] debuted and peaked at number 4 for the week ending October 24, 2020. In its second week, the EP dropped to number 10 and to number 38 in its third week. The album also entered at number 9 on the Gaon Album Chart for the month of October 2020 with less than half a month of tracking and selling 85,624 copies.

In the UK, the album debuted at number 15 on the Official Album Downloads Chart for the week ending October 23, 2020 becoming the group's first ever top twenty entry on the chart.

== Accolades ==
[12:00] on 2020 year-end lists
Critic/Publication	List	Rank	Ref.
NPR	LaTesha Harris' Favorite Albums of 2020	6	

== Track listing ==
[12:00] track listing
No.	Title	Lyrics	Music	Arrangement	Length
1.	"12:00"		Coach & Sendo	Coach & Sendo	1:13
2.	"Why Not?"	Hwang Yoo-bin	Will Simms; Sondre Nystrom; Julia Finnseter; Ellen Berg	Will Simms; Coach & Sendo	3:25
3.	"Voice" (목소리; Moksori)	makeumine works; JQ	Jesse Saint John; Georgia Ku; Trackside	Trackside	3:18
4.	"Fall Again" (기억해; Gieokae)	Kim Yeon-seo	JINBYJIN; Kim Yeon-seo	JINBYJIN	3:35
5.	"Universe"	Jo Yoon-kyung	Daniel Durn; Katrine Neya Klith Joergensen; Peter Wallevik	Peter Wallevik	3:34
6.	"Hide & Seek" (숨바꼭질; Sumbakkokjil)	Moon Hye-min	Paulos Solbo; Fredrik Raadal-Simonsen; Matilda Frommegård	ROSII	3:02
7.	"Oops!"	Kim Yeon-seo	Phat Fabe; Harry Sommerdahl; Kim Yeon-seo; Matilda Frommegård	Bangers & Cash	2:42
8.	"Star (Voice English Version)"	Jesse Saint John; Georgia Ku; Trackside	Jesse Saint John; Georgia Ku; Trackside	Trackside	3:18
Total length:					24:07

=== Note ===
"Oops!" is stylized in all caps.

== Charts ==
=== Weekly charts ===
Weekly chart performance for [12:00]
Chart (2020)	Peak position
South Korean Albums (Gaon)	4
UK Digital Albums (OCC)	15
US Billboard 200	112
US Heatseekers Albums (Billboard)	1
US Independent Albums (Billboard)	23
US World Albums (Billboard)	4

=== Year-end charts ===
Year-end chart performance for [12:00]
Chart (2020)	Position
South Korean Albums (Gaon)	71

== Certification and sales ==
Region	Certification	Certified units/sales
South Korea	—	116,614
United States	—	14,400

== Release history ==
Region	Date	Format	Label
South Korea	October 19, 2020	Digital download; streaming; CD	Blockberry Creative; Kakao M
Various	October 19, 2020	Digital download; streaming	Blockberry Creative
