= Star (Loona song) =

2020 single by Loona

Single by Loona

from the EP [12:00]
- Language: English
- Released: December 21, 2020
- Recorded: 2020
- Genre: Synth-pop
- Length: 3:18
- Label: Blockberry Creative
- Songwriters: Jesse Saint John; Georgia Ku; Trackside
- Producers: Jesse Saint John; Georgia Ku; Trackside

Loona singles chronology
"Why Not?" (2020)	"Star" (2020)	"PTT (Paint the Town)" (2021)

Music video
- "Star" on YouTube

"Star" (Note: Also titled "Star (Voice English Version)".) is a song released by the South Korean girl group Loona. It was sent to US radios on December 21, 2020, as the second single from their third mini-album [12:00]. The song was released as a response to the support the group received globally. It is the first English single released by the whole group (sub-unit Loona Odd Eye Circle previously released an English version of their song, "Loonatic") and is the English version of the song "Voice", from the same album.

== Release ==
Loona unveiled the official music video on November 18 to mark the start of promotions for the song which according to Forbes seemed to indicate larger intentions in the US market. According to Forbes the synth-pop production on the song was similar to those utilized by chart-toppers like The Weeknd and Dua Lipa, and the song also sonically aligns itself well alongside some of groups's most beloved tracks like their 2019 single "Butterfly". On December 21 of the same year the song was also sent to contemporary hit radios across the US.

== Composition and lyrics ==
"Star" is a synth-pop song composed in F♯ minor and has a tempo of 158 beats per minute. The song is charged with "cosmic energy" until the very last chorus explodes with perfectly blended vocal colors and dazzling choreographic synchronization. The lyrics captures the precarious and once-in-a-lifetime nature of the group's global fame and their understanding of how much they owe their unprecedented nugu stardom to the rapidly growing community of their fans that gravitates toward them. The song has also been described as retro, having a low addictive repeated beat that captures the uncontainable excitement of being in love.

== Commercial performance ==
In January 2021 the song entered media base top 50 US radio chart becoming the group's first song to do so. In February the song officially entered the Mainstream Top 40 chart becoming their first song to enter the chart. With 671 spins, "Star" landed at number 39 on the list, which is tracked by Mediabase. This made Loona the first solo Korean girl group and only the second overall Korean girl group in history to reach the milestone alongside Blackpink who entered the chart in 2020 with their Selena Gomez collaboration "Ice Cream". The song peaked at number 31 becoming one of the highest peaking K-pop songs on the chart and spent nine weeks on the chart becoming the longest running song on the chart by a Korean female artist.

The song was one of the only two songs by any Korean female artists to enter the Billboard Pop Airplay chart in 2021, the other being Lisa's "Money" which peaked at number 35.

== Music video ==
The video for the song was directed by MOSWANTD and directed by Bravo Peak. Inspired by the midnight festival, Sleeping Beauty and the cosmos, the ethereal music video follows the members of the group as they wake up within a dream and chase their goals and aspirations after discovering themselves in a mysterious space. The group members put on a dreamlike performance in a private midnight festival, paying homage to the light of stars which give them strength and confidence. The stars that appear throughout the music video represent the group's fans called "Orbits". It implies that as the members of the group chase their dreams, they are illuminated by their fans all over the world.

== Accolades ==
=== Year end lists ===
Critic/Publication	List	Rank	Ref.
Paper	The 40 Best K-pop Songs of 2020	33	
BuzzFeed	35 Best K-pop Songs of 2020	33	
CNN Philippines	Best K-pop Songs of 2020	N/A (Note: All songs listed are unranked.)	
Nación Rex	20 K-pop Songs That Dominated 2020	11	
South China Morning Post	The best 15 singles from K-pop groups in 2020	N/A (Note: All the songs are alphabetically listed with no ranking.)	
K-pop Starz	Best B-Sides of 2020	1	

== Charts ==
Chart performance for "Star"
Chart (2021)	Peak position
US Mainstream Top 40 (Billboard)	31

== Release history ==
Region	Date	Format	Label
Various	October 19, 2020	Digital download; streaming	Blockberry Creative
United States	December 21, 2020	Contemporary hit radio	Blockberry Creative
