= Why Not? (song) =

2020 single by Loona

Single by Loona

from the EP [12:00]
- Language: Korean
- Released: October 19, 2020
- Recorded: 2020
- Genre: Future house; electropop; experimental pop; funk; EDM
- Length: 3:25
- Label: Blockberry Creative
- Songwriters: Hwang Yoo Bin, Julia Bognar Finnseter, Ellen Berg, Sondre Nystrom
- Producers: Will Simms; Coach & Sendo

Loona singles chronology
"So What" (2020)	"Why Not?" (2020)	"Star" (2020)

Music video
- "Why Not?" on YouTube

"Why Not?" is a song released by the South Korean girl group Loona. It was released on October 19, 2020, as the lead single from their third mini-album [12:00].

== Composition and lyrics ==
Billboard described the song as "shapeshifting". The song is an uptempo electropop, deep house and funk song with influences of future bass. In a press release members of the group said the lyrics of the song are about "pursuing freedom and individualistic self".

== Music video ==
The music video for the song was released on the same day as the song. The video amassed over 2.3 million views in its first 24 hours of release. As of July 2023, the music video has more than 48 million views between the upload on Loona's YouTube channel and the upload on 1TheK's YouTube channel.

=== Synopsis ===
The visuals of the music video were described as "celestial" and "mystical". The members are seen dancing in the middle of trashed grocery store, on the surface of the Moon, and skipping in circles around a fire as the Earth looms behind them. The girls later return to Earth to float through fields filled with levitating orbs, dance on ceilings rimmed in neon, and joyfully run through clouds of colorful chalk.

== Live performance ==
Loona performed the song for the first time on its release day at the Blue Square iMarket Hall in Hannam-dong, central Seoul, during the song's showcase.

== Charts ==
Chart performance for "Why Not?"
Chart (2020)	Peak position
South Korea (Gaon Download)	78

== Release history ==
Region	Date	Format	Label
Various	October 19, 2020	Digital download; streaming	Blockberry Creative
